= Parks and Greenways in Huntsville =

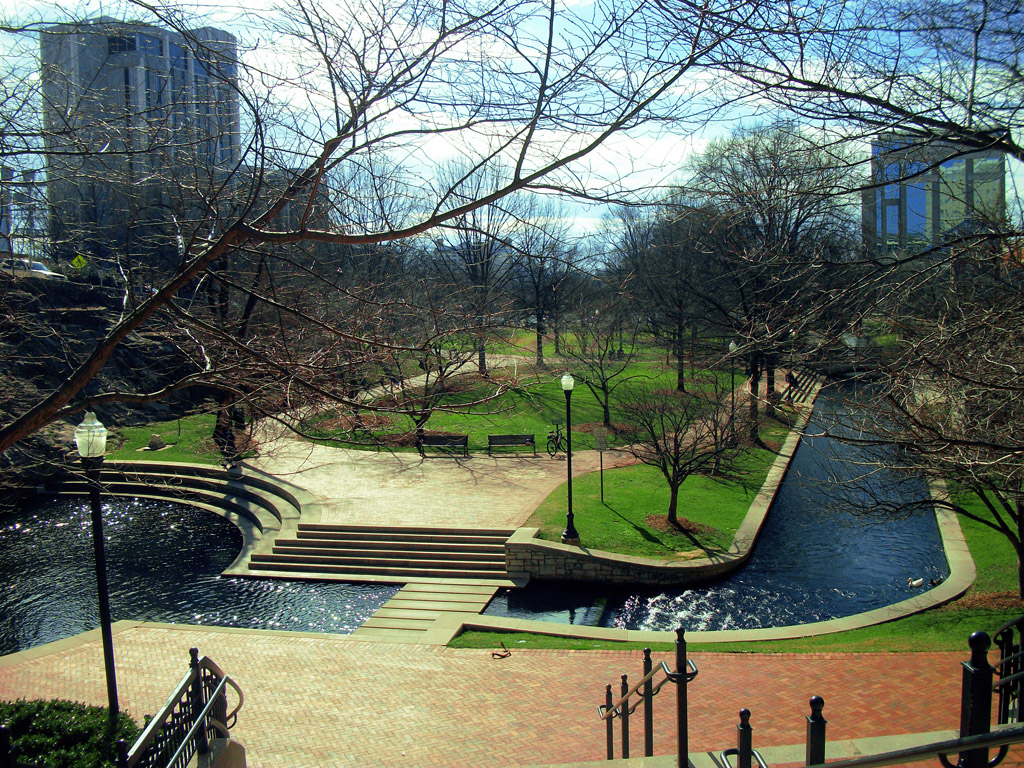
Big Spring Park in Downtown

An extensive collection of parks and greenways exists in Huntsville, Alabama for the public's recreational use.

== Parks ==
=== Parks within Huntsville city limits ===
The city of Huntsville currently has 57 parks which cover over 3,000 acres of land.

| Park Name | Location | Address | Acreage | Playground | Walking Trails | Number of Fields and Courts | | | | | | Notes |
| Park Name | Location | Address | Acreage | Playground | Walking Trails | Soccer | Football | Baseball | Softball | Basketball | Tennis | Notes |
|---|---|---|---|---|---|---|---|---|---|---|---|---|
| Archer Park | Southwest | 3315 Archer Dr | 3.62 | Yes | No | 1 | | | 2 | | | |
| Beirne Ave Park | Northeast | 330 Beirne Av | 1.68 | Yes | No | | | | | 1 | 2 | Located across the Street from Goldsmith Schiffman Field |
| Bell Mountain Park | Southwest | 2560 Redstone Rd | 30.05 | Yes | No | 1 | 1 | 2 | 2 | | | |
| Bicentennial Park | Downtown | 315 Fountain Cir | 0.30 | No | No | | | | | | | Passive Greenspace |
| Big Spring Park | Downtown | 200 Church St | 17.96 | No | Yes | | | | | | | Passive Greenspace |
| Brahan Spring | Southwest | 500 Drake Av | 169.92 | Yes | No | 3 | 1 | 5 | 5 | | | 6 outdoor volleyball fields and 2 playgrounds |
| Buchanan Park | Southwest | 10044 Fielding Dr | 3.97 | Yes | No | 1 | | | | 1 | 2 | |
| California Street Park | Southeast | 708 California St | 2.00 | Yes | No | | | | | 1 | 2 | |
| Cavalry Hills Park | Northwest | 2800 Poplar Av | 6.91 | Yes | No | 2 | 1 | 2 | | | | |
| Chelsea Park | Southwest | 2851 Chelsea Ln | 3.50 | Yes | No | | | | 1 | 1 | | |
| Cove Park | Southeast | 834 Old Highway 431 | 98.04 | Yes | No | 1 | | 2 | 2 | | | |
| Creekwood Park | Northwest | 360A Harvestwood Ct | 71.88 | Yes | Yes | | | | | | | Disc Golf Course, Passive Greenspace, Dog Park, connects to Indian Creek Greenway |
| Downtown Dog Spot | Downtown | 200 Cleveland Av | 1.50 | Yes | No | | | | | | | Passive Greenspace, Dog Park |
| Dr. Richard Showers, Sr. Park | Northwest | 4600 Blue Spring Rd | 17.70 | Yes | Yes | | | 1 | 1 | | | Outdoor Exercise facility |
| Fern Bell / Fern Gulley Park | Southwest | 6900 Whitesburg Dr | 14.20 | Yes | No | 3 | | 4 | 3 | | | 2 multipurpose fields |
| Goldsmith-Schiffman Wildlife Sanctuary | Southeast | Taylor & Terry Drake | 375.7 | No | Yes | | | | | | | Passive Greenspace |
| Halsey Park | Southeast | 435 White St | 0.2 | No | No | | | | | | | Passive Greenspace |
| Hastings Park | Southwest | 2801 Hastings Rd | 0.34 | Yes | No | | | | | | | |
| Hays Nature Preserve | Southeast | 7153 Hwy 431 S | 552.35 | No | Yes | | | | | | | Passive Greenspace, connects to Big Cove Creek Greenway and Flint River Greenway |
| Hermitage Park | Southeast | 915 Kennamer Dr | 4.11 | Yes | No | | | | | | 1 | |
| Hillendale Park | Northwest | 2811 Holmes Av | 0.39 | Yes | No | | | | | | | |
| Holmes Avenue Park | Northwest | Holmes Av | 2.9 | Yes | No | | | | 1 | 1 | | |
| James C. Crawford Park | Northeast | 3915 Melody Rd | 8.33 | Yes | No | | | | 1 | 1 | | formerly Edmonton Heights Park |
| John Hunt Park | Southwest | 2151 Airport Rd | 428.01 | Yes | Yes | 21 | | 2 | 2 | | | Outdoor Exercise facility and a multipurpose field |
| Jones Family Park | Southeast | | 33 | No | Yes | | | | | | | Passive Greenway, will be part of the future Aldridge Creek greenway expansion |
| Ken Johnston Park | Southeast | 1100 Mt. Gap Rd | 18.36 | Yes | No | | | | | | | Outdoor Exercise facility, Trail head for Aldridge Creek greenway |
| Kent Roberson Park | Southwest | 7620 Logan Dr | 13.68 | Yes | No | 2 | | | 2 | | 2 | Also known as "Logan Park" |
| Kids' Space | Southwest | 2010 Airport Rd | 0 | Yes | No | | | | | | | Located within John Hunt Park |
| Kiwanis Soccer Park | Southwest | 4201 Bob Wallace Av | 6.39 | No | No | 1 | | | | | | |
| Knox Creek Park | Northwest | 180 Greenbank Dr | 26.76 | Yes | No | | | | | 1 | | |
| Lakewood Park | Northwest | 2225 York Rd | 32.45 | Yes | No | | | 2 | 3 | | | 1 multipurpose field |
| Lewter Park | Northeast | 1501 Wellman Av | 0.52 | Yes | No | | | | | | | formerly Wellman Park |
| Maple Hill Park | Southeast | 1351 Mcclung Av | 8.64 | Yes | No | | | | | | | Also known as "Dead Children's Playground," 1 multipurpose field |
| Maplewood Park | Northwest | 4943 N Mem Pkwy | 9.5 | Yes | No | | | | 1 | | | |
| Mastin Lake Park | Northwest | 3315 Watson Dr | 31.73 | Yes | No | 1 | | 2 | | | 2 | |
| Mayfield Park | Southwest | 550 Thornton Av | 8.88 | Yes | No | | | 2 | 2 | | | |
| McGucken Park | Southeast | 13020 Bailey Cove Rd | 37.1 | Yes | Yes | 2 | 1 | 2 | 3 | | 2 | accesses Aldridge Creek Greenway |
| Meadow Hill Park | Northwest | Medaris Rd | 1.06 | Yes | No | 1 | | | 1 | | | |
| Merrimack Park | Southwest | 3501 Triana Blvd | 46.8 | Yes | No | 10 | | | | | | Also known as "Huntsville Park" |
| Metro Kiwanis Sportsplex | Southwest | 3590 Patton Rd | 64.92 | Yes | No | | | | 6 | | | |
| Oak Park | Northeast | 2250 Oakwood Av | 9.2 | Yes | No | | | 2 | 2 | | | |
| Oakmont Park | Northwest | 2224 Euclid Rd | 3.72 | Yes | No | | | | | | | |
| Ogden Park | Southwest | 5251 Triana Blvd | | No | No | | | | 1 | | | 1 multipurpose field |
| Optimist Park | Northeast | 703 Oakwood Av | 8.5 | Yes | No | | | 1 | | | | Playground good size for toddlers, small equipment |
| Philpot Park | Northeast | 1211 Philpot Av | 4 | Yes | No | | | | | | 2 | Also known as "Chapman Park" |
| Pine Park | Southwest | 3951 Pine Av | 2.34 | Yes | No | | | | | | | |
| Robert E. Lee Cramer Jr. Park | Southeast | 600 Meridian St | 2.8 | Yes | No | | | | | | | A part of "Gateway Greenway" |
| Sandhurst Park | Southwest | 2928 Green Cove Rd | 17.1 | Yes | No | 1 | | 2 | | | | |
| Scenic Overlook | Southeast | 2251 Governors Dr | 4.5 | No | No | | | | | | | Passive Greenspace |
| Scenic View Park | Northwest | 2705 Scenic View Dr | 5.1 | Yes | No | | | | 1 | | | |
| Sherwood Park | Northwest | 325 Town and Country Dr | 5 | Yes | Yes | 1 | | | 1 | | | Also known as "Forest Park" |
| Skatepark | Downtown | 200 Cleveland Av | 0.66 | No | No | | | | | | | |
| Stoner Park | Northwest | 3715 Bragg St | 67.62 | Yes | No | 1 | 1 | 6 | 4 | | 2 | |
| University Park | Northwest | 4419 Saundralane Dr | 10.74 | Yes | No | | | 1 | 4 | | | A part of UAH |
| Veteran's Park | Downtown | 200 Monroe St | 2.64 | No | No | | | | | | | formerly Gateway Park, accesses Gateway Greenway, Passive Greenspace |
| Willow Park | Southeast | 1928 Aftonbrae Dr | 9.34 | Yes | Yes | | | | 2 | | 2 | 1 multipurpose field |
| Windsor Manor Park | Northwest | 6500 Pisgah Dr | 7.99 | | No | | | | 1 | 1 | 2 | |

=== Proposed parks ===
- Capshaw Road Park
- Zierdt Road Park

== Current greenways ==
As of 2017, there are 9 greenways with 73 miles (117 km) of trail.

=== Aldridge Creek Greenway ===
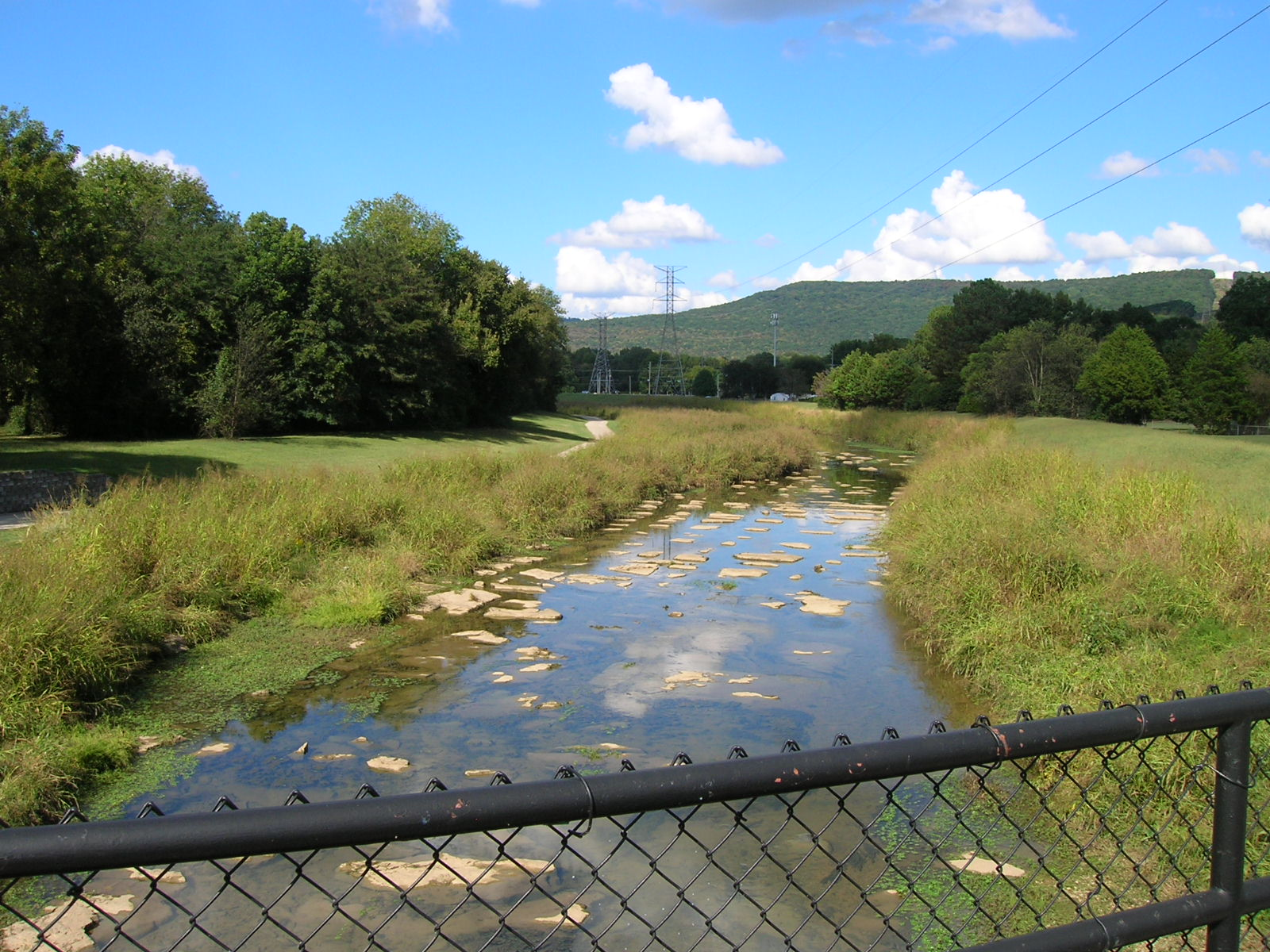
Aldridge Creek Greenway

Aldridge Creek Greenway is a 103.55-acre greenway consisting of a 4.25-mile-long (6.84 km) walking and biking trail in South Huntsville that runs along Aldridge Creek connecting Ken Johnston Park to Ditto Landing and the Tennessee River. The greenway runs north along Aldridge Creek from the main trailhead for 1.25 miles to the sidewalk on the west side of Bailey Cove Road just north of Country Lane Drive and south to the entrance of Ditto Landing, about 3.5 miles. The address of the park is 1100 Mountain Gap Road at Ken Johnston Park just west of Bailey Cove Road. Parking is also available on the south end of the greenway at Ditto Landing and additional parking is located behind Challenger School on Chaney Thompson Road.

The city had planned to continue the greenway north to connect to Atwood Linear Park Greenway. However, Valley Hill Country Club will not allow the city to expand the greenway through their golf course. The city has plans to construct future segments of the greenway from the current north terminus to the east end of Esslinger Road.

=== Atwood Linear Park Greenway ===
Atwood Linear Park Greenway is a 0.9-mile-long (1.4 km) trail that connects Jones Family Park to the Valley Hill Country Club. The trail is a multi-use walking and biking trail that runs along Atwood Drive in the Jones Valley area of Southeast Huntsville. Parking is available at Jones Family Park on the north side of Four Mile Post Road.

=== Big Cove Creek Greenway ===
Big Cove Creek Greenway is a 53-acre greenway in southeast Huntsville's Hampton Cove subdivision that runs along Big Cove Creek north to just south of Caldwell Lane. There is a multipurpose walking and biking trail that is 2.86 miles (4.60 km) long that connects the Flint River greenway to the Hampton Cove community. The city of Huntsville plans to extend the greenway north to Monte Sano Mountain and connect it to the existing Arrowhead trail.

=== Flint River Greenway ===
The Flint River Greenway is one of the newest greenways in the city of Huntsville. It is located in southeast Huntsville in the Hampton Cove subdivision. Currently, there is a 1.87-mile-long (3.01 km) walking and biking trail connecting Old US 431 to the Big Cove Creek Greenway in the Hays Nature Preserve where parking is available. The city of Huntsville plans to extend the greenway south along the Flint River to eventually connect to the Tennessee River greenway.

When completed, the greenway will be 36.0 miles (57.9 km) long and contain canoe launch sites spaced throughout the length of the greenway.

=== Gateway Greenway ===
Gateway Greenway is a 0.6 miles (0.97 km) long trail that connects Veterans Park to Pratt Avenue in downtown Huntsville. Parking is available along Meridian Street.

=== Indian Creek Greenway ===
Indian Creek Greenway
- Type: Public Greenway
- Location: Huntsville, Alabama
- Area: 61.68 acres (0.10 sq mi)

Indian Creek Greenway is a series of greenways that make up 3.77 miles (6.07 km) of walking and biking trails in West Huntsville. The north section of the greenway is located in the Providence subdivision off of University Drive. The larger, south section of the greenway, which is 2.95 miles (4.75 km) long, runs from Creekwood Park to Old Madison Pike just west of Cummings Research Park. Parking is available at the trail heads at Creekwood Park and off Old Madison Pike east of Slaughter Road.

=== Little Cove Road Greenway ===
Little Cove Road Greenway is made up of a 5.04 miles (8.11 km) long trail that connects Big Cove Creek Greenway north to the Flint River in Southeast Huntsville. The greenway travels along Little Cove Road/Eastern Bypass/Old Hwy 431.

=== Tennessee River Greenway ===
The Tennessee River Greenway connects to the Aldridge Creek Greenway at Ditto Landing in South Huntsville and adds an additional 0.93 miles (1.50 km) of walking and biking trail that runs along the Tennessee River. This greenway connects Ditto Landing to the Madison County Marina. Parking is available at Ditto Landing. The City of Huntsville plans to extend the greenway south along the river and will end at the Flint River, where it will eventually connect to the Flint River greenway.

=== Wade Mountain Greenway ===
In North Huntsville lies nearly 5.5 miles (8.9 km) of greenway known as Wade Mountain Greenway with 1 mile (1.6 km) of a paved trail and 4.375 miles (7.041 km) is an unpaved hiking trail.

== Proposed greenways ==
- Barren Fork / Miller Branch - Southwest Huntsville near Huntsville International Airport that will connect Martin Road with Wheeler National Wildlife Refuge
- Betts Spring Branch Greenway - Southwest Huntsville. Along with a proposed Madison City greenway of the same name, will connect to Indian Creek Greenway and Cummings Research Park.
- Big Spring - Downtown Huntsville. This greenway will connect Big Spring Park to the Monte Sano Nature Preserve.
- Blevins Gap - Hampton Cove/Jones Valley. This greenway will connect Big Cove Greenway to Blevins Gap Nature Preserve and Baliey Cove Road running along Cecil Asburn Drive.
- Blue Spring Creek - Northwest Huntsville.
- Broglan North - Northwest Huntsville.
- Broglan South - West of Downtown Huntsville. This greenway will connect Holmes Avenue to Governors Drive.
- Chapman Mountain - Northeast Huntsville. This greenway will connect Monte Sano State Park with Alabama A&M.
- Dallas Branch - North of Downtown Huntsville.
- Dry Creek Northwest Huntsville. This greenway will connect Providence and Indian Creek Greenway with Wade Mountain.
- Huntsville Spring Branch - West Huntsville. This greenway will run north/south connecting Downtown with Ditto Landing.
- Knox Creek - West Huntsville near Athens. This greenway will run south of Capshaw Road connecting Limestone Creek with Wall Triana Highway.
- Limestone Creek - Limestone County. This greenway will run 14 miles, connecting East Limestone to Wheeler National Wildlife Refuge.
- McDonald Creek - Southwest Huntsville. This greenway will connect U.S. Space and Rocket Center with John Hunt Park.
- Pinhook II - North of Downtown. This greenway will run north from Big Spring Park to Sparkman Drive.
- Smithers Mountain - Northeast Huntsville.
- Spacewalk I - East Huntsville. This greenway will connect the Burritt Museum and Monte Sano State Park with Blevins Gap.
- Spacewalk II - East Huntsville. This greenway will connect Blevins Gap (Blevins Gap Nature Preserve) with Madison County Nature Trail.
- Spacewalk III - East Huntsville. This greenway will connect Madison County Nature Trail with Ditto Landing.
- Wallace Mountain - Southeast Huntsville. This greenway will connect Spacewalk III with the Flint River.
- Warparth Ridge - East Huntsville. This greenway will connect Monte Sano Nature Preserve with the Flint River.
- Weatherly Mountain Greenway - South Huntsville.
- Zierdt Road - West Huntsville.

== Trails ==
- Blevins Gap Nature Preserve offers 10.5 miles of hiking trails on 971.12 acres
- Chapman Mountain Nature Preserve offers 3 miles of hiking trails with plans for 10 miles of trails
- Madison County Nature Trail, located on Green Mountain, has 1.5 miles (2.4 km) of walking trail around a large lake
- Monte Sano State Park offers over 14 miles (23 km) of hiking trails
- Monte Sano Nature Preserve, the green backdrop for the city of Huntsville, offers 1,107 acres and 23+ miles of public trails.
- Singing River Trail of North Alabama is a future 70-mile bicycling and walking trail that will connect Huntsville to multiple nearby cities.

== Preserves ==
=== Goldsmith Schiffman Wildlife Sanctuary ===
The Goldsmith Schiffman Wildlife Sanctuary is located in southeast Huntsville, near Hampton Cove, to the west of the Hays Nature Preserve.

=== Hays Nature Preserve ===
The Hays Nature Preserve, located in southeast Huntsville near the subdivision of Hampton Cove, is the city's largest and most undeveloped parklands. The Flint River and Big Cove Creek greenways run through the nature preserve and connect with various hiking trails along the way.

=== Monte Sano Nature Preserve ===
Located on Monte Sano Mountain, Monte Sano Nature Preserve covers 1,107 acres (448 ha) making it one of the largest urban nature preserves in the US, larger than Central Park. It includes over 25 miles (40 km) of trails for hiking and mountain biking, which connect to Monte Sano State Park and Burritt on the Mountain. This Preserve is managed in partnership with the Land Trust of North Alabama.

=== Wade Mountain Nature Preserve ===
Wade Mountain Nature Preserve is a series of greenways and trails that make up 5.375 miles (8.650 km) of walking and hiking trails in North Huntsville. The trails are made up of 1-mile-long (1.6 km) paved trail and 4.375 miles (7.041 km) of unpaved hiking trails that lead up Wade Mountain to the Devil's Race Track. This Preserve is managed in partnership with the Land Trust of North Alabama.
