= Monte Sano =

Monte Sano may refer to:

- Monte Sano Mountain, Monte Sano State Park, and Monte Sano Nature Preserve, all in Huntsville, Alabama, USA
- Monte Sano (6500 BCE), Early Archaic period mound complex in Baton Rouge, Louisiana
- Monte-Sano & Pruzan, an American fashion house founded by Vincent Monte-Sano senior, originally called Monte-Sano.
