= List of tornadoes in Huntsville, Alabama =

Huntsville, Alabama, has had several tornadoes strike within the city, or in its suburbs throughout its history.

Confirmed tornadoes by Enhanced Fujita rating
EFU	EF0	EF1	EF2	EF3	EF4	EF5	Total
1	4	4	9	2	2	1	23

Note: tornadoes were rated using the old Fujita scale prior to February 1, 2007, but are included in the chart above by matching the F rating to the related EF scale rating.

- The first documented tornado to strike Huntsville occurred in April 1822.
- An F2 tornado struck on the evening of April Fools' Day 1884. The tornado was on the ground for 82 miles, traveled through five counties, and caused 2 known deaths.
- 3 tornadoes struck the city in 1967:
  - An F2 tornado struck in the early afternoon of November 24, 1967. The tornado struck the eastern edge of the city and the neighboring Big Cove community.
  - An F2 tornado struck during the early morning hours of December 18, 1967 leaving at least 4 dead and 29 injured. The tornado was on the ground for 20 miles and at the widest point was 300 feet.
  - An F1 tornado struck in the early evening hours of December 21, 1967.
- An F3 tornado during the Super Outbreak in April 1974 caused damage in Huntsville and crossed Monte Sano.
- Dual tornadoes struck within an hour of one another on the western edge of the city in present-day Cummings Research Park during Hurricane Danny in the early afternoon of August 16, 1985. The first tornado was an F1 that lasted for 8.5 miles, and the second was an F2 that lasted for 13 miles.
- An F4 tornado struck the southern portion of the city on November 15, 1989, resulting in 21 deaths.
- The Anderson Hills tornado, also an F4, struck the northern suburbs on May 18, 1995.
- An EF2 tornado struck downtown, including the Five Points area, on January 21, 2010.
- The 2011 Super Outbreak produced the 2011 Hackleburg–Phil Campbell tornado, which affected the northern suburbs of Huntsville.
- Two tornadoes struck northern suburbs of the city on March 2, 2012.
- A tornado formed over the eastern section of the city on November 29, 2016, leaving damage on Monte Sano Mountain.
- Two tornadoes struck nearby suburbs of the city on New Year's Day 2022.
- An EF1 tornado formed northwest of Maple Hill Cemetery, causing minor damage to trees, as it tracked through eastern Huntsville on May 8, 2024. Part of the Tornado outbreak of May 6–10, 2024. An EF0 briefly entered Huntsville but dissipated shortly after passing Slaughter Road and an EF2 formed over Monte Sano in the Five Points neighborhood.
- An EF2 struck the Greenbrier area of Huntsville and caused EF2 damage in Madison on May 20, 2025, part of the May 18–21, 2025 tornado outbreak. It had recorded wind speeds of over 200 mph at the intersection of Mooresville Road and Greenbrier Parkway. In the same outbreak, an EF1 occurred in the Monte Sano and Blossomwood areas in Huntsville. An EF0 in an isolated even occurred one week later on the Redstone Arsenal.
