= Hampton Cove, Huntsville =

Hampton Cove
- Neighborhood of Huntsville, Alabama
- Interactive map of Hampton Cove
- Coordinates: 34°40′20″N 86°27′28″W
- Country: United States
- State: Alabama
- County: Madison
- Time zone: UTC-6 (Central (CST))
  - Summer (DST): UTC-5 (CDT)
- ZIP code: 35763
- Area code: 256
- GNIS feature ID: 2108414

Hampton Cove is a master-planned housing subdivision located in Big Cove area of Huntsville, Alabama. Situated in the foothills and valleys of North Alabama's Cumberland Plateau, the 2,800-acre (11 km^{2}) Housing lies in the coves between Monte Sano Mountain and Green Mountain to the west, and Keel Mountain to the east.

Hampton Cove has 2,000 homes in twenty one different areas ranging from patio homes and townhomes to family homes and multimillion-dollar estates. The community has 28 stocked lakes, 3 golf courses, and 20 miles (32 km) of sidewalks and paths. Hampton Cove is adjacent to the 538 acres (2.18 km^{2}) Hays Nature Preserve and the Big Cove Creek Greenway. Hampton Cove is unincorporated and shares land with Huntsville, Gurley, Owens Cross Roads, and Big Cove. They currently do not have a high school or their own zip code.

The average household income in 2018 is stated to be 145,000.

== History ==
Development of Hampton Cove began in 1992, in a partnership between brothers John and Jimmy Hays and nephew Jeff Enfinger. The partners purchased the acreage just over Monte Sano Mountain from several different landowners including Burritt and Whitaker to develop a golf course and subdivision in what was then open countryside between the city of Huntsville and the rural communities of Big Cove, Gurley and Owens Cross Roads. Additional land was purchased from Robert L. Sublett, a local farmer in the Little Cove area. The addition of three Robert Trent Jones Golf Trail courses encouraged further development in the area. Much of the golf course is on the former Burritt property.

Formerly a rural community, the area was once known as Horse Cove, because local residents hid their horses there to prevent them being seized by the Union Army during the Civil War. The land was originally occupied by the Cherokee and Chickasaw tribes before becoming part of the Mississippi Territory in 1806. According to A History of Madison County and Incidentally of North Alabama, 1732–1840 by Judge Thomas Jones Taylor, "The lands of old Madison being the first offered for sale were eagerly sought for and rapidly taken up and occupied by a class of settlers who were in intellect, enterprise and energy, the prize of any continent." Settlers were drawn to the area for its fertile soil and the natural beauty of the mountains and adjacent Flint River.

All services are provided by Huntsville. The community shares a zip code (35763) with Owens Cross Roads, a nearby town. Big Cove, an unincorporated community, is near Hampton Cove.

== Neighborhoods and schools ==
Hampton Cove consists of 20 neighborhoods:

- Arbor Woods
- Cobblestone Cove
- Cumberland Cove
- Deford Mill
- Deford Mill Estates
- Eastern Shore
- Flint Mill
- Glen Eagles
- Grande Highlands
- Grande Highlands Estates
- Hampton Cove Estates
- Lake Pointe
- Mallard's Landing
- Providence Island
- Stoneleigh Terrace
- Sussex Quarter
- Tammerack Lakes
- Tammerack Links
- Treyburne
- Twelve Stones

Hampton Cove contains two elementary schools and one middle school. Hampton Cove Elementary was first built in the 1990s in order to accommodate the growing population of the area. Because of the rapid growth of the region, a second elementary school, Goldsmith-Schiffman Elementary School was opened in 2011. Both schools advance to Hampton Cove Middle School, which shares its campus with Hampton Cove Elementary School. Hampton Cove students advance to Huntsville High School which sits 12 miles (19 km) away. All four schools fall within the Huntsville City Schools system.

== Recreation and media ==
Hampton Cove hosts one of ten stops on the Robert Trent Jones Golf Trail. Hampton Cove's 630-acre (2.5 km^{2}), three-course, 54-hole facility is open year-round and includes a club house with a pro shop, meeting rooms, bar, and restaurant.

Hampton Cove is also home to 28 stocked lakes for fishing, miles of walking and biking trails and horse riding paths, and a 100-acre (0.40 km^{2}) city park with baseball, softball, and soccer fields. The area including Flint River, Hays Nature Preserve, and Goldsmith Schiffman Wildlife Sanctuary offer additional recreational opportunities.

In addition to the Huntsville radio, television, and print media outlets, Hampton Cove maintains its own magazine, LIFE in Hampton Cove, and a website which features local events.

The Hampton House is located in the Hampton Cove Community, with amenities that include six clay tennis courts with lights for night play, and an Olympic size pool.

== Notable people ==
- Michael Luwoye – actor and singer, known for playing the title role in the musical Hamilton, in its national touring company (2017) and on Broadway (2018)
- Jonathan "Rudy" Ford – cornerback for the Arizona Cardinals (2017–present), starting defensive back for the Auburn Tigers (2013–2017)
