= Monte Sano Nature Preserve =

Nature preserve in Alabama, United States

- IUCN category V (protected landscape/seascape)
- Location within Alabama
- Location: Huntsville, Alabama., U.S.
- Coordinates: 34°44′17″N 86°32′35″W
- Area: 1,107 acres (448 ha)
- Established: 1987
- Administrator: Land Trust of North Alabama

Monte Sano Nature Preserve is, at 1,107 acres (448 ha), one of the largest urban nature preserves in the US and is located on Monte Sano Mountain in Huntsville, Alabama. The Land Trust of North Alabama manages the nature preserve and Land Trust volunteers have created 23+ miles of public trails. Residents and visitors alike enjoy the multi-use trails for hiking, biking, running, bird watching, environmental education, and general recreation. The trail system was honored in 2011 by the Department of the Interior as National Recreation Trails making them the first NRT trails in Madison County.

"Huntsville/Madison County's mountains form the final segment of the Great Appalachian chain and provide some of the southernmost habitats of broadleaf hardwoods such as the Sugar Maple. Monte Sano is home to several plant species important to the study of ecosystem stability referred to by scientists as "relics", because they provide clues to the climate of periods hundreds of thousands of years ago. Some of these species include the American Smoketree (Chittamwood), Morefield's Leather Flower, Price's Potato Bean, and Cumberland Rosinweed."

Special features of the Monte Sano Nature Preserve include a former limestone quarry known as Three Caves, an historic spring named Trough Springs which was the site of one of the last Alabama confrontations of the Civil War, and the remnants of the Monte Sano Railroad from the late 1800s. The Old Railroad Bed Trail is one of the first 500 Rails-to-Trails Conservancy projects.

== Major Trailheads ==
=== Monte Sano Nature Preserve’s hiker parking lot on Bankhead Parkway ===
From University Drive and Memorial Parkway, follow Pratt Avenue East, through Five Points business district. Continue through Five Points on Pratt and continue straight as Pratt changes to Bankhead Parkway. Parking lot is 1/2 mile (0.8 km) past Toll Gate Road, on the right. The trailhead provides access to the Alms House, Bluff Line, Old Railroad Bed, and Toll Gate Trails.

=== South Monte Sano Blvd ===
From Memorial Parkway, take Governors Drive east up Monte Sano Mountain and turn left on Monte Sano Blvd. The trailhead is 3/4 mile (1.2 km) on the right. The trailhead provides access to Trough Springs, Bluffline and Natural Well (Monte Sano State Park) Trails.

=== 3 Caves ===
From downtown, follow signs along McClung Ave. from Williams Ave. across California Ave. into the Blossomwood neighborhood. At the end of McClung, you go south on Owens Drive, east on Hermitage Avenue and north on Kennamer Drive to reach the Three Caves. The trailhead provides access to 3 Caves Loop, Alms House, and Waterline Trails.

== See also ==
- Monte Sano State Park
- Burritt on the Mountain
