= Governors Drive =

Road in Huntsville, Alabama

Coordinates: 34.71994°N 86.58401°W

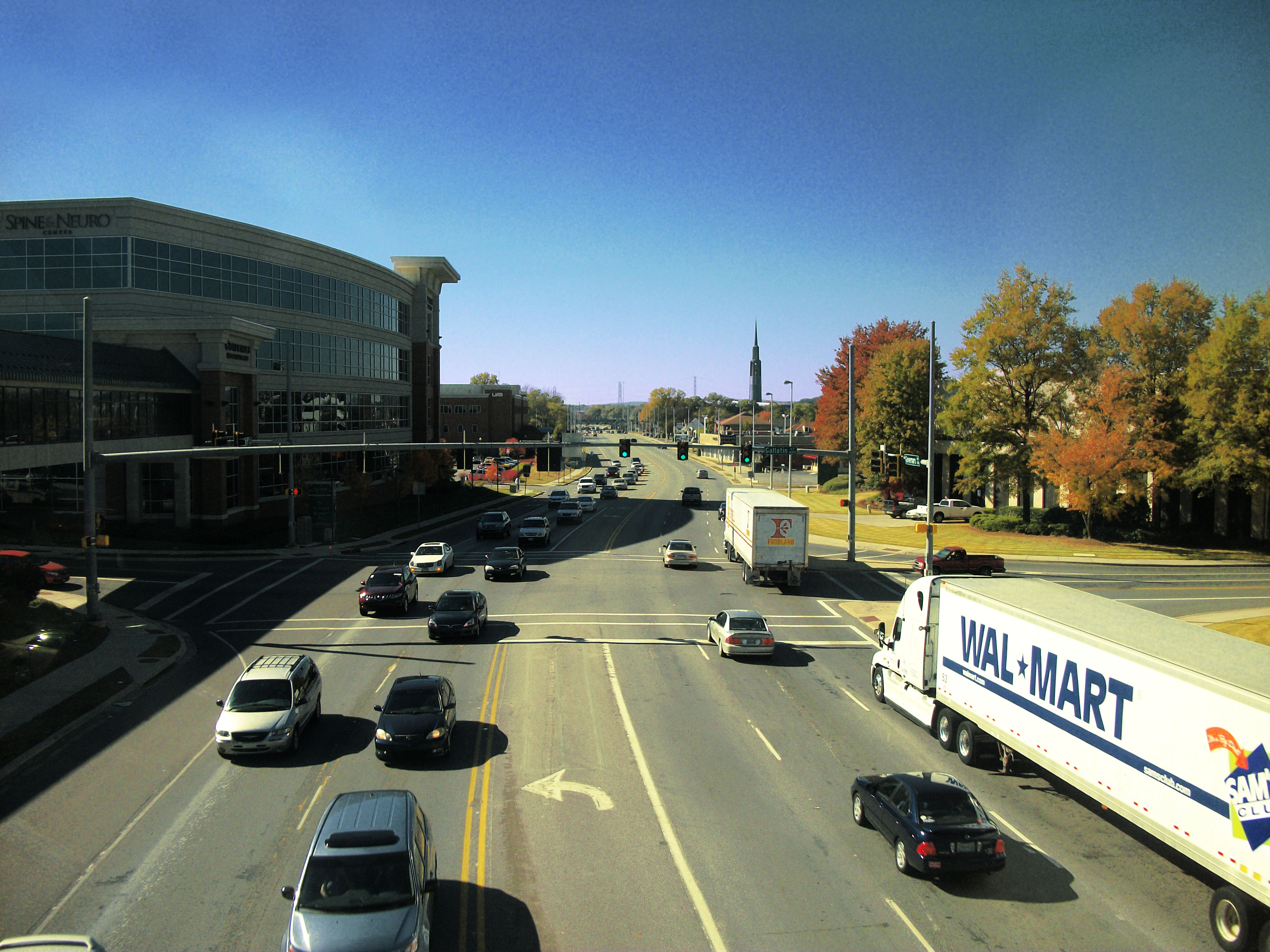
- Intersection at Gallatin Street
- Length: 7.0 mi (11.3 km)
- Location: Huntsville, Alabama
- East end: Dug Hill Road
- Major junctions: US 231 (Memorial Parkway)
- West end: I-565

Governors Drive is a major east–west thoroughfare in Huntsville, Alabama. It follows U.S. Route 431 (US-431) in east Huntsville and State Route 53 (SR-53) in west Huntsville. Governors Drive is one of the main entrance points to the city from the east, carrying on average approximately 48,000 vehicles a day across Monte Sano Mountain.

== Road description ==
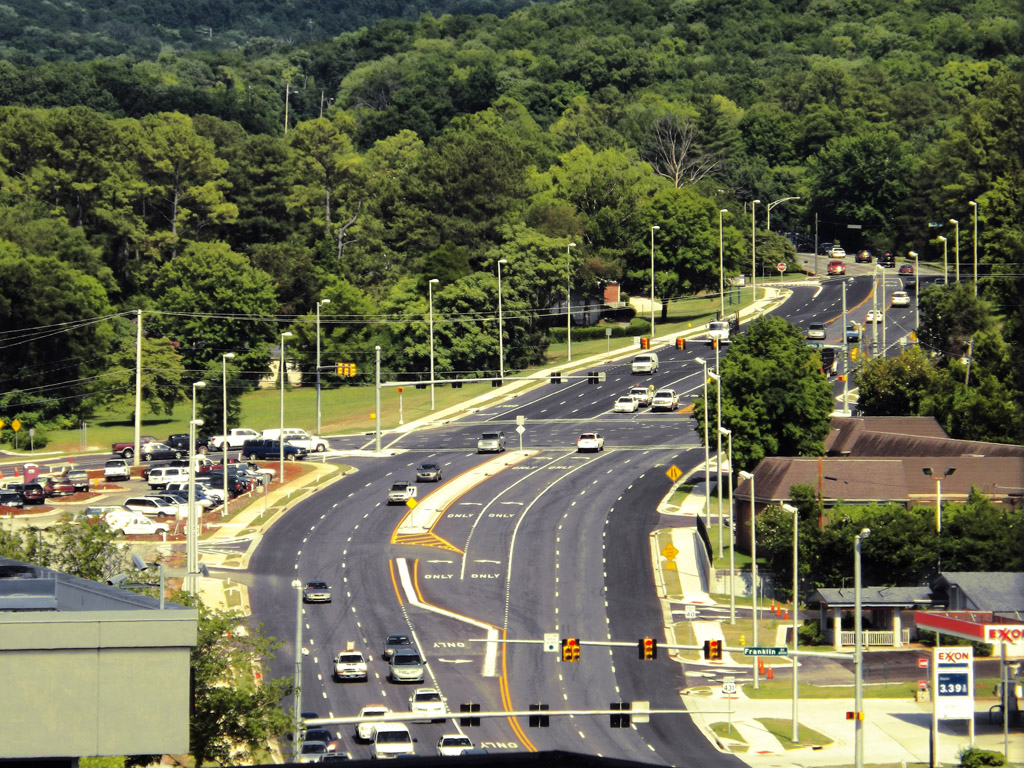
Governors Drive as it starts to head up Monte Sano Mountain

From the east, US-431 travels north up Monte Sano Mountain where it meets Dug Hill Road and becomes Governors Drive. From there, the four-lane highway turns to the west and meets Monte Sano Boulevard at the top of the mountain providing access to Monte Sano State Park. The highway then continues down the mountain, intersecting multiple surface streets along the way. Once down the mountain, the road widens to seven lanes where it intersects California Street and travels through the medical district intersecting with Franklin Street, Whitesburg Drive and Madison Street which provides direct access to Huntsville Hospital Emergency Room. The next intersection, Gallatin Street leads to the main entrance of Huntsville Hospital along with the new Twickenham Square development.

Continuing to the west, Governors Drive intersects Harvard Drive where the new Downtown Gateway is being constructed. This extension of Harvard Drive will provide a direct connection to Big Spring Park and Downtown Huntsville. The road then travels south of the oldest Baptist Church in Alabama, the First Baptist Church of Huntsville, past the well-known Eggbeater Jesus then crosses over a former Louisville and Nashville Railroad rail line and intersects Monroe Street, one of the main access points to Downtown, providing access to the Huntsville-Madison County Public Library. The road then meets Memorial Parkway at which point US-431 turns to the north; Governors Drive continues through the intersection to the west and joins SR-53. The highway narrows down to five lanes at Clinton Avenue, the main access point to Downtown for West Huntsville. Finally the highway continues to the west to meet with Interstate 565 (I-565) and Jordan Lane, where SR-53 continues to the north.

== Major intersections ==
The entire route is in Huntsville, Madison County.

mi	km	Destinations	Notes
0.0	0.0	US 431 south (Dug Hill Road)	Roadway continues south as US-431.
5.0	8.0	US 231 / US 431 north / SR 53 south (Memorial Parkway)	Western end of US-431 concurrency; eastern end of SR-53 concurrency
6.6	10.6	I-565 / SR 53 north (Jordan Lane)	Governors Drive ends as an exit ramp to either I-565 or Jordan Lane.
1.000 mi = 1.609 km; 1.000 km = 0.621 mi

== History ==
Prior to 1955, before Memorial Parkway was constructed, Governors Drive was two separate streets. West of Whitesburg Drive, Governors Drive was known as Fifth Avenue and east of Whitesburg Drive, it was named Florida Short Route. Fifth Avenue ended at Whitesburg Drive and Florida Short Route became Longwood Drive at Whitesburg Drive, one block south of Fifth Avenue. US-431 traveled along Florida Short Route and turned north at Whitesburg Drive, traveling through downtown.

When Memorial Parkway was built as a downtown bypass, US-431 needed to access the Parkway; so these two streets were connected and to allow US-431 to flow directly to Memorial Parkway. As a growing Huntsville consolidated, hundreds of streets were unified and renamed in 1956. The name Governors Drive was chosen for this road to honor the nine Alabama governors associated with Madison County history.

Prior to the construction of Interstate 565 in the early 1990s, Governors Drive extended further west, connecting to Slaughter Road just outside the city of Madison. The interstate removed over five miles of roadway, cutting Governors Drive nearly in half. Portions of the road still exist while other portions were relocated to make room for the interstate highway. From Slaughter Road to the east, Governors Drive took on the name Madison Boulevard. A two lane road connecting Madison Boulevard to Old Madison Pike was created as a service road and took on the name Governors West. The roadway from Research Park Boulevard east to Jordan Lane was removed completely as the interstate was placed.

== Transportation ==
Access to shuttle buses provided by the city of Huntsville are available along Governors Drive.

== See also ==
- University Drive, another major east–west highway in Huntsville
- Bob Wallace Avenue/Sparkman Drive, major highways that loop around Huntsville
