= California Street (Huntsville) =

Thoroughfare in Huntsville, Alabama, US

- Length: 1.8 mi (2.9 km)
- Location: Huntsville, Alabama
- South end: Whitesburg Drive
- Major junctions: Governors Drive
- North end: Clinton Avenue (continues as Andrew Jackson Way)

California Street is a major north-south thoroughfare in Huntsville, Alabama, connecting historic Five Points to south Huntsville. On average, approximately 18,500 vehicles travel the 1.8 mile stretch of road a day.

== Street description ==
From the south, California Street branches off of Whitesburg Drive, headed north, immediately intersecting Bob Wallace Avenue. The five lane highway travels through a densely populated residential neighborhood to meet Governors Drive (US-431) where it becomes the eastern boundary of the Huntsville Hospital medical district. California Street passes to the east of Huntsville High School and California Street Park. The road narrows to four lanes as it zig zags through another densely populated residential neighborhood after passing Maple Hill Cemetery. The street takes on the name 'Andrew Jackson Way' at the intersection of Clinton Avenue where it continues to Holmes Avenue in Five Points and later connects directly to Interstate 565 at Oakwood Avenue.

== History ==
California Street is one of the older streets in Huntsville, dating back to pre-Civil War times.

== Major intersections ==
Road	Notes
Whitesburg Drive	
Bob Wallace Avenue	
Governors Drive	
Lowe Avenue	
Clinton Avenue	

== Parks and recreation ==
- California Street Park - Tennis courts and playground located at the intersection of Lowe Aveuene
- Halsey Park - Open space located at the intersection of White Street
- William Kling, Sr. Park - Passive green space at the intersection of Governors Drive

== Points of interest ==
- Huntsville Hospital
- Huntsville Middle School
