= California Street =

California Street may refer to:

- California Street (Huntsville), a major thoroughfare in Huntsville, Alabama
- California Street (San Francisco), a major thoroughfare in San Francisco, California
