= Schoel Engineering Company =

Alabama Engineering Service

- Formerly: Schoel Engineering Co; Walter Schoel Engineering Co; H. Schoel, C.E.
- Industry: Civil Engineering
- Founded: 1888; 138 years ago in Birmingham, Alabama, United States
- Founder: Herman Schoel
- Number of employees: 100+ (2024)
- Website: schoel.com

Schoel Engineering Company located in Birmingham, Alabama, has offered consulting civil engineering, hydrologic and environmental consulting, and land surveying services, since its founding by Herman Schoel in 1888. The company is a member of the Alabama Engineering Hall of Fame.

== History ==
In 1888, Herman Schoel established the solo-engineer practice known as H. Schoel, C.E., laying the foundation for what would become Schoel Engineering Company. The firm has remained family-owned, now in its fifth generation, with Walter Schoel III as CEO and his sons, Taylor Schoel and Brooks Schoel, holding key leadership positions.

=== Acquisition of 4Site ===
In 2019, Schoel Engineering expanded its operations through the acquisition of 4Site, a civil engineering, land surveying, and landscape architecture firm based in Huntsville, Alabama.

The merger allowed Schoel to integrate 4Site’s expertise in landscape architecture and site design into its operations while maintaining the existing 4Site team in Huntsville.

4Site previously worked on projects such as the Pappy Dunn Boulevard Project in Anniston, Alabama in 2013 and the Welcome Center for the Huntsville Botanical Garden in 2016.

== Recognition ==
Schoel Engineering Company has been honored for its lasting contributions to engineering and the development of Alabama. In 2007, the company was inducted into the Alabama Engineering Hall of Fame, a recognition of its role in shaping Birmingham and the region.

In 2013, Dr. Walter Schoel III, who has played a key role in the company’s leadership, was named a Distinguished Engineering Fellow by University of Alabama's College of Engineering. This honor reflected not just his individual achievements but also the enduring legacy of the family-run company.

== Notable Projects ==
Schoel Engineering has been involved in numerous significant projects, such as:

- Protective Stadium
- Regions Field
- Benjamin Russell Hospital for Children
- Vulcan Park
- Honda Manufacturing Plant in Lincoln, Alabama
- Railroad Park
