= Orbit (bus system) =

Bus network serving Huntsville, Alabama, United States

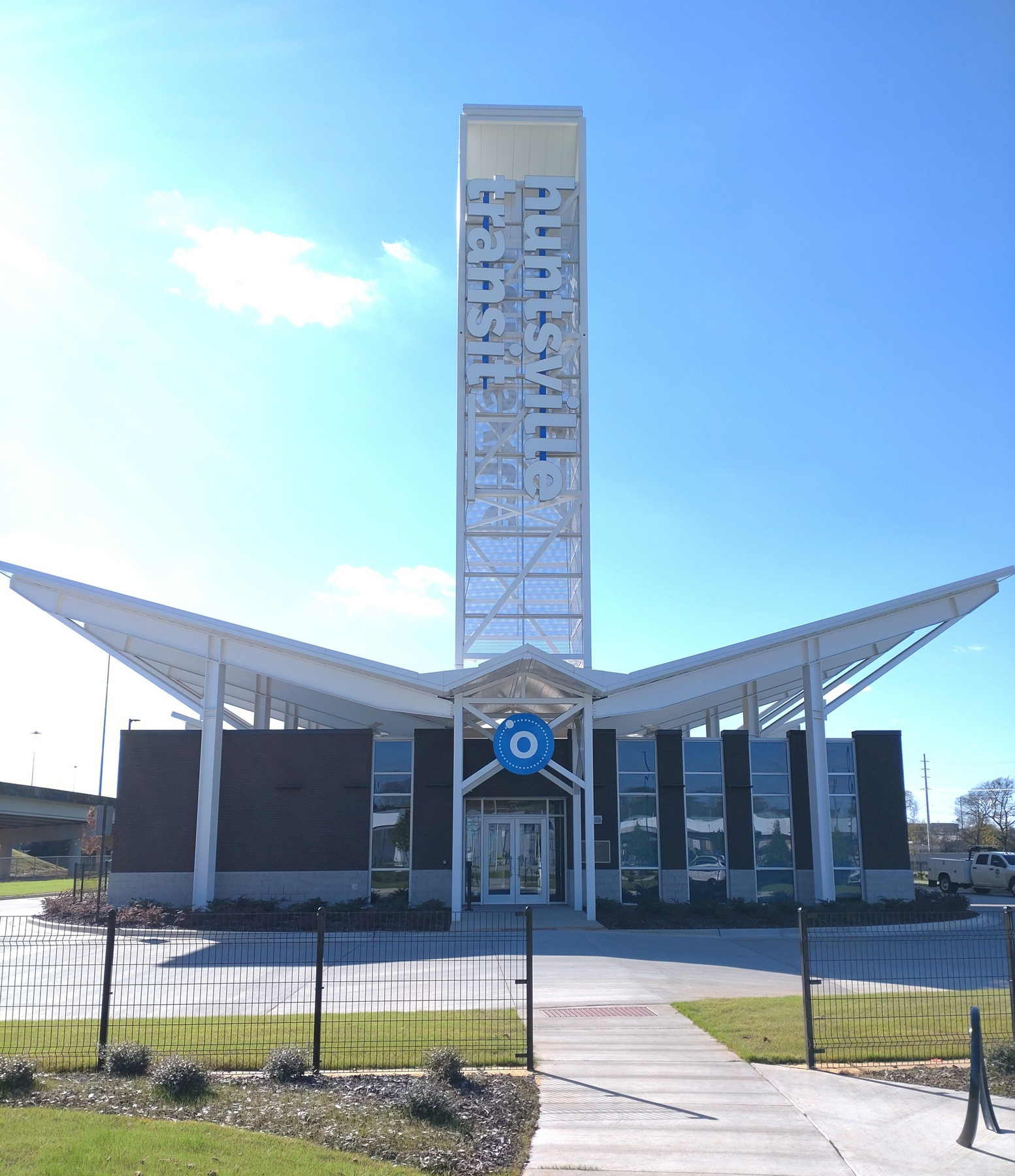
- Huntsville Transit Center at 521 Pratt Avenue
- Founded: 1990
- Headquarters: 500B Church Street
- Locale: Huntsville, AL
- Service type: Bus service
- Routes: 9 weekday 1 weekend
- Daily ridership: 2,207 (2022)
- Annual ridership: 716,087 (2025)
- Operator: City of Huntsville, Public Transportation Division
- Website: huntsvilleal.gov/orbit

The Orbit fixed-route bus system began in 1990 in response to the growing population and congestion of the city of Huntsville, Alabama. The system is run by the city of Huntsville, and is funded by city and federal funds. Alabama law prohibits state gas tax revenue to fund public transit.

== History ==
Huntsville had a streetcar system in the early 1900s linking downtown to outlying mill villages like Five Points and Lowe Mill. The system was dismantled in the late 1940s. In 1990, the city of Huntsville decided to form the Department of Parking and Public Transit, which included the Shuttle. It began with two routes, the Red and Blue Core Loops which served downtown, the Medical District and surrounding areas. By 2004, the system had expanded to ten routes and a Tourist Trolley. That year, a new bus terminal was built at Church and Cleveland Streets near the Huntsville Depot. In 2005, the city began weekend evening service to the downtown and Five Points areas. In 2006, bike racks were installed on all fifteen buses as part of the city's Greenway Master Plan.

== The system today ==
The Shuttle has a total of 9 routes, including 9 weekday routes,9 Saturday routes, the Tourist Trolley Loop, which seasonally runs six days a week, and two weekend evening routes. Routes 10, and 12 were discontinued in 2010. The system keeps a fleet of 15 buses. The regular weekday routes run from 6 AM to 9 PM. Saturday routes runs 7am to 7pm. The Tourist Loop runs from 7 AM to 7 PM. The weekend evening routes run from 7 PM to 2 AM on Friday and Saturday. Bus turnarounds range from 15 minutes downtown to one hour in outlying areas. Between 1,500 and 1,800 riders use the system daily. The number has steadily risen in recent years due to rising gas prices; however, while other transit systems have seen double-digit gains in ridership over the past year, the Shuttle's ridership has only grown by 5%. This prompted the city council to hire a consulting firm in August 2008 to see how the city can make the system more attractive to residents.

== Transit Center ==
The Huntsville Transit Center at 521 Pratt Ave. serves as the primary transfer point for Orbit. It replaced a smaller facility across Interstate 565 on Cleveland Ave built in 2004. It features fourteen bus bays, a rain garden, and a 3,880 square foot lobby waiting area and ticket office. A ribbon cutting occurred on August 29 with the building opening to the public on September 3, 2024. Fuqua & Partners served as architects for the $14.6 million project.

== Fares ==
One-way:

- Regular: $1
- Seniors, students with valid ID, and children: $.50
- Tourist Trolley: $2
- Downtown weekend evening service: Free
- Transfers: Free

== Other Services ==
The City of Huntsville Department of Parking and Public Transit also maintains the 13 public parking garages and lots in downtown Huntsville, the Access paratransit fleet, and RIDE-SHARE, the Huntsville-area carpool program. In June 2008, the department also began managing the neighboring city of Madison's paratransit system, MARS.

== Future plans ==
A park and ride is planned at Bridge Street Town Centre, a mixed-use development in Cummings Research Park West, and will become a transit hub for the western part of the city. Other park-and-rides have been discussed, but no specific locations have been selected.

Routes to the following places have been planned/discussed for when funding becomes available:

- Huntsville International Airport
- Redstone Arsenal/Marshall Space Flight Center

Other long-range transit projects that have been discussed for the Huntsville area:

- A commuter rail line between Huntsville and Decatur, with stops in Madison and Research Park.
- A light rail line linking downtown Huntsville to Ditto Landing on the Tennessee River.

== Routes ==
- 1. Red Core Loop

Madison County Courthouse, Huntsville Museum of Art, Huntsville Hospital, Parkway Place Mall, Huntsville Senior Center/Brahan Spring Park

- 2. Blue Core Loop

Same as #1, but in reverse, with one additional stop at Carousel Skate Center

- 3. Madison Square/Holmes Avenue

University of Alabama in Huntsville, Research Park East, Madison Square Mall

- 4. Madison Square/University Drive

University Drive commercial area, Madison Square Mall, Perimeter Office Park

- 5. Airport Road

Von Braun Center, Parkway Place Mall, Crestwood Medical Center, Huntsville Hospital Medical Mall

- 6. Southwest Huntsville

Von Braun Center, Westlawn, Brahan Springs Park/Senior Center, Milton Frank Stadium

- 7. Alabama A&M University

JF Drake State Technical College, Alabama A&M University, Five Points

- 8. Medaris Road/A&M

Alabama Career Center, JF Drake State Technical College, Alabama A&M University, Five Points

- 9. Northwest Huntsville/ Oakwood College

The Fountain Shopping Center, Oakwood College, Alabama Career Center

- 10. Weatherly Road (Discontinued and partially moved to 5)

Parkway Place, Airport Road, Jones Valley, Southeast Huntsville, Joe Davis Stadium

- 12. Research Park Loop (Discontinued)

UAH, Calhoun Community College, Sherwood Park, Bridge Street Town Centre, Research Park West, Westside Pavilion (Target), University Drive

- T. Tourist Loop Trolley

University Drive, Madison Square Mall, Research Park East, US Space and Rocket Center, Huntsville Botanical Garden, Huntsville Museum of Art, EarlyWorks, Alabama Constitution Village, Courthouse Square

- Weekend Evening Service

Five Points, the Medical District, the Von Braun Center, Big Spring Park (Huntsville, Alabama), and various restaurants and clubs. Runs on Fridays and Saturdays from 7PM-2AM only.

== Roster ==
Fleet number(s)	Thumbnail	Year	Manufacturer	Model	Engine	Transmission	Notes
422, 436			DesignLine	EcoSaver IV			
457			DesignLine	Eco-Smart I			
463			ElDorado National	Transmark RE			
503, 528			ElDorado National	Transmark RE			
536-537, 570-571			Collins Industries	NexBus			
576			ElDorado National	E-Z Rider II BRT			

== Fixed route ridership ==
The ridership statistics shown here are of fixed route services only and do not include demand response services.

== See also ==
- List of bus transit systems in the United States
