= Ed White Middle School =

Ed White Middle School may refer to:

- Ed White Middle School (Alabama), a former middle school within the Huntsville City Schools school district
- Ed White Middle School (Texas), a middle school within the North East Independent School District school district

== See also ==
- Edward Douglas White Catholic High School, a junior and senior high school in Thibodaux, Louisiana
