= Bypass Network (Huntsville) =

Road project in Alabama, USA

Huntsville Northern Bypass
- Martin King Jr Boulevard; Research Park Boulevard
- Type: Loop
- Length: 13.462 mi (21.665 km)
- Location: Huntsville, Alabama
- Southwest end: Interstate 565
- Major junctions: Jordan Lane; Memorial Parkway
- Northeast end: US 231

Construction
- Commissioned: 1969
- Completion: Western part: 2005 Northern part: 2025

The Huntsville Northern Bypass is a road project located in the city of Huntsville, Alabama. It is a semi-circle loop around the Northern portion of the city to alleviate traffic on University Drive (US 72) and Interstate 565. The roadway is a continuation of Research Park Boulevard AL 255. The first half of the loop was completed in 2025, while the eastern half does not have an estimated completion date. Construction of the section east of Pulaski Pike began in November 2023 with a completion cost expected to be around $53 million. The project East of Pulaski is 3.4 miles long, with an additional mile of road maintenance on existing sections of the route, signed as Alabama State Route 255 (Martin Luther King Jr Boulevard). The contract to construct this portion of the bypass was granted to the Wiregrass Construction company for $28.46 million.
