= Bob Wallace Avenue/Sparkman Drive =

Pair of thoroughfares in Hunstville, Alabama

- Length: 10.4 mi (16.7 km)
- Location: Huntsville, Alabama
- North end: US-231/431 Memorial Parkway (continues as US-72 East)
- Major junctions: SR-53 (Jordan Lane) US-72 (University Drive); I-565 US-231 Memorial Parkway
- South end: Lytle Street SE

Bob Wallace Avenue and Sparkman Drive are major thoroughfares in Huntsville, Alabama that connect to make a horseshoe-shaped road around the city. The two roads run through several residential neighborhoods and school zones including the University of Alabama in Huntsville. On average, approximately 21,000 vehicles travel along the roads each day.

== Description ==
US-72 enters the city of Huntsville over Chapman Mountain from the north east and follows exit 21 on I-565 to intersect US-231/431 (Memorial Parkway) in north Huntsville where it becomes Sparkman Drive. The five lane road travels west, intersecting Blue Spring Road, and enters into a residential area. The road then intersects Pulaski Pike before turning southwest, providing access to Highlands Elementary School and the Academy for Academics and Arts magnet school (formerly Ed White Middle School).

Sparkman Drive intersects Jordan Lane (SR-53) and continues heading southwest, intersecting Adventist Boulevard. The road then turns south, running through a residential area before traveling under University Drive (US-72), where access is provided by controlled-access ramps. Sparkman Drive continues to head south, running along the east border of Cummings Research Park and to the west of University of Alabama in Huntsville to intersect Bradford Drive and Holmes Avenue.

After passing UAH, Sparkman Drive passes over Interstate 565 and then becomes Bob Wallace Avenue. Following a sharp turn to the east, Bob Wallace Avenue passes by a service road providing access to the US Space and Rocket Center. This section of Bob Wallace is planned to house part of the future Singing River Trail of North Alabama, a 70-mile bicycling and walking trail that will connect Huntsville, Madison, Athens, and Decatur. Bob Wallace Avenue runs north of Morris Elementary School and continues east passing by the Huntsville Botanical Garden to intersect Jordan Lane and Patton Road, where Kiwanis Soccer Park is located. Heading south on Patton Road, the road provides access to gates 8 and 10 of the Redstone Arsenal.

Bob Wallace Avenue continues east to provide access to Westlawn Middle School before heading into a residential area and intersecting Triana Boulevard and other surface streets, including 1st Street Southwest which provides access to Brahan Spring Park and Milton Frank Stadium. Bob Wallace Avenue passes over Spring Branch creek to intersect Leeman Ferry Road and Memorial Parkway. After passing under the Parkway, Bob Wallace continues east to cross over a former Louisville and Nashville Railroad rail line and travels south of Huntsville High School where the road narrows to four lanes from five. Bob Wallace continues through another residential area to intersect Whitesburg Drive, followed by California Street where the road then narrows down to two lanes, and reaching its southern terminus at Lytle Street.

== History ==
Sparkman Drive and Bob Wallace Avenue were once two separate streets before Interstate 565 was built in the early 1990s. Bob Wallace Avenue connected directly to Old Madison Pike and Sparkman Drive intersected to two roads just south of what was State Route 20 (now Interstate 565).

Prior to 1958, Bob Wallace Avenue was actually 13th Street West. On November 1, 1958 13th Street West was officially renamed to Bob Wallace Avenue in accordance with an ordinance (ordinance no. 58-165) that renamed much of the streets within the city of Huntsville.

== Major Intersections ==
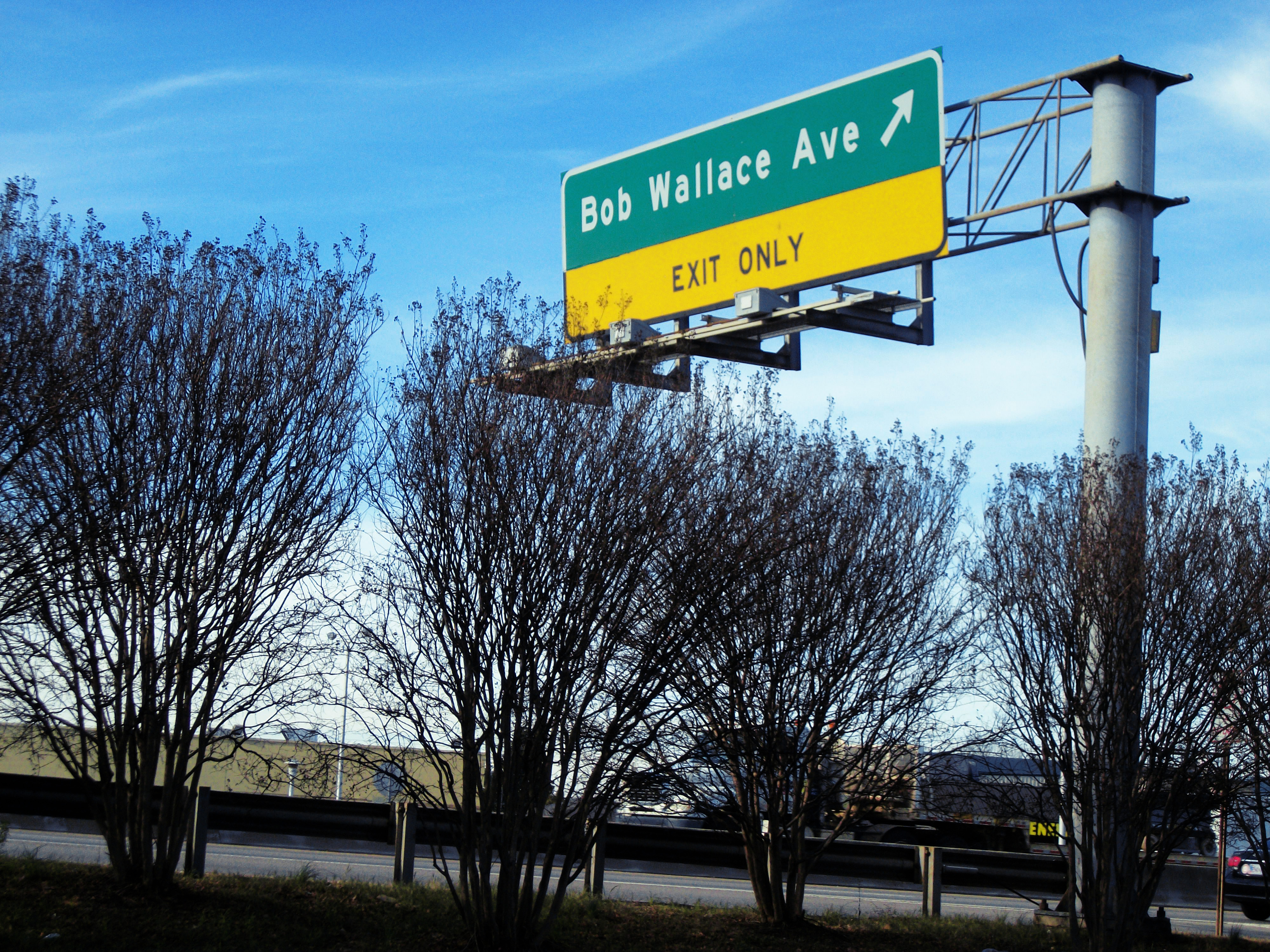
An exit sign on Memorial Parkway for Bob Wallace Ave.

Road	Notes
US-231/431 (Memorial Pkwy.)	North end
Pulaski Pike NW	
SR-53 (Jordan Ln. NW)	
Adventist Blvd. NW	Provides access to Oakwood University
US-72 (University Dr.)	Access via controlled-access ramps
Bradford Dr. NW/Holmes Ave. NW	Access to Cummings Research Park
I-565	Becomes Bob Wallace Avenue, exit 15 on I-565
Jordan Ln. SW/Patton Rd. SW	Leads to Gate 10 of Redstone Arsenal
Triana Blvd. SW	
1st St. SW	Leads to Brahan Spring Park
Leeman Ferry Rd. SW	
US-231 (Memorial Pkwy.)	
Whitesburg Dr. S	
California St. SE	South end

== Education ==
Multiple schools and colleges are located on or directly accessible via Sparkman Drive and Bob Wallace Avenue.

- Berachah Academy
- Academy for Academics and Arts (formerly Ed White Middle School)
- Morris Elementary School
- Highland Elementary School
- Huntsville High School
- Westlawn Middle School
- University of Alabama in Huntsville

== Public Transportation ==
Multiple City of Huntsville shuttle bus stops are located in various locations along the two roads.
