= The Parkway =

The Parkway is the name of Interstate 376 in Pennsylvania.

The Parkway may also refer to:

- Benjamin Franklin Parkway in Philadelphia
- Memorial Parkway (US Highway 231) in Huntsville, Alabama
- Garden State Parkway in New Jersey
- Jackie Robinson Parkway in New York City
- A312 road in London, England
