= University Drive =

Road in Huntsville, Alabama

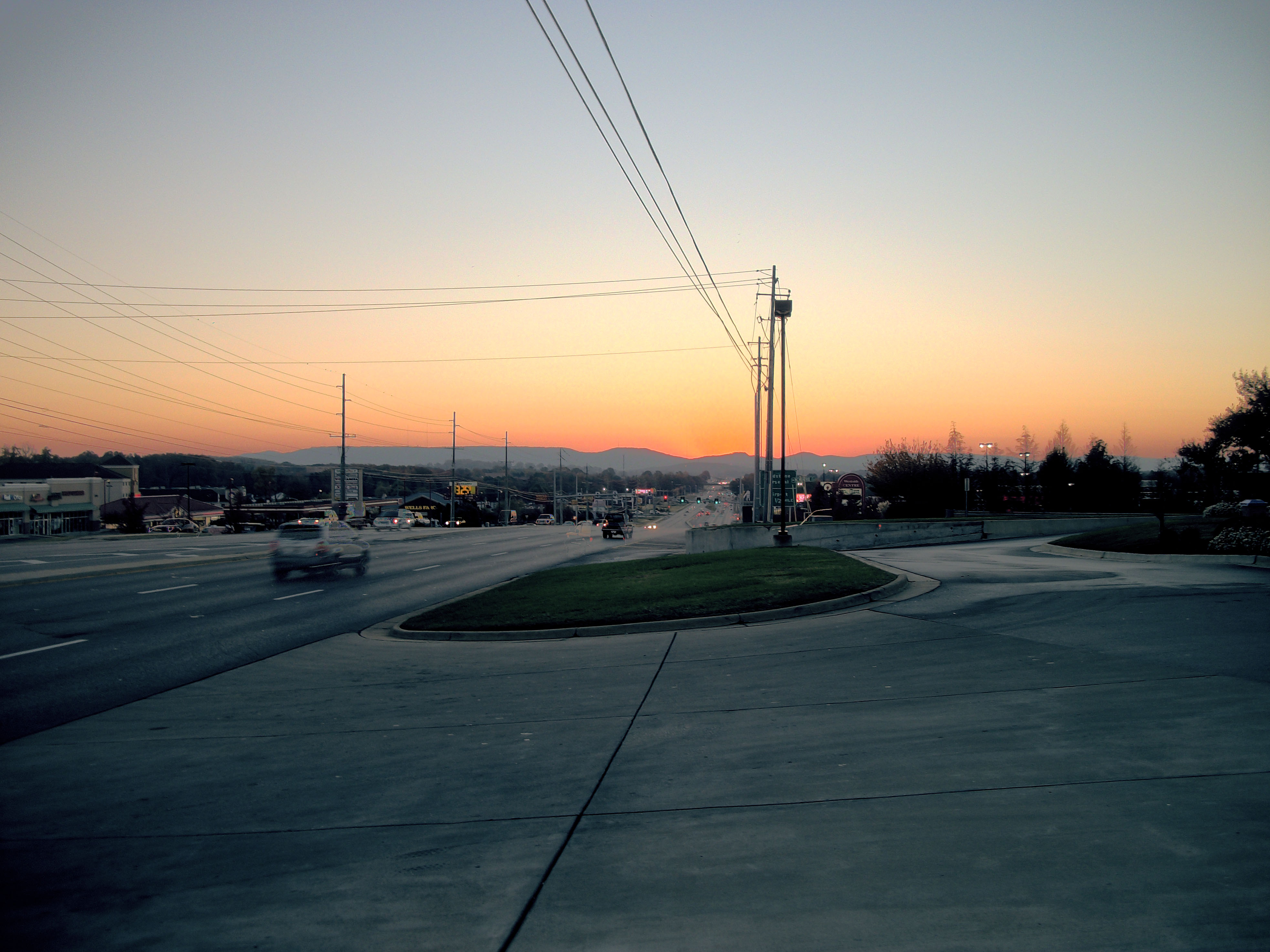
- Length: 7.1 mi (11.4 km)
- Location: Huntsville, Alabama
- East end: Church Street (continues as Pratt Ave)
- Major junctions: Research Park Blvd; Jordan Lane; Memorial Parkway
- West end: Jeff Road (continues as US 72)

University Drive is a major east–west thoroughfare in Huntsville, Alabama, following U.S. Route 72 (US 72) into the city from the west. The highway carries on average approximately 56,000 vehicles a day with a speed limit at 45 mph (72 km/h).

== Route description ==
From the west, US 72 enters Madison County inside the city limits of Huntsville and runs east eventually running through the north tip of the city of Madison, where it splits Huntsville and Madison's city limits, with Huntsville to the north, Madison to the south. At Jeff Road, the four-lane US 72 takes on the name of University Drive and passes to the south of Huntsville Memorial Gardens and over Indian Creek, where it meets Providence Main Street, where it widens to seven lanes.

Continuing east, University Drive passes through multiple shopping centers and car dealerships. University Drive meets Research Park Blvd/Alabama 255 with a six-ramp partial cloverleaf interchange and passes just to the north of MidCity Huntsville, formerly Madison Square Mall. University Drive then passes to the south of Huntsville West Shopping Center. An overpass over Sparkman Drive with on-and off-ramps provides access to the University of Alabama in Huntsville. Following the interchange, the road runs under a pedestrian and bicycle bridge and then meets Alabama 53/Jordan Lane.

University Drive eventually connects to Memorial Parkway, where US 72 splits off and heads north with US 231/431. Going through the intersection, University Drive narrows to five lanes and intersects Church Street, where it becomes Pratt Ave. Pratt Ave continues east, directly connecting to Five Points and then runs up Monte Sano Mountain.

== Major intersections ==
Road	Notes
Jeff Road	
Providence Main Street	
Enterprise Way	Accesses Cummings Research Park
Research Park Blvd/Northern Bypass	Limited access highway connecting to Interstate 565
Old Monrovia Road	Accesses MidCity Huntsville, formerly Madison Square Mall
Wynn Drive	
Sparkman Drive	Accesses University of Alabama in Huntsville
Jordan Lane	
Pulaski Pike	
Memorial Parkway	Accesses Interstate 565; US 72 splits off and heads north
Church Street	Accesses Downtown Huntsville

== Retail ==
University Drive is a major commercial thoroughfare through west Huntsville that includes a number of shopping centers, hotels, fast food locations, and other various businesses including two movie theaters, Carmike Huntsville 10 and Madison Square 12.

Shopping Centers:

- Midcity
- The Fountain
- Northwood Plaza Shopping Center
- Westside Center

Major retail stores include:

- Trader Joe's
- Books-A-Million
- Best Buy
- Sam's Club
- Super Target
- Walmart Supercenter

== Transportation ==
Access to shuttle buses provided by the city of Huntsville are available along University Drive.

== See also ==
- Huntsville, Alabama
- Alabama State Route 255
- Governors Drive
- Memorial Parkway
