= Lee High School (Huntsville, Alabama) =

Public school in Huntsville, Alabama, United States

- Lee High School-August 2012

Location
- 2500 Meridian Street; Huntsville, Alabama 35811; United States; 34°45′14″N 86°34′26″W

Information
- Type: Public high school
- Established: 1958 (68 years ago)
- School district: Huntsville City Schools
- CEEB code: 011467
- Principal: Tony Woods
- Teaching staff: 48.21 (on an FTE basis)
- Grades: 9–12
- Enrollment: 861 (2023–2024)
- Student to teacher ratio: 17.86
- Colors: Blue and grey
- Mascot: General
- Website: www.huntsvillecityschools.org/o/lhs

Lee High School is a four-year public high school that serves students in grades 9–12 from Huntsville, in Madison County, Alabama in the United States, as a part of Huntsville City Schools.

== History ==
Lee High School was named for the Lee Highway (U.S. Route 72) that ran in front of the old school location in the 1950s, which, in turn, was named after Confederate general Robert E. Lee. The school's mascot is now a five-star general and, for many years, a painting of General Robert E. Lee mounted on his horse and holding the Confederate flag was on the Gymnasium wall. In 1974 the flag was painted over and the Generals' mascot is now held to represent no specific person.

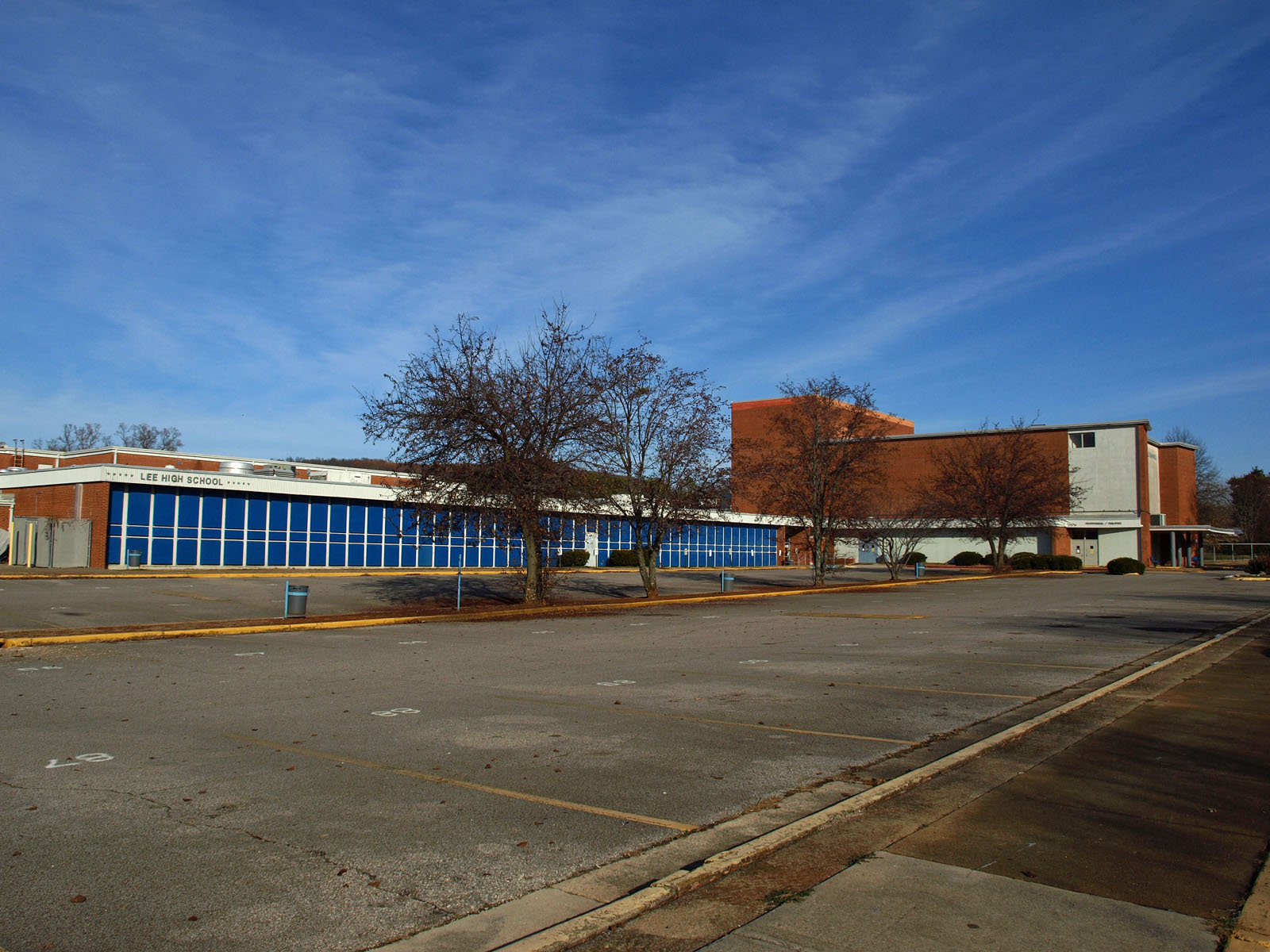
Lee Jr. High/High School (1958–2012) at 606 Forrest Circle site-2010 photo

The original building was constructed in 1957 and opened in the later part of the 1957–1958 school year. The current facility for Lee High School was begun in 2010 and was occupied during the 2012–2013 school year. According to the 1967–1968 Lee High School Student Handbook:

... Lee High School was established as a junior high school during the second semester of the 1957–58 school term. In the school term of 1963–64 Lee became a full high school, due to the procedure of discontinuing the lower grades and adding higher ones. The class of 1964 became Lee's first graduating class. (Lee was Huntsville's Fourth High School. Huntsville, Butler and Councill were operating in 1964) During the past (1966–1967) school year, Lee's enrollment was approximately 1700 students. The enrollment approximately for the 1967–68 school term is 1600 students. Still the need for more classrooms has caused Lee to add to its present building four new portable classrooms, raising the number of portable classrooms to seven ...

The school operated as a junior high school to allow for the eventual closure of nearby Rison High School and changed its status in tandem with the opening of Chapman Junior High School (later, Chapman Middle School). In 1964, Lee Jr. High School became Lee High School.

In 1986, the Huntsville City Schools created the Lee Arts and Pre-Engineering Magnet programs. This program draws students from other schools in the city to Lee for study and opportunities in specific areas. The arts magnet has been rather successful, attracting talented students for theater and vocal music opportunities.

The Huntsville City Schools constructed a new Lee High School facility on Meridian Street, North (next to the original location). The new building is 250,000 square feet (23,000 m^{2}) and designed for 1,200 students.

One issue surmounted during construction was the Norfolk Southern railroad adjacent to the school; a raised bridge was erected to allow students to access playing fields that are located across the track from the classrooms.

Although the school's scheduled opening was established as the beginning of the 2012–2013 school year, the new Lee Lyric Theatre had its debut production in June 2012. The production, Oliver!, was a collaboration between the school and Independent Musical Productions.

On August 16, 2012, a ribbon-cutting ceremony marked the opening of the new Lee High School.

The new facility also houses "New Century Technology High School", which was a virtual entity at Columbia High School since the mid-1990s.

== Magnet programs ==
The Huntsville City Schools Performance and Creative Arts Magnet programs are located at Lee High School. Students are admitted to these programs through a combination of interviews, scholastic achievement, and auditions. The magnet programs include Cinematography, Creative Writing, Dance, Orchestra, Photography, Technical Theatre, Theatrical Performance, Visual Arts, and Vocal Performance. In addition to their magnet courses (usually two to three hours per day), students follow a full complement of academic coursework, including AP and pre-AP coursework for most students.

== Academics ==
Lee High School offers a broad array of academic subjects, including a full range of pre-AP and AP courses.

== Clubs and organizations ==
The school sponsors a number of clubs and organization in which students may participate.

- Anchor Club
- Anime Brigade
- Art Club
- Beta Club
- FCA: Sponsor
- Gamma Phi Delta
- French Club
- German Club
- Mu Alpha Theta
- National Honor Society
- ODD
- Peer Helpers
- Robotics
- Scholars Bowl
- SGA: Sponsor
- Sigma Phi Psi
- Band

=== Lee High School Band ===
Lee High's band, The Marching Generals, was awarded First Place in "The Greatest Bands in Dixie", awarded during Mardi Gras in New Orleans in February 1976. As a result, the band was selected to represent the State of Alabama at the inauguration of President Jimmy Carter on January 20, 1977. Further, the Marching Generals became the first Huntsville City Schools' band to march in the Macy's Thanksgiving Day Parade on November 22, 1984, leading the parade. {Baccus, 1984} They also got to be in the AAMU Homecoming parades and Magic City Classic multiple years

== Sports ==
- Baseball
- Basketball
- Bowling
- Cheerleading
- Dancing
- Diving
- Football
- Golf
- Soccer
- Softball
- Swimming
- Tennis
- Track
- Volleyball

== Bus accident ==
On November 20, 2006, a school bus transporting Lee High School students to a local trade school careened over a retaining wall on an elevated part of Interstate 565 at the U.S. highway 231 exit and plummeted 30 feet. Investigating agencies at federal, state and local levels include the NTSB, Alabama State Department of Transportation, Alabama Department of Public Safety, and Huntsville Police Department. Crestwood Medical Center and Huntsville Hospital, the two local hospitals, both activated their Mass Casualty action plans. Emergency response personnel from throughout the area were called upon to assist in rescue efforts.

== Notable alumni ==
- J. D. Blair, musician
- Buddy Boshers, former pitcher for the Los Angeles Angels, Minnesota Twins, and Toronto Blue Jays
- Kobe Brown (2019), professional basketball player for Los Angeles Clippers
- Keith Butler, Seattle Seahawks linebacker (1978–1987), Pittsburgh Steelers assistant coach
- Ron Cooper, secondary coach of Texas A&M, former head coach at University of Louisville, Alabama A&M
- Kim Dickens (1983), actress
- Bobby Eaton, professional wrestler
- Condredge Holloway, quarterback, Canadian Football Hall of Fame
- Craig Kimbrel (2006), pitcher in Major League Baseball, currently unattached, 6-time All-Star, 2011 Rookie of the Year
- Ann Levine, law school commentator and consultant
- Jim McBride, songwriter, 1995 Alabama Music Hall of Fame Music Creator Award
- Amobi Okoye, Defensive Lineman, first-round selection in 2007 NFL draft
- Israel Raybon, football player
- Trent Scott, NFL offensive tackle
- Darian Stewart, NFL defensive back
- Chester Rogers, receiver for Tennessee Titans
- Ned Vaughn, actor

== Notable faculty ==
- Phillip Ensler, former social studies teacher, member of the Alabama House of Representatives
