= Von Braun Astronomical Society =

Society of astronomers

Coordinates: 34°44′59″N 86°30′45″W

The Von Braun Astronomical Society is a society of amateur and professional astronomers dedicated to education and public outreach on behalf of astronomy based in Huntsville, Alabama, United States.

The society has an observatory and planetarium located east of Huntsville, in Monte Sano State Park.

Another important goal of the society is to inspire the youth of the community through the awarding of the Ann Sanford Award, and by including a student on the board of directors.

== History ==
The Von Braun Astronomical Society was founded as the Rocket City Astronomical Association by Wernher von Braun and a group of the original rocket scientists brought over from Germany after World War II.

The facility played a historic role in the Apollo Moon landing. Von Braun and his colleagues used the newly installed 21" Classical Cassegrain telescope in the Swanson Observatory (then the Monte Sano Observatory) to search for possible landing sites for the Apollo program.

== Facilities ==
Planetarium

The VBAS planetarium consists of a 33 ft diameter dome and utilizes a Spitz A3P planetarium projector. The planetarium seats approximately 80 visitors. An interesting fact about the planetarium is that the dome was originally used as part of a first stage fuel tank mock up used for setting up tooling jigs for manufacturing the fuel tanks for the second stage of the Saturn V rocket. It was donated to VBAS by North American Aviation in the mid-60s.

Swanson Observatory

The Swanson Observatory consists of a 21" Cassegrain-Newtonian telescope. This facility is the original building on the property. In 2009 it was upgraded and refurbished to accommodate electronic observation and video. The Swanson Observatory dome slit was repaired and widened in the 90’s using curved aluminum I beams from the Sky Lab engineering model.

The Swanson Observatory is named in honor of Conrad Swanson.

Angele Observatory

Named for Wilhelm Angele of von Braun's rocket team, the Angele Observatory consists of a roll-off roof observatory housing a 16" Celestron Schmidt-Cassegrain Telescope. It was part of a special order of a pair of telescopes from the infant NASA to explore possible lunar landing sites.

Stuhlinger Solar Telescope

VBAS operates the Stuhlinger Solar Telescope. It was finished around 1994 and includes a 12" primary and a 4.75" first surface heliostat mirror. It projects a 24" image of the Sun on the whiteboard in the Angele foyer. This telescope was a personal project of Dr. Ernst Stuhlinger, a member of the Von Braun team.

== See also ==
- List of astronomical societies
