= Madison County Nature Trail =

Park in Madison County, Alabama, United States

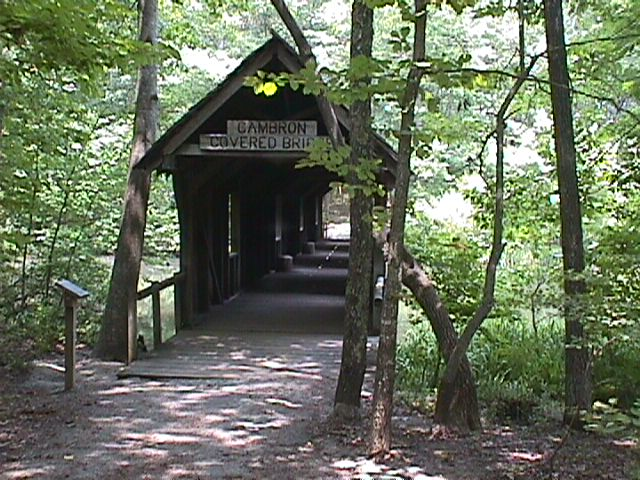
- Cambron Covered Bridge
- Interactive map of Madison County Nature Trail
- Location: Huntsville, Alabama
- Coordinates: 34.59771°N 86.51681°W
- Area: 72 acres (29 ha)
- Elevation: 1,340 feet (410 m)
- Opened: 1975
- Operator: Madison County, Alabama
- Open: All year
- Hiking trails: 1.5 miles (2.4 km)

The Madison County Nature Trail a.k.a. Green Mountain Nature Trail is a 72-acre (29 ha) park in Huntsville, Alabama. It is located above the surrounding communities atop Green Mountain in southeast Huntsville. A 1.5-mile (2.4 km) trail surrounds 17-acre (6.9 ha) Sky Lake. Facilities include a covered bridge, picnic area and open air pavilion. The Nature Trail is recognized as a Treasure Forest by the Alabama Forestry Commission. It is also considered a Wildlife Sanctuary. The entire park is owned, operated and funded by the Madison County Commission although it lies within the city limits of Huntsville.

== Facilities ==
The Park is open free to the public each day from 7 a.m. until 30 minutes prior to sunset, closing only on Christmas Day and New Year's Day.

The trail consists of 1.5-mile (2.4 km) loop with additional side trails. It is a good trail for beginners, fairly flat and wide footbed with good signage. 0.5 miles (0.80 km) of the trail is a Braille trail. The trail crosses the Cambron Covered Bridge named after Joe E. Cambron, who was the Madison County Bridge Foreman from 1958 to 1974. The bridge makes for great photos, especially in black and white A historic log cabin is open to explore. The log cabin was originally built about 1810 somewhere near New Market. It was donated to Madison County by the Herbert P. Walker family, brought to the Nature Trail, and reassembled. Other facilities include an open-air pavilion, A-frame chapel, outdoor classroom, picnic area and accessible rest rooms. Fishing is allowed Monday through Friday only, (fee charged).

== History ==
The Madison County Nature Trail was constructed beginning in 1974 with completion in 1975. The construction was financed jointly by the U.S. Department of Housing and Urban Development and the Madison County Commission. It has been noted that the chairman, James Record, had a special love for nature and the environment and was instrumental in the building of the Nature Trail.

== See also ==
- Parks and Greenways in Huntsville
- List of hiking trails in Alabama
