= Alabama State Route 255 =

State highway in Alabama, United States

State Route 255
- Research Park Boulevard
- SR 255 highlighted in red

Route information
- Maintained by ALDOT
- Length: 10.052 mi (16.177 km)

Major junctions
- South end: Rideout Road in Redstone Arsenal
- I-565 / US 72 Alt. in Huntsville; US 72 in Huntsville; SR 53 in Huntsville
- North end: Bob Wade Lane in Huntsville

Location
- Country: United States
- State: Alabama
- Counties: Madison

Highway system
- Alabama State Highway System; Interstate; US; State
← SR 253	→ SR 257

(State Route 255 or SR 255), known as Research Park Boulevard, is a state highway that runs from I-565 to Bob Wade Lane on the north and west sides of Huntsville in Madison County, Alabama. Much of the route is a limited access highway, with the entire route planned to be limited access. Plans call for the road to be extended to create a near-complete bypass around Huntsville. A section from Pulaski Pike to North Memorial Parkway/US 431/US 231 is under construction.

Portions of the highway are known as the Northern Bypass as well as Dr. Martin Luther King Jr. Highway. The extension of AL SR 255 from near Pulaski Pike to Memorial Parkway/US 431 is proposed to be named Bob Wade Lane, according to Huntsville City Council.

== History ==
SR 255 was created around 1969 as part of a proposed northern bypass of Huntsville. The original route ran from Redstone Arsenal Gate 9 to US 72 as limited access highway with exits for U.S. Route 72 Alternate/SR 20 (now Interstate 565), Old Madison Pike, and ending at US 72, with plans to extend north. The interchange with SR 20 was intended only to provide access to the Arsenal's Gate 9 and accordingly had an incomplete set of ramps; going southbound on SR 255 there was no direct access to SR 20, and from SR 20 it was only possible to enter SR 255 going southbound. SR 255 only appeared on maps and was unsigned, and was better known as Rideout Road. The road continues southward past Gate 9 into Redstone Arsenal and actually has an additional interchange at the Toftoy Thruway, but this is not considered part of the state route.

A fourth interchange opened in 1989. At that time, Bradford Drive was overpassed over SR 255 to connect the existing east side of Cummings Research Park to the recently opened west side. A set of ramps provided full access between the two roads. During the construction of I-565 in 1989, a truck towing a crane dislodged the southbound bridge over SR 20 forcing an earlier replacement of the bridge. SR 255 was first signed as an exit off of 565.

SR 255 was extended north in 1996 to SR 53. The interchange with US 72 was modified as part of this work, and a third southbound lane was added between US 72 and Bradford Drive. However, an existing cloverleaf ramp that provided access from US 72 westbound to SR 255 southbound was eliminated; it is now necessary for westbound US 72 traffic to make a left turn across the eastbound lanes in order to reach southbound SR 255.

SR 255 was originally named Rideout Road in honor of 1st Lt. Percy Rideout, who was killed in action in France on October 8, 1918, and was posthumously promoted and awarded the Distinguished Service Cross for "extraordinary heroism in action". In 2001, the road was renamed Research Park Boulevard for Cummings Research Park, which the road bisects. (The southward extension into the Arsenal is still named Rideout Road. Additionally, a small road on the original alignment north of US 72 is named Rideout Road.)

In 2005, a three-mile (4.8 km) extension was constructed to connect with Bob Wade Lane on the north side of Huntsville. This section was named in honor of Martin Luther King Jr. and built to the same road standards as the present at-grade portion of SR 255, allowing for future upgrade to limited access. The road was built as part of a deal with the Toyota Motor Manufacturing Alabama Plant to allow faster access to I-565.

In 2013, the at-grade intersection with SR 53 was replaced with an interchange. As part of this work, existing at-grade intersections with Blake Bottom Road and Dan Tibbs Road were eliminated, making the route all freeway from the Arsenal boundary to SR 53. These roads provide access to numerous subdivisions in northwestern Huntsville. That action created a traffic bottleneck in the afternoon, as traffic going from northbound SR 255 to these roads has to take the SR 53 ramp and then make a U-turn at the interchange to get to the frontage road intersections on the southbound side. A plan was created for an overpass at Blake Bottom Road to provide access from the northbound side of SR 255 but, in 2012, the Alabama DOT informed the city of Huntsville that the state will not pay for this project. After years of debate, in 2017, the ALDOT reached an agreement with Madison County to build the interchange; the county announced on September 10 that work would begin before the end of the year. The interchange opened in 2020.

== Future plans ==
A $500 million southern bypass through Redstone Arsenal, which would extend SR 255 south from its current terminus at I-565 to US 231 in south Huntsville, has been proposed. It would become part of the proposed Memphis–Huntsville–Atlanta highway. Shortly after the September 11 attacks, the project was put on hold indefinitely due to military security concerns. Subsequently, the route was re-planned, and the current plan does not call for using any part of SR 255.

In late 2020, the city of Huntsville was to begin construction to extend SR 255 to US 231/US 431 North towards Meridianville, which will replace Bob Wade Lane. Long-range plans call for SR 255 to be built east and south to US 72 east of Huntsville. The construction phase of this extension is scheduled to start in 2024. In December 2013, the Huntsville City Council approved a sales tax increase to raise funds for this and other road projects around Huntsville; this went into effect March 1, 2014.

== Major junctions ==
The entire route is in Madison County.

Location	mi	km	Destinations	Notes
Huntsville	0.000	0.000	Rideout Road	Redstone Arsenal Gate 9; southern terminus
	0.435	0.700	I-565 / US 72 Alt. – Decatur	I-565 exit 14
Huntsville	0.9	1.4	Old Madison Pike	Interchange
Huntsville	1.9	3.1	Bradford Drive	Interchange. Construction of an additional exit ramp started in 2020 and will provide a connection for northbound traffic to exit to Corporate Drive for better access to the new mixed use development known as MidCity
Huntsville	2.853	4.591	US 72 (University Drive/SR 2) – Huntsville, Athens	Interchange
Huntsville	3.9	6.3	Oakwood Road	Interchange
Huntsville	4.9	7.9	Plummer Road	Interchange
Huntsville	6.350	10.219	SR 53 – Ardmore, Huntsville	Interchange (opened 2013). An additional fly-over was opened in 2019 for Blake Bottom Road.
Huntsville	7.2	11.6	Northern end of freeway	
Huntsville	7.7	12.4	Kelly Cemetery Road	At-grade intersection
Huntsville	8.7	14.0	Pulaski Pike	At-grade intersection, signalled
Huntsville	10.052	16.177	Bob Wade Lane	Northern terminus; continuation north
1.000 mi = 1.609 km; 1.000 km = 0.621 mi
