= Big Cove, Alabama =

- Unincorporated community
- Location in Alabama Location in the United States
- Coordinates: 34°40′02″N 86°29′20″W
- Country: United States
- State: Alabama
- County: Madison
- Elevation: 620 ft (189 m)
- Time zone: UTC-6 (Central (CST))
  - Summer (DST): UTC-5 (CDT)
- ZIP code: 35763
- Area code: 256
- GNIS feature ID: 146693

Big Cove is an unincorporated community in Madison County, Alabama, United States. It is located roughly seven miles southeast of downtown Huntsville. Big Cove also encompasses the growing community of Hampton Cove. The community of Big Cove does not have its own address. The address is shared with the town Owens Cross Roads located roughly 10 miles southeast of Big Cove and shared address with Huntsville.

== History ==
The area in the gap between Monte Sano and Keel mountains has been known as Big Cove since 1807. The name Big Cove was simply derived from a description of the surrounding geography.

Big Cove rests at the foot of Green, Huntsville, and Monte Sano mountains. It was named by John Clan Grayson, the first white settler and permanent resident of the area. It is bordered to the south by Owens Cross Roads, Alabama, whose zip code encompasses most of the community known as Big Cove. The northern area of the community, known by locals as the "upper end" is a part of the Brownsboro, Alabama, zip code, and has largely been annexed into the Huntsville City limits.

It was largely a farming community for many years; however, many of the old farms have been sold out of the families who had owned the land for generations, and subdivisions have begun to grow where soy bean, corn, and cotton, were once major cash crops.
