= Huntsville Botanical Garden =

Botanical garden in Huntsville, Alabama

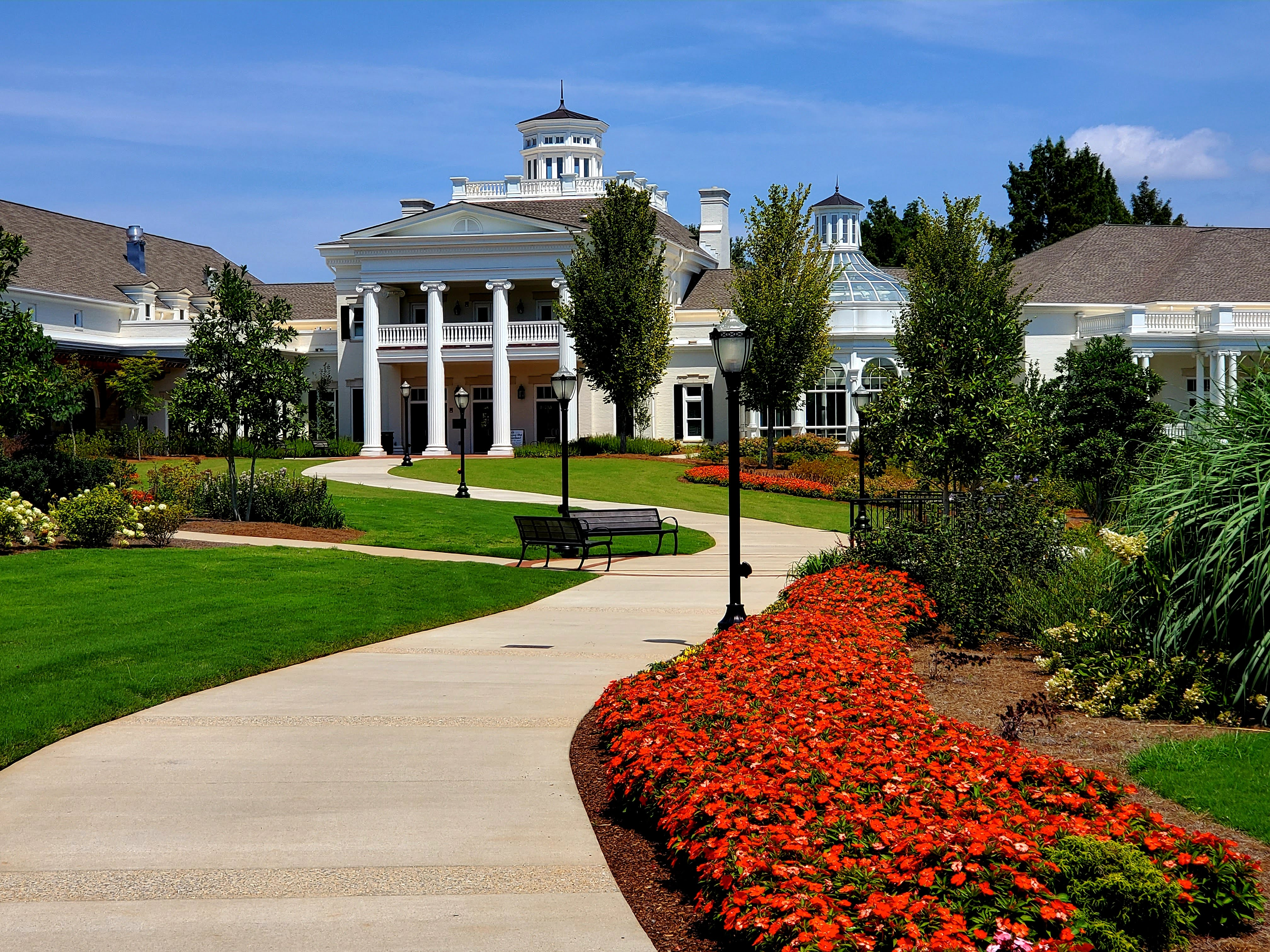
- Propst Guest Center
- Interactive map of Huntsville Botanical Garden
- Location: 4747 Bob Wallace Avenue, Huntsville, AL 35805
- Coordinates: 34.707°N 86.633°W
- Area: 118 acres (48 ha)
- Established: 1988
- Visitors: 350,000
- Open: Year-round
- Website: https://hsvbg.org/

The Huntsville Botanical Garden is a 118 acres (480,000 m^{2}) botanical garden located at 4747 Bob Wallace Avenue, Huntsville, Alabama, near the U.S. Space & Rocket Center. It is open year-round for a fee. The garden is ranked third on the list of Alabama's top paid tourist attractions, receiving 353,841 visitors in 2018.

== History ==
The idea for the creation of a botanical garden in Huntsville was first proposed by fourteen people in December 1979. In January 1980, the Huntsville-Madison County Botanical Garden Society was founded and held its first official meeting. The members of the new society persistently attended City Council meetings and politely asked for funding until they were offered 35 acres and three years to raise $200,000, which the city said that it would match. The funding goal was met in just six months.

In January 1983, it was decided that the gardens would be built on property leased to the city from the Alabama Space Science Commission. In late 1984, a volunteer crew began to clear the land. In October 1985, a southern magnolia was planted to dedicate the new botanical garden. The Huntsville Botanical Garden officially opened in 1988.

When the Huntsville Botanical Garden first opened, there were no buildings or restrooms; visitors only drove through. The first master plan for the garden was adopted in 1991. The children's garden and butterfly center opened in 2006. In 2017, the Huntsville Botanical Garden formally unveiled its new $16 million, 30,000 square-foot guest center.

The Huntsville Botanical Garden has twenty Classical Doric columns from the 1914 Madison County Courthouse that was demolished in 1964. Five of these limestone columns are arranged in a circle at the entrance to the garden, and four more were used as part of the entrance gate.

== Gardens ==
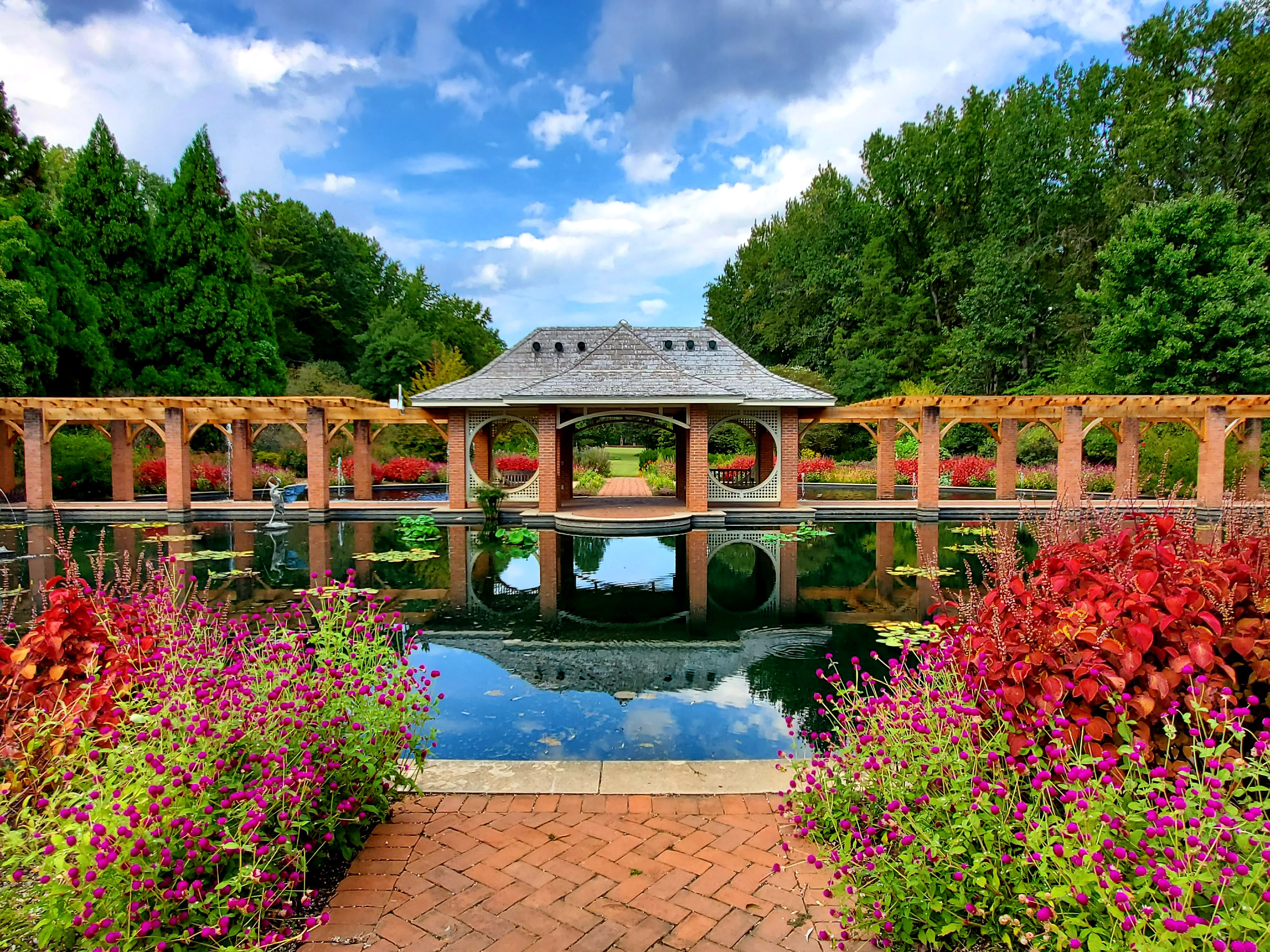
Aquatic Garden

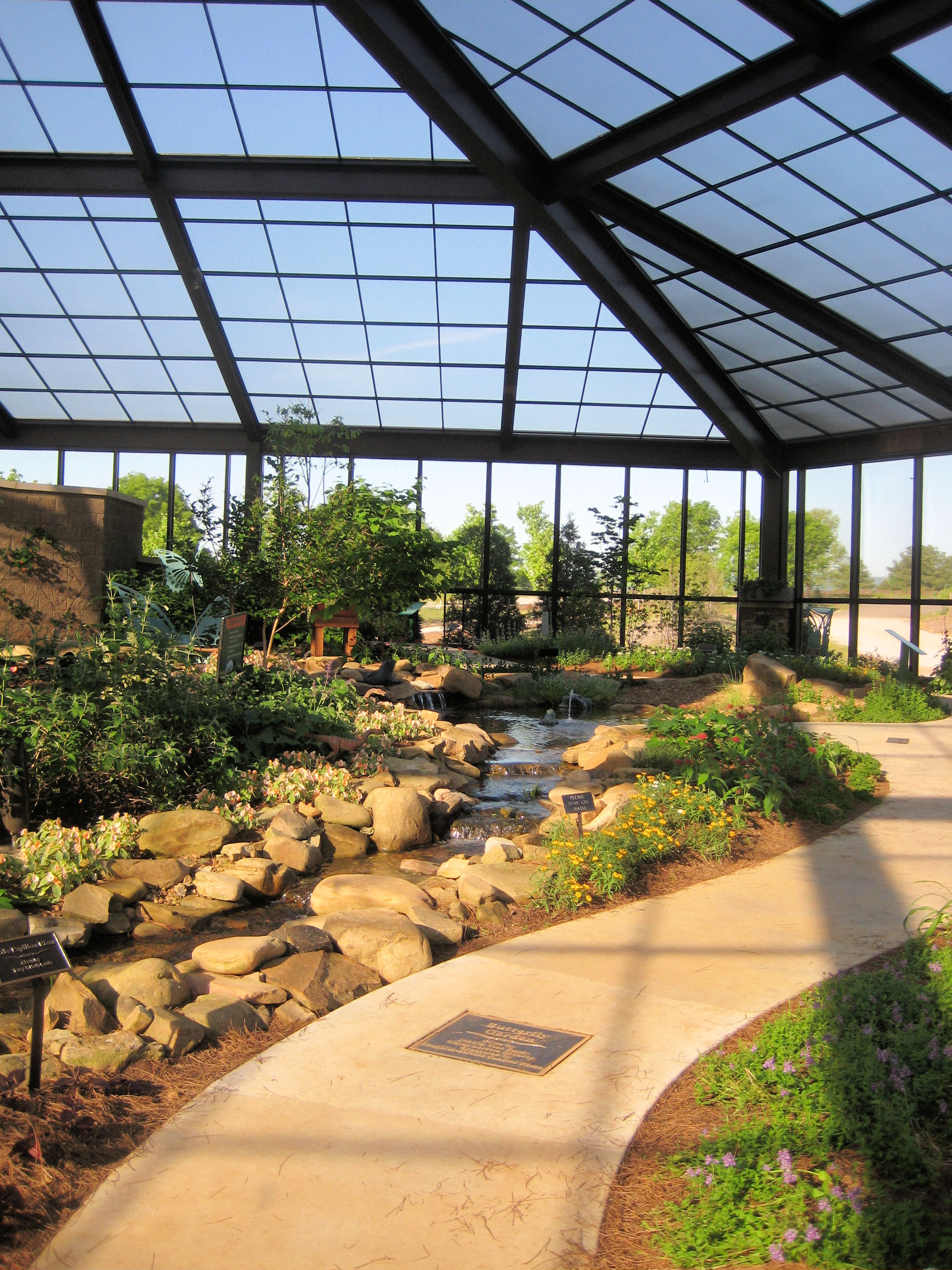
Butterfly House

The gardens include a seasonal butterfly house, and aquatic, annual, daylily, fern, herb, perennial, rose, and wildflower gardens, as well as a nature path and collection of Flowering Dogwood trees. Specific sections of the garden are as follows:

- Nature center - overlooks Little Smith Lake, houses the open-aired butterfly house, open May through September
- Biblical garden, featuring plants mentioned in the Bible
- Central Corridor - with perennial garden, aquatic garden, and bulb and annual garden.
- Daylily Garden - over 675 cultivars of daylilies.
- Dogwood Trail - numerous Flowering Dogwood (Cornus florida) trees, including a hundred-year-old dogwood transplanted to the site, along a forest path.
- Fern Glade - almost 150 species of ferns, including Christmas Fern (Polystichum acrostichoides), Northern Maidenhair Fern (Adiantum pedatum), Southern Maidenhair Fern (Adiantum capillus-veneris), Sensitive Fern (Onoclea sensibilis), Royal Fern (Osmunda spectabilis), and Cinnamon Fern (Osmundastrum cinnamomeum).
- Herb Garden - 14 theme gardens and a cottage.
- Nature Trail - paths through an indigenous southeastern lowland forest, with Black Tupelo (Nyssa sylvatica), Red Maple (Acer rubrum), Sycamore (Platanus occidentalis), and sweetgum (Liquidambar styraciflua) trees, and undergrowth including Sweet William (Phlox divaricata), Wild Columbine (Aquilegia canadensis), Foamflower (Tiarella cordifolia), Scarlet Sage (Salvia coccinea), Bellflower (Campanula americana), and Black-eyed Susan (Rudbeckia hirta).
- Azalea Trail - over 3000 azaleas native to the southeast U.S., and some native to Asia.
- Vegetable Garden - four model gardens for the home gardener.

== See also ==
- List of botanical gardens and arboretums in Alabama
- Parks and Greenways in Huntsville
