= Parkway Place Mall =

Shopping mall in Alabama

- Parkway Place sign
- Location: Huntsville, Alabama, United States
- Coordinates: 34.707°N 86.587°W
- Opened: October 16, 2002
- Owner: CBL & Associates Properties, Inc.
- Num. of stores: 70
- Num. of anchor tenants: 2
- Floor area: 643,135 sq ft (59,749.2 m^{2})
- Floors: 2
- Website: www.parkwayplacemall.com

Parkway Place Mall is a shopping mall in Huntsville, Alabama. It opened on October 16, 2002. Parkway Place replaced the older Parkway City Mall, which was torn down to allow for the newer facility. Offering a total of 643,135 square feet (59,749.2 m^{2}) and 70 in-line stores, Parkway Place is anchored by Dillard's and Belk. The mall is the only indoor shopping mall in Huntsville.

Parkway Place offers shoppers several stores that are unique to the Huntsville market, including, Torrid, Build-A-Bear Workshop, American Eagle/Aerie, and Chico's. The mall has over 2,800 free parking spaces (including the parking deck) and seats 400 people in the food court.

Parkway Place is owned by CBL & Associates Properties, Inc.

== History ==
The original Parkway Shopping Center opened in 1957 as an open-air strip mall with; seven stores were added two years later. In 1974 the mall was acquired by Arlen Real Estate (which later became CBL), and a tornado destroyed the south end of the center. In February 1976, the shopping complex reopened as Parkway City Mall, a single-level enclosed mall, with Pizitz (later purchased by McRae's), Montgomery Ward and Parisian as anchors. It offered 467,000 square feet (43,400 m^{2}) of retail space, and was expanded in 1984 and 1994. It was Huntsville's largest shopping center until Madison Square Mall opened in 1984.

Plans began in 1998 to redevelop the location. The mall was losing stores, and, in 2001, the Montgomery Ward chain closed all of its retail stores, one of its three anchors. The demolition of Parkway City Mall and 2002 construction of Parkway Place were completed in stages so as to protect Piccadilly Cafeteria, one of the major remaining businesses at the time of the demolition.

In January 2007, an expansion to the mall began, enlarging the anchor spot used by Parisian as it redeveloped into a Belk store. Parisian was renamed Belk on September 12, 2007.

== Anchor stores ==
- Dillard's 181,028 sq ft (16,818.1 m^{2})
- Belk 188,150 sq ft (17,480 m^{2})

== Former anchors ==
- Parisian (sold to Belk in 2007)
