= Monte Sano State Park =

State park in Huntsville, Alabama, United States

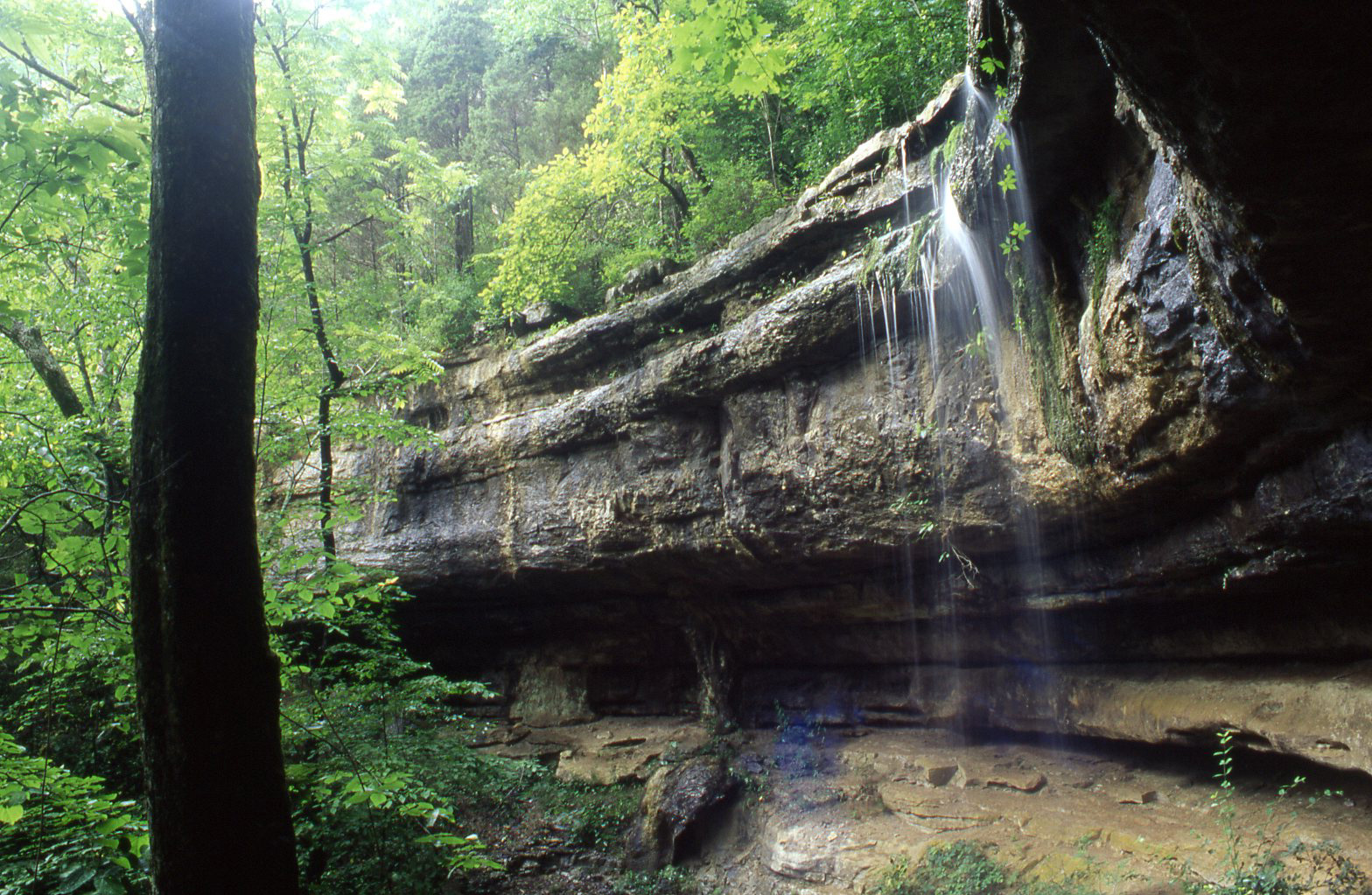
- Dry Falls, Monte Sano State Park

- Location within Alabama
- Location: Huntsville, Alabama, United States
- Coordinates: 34°44′42″N 86°30′41″W
- Area: 2,140 acres (870 ha)
- Elevation: 1,621 ft (494 m)
- Established: 1938
- Administrator: Alabama Department of Conservation and Natural Resources
- Website: Official website

Alabama Register of Landmarks and Heritage
- Designated: June 19, 1996

Monte Sano State Park is a public recreation area and mountaintop retreat encompassing 2,140 acres (870 ha) on the eastern portion of the top and slopes of Monte Sano Mountain on the east side of Huntsville, Alabama. The state park has 1930s-era, Civilian Conservation Corps–built rustic cottages, hiking trails and picnic areas with scenic overlooks, and modern campsites. It is managed by the Alabama Department of Conservation and Natural Resources.

== History ==
The name "Monte Sano" derives from the Spanish for "mountain of health" and is the eponymous name of the mountain that is the main feature of the park. The name reflects the 19th-century tradition of sending diphtheria, cholera and yellow fever sufferers to retreats on the mountain. A week's stay at the Hotel Monte Sano, a three-story Queen Anne–style luxury health resort with 233 rooms that opened in 1877, cost $11 and included amusements like bowling, horseback riding, croquet and lawn tennis. A railway line built to carry patients up the mountain ran from 1888 to 1896 before going bankrupt. Remnants of the line may be seen in the adjoining Monte Sano Nature Preserve operated by the Land Trust of North Alabama. The development of vaccines and treatments ended the era of health trips to the mountain.

Workers with the Civilian Conservation Corps developed the park in the 1930s, constructing an amphitheater, lodge, and rustic cottages built in the Arts and Crafts style. The park officially opened on August 25, 1938. It was added to the Alabama Register of Landmarks and Heritage in 1996.

== Awards ==
In September 2020, Monte Sano State Park was one of eleven Alabama state parks awarded Tripadvisor’s Traveler’s Choice Award, which recognizes businesses and attractions that earn consistently high user reviews.

== Activities and amenities ==
- Overnight stays: The park has 14 cabins constructed in the Arts and Crafts style, with hand-crafted stone fireplaces and original wood flooring. In addition, the campground has modern campsites for RVs and primitive campsites for tents.
- Picnicking: The picnic area overlooks a scenic valley and is adjacent to a modern playground for children.
- Trails: The park features over 20 miles (32 km) of hiking and 14 miles (23 km) of mountain biking trails.
- Astronomy: Von Braun Astronomical Society runs the planetarium and observatory.

== In popular culture ==
The song "c u in da ballpit" by the band Camping in Alaska references the park.

== See also ==
- Parks and Greenways in Huntsville
- List of Hiking Trails in Alabama
