= Memorial Parkway (Huntsville, Alabama) =

Street in Huntsville, Alabama, United States

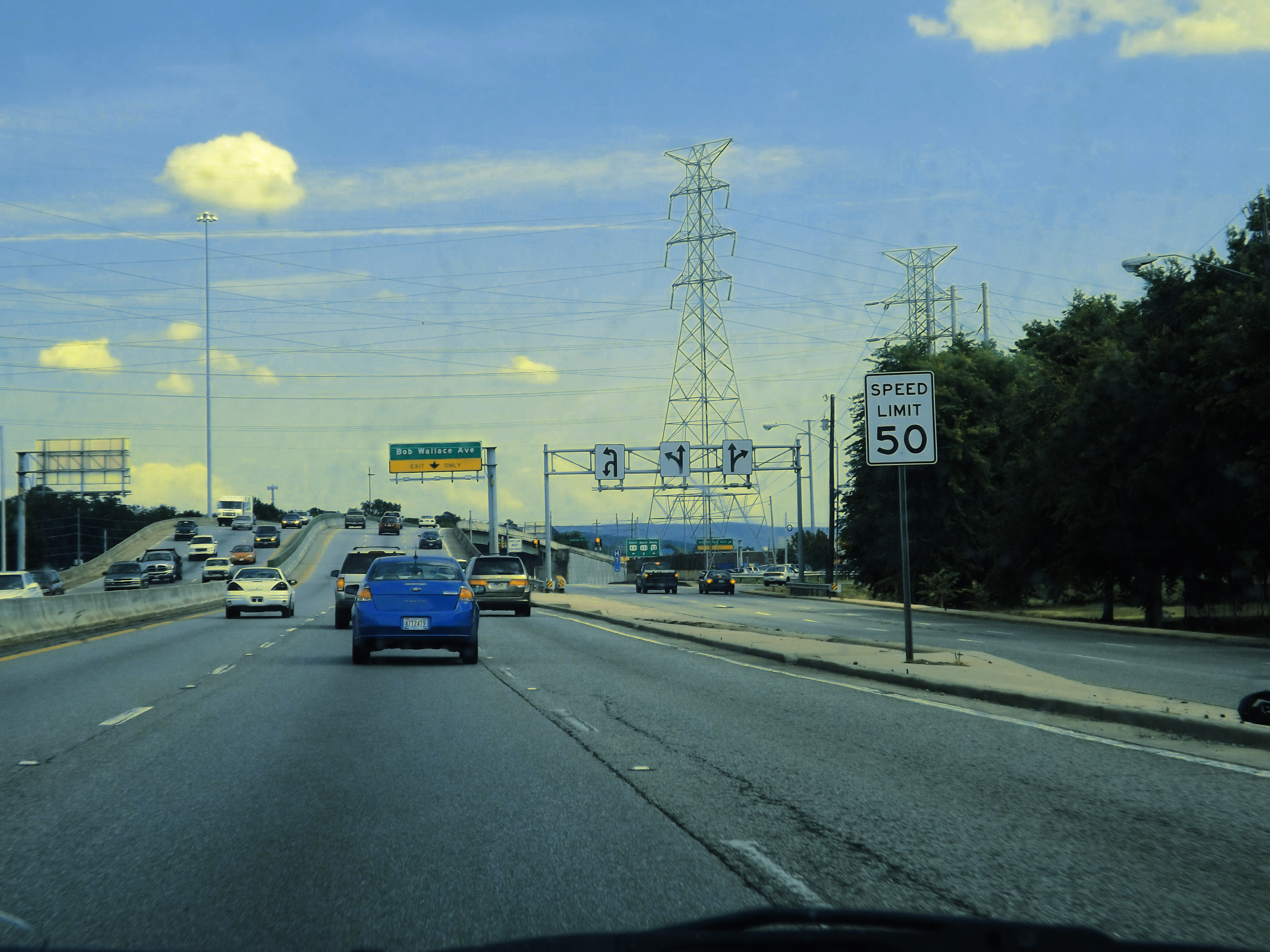
- Memorial Parkway at Governors Drive
- Length: 18.3 mi (29.5 km)
- Location: Huntsville, Alabama
- North end: Bob Wade Lane (continues as US 231/431)
- Major junctions: US 72 East / Sparkman Drive; US 72 West / University Drive; Interstate 565; Alabama 53 / Governors Drive; US 431 / Governors Drive
- South end: Tennessee River (continues as US 231)

Memorial Parkway, also known as the Parkway, is a major thoroughfare in Huntsville, Alabama, that carries over 100,000 vehicles on average a day. It, in whole or in part, follows U.S. Route 231, U.S. Route 431, U.S. Route 72, and State Route 53 through the Huntsville city limits. It is a limited access road through most of Huntsville city proper, providing exits to the frontage road which allows access to road intersections, as well as businesses and residences along the route. Both the limited access and frontage roads are referred to as Memorial Parkway. Originally constructed to bypass downtown Huntsville and officially opened on December 1, 1955, the highway is the major commercial thoroughfare through Huntsville, a status it has held since the mid-1960s.

== General plan and structure ==
The limited access portions of the Parkway contain eight to ten lanes of traffic; in each direction there are two to three lanes of limited-access traffic, paralleled by a two-lane, one-way frontage road. At major intersections, the limited-access lanes overpass the intersecting road with a "camel back" type overpass, while the frontage roads have a signal-controlled intersection with the intersecting road. At each overpass, there is a Texas U-turn configuration – a pair of turn lanes that permit traffic on the frontage roads to make U-turns between the northbound and southbound frontage roads without having to go through the signalized intersection. Generally, in between overpasses, there exists a pair of entrance and exit ramps that allow traffic to transition between the limited-access lanes and the parallel frontage road. Other than at intersections with overpasses, traffic on the frontage road always has the right of way vs. intersecting streets and driveways and there are no other traffic signals. The frontage roads do not exist between the University Drive and Clinton Avenue overpasses; here through traffic must merge into the limited-access lanes.

There are two intersections where the Parkway crosses under the intersecting road, at Martin Road and Interstate 565. At the I-565 interchange, it is possible for Parkway traffic to make a U-turn by executing a sequence of ramp lane changes, although no signage indicates this.

Most of the non-limited access portions within the Huntsville city limits consist of six through lanes, three in each direction, separated by a median. There are no frontage roads on these portions. Most of the portion north of the Mastin Lake Road intersection consists of four lanes, two in each direction.

== Route description ==
From the south, US 231 / Alabama 53 enters Madison County and the city limits of Huntsville over the Tennessee River via the Clement C. Clay Bridge, which is also known as Whitesburg Bridge. From there, the four lane US 231 takes the name of Memorial Parkway and travels north passing Hobbs Island Road where it widens to six lanes.

Memorial Parkway passes to the east of a Sanmina-SCI Corporation production plant, crossing over Green Cove Road. From there, it continues north, passing beside various businesses and farm lands. The Parkway intersects Hobbs Road just south of the first major shopping center of many, the Southeast Plaza Shopping Center. Continuing due north, the Parkway passes Mountain Gap Road and Meadowbrook Drive.

At Meadowbrook Drive, vehicles are directed to exit to access both Whitesburg Drive and Weatherly Road. Just north of Meadowbrook Drive, the southbound lanes separate into a frontage road and a limited-access road, while the northbound lanes remain as one road until just north of Ben Giles Drive. The Parkway has overpasses at Weatherly Road, Whitesburg Drive, Lily Flagg Road and Byrd Spring Road. (Previously existing signals at Charlotte Drive and Boulevard South were removed in July 2016.) The Parkway has an underpass at Martin Road, where the frontage roads intersect at a single point urban interchange. Then a series of overpasses start just north of Martin Road; the first is Golf Road, followed by Airport Road, passing by John Hunt Park.

Following Airport Road, there is a "useless" overpass, as it is referred to by locals since it crosses over no other roadway. This overpass was originally constructed to provide a convenient U-turn as well as allow quicker access to businesses alongside the Parkway. The Parkway continues north with overpasses at Drake and Bob Wallace Avenues, where it passes by Parkway Place Mall. The Parkway then has an overpass over Drake Avenue, Bob Wallace Avenue, and Governors Drive.

At Governors Drive, Alabama 53 splits off and travels west and US 231 begins its overlap with US 431. Just before Clinton Avenue, the frontage roads flow into and out of the ramps of a folded diamond interchange at Clinton Ave. The Parkway then has an overpass at Holmes Avenue, with a full interchange with Interstate 565; this interchange is sometimes referred to as Malfunction Junction. Just north of this interchange, the frontage roads begin again. The Parkway has an overpass at US 72 West/University Drive where an additional overlap with US 72 begins. An overpass at Oakwood Ave leads to a recently constructed overpass over Max Luther Drive and Sparkman Drive, where the overlap with US 72 ends as it splits off to the east. The Parkway continues north with at-grade intersection at Mastin Lake Road, which is planned to have an overpass built by the summer of 2026. Memorial Parkway continues north passing by Alabama A&M University with at-grade intersections at Winchester Road, Meridian Street, and Bob Wade Lane, where the Parkway officially ends and the route continues as US 231/431.

== History ==
US 231 originally ran down through the center of Huntsville following Meridian Street and Whitesburg Drive through Downtown. Memorial Parkway was built as a four-lane highway in the 1950s to bypass downtown. At the time, the only overpass crossed over Holmes Avenue, with ramps providing access from and to the Parkway. In the early 1960s, the overpass was extended to make it also span Clinton Avenue. There were traffic signals at every other major intersection, plus a number of secondary intersections, many of which were eliminated over the years as part of the limited-access construction. With the establishment of the U.S. Army Missile Command at Redstone Arsenal, and the NASA Marshall Space Flight Center in the 1960s, Huntsville underwent massive population growth, and, as a result, traffic increased. State and City leaders started planning to make the Parkway a limited access highway and the second overpass, the "useless" overpass, opened in 1969.

In 1973, the Drake Avenue overpass officially opened, followed by an overpass at Bob Wallace Avenue in 1976. An overpass at Governors Drive opened in 1978. In 1986, the University Drive overpass opened, and in the 1990s, overpasses at Airport Road, Golf Road, and Oakwood Avenue opened making a controlled access highway throughout much of the city.

In 1992, the interchange with I-565 opened. The interchange includes a mix of cloverleaf and fly-over ramps to provide full merge-in and merge-out access to both routes. As part of this construction, the original Clinton and Holmes overpasses were torn down and replaced with wider ones incorporating the necessary merge lanes.

In December 2009, overpasses at Whitesburg Drive and Weatherly Road in South Huntsville opened to the public; and an overpass over Sparkman Drive, Max Luther Drive, and US 72 East opened on April 10, 2012. Prior to 2018, a non-controlled portion of the Parkway remained from the Whitesburg Drive to Martin Road exits, but the construction of new limited-access lanes were completed in 2018, with the previous route becoming frontage roads. As of 2018, the Parkway is fully limited-access from the aforementioned Sparkman Drive exit in the north to just north of Meadowbrook Drive in the south.

== Expansion ==
Memorial Parkway's limited access portion is being expanded to include interchanges and frontage roads at various cross streets along the Parkway. Overpasses are currently planned for the Parkway's intersections with Winchester Road and Mastin Lake Road on the north side, and Hobbs Road, Green Cove Road, and Hobbs Island Road on the south side. Estimated completion dates for significant current Parkway projects are statuses in a quarterly Construction Bulletin from the Alabama Department of Transportation (ALDOT)'s Bureau of Transportation Planning.

The City of Huntsville is planning the construction of a multi-modal bridge to be used by for pedestrians and bicyclist to cross over Memorial Parkway between the interchanges of Holmes Avenue and Governors Drive. This bridge will be a part of the larger Singing River Trail of North Alabama.

=== North side ===
- Walker Lane
- Patterson Lane
- Meridianville Bottom Road
- Winchester Road
- Mastin Lake Road

=== South side ===
- Mountain Gap Road/Hobbs Road
- Green Cove Road
- Hobbs Island Road

== In popular culture ==
- Professional baseball player Jose Canseco earned the nickname "Parkway Jose" while playing with the Huntsville Stars for his ability to hit home runs over the outfield fence at Joe Davis Stadium.

== Intersections ==
The entire route is in Huntsville, Madison County.

mi	km	Destinations	Notes
		Hobbs Island Road	
		Green Cove Road	
		Hobbs Road	Leads to Redstone Arsenal Gate 3
		Redstone Road	
		English Drive	
		Mountain Gap Road	
		Mythewood Drive	
		Meadowbrook Drive	
Begin Controlled Access
		Whitesburg Drive	
		Weatherly Road	Leads to the site of the new Grissom High School
		Lily Flagg Road	Overpass opened August 2018
		Byrd Spring Road	Overpass opened August 2018
		Martin Road	Leads to Redstone Arsenal Gate 1. As of July 2017, the previous temporary ramp configuration and detours have been removed, along with all of the old ramps, and the interchange is in its final configuration, including the only underpass for the controlled access portion of the route. This significantly impacts the Martin Road traffic over the previous configuration that better moved the traffic through that area. Now the Martin Road traffic has to navigate a new signaled intersections which substantially slows the traffic flow over the original cloverleaf design which required no stopping.
		Golf Road	
		Airport Road	Leads to John Hunt Park
		Drake Avenue	Leads to Redstone Arsenal Gate 8, Parkway Place Mall and Brahan Spring Park
		Bob Wallace Avenue	
316.864	509.943	US 431 south (Governors Drive)	Begin overlap with US 431. End overlap with SR 53.
		Clinton Avenue	Access Downtown Huntsville
		I-565	
		US 72 (US-72 West/University Drive)	Begin overlap with US 72
		Oakwood Avenue	
		Max Luther Drive	
		US 72 (US-72 East) and Sparkman Drive	End overlap with US 72
End Controlled Access
		Mastin Lake Road	Will be upgraded to controlled access intersection in 2026
		Winchester Road	
		Bob Wade Lane	
1.000 mi = 1.609 km; 1.000 km = 0.621 mi

=== Exit list ===
Destinations	Notes
Meadowbrook Drive West	Southbound exit only
Whitesburg Drive, Weatherly Road	Also exit for Cameron Road but not signed.
Byrd Spring Road, Lily Flagg Rd, Logan Drive	Opened August 2018, southbound exit provides access to Charlotte Drive
Martin Road	This exit provides direct access to Redstone Arsenal Gate 1. On the southbound side, the directional sign also lists Byrd Spring Road; it is necessary to exit and go through the Martin Road interchange to reach Byrd Spring Road. A secondary sign also notes that this ramp provides access to Vermont Road and Boulevard South, which are not accessible from the northbound lanes. Routing in this area is still being revised due to the construction of the Byrd Spring Road and Lily Flagg road interchanges, and not all signage is in its final configuration. Martin Road is one of the two interchanges where the Parkway crosses under the intersecting road; at all other interchanges other than the I-565 interchange, the Parkway overpasses the intersecting road.
Golf Road	Although the southbound ramp includes signed access to Jones Valley Drive, it is necessary to make a u-turn at Golf Road and continue one-third of a mile northbound to Jones Valley Drive.
Airport Road	The northbound ramp also includes access to Jones Valley Drive.
Drake Avenue	Going northbound, Drake Avenue appears to have two exits because there is a sign that will guide drivers to exit in time for the useless overpass, and another at the appropriate place to exit for Drake Avenue. Both exits lead to the same frontage road. Going southbound, there is an unsigned exit ramp after the Drake Avenue ramp; it also provides access to the useless overpass, and to the entrance to Joe Davis Stadium.
Bob Wallace Avenue
US 431 south / SR 53 north (Governors Drive, SR 1 south) to SR 20 west	North end of SR 53 concurrency; south end of US 431/SR 1 concurrency
Clinton Avenue - Downtown Huntsville	Former SR 20. Although the overpass spans Holmes Avenue, there are no access ramps to or from Holmes.
I-565 (US 72 Alt.)
US 72 west (University Drive, SR 2 west)	South end of US 72/SR 2 concurrency. Going northbound, the ramp for University Drive is incorporated into the I-565 interchange.
Oakwood Avenue, Cook Avenue	Only the northbound ramp includes the Cook Avenue signage; it is not accessible from the southbound side.
US 72 east / Sparkman Drive, Max Luther Drive	North end of US 72/SR 2 concurrency. Opened April 10, 2012

== See also ==
- Madison County, Alabama
- Huntsville-Decatur Combined Statistical Area
- Tennessee Valley
