= Huntsville City Schools =

School district serving Huntsville, Alabama

Address
- 200 White Street Huntsville, Alabama, 35801; United States
- Coordinates: 34°44′02″N 86°34′41″W

District information
- Grades: PK-12
- Superintendent: Dr. Clarence Sutton, Jr.
- Asst. superintendent(s): A.J. Buckner
- Schools: 43
- NCES District ID: 0101800

Students and staff
- Students: 24,083
- Teachers: 1,697
- Staff: 766
- Student–teacher ratio: 13.45

Other information
- Website: huntsvillecityschools.org

Huntsville City Schools is the school district serving Huntsville, Alabama. As of the 2025–26 school year, the system had 23,816 students and employed 2,894 personnel. The district oversees 43 schools: 26 PreK-elementary schools, 11 middle schools, 6 high schools, 1 Virtual School, and 3 magnet schools.

The school system finished the 2010 fiscal year with a debt of nearly $20 million the largest of any school system in Alabama by a significant margin. However, after Casey Wardynski was appointed superintendent, he worked to erase the school system's debt and bring the budget into surplus.

It is partially within Madison County, and partially in Limestone County.

== History ==
In 2014 officials from the school district began monitoring social media activity from students. The officials stated that a phone call from the National Security Agency (NSA) prompted them to do so. In the 2013 fiscal year it paid Chris McRae, a former agent of the Federal Bureau of Investigation (FBI), to run this program.

On April 13th, 2026, Huntsville City Schools achieved unitary status in two areas of its 2015 consent order with the US. Department of Justice. This action released Huntsville City Schools from federal supervision in the areas of Faculty/Staff and Extracurricular Activities.

== Feeder pattern ==
Huntsville City Schools has five feeder patterns. Huntsville City Schools also hosts five schools that fall outside of any feeder pattern.

=== Columbia Feeder Pattern ===
- Columbia High School

- Williams Middle
  - Williams Elementary
  - Providence Elementary

- Morris Middle
  - Morris Elementary
  - Ridgecrest Elementary

=== Grissom Feeder Pattern ===
- Grissom High School

- Challenger Middle
  - Challenger Elementary
  - Farley Elementary

- Mountain Gap Middle
  - Mountain Gap Elementary
  - Weatherly Elementary

- Whitesburg Middle
  - Whitesburg Elementary
  - Chaffee Elementary
  - McDonnel Elementary

=== Huntsville Feeder Pattern ===
- Huntsville High School

- Hampton Cove Middle
  - Hampton Cove Elementary
  - Goldsmith Schiffman Elementary

- Huntsville Junior High
  - Blossomwood Elementary
  - Jones Valley Elementary
  - Monte Sano Elementary
  - Sonnie Hereford

=== Jemison Feeder Pattern ===
- Jemison High School

- McNair Junior High
  - Dawson Elementary
  - Highlands Elementary
  - Lakewood Elementary
  - Rolling Hills Elementary

=== Lee Feeder Pattern ===
- Lee High School

- Chapman Middle
  - Martin Luther King Jr Elementary
  - Montview Elementary

== Elementary schools ==
- Academy for Academics and Arts (magnet)
- Academy for Science and Foreign Language (magnet)
- Blossomwood Elementary
- Chaffee Elementary
- Challenger Elementary
- Dawson Elementary
- Farley Elementary
- GoldSmith Shiffman Elementary
- Hampton Cove Elementary
- Hereford Elementary
- Highlands Elementary
- Jones Valley Elementary
- Lakewood Elementary
- Martin Luther King Jr. Elementary
- McDonnell Elementary
- Monte Sano Elementary
- Montview
- Morris Elementary
- Mountain Gap Elementary
- Providence Elementary
- Ridgecrest Elementary
- Rolling Hills Elementary
- Weatherly Heights Elementary
- Whitesburg Elementary
- Williams Elementary

== Middle schools ==
- Academy for Academics and Arts (magnet)
- Academy for Science and Foreign Language (magnet)
- Challenger Middle
- Chapman Middle
- Hampton Cove Middle
- Huntsville Middle
- McNair Jr. High School
- Mountain Gap Middle
- Whitesburg Middle
- Williams Middle

== High schools ==
- Columbia High School
- Virgil I. Grissom High School
- Huntsville High School
- Jemison High School
- Lee High School
- New Century Technology High School

== Others ==
- Community Intensive Treatment for Youth (C.I.T.Y.) (alternative school)
- Huntsville Center for Technology (vocational school)

== Priority schools ==
The Alabama Department of Education publishes data on schools labeled as "Priority" schools in the state. This is in conjunction with the Alabama Accountability Act. To be labeled "Priority", they must be designated as priority by the state superintendent or receive a D or F on their state report card. The following Huntsville City schools were placed on the state priority list as of the 2024 school year:

- Artemis Virtual Academy
- Jemison High School
- Whitesburg Middle School
- Ronald McNair 7-8

== Former schools ==
- Chapman Elementary School
- J.O. Johnson High School
- S.R. Butler High School
- R.L. Stone Middle School
- Terry Heights Elementary School
- Fletcher E. Seldon Center
- Ed White Middle School
- Davis Hills Middle School

== Board of Education ==
- District 1 - North Huntsville (Currently held by Chaundra Jones)
- District 2 - East Huntsville (Currently held by Holly McCarty, Third Presiding Officer)
- District 3 - South Huntsville (Currently held by Andrea Alvarez)
- District 4 - Downtown Huntsville (Currently held by Ryan Renaud, Vice President)
- District 5 - West Huntsville (Currently held by Carlos Matthews, President)

Officeholders are current as of 4/26/2026

== Revitalization ==
Currently, a major overhaul of the cities school facilities and curriculum is occurring. In 2012, a new digital curriculum was issued, giving all students laptops and increasing digital usage for teaching. This was done to take advantage of the growing use of computers and to help give students easy access to information and organization. In 2011, a $194 million five year capital plan was granted by the Alabama Board of Education to the Huntsville City School System. With this, the city plans to renovate and construct new facilities for many of its aging campuses. These include a new Blossomwood Elementary School, New Freshman Academy for Huntsville High School, construction of a new building and campus for the combination of Lee High School and New Century Technological School, construction of a new Whitesburg Elementary, Virgil I. Grissom High School (the cities largest student body), and J. O. Johnson High School. Renovations and consolidations for many other of the cities schools is also planned. Columbia High School attracted national attention in August 2026 for its football team breaking a 101-game losing streak. It defeated Greensboro High School 41–14.
