= Cummings Research Park =

- CRP
- Location within Huntsville
- Coordinates: 34°43′44″N 86°41′12″W
- Country: United States
- State: Alabama
- Founded: 1962

Area
  - Total: 3,843 acres (1,555 ha)
- Website: https://cummingsresearchpark.com

Cummings Research Park, located primarily in the city of Huntsville, Alabama is the second largest research park in the United States and the fourth largest in the world. It has a mixture of Fortune 500 companies, local and international high-tech enterprises, U.S. space and defense agencies, business incubators and competitive higher-education institutions. CRP is the home of 300 companies, more than 26,000 employees and 13,500 students. The Park's major industries are aerospace, defense, engineering, biotechnology, advanced manufacturing, software development, information technology and cybersecurity.

Cummings Research Park was voted as the Most Outstanding Science Park in the World in 1997 by the Association of University Research Parks. In 2017, it was presented with the Developing Communities of Innovation award.

== History ==
In 1961, Milton K. Cummings, then president of Brown Engineering Company, and Joseph C. Moquin, his later successor, selected a tract of undeveloped land on the western edge of Huntsville for building a new headquarters. Located adjacent to land that had recently been acquired by the University of Alabama for developing a Huntsville Branch and within a few miles of major Army and NASA development centers on Redstone Arsenal, the area was a promising location for a high-technology research park.

Cummings and Moquin, with the support of rocket pioneer Wernher von Braun, proposed that the City of Huntsville zone the area as a research park district. In 1962, the City established this zoning, with 3,000 acres (1,200 ha) of land officially designated Huntsville Research Park.

Brown Engineering (later Teledyne Brown Engineering) was the first to build in the park, opening its campus the inaugural year. As the United States focused on the Space Race, other companies followed. These included large national firms such as Lockheed, Northrop, and IBM, smaller outside firms wanting to open Huntsville operations, and a number of newly organized local enterprises.

In parallel with the growth of industry occupants, the adjacent academic campus also matured; in 1970, this became the University of Alabama in Huntsville (UAH). The UAH Foundation owned a large portion of land in the research park district, and served as a major promoter of development. When Milton Cummings died in 1973, the district was renamed the Cummings Research Park (CRP). By the end of the 1970s, the development of what is now known as CRP East was nearing completion.

In 1982, the second major phase of CRP was launched with the planned development of CRP West. A substantial new parcel of land, exceeding 800 acres (320 ha), was purchased and a master plan was established by the City of Huntsville. This new phase strengthened the development restrictions on the park, rivaling, and in many instances exceeding, the quality of planned research and development parks anywhere in the world. The City of Huntsville has continued to acquire land for future growth of CRP, and it is now 3,843 acres (1,555 ha).

In 2007, a retail and hospitality destination was added to the park. Bridge Street Towne Center is home to many restaurants, shops, three hotels, a movie theater and a 240-apartment development.

In 2015 and 2016, CRP underwent a comprehensive master planning process.

In 2020, Blue Origin opened a 400,000-square-foot rocket engine manufacturing facility in the western portion of Cummings Research Park. Clayco served as general contractor and LJC Design & Engineering as lead design firm on the design-build project, which was completed in ten months. The facility manufactures the BE-4 engine used by Blue Origin's New Glenn rocket and United Launch Alliance's Vulcan Centaur. Engineering News-Record named the facility its 2020 Best of the Best Project in the manufacturing category.
