= Monte Sano Mountain =

Mountain in Huntsville, Alabama, United States

- Location within Alabama

Highest point
- Elevation: 1,654 ft (504 m)
- Coordinates: 34°44′42″N 86°30′42″W

Geography
- Location: Huntsville, Alabama., U.S.
- Topo map: USGS Huntsville

Monte Sano Mountain is a mountain located in Huntsville, Alabama. The name Monte Sano is Spanish for "Mountain of health". The mountain was given its name by Dr. Thomas Fern, who along with his two brothers, founded a small colony on the mountain during an epidemic of yellow fever, malaria, and cholera. The location on the mountain was chosen because of its cool air and medicinal springs.

The top is relatively flat and lies just over 500 meters above sea level. This elevation is about 300 meters higher than the floor of the Tennessee Valley, which surrounds it. A residential neighborhood occupies the western portion of the top. The eastern portion and slopes of the mountain are occupied by Monte Sano State Park. Monte Sano is connected to Round Top (Burritt) Mountain by a col to the south.

== Hotel Monte Sano & Railway ==
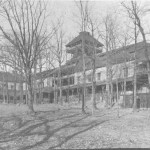
Hotel Monte Sano

The summer months in the late 1800s saw yellow fever, cholera and diphtheria in high proportions. Clean water and sanitary living conditions were found on the mountain and visitors' health improved. However, because the causes of these diseases were not yet fully understood, many again would become ill after returning home.

In 1886, the Hotel Monte Sano was built to serve as a health resort for hundreds of people. The hotel was a three-story 223 room wooden structure of Queen Anne architecture, with rooms costing $11.00 per week, including meals. Resort amusements included horseback riding, two bowling alleys, croquet, billiards, lawn tennis, and beautiful gardens. Patrons traveled the eight miles from the Huntsville Depot to the hotel in four hours by horse and carriage.

The popular resort's register showed guests from every state in the union and several foreign countries. Visitors included philanthropist William H. Vanderbilt, Viscount William Waldorf Astor, composer Walter Damrosch, and railroad financier Jay Gould. To better serve guests, the eight-mile Monte Sano Railway was created between May and August 1888. The 25 cent train ride took 20 minutes and made three trips per day. However, shortly after completion, the train's brake sand pipes choked, the wheels jumped the rails, and the train came to a quick stop. There was no injury to passengers or damage to the train, but the incident frightened potential riders. Thereafter, the railway was primarily used for hauling supplies until it went into bankruptcy in 1896.

Once the cause and cure for yellow fever and cholera were discovered, a trip to the "Mountain of Health" was no longer necessary. Transportation problems and lack of patrons stifled business to the hotel, and its last season was 1900.

== Geology ==
A view of South Huntsville from atop Monte Sano Mountain

Geologically, Monte Sano is a mesa separated from the main Cumberland Plateau by the Flint River Valley. It is characterized by a resistant sandstone caprock of the Pennsylvanian Pottsville Formation overlying more soluble layers of Mississippian limestone. The Mississippian limestone is rich in marine fossils, especially crinoids and blastoids.

=== Western Slope ===
Much of the western slope of the mountain - the backdrop for downtown Huntsville and 2 miles from City Hall - comprises the Monte Sano Nature Preserve owned and managed by the Land Trust of North Alabama. Established in 1987 as Alabama's first land trust, the Land Trust of North Alabama is an accredited not-for-profit organization dedicated to preserving land, fresh water resources, local farms, and habitat.

The Monte Sano Nature Preserve is one of the largest urban nature preserves in the US and one of six nature preserves in the area maintained by the Land Trust of North Alabama. The Monte Sano Nature Preserve consists of over 1,107 acres and offers 23+ miles of public trails. The extensive trail system, along with those of the Land Trust's Wade mountain, Harvest Square, and Blevins Gap Nature Preserve, were the first to be honored as National Recreation Trails in Madison County.

Along with the Land Trust, volunteers have crafted and maintained the trails. Land Trust trails include Three Caves Loop, Bluff Line, Toll Gate, Alms House, Fagan Springs, Oak Park, and Old Railroad Bed trails. The Old Railroad Bed Trail preserves what is left of the path of the steam locomotive that traveled from the Huntsville Depot to the (no longer standing) Hotel Monte Sano from 1888 to 1896. This trail is one of the first 500 Rails to Trails.
