= List of trails in Alabama =

This is a list of trails in the U.S. state of Alabama.

== By county ==
=== Autauga County ===
- Autauga Creek Trail, 0.5 miles (0.80 km); Prattville
- Wilderness Park Trail (a.k.a. Bamboo Park), 0.33 miles (0.53 km); Prattville
- Cooter's Pond Park Riverwalk, 1 mile (1.6 km); Prattville
- Jones Bluff Park (aka Bob Woodruff Park) Trail; (Selma address)
- Jasmine Trail Park, 0.3 miles (0.48 km); Prattville
- Overlook Memorial Park Walking Path, 1 mile (1.6 km); Prattville
- Pratt Park Walking Trail, 1 mile (1.6 km); Prattville
- Springhill Park Trail, 0.2 miles (0.32 km); Prattville
- Swift Creek Park Trail, Autaugaville
- Upper Kingston Park Walking Trail, 0.7 miles (1.1 km); Prattville
- YMCA - Don M. Smith Branch Trail, 1 mile (1.6 km); Prattville
- YMCA - Willis Bradford Branch Trail, 1 mile (1.6 km); Prattville

=== Baldwin County ===
- Bartram Canoe Trail, 200 miles (320 km); Mobile–Tensaw River Delta in the area of Mobile
- Bay Minette Walking Trail, 1.7 miles (2.7 km); Bay Minette
- Bon Secour National Wildlife Refuge Trails, 6 miles (9.7 km); Gulf Shores
  - Centennial Trail, 2 miles (3.2 km)
  - Gator Lake Trail, 1 mile (1.6 km)
  - Jeff Friend Trail, 1 mile (1.6 km)
  - Pine Beach Trail, 2 miles (3.2 km)
- City of Foley Antique Rose Trail, 1 mile (1.6 km); Foley
- Eastern Shore Trail, 24.7 miles (39.8 km); Spanish Fort to Weeks Bay
- The Forever Wild Lillian Swamp Complex Nature Preserve and Recreational Area Trail(s); Lillian
- The Forever Wild Splinter Hill Bog Nature Preserve and Recreational Area Trail, 4 miles (6.4 km); Perdido
- Fort Morgan Road Trail, 5.7 miles (9.2 km); Gulf Shores
- Gulf State Park Trails, over 28.0 miles (45.1 km); Gulf Shores
  - Alligator Marsh, 0.4 miles (0.64 km)
  - Armadillo Trail, 0.7 miles (1.1 km)
  - Beach Mouse Bypass, 1.1 miles (1.8 km)
  - Bear Creek Trail, 0.4 miles (0.64 km)
  - Bobcat Branch, 0.7 miles (1.1 km)
  - Bobcat Bypass, 0.1 miles (0.16 km)
  - Campground Connector, 0.1 miles (0.16 km)
  - Campground Trail, 2.2 miles (3.5 km)
  - Canal Trail, 1 mile (1.6 km)
  - Cross Park Trail, 0.8 miles (1.3 km)
  - Eagle Connector, 0.2 miles (0.32 km)
  - Eagle Loop, 0.3 miles (0.48 km)
  - East Cabin Connector, 0.2 miles (0.32 km)
  - Gopher Tortoise Trail, 1.5 miles (2.4 km)
  - Lake Crossing, 0.6 miles (0.97 km)
  - Lake Shelby Overlook, 0.3 miles (0.48 km)
  - Lakeview Trail, 2.2 miles (3.5 km)
  - Middle Lake Overlook, 0.1 miles (0.16 km)
  - Sawgrass Trail, 0.5 miles (0.80 km)
  - West Cabin Connector, 0.2 miles (0.32 km)
  - Woodside Connector, 0.1 miles (0.16 km)
  - Hugh S. Banyon Backcountry Trail Complex, 13.4 miles (21.6 km); Gulf Shores and Orange Beach
    - Catman Trail, 2.7 miles (4.3 km)
    - Cotton Bayou, 1.1 miles (1.8 km)
    - Coyote Crossing, 2.1 miles (3.4 km)
    - Gulf Oak Ridge, 3 miles (4.8 km)
    - Rattlesnake Ridge, 1.6 miles (2.6 km)
    - Rosemary Dunes, 2.1 miles (3.4 km)
    - Twin Bridges, 0.8 miles (1.3 km)
- Historic Blakeley State Park Trails, 16 miles (26 km); Blakeley
  - Beaver Pond Trail
  - Benjamin Randall Trail
  - Breastworks Trail
  - Champion Tree Trail
  - E.O. Wilson Boardwalk
  - Forever Wild Trail
  - General Cockrell's Loop
  - General Garrard Trail
  - General Liddell's Trail
  - Hallet's Trail
  - Hiding Tree Boardwalk
  - Jackson Springs Trail
  - Jaque Pate Trail
  - John Fowler Trail
  - Mott Trail
  - Old Apalachee Trail
  - Shell Midden Trail
  - Siege Line Trail
  - Squirrel's Nest Trail
  - Stebbins Trail
  - Taitt Trail
  - Toulmin Trail
  - Union Battery Loop Trail
  - Warren Ross Dodge Trail
- Live Oak Landing Tensaw River Recreational Area Trails; Stockton
- Loxley Park Walking Trail, 0.5 miles (0.80 km); Loxley
- Mound Island Canoe Trail, 1.4 miles (2.3 km); Stockton
- Perdido River Wildlife Management Area Hiking Trail, 17.9 miles (28.8 km); Robertsdale
- Pioneer Park Walking Trail, 1.0 mile (1.6 km); Summerdale
- Redoubt Trail Loop, 6.1 miles (9.8 km); Spanish Fort
- Robertsdale Trail (a.k.a. Central Baldwin Rail-Trail), 2 miles (3.2 km); Robertsdale
- South Beach Park Trail, 0.25 miles (0.40 km); Fairhope
- Waterfront Park Trail, 0.5 miles (0.80 km); Orange Beach
- Weeks Bay National Estuarine Research Reserve Visitor Center and Nature Trails; Fairhope

=== Barbour County ===
- Eufaula National Wildlife Refuge Trails, 2.52 miles (4.06 km); Eufaula
  - Artesian Well Trail, 1.21 miles (1.95 km)
  - Bradley Dike Cutoff Trail, 0.83 miles (1.34 km)
  - Nature Trail, 0.48 miles (0.77 km)
- Blue Springs State Park Trails, 2.7 miles (4.3 km); Clio
  - Magnolia Trail, 2.1 miles (3.4 km)
  - White Connector, 0.3 miles (0.48 km)
  - Yellow Connector, 0.3 miles (0.48 km)
- Lakepoint State Park Trails, 5 miles (8.0 km) over 7 trails; Eufaula
- Old Town Creek Trail; Eufaula
- Reed Avenue Area Walking Trail, 0.25 miles (0.40 km); Clayton
- White Oak Creek Campground Trail; Eufaula
- Yoholo-Micco Trail, 3.2 miles (5.1 km); Eufaula

=== Bibb County ===
- Brierfield Ironworks Trail, 3 miles (4.8 km); Brierfield
- Cahaba River National Wildlife Refuge Trails, 6.5 miles (10.5 km); West Blocton
  - Loblolly Trail, 0.74 miles (1.19 km)
  - NE Cahaba Trail, 1 mile (1.6 km)
  - Old Refuge Road, 0.47 miles (0.76 km)
  - Overlook Trail, 0.89 miles (1.43 km)
  - Piper Interpretive Trail, 2.5 miles (4.0 km)
  - River Road Trail, 2.03 miles (3.27 km)
- Tannehill Ironworks Historical State Park Trails, 3 miles (4.8 km); McCalla
  - Furnace Trail
  - Grist Mill Trail, 0.7 miles (1.1 km)
  - Iron Haul Road Extension, 0.5 miles (0.80 km)
  - Iron Haul Road, 1.5 miles (2.4 km)
  - Old Bucksville Stage Road, 1 mile (1.6 km)
  - Slave Quarters Trail, 1 mile (1.6 km)
  - Tramway Trail, 0.8 miles (1.3 km)
  - Tri-County Trail
- Woodstock Walking Trail, 0.125 miles (0.201 km); Woodstock

=== Blount County ===
- Palisades Park Nature Trails, over 2 miles (3.2 km); Oneonta
  - Bird's Foot Trail, 0.18 miles (0.29 km)
  - Dogwood Trail #1, 0.11 miles (0.18 km)
  - Dogwood Trail #2, 0.10 miles (0.16 km)
  - Old Road Trail, 0.09 miles (0.14 km)
  - Pine Trail, 0.10 miles (0.16 km)
  - Rockledge Trail, 0.09 miles (0.14 km)
  - Rocky Trail, 0.92 miles (1.48 km)
  - Trail of Trees, 0.16 miles (0.26 km)
  - Well Trail, 0.09 miles (0.14 km)
- Rickwood Caverns State Park Trails, 3 miles (4.8 km); Warrior
  - Fitness Loop, 0.4 miles (0.64 km)
  - Fossil Mountain Hiking Trail, 1.25 miles (2.01 km)
  - Moss Rock Connector Trail, 0.5 miles (0.80 km)
  - Picnic Loop Trail, 0.8 miles (1.3 km)
- Swann Bridge Trail, 3.2 miles (5.1 km); Cleveland

=== Bullock County ===
- The Forever Wild Wehle Land Conservation Center Trail System, 12.6 miles (20.3 km); Midway
  - Blue Heron Lake Dam Connector
  - Bottomland Cut-off Trail, 1 mile (1.6 km)
  - Firebreak Trail, 3.6 miles (5.8 km)
  - Forever Wild Grove Loop
  - Forever Wild Quail Ridge Loop
  - Pines Trail, 5.7 miles (9.2 km)

=== Butler County ===
- Sherling Lake Park Trail; Greenville

=== Calhoun County ===
- Chief Ladiga Trail, 33 miles (53 km); Anniston and Esom Hill
- Dugger Mountain, 6.8 miles (10.9 km); Piedmont
- The Forever Wild Coldwater Mountain Doug Ghee Nature Preserve and Recreational Area Trail System, 40 miles (64 km); Anniston
- Genes Loop Trail, 6 miles (9.7 km); Joseph Springs
- Mountain Longleaf National Wildlife Refuge Trails, 18 miles (29 km); Anniston
  - Alisha Lane, 0.82 miles (1.32 km)
  - Bailey Trail, 0.19 miles (0.31 km)
  - Bar S Road, 0.69 miles (1.11 km)
  - Bentbow Road, 1.22 miles (1.96 km)
  - Boundary Road, 2.84 miles (4.57 km)
  - Boundary Road Trail, 0.89 miles (1.43 km)
  - Bow String Road, 0.07 miles (0.11 km)
  - Briarwood Trail, 0.14 miles (0.23 km)
  - Collin Road, 0.95 miles (1.53 km)
  - Contour Road, 0.8 miles (1.3 km)
  - Crooked Road, 0.44 miles (0.71 km)
  - Davis Mountain Road, 0.66 miles (1.06 km)
  - Longleaf Trail, 0.51 miles (0.82 km)
  - Morton Mountain Road, 0.45 miles (0.72 km)
  - Mountain Top Trail, 0.59 miles (0.95 km)
  - North Fork Road, 0.79 miles (1.27 km)
  - Silver Ridge Road, 2.29 miles (3.69 km)
  - Smokey Mountain Loop, 2.9 miles (4.7 km)
  - South Fork Road, 0.68 miles (1.09 km)
  - Thornberry Trail, 0.33 miles (0.53 km)

=== Chambers County ===
- Amity Campground and Rocky Point Recreation Area Trails, 1.5 miles (2.4 km); Lanett
  - Alligator Creek Trail, 0.6 miles (0.97 km)
  - Beaver Lodge Trails, 0.9 miles (1.4 km)
- Chattahoochee Valley Railroad Trail, 7.5 miles (12.1 km); Valley

=== Cherokee County ===
- Cherokee Rock Village Diamond Trail System, 7.9 miles (12.7 km); Leesburg
  - Blue Trail, 2.0 miles (3.2 km)
  - Green Trail, 0.7 miles (1.1 km)
  - Red Trail, 3.4 miles (5.5 km)
  - Tag (Orange) Trail, 1.5 miles (2.4 km)
- Little River Canyon National Preserve Trails, 23.6 miles (38.0 km); Fort Payne
  - Beaver Pond Trail, 1.5 miles (2.4 km)
  - Bridge Trail, 0.75 miles (1.21 km)
  - Canyon Mouth Trail, 1 mile (1.6 km)
  - DeSoto Scout Trail, 16 miles (26 km) (Also traverses through Little River Canyon Wildlife Management Area and DeSoto State Park.)
  - Eberhart Trail, 0.75 miles (1.21 km)
  - Little Falls Trail, 0.75 miles (1.21 km)
  - Lower Two-Mile Trail, 0.1 miles (0.16 km)
  - Path To Learning Trail, 0.5 miles (0.80 km)
  - Powell Trail, 0.75 miles (1.21 km)
  - YCC Loop Trail, 3.75 miles (6.04 km)
- Little River Canyon Wildlife Management Area Trails, 20.9 miles (33.6 km); Fort Payne
  - Road 1, 1.8 miles (2.9 km)
  - Road 2, 3 miles (4.8 km)
  - Road 3 (Hartline Ford), 1.8 miles (2.9 km)
  - Road 4 (Billy's Ford), 0.5 miles (0.80 km)
  - Road 5, 7.6 miles (12.2 km)
  - Road 6, 0.5 miles (0.80 km)
  - Road 7, 1 mile (1.6 km)
  - Road 8, 2 miles (3.2 km)
  - Road 9, 1.7 miles (2.7 km)
  - Road 10, 0.8 miles (1.3 km)
  - Road 11, 0.2 miles (0.32 km)

=== Chilton County ===
- Confederate Memorial Park Loop, 1.3 miles (2.1 km); (Marbury address)
- Maddox Horse Camp, 20 miles (32 km); Brent
- Maplesville Town Park Trail, 0.5 miles (0.80 km) with two wooden pedestrian bridges; Maplesville
- Minooka Park Trail System, 25.0 miles (40.2 km); Jemison
- The Sullivans at Evergreen; Thorsby
- Town Park Walking Trail, 0.5 miles (0.80 km); Jemison

=== Choctaw County ===
- Butler Multi-Use Trail, 0.5 miles (0.80 km); Butler
- Choctaw National Wildlife Refuge Observation Platform Trail, 0.2 miles (0.32 km); Gilbertown
- Pennington Walking Trail, 0.5 miles (0.80 km); Pennington
- Service Park Trail; Silas

=== Clarke County ===
- Silver Creek Park's Laurel Falls Trail, 0.6 miles (0.97 km); Whatley

=== Clay County ===
- Ashland Trail, 0.5 miles (0.80 km); Ashland
- Cheaha State Park Trails, over 10.5 miles (16.9 km); Delta
  - Bald Rock Boardwalk, 0.3 miles (0.48 km)
  - Bald Rock Trail, 0.5 miles (0.80 km)
  - Cave Creek Trail, 12 miles (19 km)
  - Cheaha Express, 2.4 miles (3.9 km)
  - Cheaha Run, 0.4 miles (0.64 km)
  - Deer Run, 1.2 miles (1.9 km)
  - Fisherman's Trail, 0.6 miles (0.97 km)
  - Lake Trail, 1 mile (1.6 km)
  - Leave No Trace Bigfoot Trail, 0.5 miles (0.80 km)
  - Lower Spring Trail, 0.7 miles (1.1 km)
  - Mountain Laurel Trail, 1.4 miles (2.3 km)
  - Pulpit Rock Trail, 0.3 miles (0.48 km)
  - Upper Spring Trail, 1.2 miles (1.9 km)
- Odum Scout Trail, 9.8 miles (15.8 km); Lineville

=== Cleburne County ===
- Cheaha State Park Trails, 10.5 miles (16.9 km); Delta
  - Bald Rock Boardwalk, 0.3 miles (0.48 km)
  - Bald Rock Trail, 0.5 miles (0.80 km)
  - Cheaha Express, 2.4 miles (3.9 km)
  - Cheaha Run, 0.4 miles (0.64 km)
  - Deer Run, 1.2 miles (1.9 km)
  - Fisherman's Trail, 0.6 miles (0.97 km)
  - Lake Trail, 1 mile (1.6 km)
  - LNT Bigfoot Trail, 0.5 miles (0.80 km)
  - Lower Spring Trail, 0.7 miles (1.1 km)
  - Mountain Laurel Trail, 1.4 miles (2.3 km)
  - Pulpit Rock Trail, 0.3 miles (0.48 km)
  - Upper Spring Trail, 1.2 miles (1.9 km)
- Chief Ladiga Trail, 33 miles (53 km); Anniston and Esom Hill
- Coleman Lake Loop, 1.9 miles (3.1 km); Fruithurst
- Pleasant Grove Community Walking Trail, 0.25 miles (0.40 km); Delta
- Ranburne Recreational Trail, 0.5 miles (0.80 km); Ranburne

=== Coffee County ===
- Enterprise Recreational Trail, 1.3 miles (2.1 km); Enterprise
- Heflin Smith's Sports Complex, 0.6 miles (0.97 km); Kinston
- Major James E. Grimes Riverwalk Trail, 2.1 miles (3.4 km); Elba

=== Colbert County ===
- Cane Creek Canyon Nature Preserve, 9.1 miles (14.6 km); Tuscumbia
- The Forever Wild Freedom Hills Trail System, 14.7 miles (23.7 km); Barton
  - Blue Hole Road Loop, 2.2 miles (3.5 km)
  - Bugg Mill Hollow Loop, 6.5 miles (10.5 km)
  - McCaig Hollow Loop, 3.8 miles (6.1 km)
  - Mills Ridge Loop, 2.2 miles (3.5 km)
  - Walking Trail
- Muscle Shoals Sportsplex Trail, 0.6 miles (0.97 km); Muscle Shoals
- Sacred Tears Trail; Tuscumbia
- TVA Muscle Shoals Reservation Trails, 17 miles (27 km); Florence, Muscle Shoals, and Sheffield
  - Bicycle Trail, 1.48 miles (2.38 km); Muscle Shoals and Florence
  - CCC Pavilion Trail
  - Energy Trail, 1.05 miles (1.69 km); Muscle Shoals
  - Gunnery Fitness Trail, 0.028 miles (0.045 km); Muscle Shoals
  - Jogging Trail, 3.1 miles (5.0 km); Muscle Shoals
  - Low Shore Trail, 0.17 miles (0.27 km); Sheffield
  - Native Plant Garden Trail, 0.31 miles (0.50 km); Sheffield
  - Old First Quarters Trail Trail, 0.18 miles (0.29 km); Muscle Shoals
  - Old Fitness Trail
  - Old Railroad Bridge Trail, 0.18 miles (0.29 km); Muscle Shoals and Florence
  - Reservation Road Trail, 2.6 miles (4.2 km); Muscle Shoals and Sheffield
  - River Heritage Park Trail, 1.42 miles (2.29 km); Florence
  - Rockpile Trail, 2.67 miles (4.30 km); Muscle Shoals
  - Southport Historical Trail, 1.29 miles (2.08 km); Muscle Shoals
  - Waterfall Walk, 0.18 miles (0.29 km); Muscle Shoals

=== Conecuh County ===
N/A

=== Coosa County ===
- Alabama Scenic River Trail, more than 631 miles (1,015 km), water trail
- Coosa Wildlife Management Area Coosa Trail, 11.41 miles (18.36 km); Rockford
- Flagg Mountain Trail System, 4 miles (6.4 km); Clanton
  - Pink (Magenta) Trail
  - White Trail
  - Yellow Trail
- Pinhoti Trail, 335 miles (539 km); Weogufka

=== Covington County ===
- Conecuh National Forest Trails, 20 miles (32 km); Beda
  - Conecuh Trail North Loop, 12 miles (19 km)
  - Conecuh Trail South Loop, 8 miles (13 km)
  - Five Runs Loop Trail, 5.4 miles (8.7 km); Wing
  - Lake Shore Trail, 2 miles (3.2 km); Wing
  - Open Pond Trail, 2.1 miles (3.4 km); Wing
- Florala City Park Trail, 1.4 miles (2.3 km); Florala
- Frank Jackson State Park, 6 miles (9.7 km); Opp
  - Azalea Trail
  - Dogwood Trail
  - Honeysuckle Trail
  - Magnolia Trail
  - Seth Hammett Walkway
  - Walking Trail
- Lurleen B. Wallace Community College Trail, 1.75 miles (2.82 km); Andalusia
- Solon Dixon Forestry Education Center Trails; Andalusia

=== Crenshaw County ===
- Petrey Recreational Trail, 0.25 miles (0.40 km); Petrey

=== Cullman County ===
- Ave Maria Grotto Trail, 1 mile (1.6 km); Cullman
- Good Hope Recreational Trail, 0.4 miles (0.64 km); Good Hope
- Holly Pond Multipurpose Trail, 0.25 miles (0.40 km); Holly Pond
- Hurricane Creek Park, 8 miles (13 km); Cullman
- Smith Lake Park Walking/Bike Trails, 3.5 miles (5.6 km)
- Sportsman Lake Mountain Bicycle Trail, 5 miles (8.0 km); Cullman
- Stony Lonesome OHV; Bremen
- Veteran's Park Walking Trail, 0.5 miles (0.80 km); Hanceville
- Vivian T. Allen Park Trail, 0.2 miles (0.32 km); Colony
- West Point Recreational Trail, 0.3 miles (0.48 km); West Point
- Wilborn ATV Trail, 110 miles (180 km); Hanceville
- Duck River Reservoir, 21 miles (34 km); Berlin

=== Dale County ===
- Beaver Lake Trail, 1.7 miles (2.7 km); Fort Novosel
- Ozark Pedestrian Trail, 3.1 miles (5.0 km); Ozark

=== Dallas County ===
- The Forever Wild Old Cahawba Prairie Tract Trail System, 14.1 miles (22.7 km); Orrville
  - Cahawba Trail, 6.3 miles (10.1 km)
  - Federal Trail, 3.7 miles (6.0 km)
  - Indian Trail, 1.6 miles (2.6 km)
  - Old Cahawba Rail Trail, 2.5 miles (4.0 km)
- Old Cahawba Archaeological Park; Orrville
  - Burial Grounds Trail, .27 miles (0.43 km)
  - Clear Creek Nature Trail, .5 miles (0.80 km)
- Paul M. Grist State Park Trails, 20 miles (32 km); Selma
- Six Mile Creek Park Trail; Selma

=== DeKalb County ===
- Buck's Pocket State Park Trails, 15 miles (24 km); Grove Oak
  - High Bluff Trail, 0.5 miles (0.80 km)
  - Indian House Trail, 0.5 miles (0.80 km)
  - Point Rock Trail, 2 miles (3.2 km)
  - Primitive Campground Trail, 2.5 miles (4.0 km)
  - South Sauty Creek Trail, 2.5 miles (4.0 km)
- DeSoto State Park Trails, 31.5 miles (50.7 km); Fort Payne
  - Aqua Loop Trail, 0.5 miles (0.80 km)
  - Blue Trail, 1.7 miles (2.7 km)
  - CCC Road, 1.7 miles (2.7 km)
  - Chalet Trail, 0.7 miles (1.1 km)
  - DeSoto Scout/Yellow Trail, 6 miles (9.7 km)
  - Exit 1, 0.3 miles (0.48 km)
  - Exit 2, 0.4 miles (0.64 km)
  - Exit 3, 0.5 miles (0.80 km)
  - Family Bike Loop, 1.9 miles (3.1 km)
  - Gilliam Loop, 3.2 miles (5.1 km)
  - Green Trail, 1.1 miles (1.8 km)
  - Knotty Pine MTB Trail, 1.1 miles (1.8 km)
  - Never Neverland Bypass, 0.3 miles (0.48 km)
  - Never Neverland MTB Trail, 2.9 miles (4.7 km)
  - Old Silver Trail, 0.3 miles (0.48 km)
  - Orange Silver Connector, 0.3 miles (0.48 km)
  - Orange Trail, 1.8 miles (2.9 km)
  - Quarry-Nothing Bypass, 0.3 miles (0.48 km)
  - Red Trail, 1.2 miles (1.9 km)
  - Silver Trail, 1.7 miles (2.7 km)
  - The Knob Exit, 0.3 miles (0.48 km)
  - Violet Trail, 0.3 miles (0.48 km)
  - Vizzney Land, 1 mile (1.6 km)
  - White Trail, 2 miles (3.2 km)
- Fyffe Recreational Trail, 0.4 miles (0.64 km); Fyffe
- Hammondville Park Trail, 0.25 miles (0.40 km); Hammondville
- Ider Town Park Trail, 0.25 miles (0.40 km); Ider
- Powell Town Park Trail, 0.25 miles (0.40 km); Powell
- Rhododendron Trail, 1.3 miles (2.1 km); Mentone

=== Elmore County ===
- Alabama Nature Center Trails, 5 miles (8.0 km); Millbrook
  - Hilltop Pass, 1 mile (1.6 km)
  - Still Creek Run, 2 miles (3.2 km)
  - Turkey Ridge, 2 miles (3.2 km)
- Corn Creek Nature Trail, 1 mile (1.6 km); Wetumpka
- Fort Toulouse-Fort Jackson Park, 2 miles (3.2 km); Wetumpka
  - Bartram Nature Trail, 2 miles (3.2 km)
- Harvest Fields Community Church Walking Trail, 1.1 miles (1.8 km); Deatsville
- The Forever Wild Gothard-AWF Yates Lake Wildlife Management Area Trail System, 7.4 miles (11.9 km); (Dadeville address)
  - John B. Scott Forever Wild Trail, 4.7 miles (7.6 km)
  - Cherokee Bluffs Dam Railroad (Highline) Trail, 0.44 miles (0.71 km)
  - Cherokee Bluffs Dam Railroad (Lowline) Trail, 2.7 miles (4.3 km)
- Gold Star Park Walking Trail, 0.75 miles (1.21 km); Wetumpka
- Legacy Park Walking Trail, 0.5 miles (0.80 km); Millbrook
- Mill Creek Sports Complex Walking Trail, 0.5 miles (0.80 km); Millbrook
- Minnie Massey Park Walking Trail, 0.25 miles (0.40 km); Millbrook
- Panther Palace Walking Trail, 0.5 miles (0.80 km); Eclectic
- Swayback Bridge Trail, 12 miles (19 km); Wetumpka
- Village Green Walking Trail, 0.25 miles (0.40 km); Millbrook

=== Escambia County ===
- Houston Avery Park, 0.5 miles (0.80 km); Atmore
- Little River State Forest & Claude D. Kelley Recreational Area Trails, 4.7 miles (7.6 km); Atmore
  - Bell-CCC Loop, 1.5 miles (2.4 km)
  - Gazebo Trail, 3.2 miles (5.1 km)
- Magnolia Branch Wildlife Reserve, 17 miles (27 km); Atmore
- Tom Byrne Park, 0.5 miles (0.80 km); Atmore

=== Etowah County ===
- Hokes Bluff Walking Trail, 0.25 miles (0.40 km); Hokes Bluff
- Martin Wildlife Park Trail, 2.9 miles (4.7 km); Gadsden
- Noccalula Falls Park Trails, 6.6 miles (10.6 km); Gadsden
  - Black Creek Bend, 0.7 miles (1.1 km)
  - Black Creek Trail, 1.7 miles (2.7 km)
  - Cascade Trail, 0.6 miles (0.97 km)
  - Family Loop, 0.6 miles (0.97 km)
  - Jeep Hill Connector, 0.3 miles (0.48 km)
  - Jeep Hill Loop, 1 mile (1.6 km)
  - Moonshine Ridge, 0.7 miles (1.1 km)
  - Whatley Trail, 1 mile (1.6 km)
- Sardis Recreational Trail, 0.5 miles (0.80 km); Sardis City
- Sumatanga Mountain Loop, 4 miles (6.4 km); Gallant

=== Fayette County ===
- Berry Walking Trail, 0.25 miles (0.40 km); Berry

=== Franklin County ===
- Bobcat Hollow ATV Trails, 14 miles (23 km); Phil Campbell
- Dismals Canyon, 1 mile (1.6 km); Phil Campbell
- Hoyt Keeton Trail, 0.25 miles (0.40 km); Red Bay
- Rocky Branch Park Trail, 1.7 miles (2.7 km); Spruce Pine

=== Geneva County ===
- High Bluff Trail, 6 miles (9.7 km); Hartford
- L&N Railroad Depot Walking Trail, 0.6 miles (0.97 km); Geneva

=== Greene County ===
- Boligee Walking Trail, 0.25 miles (0.40 km); Boligee
- Forkland Park Nature Trail, 0.61 miles (0.98 km); Forkland

=== Hale County ===
- Akron Park Trail, 0.3 miles (0.48 km); Akron
- Jennings Ferry Park Nature Trail, 0.54 miles (0.87 km); Akron
- Lions Park Trail, 0.5 miles (0.80 km); Greensboro
- Moundville Archaeological Park Nature Trail, 0.5 miles (0.80 km); Moundville
- Payne Lake Nature Trail, 2.5 miles (4.0 km); Moundville
- Seldon Lock and Dam Trail; Sawyerville
- Una Martin Leisure Park Trail, 0.25 miles (0.40 km); Greensboro

=== Henry County ===
- Hardridge Creek Campground Trail; Abbeville
- Highland Park Trail; Abbeville

=== Houston County ===
- Chattahoochee Trail, 1.5 miles (2.4 km); Gordon
- Dothan Area Botanicals Garden, 0.75 miles (1.21 km); Dothan
- Eastgate Park Walking Trail, 2 miles (3.2 km); Dothan
- The Forever Wild Trails at Beaver Creek, 14.1 miles (22.7 km); Dothan
  - Beaver Tail Flats, 1 mile (1.6 km)
  - Big Levee, 3.1 miles (5.0 km)
  - Big Levee Advanced Loop, 0.4 miles (0.64 km)
  - Connector A, 0.75 miles (1.21 km)
  - Connector B, 0.5 miles (0.80 km)
  - Dragon's Tail, 2 miles (3.2 km)
  - Dragon's Tail Advanced Loop, 1.25 miles (2.01 km)
  - SAM's Creekside Trail, 1.1 miles (1.8 km)
  - Stagecoach Plateau, 1.6 miles (2.6 km)
  - Wall Ride Loop, 0.15 miles (0.24 km)
  - Zion Cemetery Ridge, 2.25 miles (3.62 km)
- Omussee Creek Park Trail; Columbia
- The Parkman Boardwalk, 0.4 miles (0.64 km); Dothan
- Troy University at Dothan Trail, 5 miles (8.0 km); Dothan
- Walton Park Walking Trail, 0.66 miles (1.06 km); Dothan
- Westgate Park Trails, over 3.25 miles (5.23 km); Dothan
  - Kiwanis Park Trail
  - Larry and Ronna Dykes Trail, 3.25 miles (5.23 km)

=== Jackson County ===
- Cathedral Caverns State Park Trails, 5.5 miles (8.9 km); Woodville
  - Blue Trail, 1.2 miles (1.9 km)
  - Gray Trail, 1.1 miles (1.8 km)
  - Green Trail, 1.8 miles (2.9 km)
  - Yellow Trail, 1.5 miles (2.4 km)
- The Forever Wild Walls of Jericho Trail System, 17 miles (27 km); Hytop
  - Bear Den Loop, 4.7 miles (7.6 km)
  - South Rim Trail, 0.5 miles (0.80 km)
  - Tennessee Trail
  - Walls of Jericho Horseback Riding Trail, 8.3 miles (13.4 km)
  - Walls of Jericho Trail, 3 miles (4.8 km)
- Goose Pond Colony Nature and Walking Trail, 2 miles (3.2 km); Scottsboro
- Historic Bridgeport Walking Trail, 2 miles (3.2 km); Bridgeport
- Lost Sink Trail, 1.7 miles (2.7 km); Paint Rock
- Pisgah Gorge, 1.5 miles (2.4 km); Pisgah
- River Mont Cave Historical Trail; Bridgeport
- Russell Cave National Monument Trail, 1.5 miles (2.4 km); Bridgeport
- Scottsboro City Park Walking Trail, 1 mile (1.6 km); Scottsboro

=== Jefferson County ===
- 16th Street Walking Trail, 0.5 miles (0.80 km); Irondale
- Aldridge Gardens Trail, 0.9 miles (1.4 km); Hoover
- Bessemer Rail Trail, 0.43 miles (0.69 km); Bessemer
- Aqueduct Greenway, 2.96 miles (4.76 km); Tarrant
  - Connector, 0.43 miles (0.69 km)
  - North, 2.21 miles (3.56 km)
  - South, 0.32 miles (0.51 km)
- Big Mountain Loop, 0.8 miles (1.3 km); Trussville
- Birmingham Botanical Gardens Walking Trail, 1.91 miles (3.07 km); Birmingham
- Birmingham Eastside EcoGardens Trail, 0.26 miles (0.42 km); Birmingham
- Black Creek Trail, 1 mile (1.6 km); Fultondale
- Boulder Canyon Loop, 1.02 miles (1.64 km); Vestavia Hills
- Brookside Greenway, 2.03 miles (3.27 km); Brookside
- Cahaba River Greenway II (a.k.a. Civitan Park Trail), 1.8 miles (2.9 km); Trussville
- Chace Lake Trail, 1.21 miles (1.95 km); Hoover
- Chapel Hills Trail, 0.65 miles (1.05 km); Fultondale
- Civil Rights Trail, 1.8 miles (2.9 km); Birmingham
- Clairmont Walking Trail, 0.8 miles (1.3 km); Birmingham
- Cosby Lake Greenway, 1.32 miles (2.12 km); Pinson
- East Lake Park Loop, 1.06 miles (1.71 km); Birmingham
- East Lake to Roebuck Park Greenway, 0.35 miles (0.56 km); Birmingham
- Ensley Park Greenway, 0.41 miles (0.66 km); Birmingham
- Ensley Park Trail, 0.33 miles (0.53 km); Birmingham
- Ensley-Pratt Greenway (a.k.a. Village Creek Greenway Phase 1), 1.2 miles (1.9 km); Birmingham
- Enon Ridge Trail (a.k.a. Dorothy Spears Greenway), 1.1 miles (1.8 km); Birmingham
- Five Mile Creek Greenway, 7.5 miles (12.1 km); Fultondale and Gardendale
  - Black Creek Park Segment, 3.5 miles (5.6 km); Fultondale
  - Black Creek Park Side Trail to Creek, 0.2 miles (0.32 km); Fultondale
  - Gardendale Segment, 2.1 miles (3.4 km); Gardendale
- Flora Johnson Nature Trail, 1.49 miles (2.40 km); Irondale
- Gardendale Urban Trail System, 3.15 miles (5.07 km); Gardendale
- George Ward Exercise Park, 1.5 miles (2.4 km); Birmingham
- High Ore Line Trail, 3.1 miles (5.0 km); Birmingham
- Homewood Forest Preserve Trail, 1.32 miles (2.12 km); Homewood
- Howze-Sanford Greenway, 0.51 miles (0.82 km); Birmingham
- Irondale Furnace Trail, 0.75 miles (1.21 km); Mountain Brook
- Irondale Greenway (a.k.a. Cahaba Riverwalk), 0.37 miles (0.60 km); Irondale
- Jefferson State Community College Combo, 2.5 miles (4.0 km); Birmingham
- Jemison Park Nature Trail, 2.5 miles (4.0 km); Hoover
- Jones Valley Trail, 0.63 miles (1.01 km); Birmingham
- Levite Jewish Community Center Trail, 5 miles (8.0 km); Mountain Brook
- Little Shades Greenway, 0.81 miles (1.30 km); Vestavia Hills
- Maplebridge-Horseshoe Ramble, 2 miles (3.2 km); Trussville
- McCallum Park Trail, 1.05 miles (1.69 km); Vestavia Hills
- MLK Jr. Drive Greenway, 0.91 miles (1.46 km); Fairfield
- Moccasin Trail; Birmingham
- Moss Rock Preserve Trails, 12.9 miles (20.8 km); Hoover
  - Red Trail, 0.87 miles (1.40 km)
  - Orange Trail, 1.6 miles (2.6 km)
  - Blue Trail, 1.65 miles (2.66 km)
  - Powerline Trail, 2 miles (3.2 km)
  - White Trail, 2.51 miles (4.04 km)
- Norwood Greenway, 1.61 miles (2.59 km); Birmingham
- Oak Hill Cemetery Walk, 0.8 miles (1.3 km); Birmingham
- Patchwork Farms Greenway, 0.35 miles (0.56 km); Vestavia Hills
- Railroad Park Rail Trails, 1.78 miles (2.86 km); Birmingham
- Reed Harvey Park Community Wetland Greenway, 0.3 miles (0.48 km); Center Point
- Reed Harvey Park Greenway, 1.05 miles (1.69 km); Center Point
- Red Mountain Preserve Trail System, 15.42 miles (24.82 km); Birmingham
  - #10 Mine Trail, 0.1 miles (0.16 km)
  - #13 Mine Trail, 0.13 miles (0.21 km)
  - #14 Mine Trail, 1.2 miles (1.9 km)
  - BMRR North Trail, 1.55 miles (2.49 km)
  - BMRR South Trail, 2.43 miles (3.91 km)
  - Eureka Mines Trail, 0.44 miles (0.71 km)
  - Ike Maston Trail, 2.93 miles (4.72 km)
  - Ishkooda Trail, 1.1 miles (1.8 km)
  - L&N Trail, 0.33 miles (0.53 km)
  - Redding Trail, 1.36 miles (2.19 km)
  - Skyhy Ridge Walk, 1.9 miles (3.1 km)
  - Smythe Trail, 0.28 miles (0.45 km)
  - Songo Trail, 0.15 miles (0.24 km)
  - Spring Gap Trail, 0.14 miles (0.23 km)
  - Stairway to #11, 0.58 miles (0.93 km)
  - TCI Connector Trail, 0.63 miles (1.01 km)
  - Wenonah Connector, 0.18 miles (0.29 km)
- Ross Bridge Greenway, 2.68 miles (4.31 km); Hoover
- Rotary Trail, 0.4 miles (0.64 km); Birmingham
- Ruffner Mountain Preserve Trail System, 14 miles (23 km); Birmingham
  - Buckeye Trail, 0.8 miles (1.3 km)
  - Crusher Trail, 0.7 miles (1.1 km)
  - Eastern Trailhead, 0.4 miles (0.64 km)
  - Geology Trail, 0.3 miles (0.48 km)
  - Lizard Loop, 1 mile (1.6 km)
  - Marian Harnach Nature Trail, 0.6 miles (0.97 km)
  - Overlook Trail, 0.4 miles (0.64 km)
  - Pipeline Trail, 1.3 miles (2.1 km)
  - Possum Loop Trail, 1.8 miles (2.9 km)
  - Quarry Trail, 1.2 miles (1.9 km)
  - Ridge and Valley Trail, 1.7 miles (2.7 km)
  - Sandstone Ridge, 0.3 miles (0.48 km)
  - Silent Journey, 0.3 miles (0.48 km)
  - Trillium Trail, 0.5 miles (0.80 km)
  - Wetlands Trail, 0.2 miles (0.32 km)
- Shades Creek Greenway (a.k.a. Lakeshore Trail), 2.96 miles (4.76 km); Homewood
- Sloss Furnaces Trail, 1 mile (1.6 km); Birmingham
- Tannehill Ironworks Historical State Park Trails, 3 miles (4.8 km); McCalla
  - Furnace Trail
  - Grist Mill Trail, 0.7 miles (1.1 km)
  - Iron Haul Road Extension, 0.5 miles (0.80 km)
  - Iron Haul Road, 1.5 miles (2.4 km)
  - Old Bucksville Stage Road, 1 mile (1.6 km)
  - Slave Quarters Trail, 1 mile (1.6 km)
  - Tramway Trail, 0.8 miles (1.3 km)
  - Tri-County Trail
- Trussville Sports Complex Trail, 1.62 miles (2.61 km); Trussville
- Turkey Creek Nature Preserve Trail System, 5.43 miles (8.74 km); Pinson
  - Boy Scout Trail, 1 mile (1.6 km)
  - Hanby Hollow, 0.9 miles (1.4 km)
  - Highlands Trail, 0.38 miles (0.61 km)
  - Narrows Ridge, 3.2 miles (5.1 km)
  - Thompson Trace, 1.4 miles (2.3 km)
- Veterans Park Greenway, 2.76 miles (4.44 km); Hoover
- Vulcan Trail, 2.28 miles (3.67 km); Birmingham
- West End Walking Trail Park; Birmingham
- Wildwood Preserve Trail, 0.52 miles (0.84 km); Birmingham

=== Lamar County ===
N/A

=== Lauderdale County ===
- The Forever Wild Billingsley-McClure Shoal Creek Nature Preserve and Recreation Center Trail System, 6.3 miles (10.1 km); Florence
  - Jones Branch Loop, 2.4 miles (3.9 km)
  - Horse Trail, 2.1 miles (3.4 km)
  - Lawson Branch Loop, 1.8 miles (2.9 km)
- Joe Wheeler State Park Trail System, 11.56 miles (18.60 km); Rogersville
  - Blue Trail, 0.9 miles (1.4 km)
  - Jimmy Sim's Trail, 1.25 miles (2.01 km)
  - Luther's Cutoff, 0.1 miles (0.16 km)
  - Luther's Pass, 2.51 miles (4.04 km)
  - Page Farm Trail, 2.92 miles (4.70 km)
  - Punisher, 0.28 miles (0.45 km)
  - Red Trail, 0.0 miles (0 km)
  - Sammy Hardin Loop, 0.7 miles (1.1 km)
  - Yellow Trail, 0.64 miles (1.03 km)
- TVA Muscle Shoals Reservation Trails, 17 miles (27 km); Florence, Muscle Shoals, and Sheffield
  - Bicycle Trail, 1.48 miles (2.38 km); Muscle Shoals and Florence
  - Energy Trail, 1.05 miles (1.69 km); Muscle Shoals
  - Gunnery Fitness Trail, 0.028 miles (0.045 km); Muscle Shoals
  - Jogging Trail, 3.1 miles (5.0 km); Muscle Shoals
  - Low Shore Trail, 0.17 miles (0.27 km); Sheffield
  - Native Plant Garden Trail, 0.31 miles (0.50 km); Sheffield
  - Old First Quarters Trail Trail, 0.18 miles (0.29 km); Muscle Shoals
  - Old Railroad Bridge Trail, 0.18 miles (0.29 km); Muscle Shoals and Florence
  - Reservation Road Trail, 2.6 miles (4.2 km); Muscle Shoals and Sheffield
  - River Heritage Park Trail, 1.42 miles (2.29 km); Florence
  - Rockpile Trail, 2.67 miles (4.30 km); Muscle Shoals
  - Southport Historical Trail, 1.29 miles (2.08 km); Muscle Shoals
  - Waterfall Walk, 0.18 miles (0.29 km); Muscle Shoals
- Wildwood Park Trail; Florence

=== Lawrence County ===
- H.A. Alexander Mini Park Trail, 0.5 miles (0.80 km); Moulton
- Joe Wheeler State Park Trail System, 11.56 miles (18.60 km); Rogersville
  - Southside Multiuse Trail, 2.26 miles (3.64 km); Red Bank
- William B. Bankhead National Forest Trails, 90 miles (140 km); Double Springs
  - Flint Creek Multiuse Trail System, 16.3 miles (26.2 km); Piney Grove
    - Red Loop (268B), 5.3 miles (8.5 km)
    - White Loop (268A), 11.0 miles (17.7 km)
  - Kinlock Shelter Trail, 1.0 mile (1.6 km); Pebble
  - Owl Creek Non-Motorized Trail System, 24.9 miles (40.1 km); Wren
    - Brushey Creek Horse - Blue Loop (220), 3.9 miles (6.3 km)
    - Key Mill Horse - Orange Loop (221), 9.8 miles (15.8 km)
    - Pine Torch Horse - Yellow Loop (222), 11.2 miles (18.0 km)
  - Sipsey Wilderness Trails, 50 miles (80 km); Moulton
    - Bee Branch Trail (204), 2.6 miles (4.2 km)
    - Borden Creek Trail (200), 2.8 miles (4.5 km)
    - Braziel Creek Trail (207), 4.6 miles (7.4 km)
    - Bunyan Hill Trail (224), 4.8 miles (7.7 km)
    - Gum Pond Trail (223), 1.8 miles (2.9 km)
    - Lookout Trail (203), 4.1 miles (6.6 km)
    - Mitchell Ridge Trail (210), 7.0 miles (11.3 km)
    - Northwest Trail (208), 7.0 miles (11.3 km)
    - Randolph Trail (202), 3.3 miles (5.3 km)
    - Rippey Trail (201), 1.9 miles (3.1 km)
    - Sipsey River Trail (209), 6.7 miles (10.8 km)
    - Thompson Creek Trail (206), 3.4 miles (5.5 km)

=== Lee County ===
- Bandy Park Walking Track, 0.5 miles (0.80 km); Opelika
- Charlotte and Curtis Ward Bike Path, 1.6 miles (2.6 km); Auburn
- Chewacla State Park Trails, more than 20 miles (32 km); Auburn
  - Armadillo Alley
  - Base CAMP Trail
  - Boy Scout Trail
  - CAMP's Trail
  - CCC Trail
  - Deer Rub Trail
  - Dell's Trail
  - Eagle Scout Trail
  - Falls View Trail
  - Flo-Rida
  - For Pete's Sake
  - Fox Trail
  - Groundhogs Day
  - High Gravity
  - Kick Six
  - Lakeside Connector
  - Mama's Milkshake
  - Mountain Laurel Trail
  - NORBA Trail
  - Old Skool
  - Rock Bottom
  - Sweet Shrub Trail
  - Tiger Woods
  - Troop 30 Trail
- Duncan Wright Fitness Trail, 0.5 miles (0.80 km); Auburn
- Kiesel Park Trail, 2.25 miles (3.62 km); Auburn
- Kreher Preserve & Nature Center Trails, 6 miles (9.7 km); Auburn
- Lake Wilmore Trail, 2.5 miles (4.0 km); Auburn
- MC Horsemanship Trails, 7 miles (11 km); Auburn
- North Technology Loop, 0.4 miles (0.64 km); Auburn
- Sam Harris Park, 0.16 miles (0.26 km); Auburn
- South Technology Park Trail, 0.6 miles (0.97 km); Auburn
- Stern Dog Park Walking Trail, 0.5 miles (0.80 km); Opelika
- Town Creek Park Trail, 0.9 miles (1.4 km); Auburn
- West Ridge Park Walking Track, 1 mile (1.6 km); Opelika
- Wood Duck Heritage Preserve & Siddique Nature Park, 2 miles (3.2 km); Opelika
  - Inner Lagoon trail
  - Lagoon Loop
  - Siddique Loop
  - Wetland Trail

=== Limestone County ===
- Limestone County Canoe & Kayak Trail, 21.9 miles (35.2 km); Elk River
- Richard Martin Trail (a.k.a. Limestone Rail-Trail), 10.8 miles (17.4 km); Elkmont
- TVA Marbut Bend Trail, 1.1 miles (1.8 km); Elkmont
- Swan Creek Greenway Trail, 2.3 miles (3.7 km); Athens

=== Lowndes County ===
- Fort Deposit Town Park Trail, 0.5 miles (0.80 km); Fort Deposit
- Holy Ground Battlefield Park Trail, White Hall
- Prairie Creek Campground Trail, Lowndesboro
- Ruby S. Moore Park Walking Trail, 0.4 miles (0.64 km); Lowndesboro

=== Macon County ===
- Tuskegee National Forest Trails, 27.3 miles (43.9 km); Tuskegee
  - Bartram National Recreation Trail, 8.5 miles (13.7 km); Tuskegee
  - Bold Destiny/Bedford V. Cash Memorial Trail, 15 miles (24 km); Tuskegee
  - Pleasant Hill Trail, 3.8 miles (6.1 km); Tuskegee

=== Madison County ===
- Aldridge Creek Greenway, 5 miles (8.0 km); Huntsville
- Atwood Drive Linear Park, 0.9 miles (1.4 km); Huntsville
- Bethel Spring Nature Preserve Trails, 1.6 miles (2.6 km); Gurley
  - Bethel Creek Loop, 0.3 miles (0.48 km)
  - Carpenter Trail, 0.4 miles (0.64 km)
  - Falling Sink Trail, 0.5 miles (0.80 km)
  - Mill Trail, 0.4 miles (0.64 km)
- Big Cove Creek Greenway, 2.8 miles (4.5 km); Huntsville
- Big Spring Park, 1.25 miles (2.01 km); Huntsville
- Blevins Gap Nature Preserve Trails, 12.5 miles (20.1 km); Huntsville
  - Bailey Cove Trail, 0.26 miles (0.42 km)
  - Bill & Marion Certain Trail, 1.97 miles (3.17 km)
  - Chittamwood Trail, 0.23 miles (0.37 km)
  - Fanning Trail, 2.04 miles (3.28 km)
  - Jones Valley Loop Trail, 0.71 miles (1.14 km)
  - Lowry Trail, 0.28 miles (0.45 km)
  - Scout Trail, 0.37 miles (0.60 km)
  - Smokerise Trail, 1.51 miles (2.43 km)
  - Stevenson Trail, 0.52 miles (0.84 km)
  - Sugar Tree Trail, 1.52 miles (2.45 km)
  - Varnedoe Trail, 1.79 miles (2.88 km)
  - Walsingham Connector, 0.18 miles (0.29 km)
  - Walsingham Trail, 0.27 miles (0.43 km)
  - West Bluff Trail, 0.8 miles (1.3 km)
- Bradford Creek Greenway, 2.3 miles (3.7 km); Madison
- Burritt on the Mountain Trails, 3.28 miles (5.28 km); Huntsville
  - Big Cove Turnpike Trail
  - Discovery Trails
  - Oak Tree Trail
  - Rock Bluff Trail
  - Trough Springs Trail
- Cavalry Hills Park Walking Trail, 0.25 miles (0.40 km); Huntsville
- Chapman Mountain Nature Preserve Trails, 3.28 miles (5.28 km); Huntsville
  - Amphitheater Trail, 0.09 miles (0.14 km)
  - Chasco Trail, 0.5 miles (0.80 km)
  - Driskell Trail, 0.88 miles (1.42 km)
  - Moonshine Trail, 0.41 miles (0.66 km)
  - Terry Trail, 1.08 miles (1.74 km)
  - Whole Planet Trail, 0.32 miles (0.51 km)
- Charles Stone Memorial Park Trail, 0.25 miles (0.40 km); Gurley
- Dublin Park Walking Trail, 1 mile (1.6 km); Madison
- Flint River Greenway, more than 6 miles (9.7 km); Huntsville
- Gateway Greenway, 0.7 miles (1.1 km); Huntsville
- Green Mountain Nature Preserve Trails, 5 miles (8.0 km); Huntsville
  - Alum Hollow Trail, 1 mile (1.6 km)
  - East Plateau Trail, 0.6 miles (0.97 km)
  - West Plateau Trail, 0.4 miles (0.64 km)
  - Stonefly Trail, 0.6 miles (0.97 km)
  - Talus Trail, 0.6 miles (0.97 km)
  - Ranger Trail, 1.2 miles (1.9 km)
  - Talus Connector, 0.3 miles (0.48 km)
  - Oak Bluff Trail, 0.6 miles (0.97 km)
  - Three Sisters Loop, 0.5 miles (0.80 km)
- Harvest Square Nature Preserve Trails, 2.31 miles (3.72 km); Harvest
  - Beaver Dam Trail, 0.21 miles (0.34 km)
  - Dry Creek Trail, 0.65 miles (1.05 km)
  - Eagle Trail, 0.27 miles (0.43 km)
  - Lookout Point Trail, 0.03 miles (0.048 km)
  - Pete's Trail, 0.26 miles (0.42 km)
  - Senators Trail, 0.89 miles (1.43 km)
- Hays Nature Preserve; Huntsville
- Huntsville Botanical Garden; Huntsville
- Huntsville Cross Country Running Park, 3 miles (4.8 km); Huntsville
- Indian Creek Greenway, 4 miles (6.4 km); Huntsville
- Little Cove Road Greenway, 5 miles (8.0 km); Huntsville
- Madison County Nature Trail, 2.25 miles (3.62 km); Huntsville
- Mill Creek Greenway, 0.6 miles (0.97 km); Madison
- Monte Sano State Park Trails, 22 miles (35 km); Huntsville
  - Fire Tower Trail
  - McKay Hollow Trail
  - Mountain Mist Loop, 6.4 miles (10.3 km)
  - North Plateau Loop, 1.9 miles (3.1 km)
  - South Plateau Loop, 3.5 miles (5.6 km)
- Monte Sano Nature Preserve Trails, 23 miles (37 km); Huntsville
  - Alms House Trail, 1.76 miles (2.83 km)
  - Annandale Trail
  - Arrowhead Trail
  - Bankhead Trail, 1.54 miles (2.48 km)
  - Bluff Line Trail, 2.57 miles (4.14 km)
  - Bushwacker Johnson Trail, 0.26 miles (0.42 km)
  - Buzzards Roost Trail, 0.36 miles (0.58 km)
  - Cold Spring Trail, 0.7 miles (1.1 km)
  - Dallas Branch Trail, 0.35 miles (0.56 km)
  - Discovery Trail, 0.21 miles (0.34 km)
  - Dummy Line Trail, 1.32 miles (2.12 km)
  - Fagan Springs Trail, 0.76 miles (1.22 km)
  - Gaslight Trail, 0.23 miles (0.37 km)
  - High Trail, 1.47 miles (2.37 km)
  - Hotel Basin, 0.12 miles (0.19 km)
  - Natural Well Trail
  - Oak Park Trail, 0.96 miles (1.54 km)
  - Old Railroad Bed Trail (a.k.a. Monte Sano Railroad Trail), 2 miles (3.2 km)
  - Quarry Road, 0.22 miles (0.35 km)
  - Sink Hole Trail, 0.11 miles (0.18 km)
  - Three Caves Loop, 0.26 miles (0.42 km)
  - Toll Gate Trail, 1.63 miles (2.62 km)
  - Trough Springs Trail, 1.34 miles (2.16 km)
  - Wagon Trail, 2.23 miles (3.59 km)
  - Waterline Trail, 0.76 miles (1.22 km)
  - Watts Trail, 0.42 miles (0.68 km)
  - Wildflower Trail, 0.58 miles (0.93 km)
  - Young-Kennedy Trail, 1.53 miles (2.46 km)
- Phillips Park Pedestrian Trail, 0.5 miles (0.80 km); Huntsville
- Rainbow Mountain Nature Preserve Trails, 3.37 miles (5.42 km); Madison
  - Balance Rock Trail, 0.27 miles (0.43 km)
  - Rainbow Loop Trail, 1.53 miles (2.46 km)
  - High Pass Trail, 0.11 miles (0.18 km)
  - Ja Moo Ko Loop Trail, 0.8 miles (1.3 km)
  - Jake Loop Trail, 0.12 miles (0.19 km)
  - Spring Trail, 0.2 miles (0.32 km)
  - Wild Trail, 0.35 miles (0.56 km)
- Redstone Arsenal Fitness Trail, 8.8 miles (14.2 km); Redstone Arsenal
- Redstone Gateway Greenway (a.k.a. EUL Greenway), 0.5 miles (0.80 km); Madison
- Tennessee River Greenway, 1.4 miles (2.3 km); Huntsville
- Trojan Trail, 3 miles (4.8 km); Hazel Green
- Wade Mountain Nature Preserve Trails, 12 miles (19 km); Huntsville
  - Bostick Trail, 1.52 miles (2.45 km)
  - Cotton Valley Trail, 0.34 miles (0.55 km)
  - Devils Racetrack, 1.74 miles (2.80 km)
  - Flemming Trail, 0.08 miles (0.13 km)
  - Fossil Bench Trail, 1.28 miles (2.06 km)
  - Harris Trail, 1.12 miles (1.80 km)
  - Low Peak Trail, 0.4 miles (0.64 km)
  - NICA Trail, 1.3 miles (2.1 km)
  - Piney Loop Trail, 0.62 miles (1.00 km)
  - Rock Wall Trail, 0.77 miles (1.24 km)
  - Shovelton Trail, 0.65 miles (1.05 km)
  - Wade Mountain Greenway, 0.87 miles (1.40 km)
  - Wade Mountain Greenway Trail, 0.34 miles (0.55 km)
  - Wade Mountain Trail, 2.14 miles (3.44 km)

=== Marengo County ===
- Demopolis Sportsplex Multipurpose Trail, 1 mile (1.6 km); Demopolis
- Foscue Creek Park Nature Trail, 1.01 miles (1.63 km); Demopolis
- Spillway Falls Park Trails, 5.4 miles (8.7 km); Demopolis
  - Bigbee Bottom Trail, 3.8 miles (6.1 km)
  - Bigbee Bottom Lower Pool Hiking Trail, 1.6 miles (2.6 km)

=== Marion County ===
- Ivan K. Hill Park Nature Trail; Winfield

=== Marshall County ===
- Albertville Community Walking Trail, 0.75 miles (1.21 km); Albertville
- Arab City Park Trail, 1 mile (1.6 km); Arab
- Lake Guntersville State Park Trails, 36 miles (58 km); Guntersville
  - Butler's Pass, 1.3 miles (2.1 km)
  - Cascade Trail, 1 mile (1.6 km)
  - Cave Alternative Trail, 0.6 miles (0.97 km)
  - Cave Trail, 1 mile (1.6 km)
  - Cutchenmine Trail, 2.25 miles (3.62 km)
  - Daniel's Trail, 0.5 miles (0.80 km)
  - Golf Course Loop Trail, 3.9 miles (6.3 km)
  - King's Chapel Trail, 0.8 miles (1.3 km)
  - Lickskillet Trail, 2.5 miles (4.0 km)
  - Little Mountain Horse Trail, 1.51 miles (2.43 km)
  - Lodge Trail
  - Main Horse Trail, 6.22 miles (10.01 km)
  - Meredith Trail, 2 miles (3.2 km)
  - Moonshine Trail, 0.7 miles (1.1 km)
  - Nature Trail, 0.5 miles (0.80 km)
  - Old Lickskillet Trail, 1 mile (1.6 km)
  - Old Still Path, 0.5 miles (0.80 km)
  - Seale's Trail, 2 miles (3.2 km)
  - Spring Trail, 0.25 miles (0.40 km)
  - Spring Trail, 0.25 miles (0.40 km)
  - Store Horse Trail, 0.22 miles (0.35 km)
  - Stubblefield Loop Horse Trail, 1.13 miles (1.82 km)
  - Taylor Mountain Trail, 1.2 miles (1.9 km)
  - Terrell Connector Trail, 0.5 miles (0.80 km)
  - Terrell Trail, 1.1 miles (1.8 km)
  - Tom Bevill Trail, 3 miles (4.8 km)
  - Village Ford Horse Trail, 1.33 miles (2.14 km)
  - Waterfall Trail
- Sunset Drive Trail, 3.7 miles (6.0 km); Guntersville
- Thompson-Eidson Park Trail, 1 mile (1.6 km); Arab
- TVA Cave Mountain Small Wild Area Trail, 1.5 miles (2.4 km); Guntersville
- TVA Cooley Cemetery Trail, 6 miles (9.7 km); Guntersville
- TVA Honeycomb Creek Small Wild Area Trail, 9.3 miles (15.0 km); Guntersville
- TVA Buck Island Small Wild Area Trail, 1.6 miles (2.6 km); Guntersville

=== Mobile County ===
- Audubon Sanctuary Trails, 1.2 miles (1.9 km); Dauphin Island
- Chickasabogue Park Trail, 20 miles (32 km); Mobile
- Citronelle Walking Trail, 2 miles (3.2 km); Citronelle
- The Forever Wild Jacinto Port Tract Trail System, 7.5 miles (12.1 km); Saraland
  - Bayou Sara Loop Trail, 1 mile (1.6 km)
  - Brickport Trail, 1.15 miles (1.85 km)
  - Furnace Hill Trail, 0.4 miles (0.64 km)
  - Longleaf Trail, 2.9 miles (4.7 km)
  - Northridge Trail, 1 mile (1.6 km)
  - Turkey Cutoff Trail, 1 mile (1.6 km)
- The Forever Wild Grand Bay Savanna Nature Preserve Boardwalk, 0.21 miles (0.34 km); Bayou La Batre
- Mobile Airport Perimeter Trail, 1.7 miles (2.7 km); Mobile
- Muddy Creek Interpretive Nature Trail, 2.3 miles (3.7 km); Mobile
- Taylor Harper Hiking and Cycling Trail, 7 miles (11 km); Dauphin Island

=== Monroe County ===
- Bells Landing Park Trail; Hybart
- CCC Trail, 1.5 miles (2.4 km); Uriah
- Claiborne Lake Dam Site East Park's Cypress Swamp Trail; Franklin
- Claiborne Lake Dam Site West Park Trail; Franklin
- Haines Island Park Trails, 3 miles (4.8 km); Franklin
  - Big-Leaf Magnolia Nature Trail, 0.8 miles (1.3 km)
  - Lower Ironwood Trail, 1.1 miles (1.8 km)
  - Upper Ironwood Trail, 1.1 miles (1.8 km)
- Isaac Creek Campground Trail; Hybart
- Tunnel Springs Rail Trail, 1.7 miles (2.7 km); Tunnel Springs

=== Montgomery County ===
- Auburn University at Montgomery Hiking & Biking Trails, 4.9 miles (7.9 km); Montgomery
  - Course A, 1 mile (1.6 km)
  - Course B, 1 mile (1.6 km)
  - Course C, 2 miles (3.2 km)
  - Entry Path, 0.9 miles (1.4 km)
- Buddy Watson Park Walking Trail; Montgomery
- Calhoun Park Walking Trail; Montgomery
- Catoma Park Walking Trail, 0.25 miles (0.40 km); Montgomery
- Cloverdale Road Park Walking Trail; Montgomery
- Dorchester Park Walking Trail; Montgomery
- Exchange Park Walking Trail; Montgomery
- Fairview Environmental Park Walking Trail; Montgomery
- Flatwood Community Center Walking Trail, 0.25 miles (0.40 km); Boylston
- Fox Hollow Park Walking Trail, 0.4 miles (0.64 km); Montgomery
- Freedom Park Walking Trail; Maxwell Air Force Base
- Gateway Park Walking Trails; Montgomery
- Gunter Hill Campground Trails, 0.5 miles (0.80 km); Montgomery
  - Loop A
  - Loop B
- Hyde Park Walking Trail; Montgomery
- Ida Belle Young Park Walking Trail, 0.6 miles (0.97 km); Montgomery
- James A. Shannon Park Walking Trail; Montgomery
- Lagoon Park Trails, 7.5 miles (12.1 km); Montgomery
  - Creek Trail, 0.9 miles (1.4 km)
  - Forest Road Trail, 1 mile (1.6 km)
  - Oak Glen, 0.25 miles (0.40 km)
  - Piney Woods Loop, 1 mile (1.6 km)
  - Single Track Trail, 1.2 miles (1.9 km)
  - Vita Course, 0.33 miles (0.53 km)
- Leu Hammonds Park Walking Trail; Montgomery
- Oak Park Walking Trail; Montgomery
- Peter Crump Park Walking Trail; Montgomery
- Pike Road Natural Trail; Pike Road
- Pine Level Park Trail, 0.75 miles (1.21 km); Pine Level
- Pintlala Park Walking Trail, 0.25 miles (0.40 km); Pintlala
- Ramer Park Walking Trail, 0.25 miles (0.40 km); Ramer
- Snowdoun Park Trail, 0.5 miles (0.80 km); Snowdoun
- Vaughn Road Park Walking Trail, 0.5 miles (0.80 km); Montgomery
- Virginia Estates Park Walking Trail, 0.45 miles (0.72 km); Montgomery
- Wares Ferry Park Walking Trail; Montgomery
- Washington Park Walking Trail; Montgomery
- Waugh Park Walking Trail, 0.25 miles (0.40 km); Waugh
- Wayne Enzor Park Walking Trail, 0.25 miles (0.40 km); Lapine
- Wingard Park Walking Trail, 0.25 miles (0.40 km); Grady
- Woodcrest Park Walking Trail; Montgomery
- Woodmere Park Walking Trail, 0.75 miles (1.21 km); Montgomery
- Wynton M. Blount Cultural Park Trails, 3.5 miles (5.6 km); Montgomery

=== Morgan County ===
- Decatur Trail (a.k.a. Dr. Bill Sims Hike-Bike Way, 14 miles (23 km); Decatur
- Point Mallard Park Trail, 3 miles (4.8 km); Decatur
- Wheeler National Wildlife Refuge Trails, 5.3 miles (8.5 km); Decatur
  - Atkeson Cypress Trail, 0.3 miles (0.48 km)
  - Beaverdam Swamp Boardwalk, 1 mile (1.6 km)
  - Dancy Bottoms Trail, 2.5 miles (4.0 km)
  - Flint Creek Trail, 1.5 miles (2.4 km)

=== Perry County ===
- Georgia Walker Memorial Walking Trail, 1 mile (1.6 km); Marion
- Perry Lakes Trail, 7 miles (11 km); Marion

=== Pickens County ===
- Pickensville Campground Trail; Pickensville

=== Pike County ===
- The Forever Wild Pike County Pocosin Complex Trail; Troy
- Heart of Dixie Trail Ride Trails, 35 miles (56 km); Troy

=== Randolph County ===
- Flat Rock Park Nature Walk; Lineville (closest town)
- Woodland Sports Complex Trail, 0.25 miles (0.40 km); Woodland

=== Russell County ===
- Idle Hour Nature Trail, 1.1 miles (1.8 km); Phenix City

=== St. Clair County ===
- Argo Walking Trail, 0.5 miles (0.80 km); Argo
- Horse Pens 40 Park Trail, 0.9 miles (1.4 km); Steele
- Pell City Lakeside Park Trails, 1.3 miles (2.1 km); Pell City
- Springville Trail, 0.5 miles (0.80 km); Springville
- Ten Islands Historic Park Nature Trail; Ragland

=== Shelby County ===
- Abby Wooley Park Walking Trail, 0.25 miles (0.40 km); Alabaster
- Akridge Arboretum Park Walking Trail, 0.25 miles (0.40 km); Calera
- Beeswax Creek Park on Lay Lake Trail, 2.84 miles (4.57 km); Columbiana
- Blue Cross and Blue Shield of Alabama Fitness Trail at University Lake, University of Montevallo, 1.3 miles (2.1 km); Montevallo
- Blue Ridge Park Trails, 1 mile (1.6 km); Hoover
- Buck Creek Greenway, 1.5 miles (2.4 km); Alabaster
- Cahaba Lily Park Nature Trail, 1.5 miles (2.4 km); Helena
- Cahaba River Park Trail System, 17 miles (27 km); Helena
  - Cahaba Shoals Loop
  - Flying Squirrel Trail
  - Northern Pines Trail
  - Reflection Trail
  - Rust Bucket Trail
  - Shoal 'Nuff Trail
  - Turtleback Ridge Trail
  - Whitetail Trail
  - Wild Turkey Trail
  - Without A Paddle Trail
- Chelsea Recreational Park Walking Track, 0.25 miles (0.40 km); Chelsea
- Coker Park Walking Track, 0.5 miles (0.80 km); Pelham
- Columbiana Sports Complex Walking Trail, 0.25 miles (0.40 km); Columbiana
- The Dog Park at Loch Haven Walking Track, 0.4 miles (0.64 km); Hoover
- Falling Rock Falls Hike, 1.81 miles (2.91 km); Montevallo
- Forest Park and Recreational Area Walking Trail, 0.25 miles (0.40 km); Sterrett
- Fun Go Holler Park Walking Track, 0.25 miles (0.40 km); Pelham
- George W. Roy Recreational Park Walking Trail, 0.5 miles (0.80 km); Calera
- Gorman Park Walking Trail, 0.25 miles (0.40 km); Vincent
- Heardmont Park Trail, 1.25 miles (2.01 km); Hoover
- Hillsboro Trail, 2 miles (3.2 km); Helena
- Heroes Park Walking Trail, 0.25 miles (0.40 km); Alabaster
- Inverness Nature Park Trails, 1.8 miles (2.9 km); Hoover
- J. W. Donahoo Park Walking Trail, 0.25 miles (0.40 km); Harpersville
- Joe Tucker Park Walking Trail, 0.25 miles (0.40 km); Helena
- Limestone Park Nature Trail, 0.25 miles (0.40 km); Alabaster
- Montevallo Greenway, 2.5 miles (4.0 km); Montevallo
- Moss Rock Preserve Trails, 12.9 miles (20.8 km); Hoover
  - Red Trail, 0.87 miles (1.40 km)
  - Orange Trail, 1.6 miles (2.6 km)
  - Blue Trail, 1.65 miles (2.66 km)
  - Powerline Trail, 2 miles (3.2 km)
  - White Trail, 2.51 miles (4.04 km)
- Oak Meadow Park Walking Trail, 0.25 miles (0.40 km); Wilsonville
- Oak Mountain State Park Trails, 60 miles (97 km); Pelham
  - Blue Trail (Hikers only), 6.7 miles (10.8 km)
  - Eagle's Nest Overlook, 0.2 miles (0.32 km)
  - Falls Creek Trail, 454 feet (0.0860 mi)
  - Green Trail (Hikers only), 2.3 miles (3.7 km)
  - Green-Red Connector, 431 feet (0.0816 mi)
  - Green-Yellow Connector, 0.4 miles (0.64 km)
  - Green-Yellow Ridge Trail, 0.3 miles (0.48 km)
  - Green-White Connector, 284 feet (0.0538 mi)
  - King's Chair Overlook, 0.4 miles (0.64 km)
  - Orange Connector, 0.7 miles (1.1 km)
  - Orange Trail System (Horses and Hikers only), over 20 miles (32 km)
    - Cabin Lake Trail
    - Christmas Tree Trail
    - Creek Valley Loop
    - Group Camp Road
    - Lake Loop
    - Ridge Trail
    - Rock Garden Trail
    - Treatment Plant Trail
    - Valley Trail
    - Wildlife Cages Trail
  - Peavine Falls Trail, 0.2 miles (0.32 km)
  - Red Road (Bikers and Hikers), 5.5 miles (8.9 km)
  - Red-Blue Connector North, 0.4 miles (0.64 km)
  - Red-Blue Connector South, 0.1 miles (0.16 km)
  - Red-White Connector, 0.2 miles (0.32 km)
  - Red Trail System (Bikers and Hikers), over 30 miles (48 km)
    - Boulder Ridge, 1.5 miles (2.4 km)
    - BUMP Connector, 0.3 miles (0.48 km)
    - BUMP Trail, 1.2 miles (1.9 km)
    - Cat Dog Snake, 1.2 miles (1.9 km)
    - Centipede, 0.9 miles (1.4 km)
    - The Chimneys, 0.9 miles (1.4 km)
    - Family Trail, 0.7 miles (1.1 km)
    - Foreplay, 0.5 miles (0.80 km)
    - Garrett's Gulch, 1.3 miles (2.1 km)
    - Group Camp Road to Garrett's Gulch, 0.6 miles (0.97 km)
    - Jekyll n Hyde, 4.4 miles (7.1 km)
    - Johnson's Mountain, 1.9 miles (3.1 km)
    - Lake Trail, 2.3 miles (3.7 km)
    - Lightning, 0.3 miles (0.48 km)
    - Mr. Toad's Wild Ride, 0.8 miles (1.3 km)
    - Rattlesnake Ridge, 2.7 miles (4.3 km)
    - Red Road (Boulder Ridge to BUMP Trail), 2.4 miles (3.9 km)
    - Seven Bridges, 1.6 miles (2.6 km)
    - Thunder, 1.9 miles (3.1 km)
    - West Ridge, 1.7 miles (2.7 km)
  - Rim Shelter Trail, 0.3 miles (0.48 km)
  - Treetop Nature Trail (Hikers only), 0.5 miles (0.80 km)
  - Scenic Creek Overlook Trail
  - White Trail (Hikers only), 6.2 miles (10.0 km)
  - White-Blue Connector, 290 feet (0.055 mi)
  - Yellow Trail (Hikers only), 6.8 miles (10.9 km)
  - Yellow-Red Connector, 0.4 miles (0.64 km)
  - Yellow-White Connector, 1.1 miles (1.8 km)
- Oliver Park Nature Trail, .25 miles (0.40 km); Calera
- Orr Park Trail, 0.8 miles (1.3 km); Montevallo
- Pea Ridge Community Park Walking Trail, 0.25 miles (0.40 km); Montevallo
- Pelham City Park Complex Walking Track, 0.5 miles (0.80 km); Pelham
- Russet Woods Park Walking Trail, 0.25 miles (0.40 km); Hoover
- Shoal Creek Park Trail, 0.5 miles (0.80 km); Montevallo
- Star Lake Park Walking Trail, 0.4 miles (0.64 km); Hoover
- Stephen's Park Walking Trail, 0.75 miles (1.21 km); Montevallo
- Sterrett Park Walking Track, 0.25 miles (0.40 km); Sterrett
- University of Phoenix Walking Trail, 1 mile (1.6 km); Meadowbrook
- Vandiver Park Walking Trail, 0.25 miles (0.40 km); Vandiver
- Veterans Park Walking Trail, 2 miles (3.2 km); Alabaster
- Veterans Park Trail, 4.8 miles (7.7 km); Hoover
- Vincent Municipal Park Walking Trail, 0.25 miles (0.40 km); Vincent
- Westover Park Walking Trail, 0.25 miles (0.40 km); Westover
- Wildflower Walking Trail, 0.2 miles (0.32 km); Hoover

=== Sumter County ===
- The University of West Alabama Wise Loop, 2.2 miles (3.5 km); Livingston

=== Talladega County ===
- Kentuck ORV Trail, 23 miles (37 km); Oxford
- Logan Martin Dam Park Hiking Trail (a.k.a. Double Cove Park), 1.45 miles (2.33 km); Alpine
- Pinecrest Veterans Park Trail, 0.5 miles (0.80 km); Sylacauga
- Sylaward Trail, 14 miles (23 km); Sylacauga
- Talladega Springs Historical Trail; Talladega Springs
- TOP Trails, more than 70 miles (110 km); Talladega

=== Tallapoosa County ===
- Charles E. Bailey, Sr. Sportplex Nature Trail, 3 miles (4.8 km); Alexander City
- Cherokee Ridge Alpine Trails at Overlook Park, 7.2 miles (11.6 km); Cherokee Bluffs
  - Cherokee Ridge Alpine Trail, 3.84 miles (6.18 km)
  - Chimney Rock Loop Trail, 2 miles (3.2 km)
  - Kowaliga Bay Loop Trail, 1.15 miles (1.85 km)
- The Forever Wild Coon Creek Nature Preserve and Recreation Area Trail System, 6 miles (9.7 km); Tallassee
  - Overlook Trail, 1 mile (1.6 km)
  - Wood Duck Trail, 5 miles (8.0 km)
- Holly Hills Trail; Jackson's Gap
- Horseshoe Bend National Military Park Nature Trail, 2.8 miles (4.5 km); Daviston
- James M. Scott Deadening Alpine Trail, 4.2 miles (6.8 km); Cherokee Bluffs
- Russell Forest Trails System, more than 100 miles (160 km); Kowaliga
  - 2-day Loop
  - Adamson Trail
  - Barn Loop
  - Big Way, 4.6 miles (7.4 km)
  - Branch Loop
  - Carriage Way
  - Dark Valley Loop
  - East Crossroads Loop
  - East/West Rail
  - Frontier Trails
  - Garnet Mine Loop
  - Green Way
  - Heavenly Loop
  - Horsely Creek Loop
  - Kowaliga Trace
  - Lakeside Loop
  - Lakeview Trail
  - Link Way, 0.8 miles (1.3 km)
  - Long Leaf Loop
  - Lover's Loop
  - Old Kowaliga Trail
  - Pitchford Creek Trail
  - Pony Express
  - Ridge Trail
  - Rock Bottom
  - Rocky Mount Loop
  - Stables Loop
  - Turtle Back Loop
  - Wind Way, 2.6 miles (4.2 km)
- Smith Mountain Fire Tower Trails, 8.6 miles (13.8 km); Jackson's Gap
  - David M. Forker Island Hop and Boat Dock Trail, 2.6 miles (4.2 km)
  - Lakeshore Trail, 2.4 miles (3.9 km)
  - Little Smith Mountain Loop Trail, 2.6 miles (4.2 km)
  - Walker Bynum Smith Mountain Tower Trail, 1 mile (1.6 km)
- Strand Park Walking Trail; Alexander City
- Wind Creek State Park Trails, 28.6 miles (46.0 km); Alexander City
  - Blue Trail, 15 miles (24 km)
  - Orange Trail, 5 miles (8.0 km)
  - Reunion Trail, 3.8 miles (6.1 km)
  - Speckled Snake Trail, 3 miles (4.8 km)
  - Yellow Trail, 1.8 miles (2.9 km)

=== Tuscaloosa County ===
- Annette M. Shelby Park Trail, 0.8 miles (1.3 km); Tuscaloosa
- Bowers Park Trail, 1 mile (1.6 km); Tuscaloosa
- Coaling Town Park Walking Trail, 0.7 miles (1.1 km); Tuscaloosa
- Deerlick Creek Campground Trails, 1.5 miles (2.4 km); Cottondale
  - Gobbler Ridge Hiking Trail, 0.5 miles (0.80 km)
  - Beech Tree Hollow Trail, 1.0 mile (1.6 km)
- Jaycee Park Trail, 1.5 miles (2.4 km); Tuscaloosa
- Kentuck Park Trail, 0.3 miles (0.48 km); Tuscaloosa
- Lake Lurleen State Park Tashka Trail System, 23.47 miles (37.77 km); Coker
  - 5 Oaks Loop Trail, 3 miles (4.8 km)
  - Lakeside Trail, 2 miles (3.2 km)
  - Lightning Loop Trail, 0.43 miles (0.69 km)
  - Ridge Loop Trail, 4 miles (6.4 km)
  - Roadway, 1.3 miles (2.1 km)
  - Storm Loop Trail, 1.44 miles (2.32 km)
  - Tashka Trail, 9 miles (14 km)
  - Tornado Loop Trail, 2.3 miles (3.7 km)
- Monnish Park Multi-Use Trail, 0.4 miles (0.64 km); Tuscaloosa
- Munny Sokol Trails, 15 miles (24 km); Tuscaloosa
- Palmore Park Trail, 0.5 miles (0.80 km); Tuscaloosa
- Queen City Park Trail, 1.1 miles (1.8 km); Tuscaloosa
- Richard L. Platt Memorial Levee Trail, 2.5 miles (4.0 km); Tuscaloosa
- River Road East Park, 1.5 miles (2.4 km); Tuscaloosa
- Rocky Branch Trail, 5 miles (8.0 km); Tuscaloosa
- Snow Hinton Trail, 1 mile (1.6 km); Tuscaloosa
- Tannehill Ironworks Historical State Park Trails, 3 miles (4.8 km); McCalla
  - Furnace Trail
  - Grist Mill Trail, 0.7 miles (1.1 km)
  - Iron Haul Road Extension, 0.5 miles (0.80 km)
  - Iron Haul Road, 1.5 miles (2.4 km)
  - Old Bucksville Stage Road, 1 mile (1.6 km)
  - Slave Quarters Trail, 1 mile (1.6 km)
  - Tramway Trail, 0.8 miles (1.3 km)
  - Tri-County Trail

=== Walker County ===
- Horse Creek Trail, 3.2 miles (5.1 km); Dora and Sumiton
- Sumiton Trail, 1 mile (1.6 km); Sumiton

=== Washington County ===
- Old St. Stephens Historical Park Trails; St. Stephens

=== Wilcox County ===
- Bridgeport Beach Trail; Camden
- Chilatchee Creek Park Trail; Alberta
- Holleys Ferry Park Trail; Camden
- Millers Ferry Campground Trail; Millers Ferry
- Roland Cooper State Park Trails; Camden

=== Winston County ===
- KC Ranch Horse Camp, 25 miles (40 km); Double Springs
- Lakeside Trail, 1.9 miles (3.1 km); Haleyville
- William B. Bankhead National Forest Trails, 90 miles (140 km); Double Springs
  - Sipsey Wilderness Trails, 50 miles (80 km); Moulton
    - Borden Creek Trail (200), 2.8 miles (4.5 km)
    - Randolph Trail (202), 3.3 miles (5.3 km)
    - Rippey Trail (201), 1.9 miles (3.1 km)
    - Sipsey River Trail (209), 6.7 miles (10.8 km)

== See also ==
- List of Hiking Trails in the United States
