= Jugtown, Alabama =

Jugtown, Alabama may refer to:

- Gardendale, Alabama, formerly known as Jugtown
- Sterrett, Alabama, also known as Jugtown
