= Cecil Ashburn Drive =

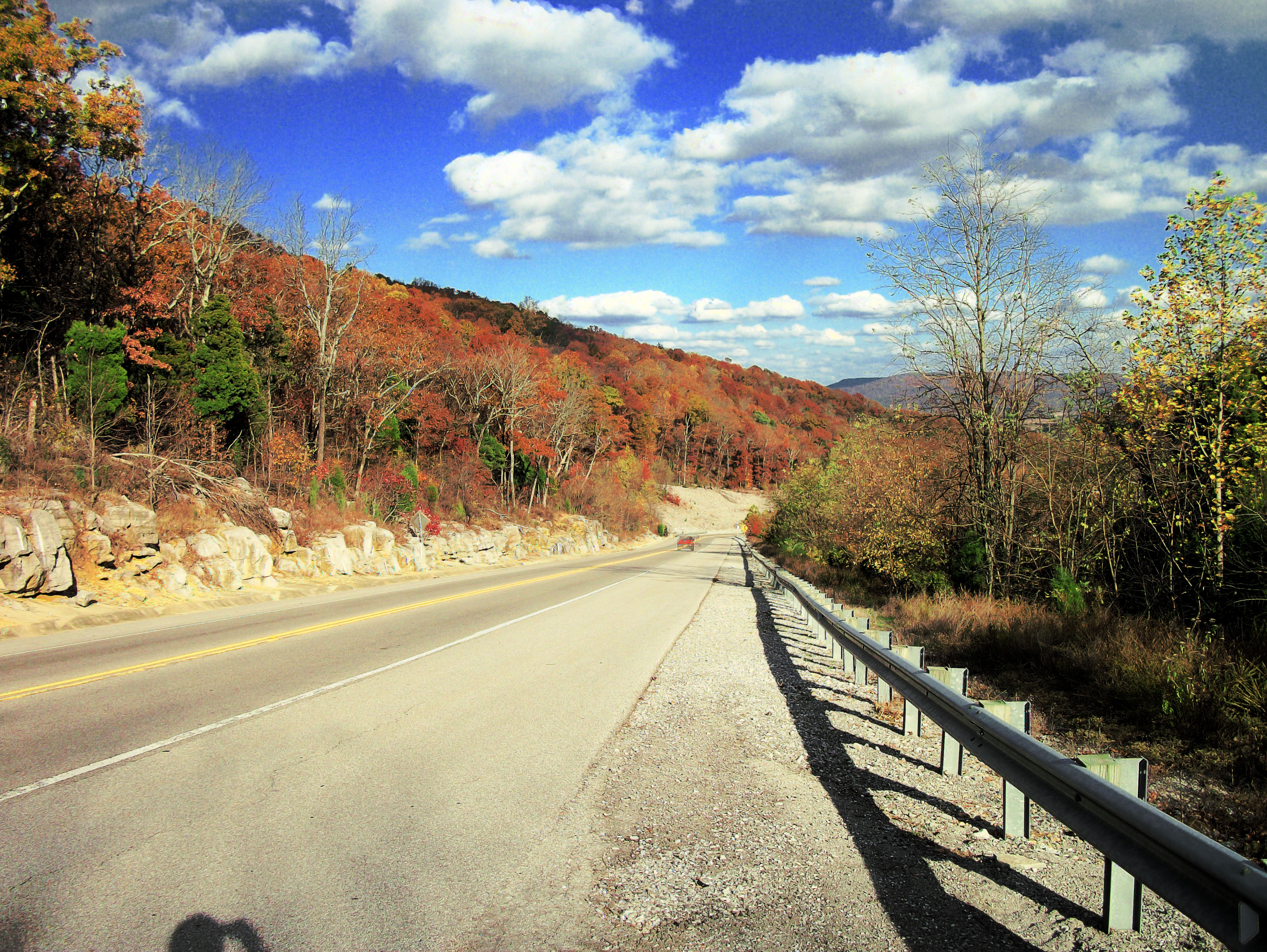
- Length: 3.6 mi (5.8 km)
- Location: Huntsville, Alabama
- East end: Old Big Cove Road continues as Sutton Road
- West end: Carl T. Jones Drive; Bailey Cove Road continues as Four Mile Post Road

Cecil Ashburn Drive is a major road in South Huntsville that carries nearly 20,000 vehicles across Huntsville Mountain in and out of the city from neighboring subdivisions. The scenic mountain route is a four-lane road with eight-foot shoulders on both sides to allow joggers and bicyclists to safely travel the road. Initially a two-lane road, the city of Huntsville widened 3.4 miles of Cecil Ashburn Drive, beginning at Donegal Drive to Taylor Road. The widening project began in January 2019 and was completed in August 2020. The project converted Cecil Ashburn Drive into a four-lane divided highway.

Cecil Ashburn connects Hampton Cove and Jones Valley and provides an alternative way for people to get through, into, and out of Huntsville.

== Road description ==
Cecil Ashburn Drive is a part of a line of roads that connect Whitesburg Drive in Southeast Huntsville to U.S. Highway 72 in Gurley.

From the west, the road starts as Four Mile Post Road running through a dense residential neighborhood and runs pass Jones Family Park, Atwood Linear Park Greenway, and Valley Bend At Jones Farm. Upon intersecting Carl T. Jones Drive and Bailey Cove Road, the road takes on the name Cecil Ashburn Drive where it widens to five lanes (one of those being the center turn lane) and travels through a strip building retail area until almost at the base of the mountain. As it starts up the mountain, the road narrows to two lanes. The road twists along the mountain with limited access; only two intersections occur while traveling across the mountain: Avalon Drive and one parking lot for hikers. The road travels through the Blevins Gap Nature Preserve and provides trail heads for numerous hiking trails.

Once on the east side of the mountain, the road intersects Old Big Cove Road and becomes Sutton Road. After a short stretch, the road widens back to four lanes and intersects Taylor Road followed by U.S. Highway 431 where the road takes on the name Old Highway 431. This portion is a part of the future Bypass Network for the city of Huntsville and is also known as the Eastern Bypass as it travels through Hampton Cove and the Robert Trent Jones Golf Trail. The road eventually narrows down to two lanes and a turn lane, becomes Little Cove Road and connects to U.S. Highway 72.

== History ==
The road was built in the late 1990s and opened to traffic in January 2000 as a quick way for the fast-growing Hampton Cove subdivision to access Huntsville. The City of Huntsville named the road after James Cecil Ashburn in January 2002.

== Safety ==
The safety of the road has been called into question following multiple deadly wrecks. Most wrecks generally occur along the same stretch of road and are similar in details: a car traveling west into the city loses control while traveling around a curve near Avalon Drive. The wrecks sometimes occur after rain, but just as often in dry, clear conditions, and the vehicle generally hits another vehicle head on. Each wreck has been found to be due to driver error, and not the road's design.

As of June 2018, a total of eleven people have been killed on the road since it opened. In June 2012, one person died and four others were injured in a wreck near Avalon Drive, the same location where two young women were killed in December 2011. More recently, on September 28, 2014, another person died in a wreck which also injured four others. This most recent wreck happened on the straightest part of the road, during a dry, sunny day. One driver simply crossed the yellow line and hit another vehicle head on with no warning. The cause was driver error.

Once the roadwork improvements to Cecil Ashburn Drive are completed and it is converted into a divided highway, fatalities should be greatly reduced.
