= Alabama Plating Company Superfund site =

American former industrial site

Alabama Plating Company
- Superfund site
- Location within Alabama
- Location: Vincent, Shelby, Alabama; 33.3997°N 86.4050°W

Information
- CERCLIS ID: ALD004022448
- Contaminants: Arsenic; Cadmium; Chromium; Copper; Cyanide; Lead; Nickel; Zinc
- Responsible parties: Alabama Plating Co.

Progress
- Proposed: August 24, 2000
- Listed: September 18, 2012
- Construction completed: June 21, 2018

The Alabama Plating Company Superfund site is a former industrial site in Vincent, Alabama. The site covers 6 acres and was used by the Alabama Plating Company as an electroplating facility between 1956-1986. The facility caused contamination of the ground water with hazardous waste containing heavy metals. After assessment by the United States Environmental Protection Agency (EPA) it was added to the National Priorities List in September 2012 for remedial action. The site cleanup is directed by the federal Superfund program.

== History ==
In 1970, the site was identified as a new source of pollution by the Alabama Water Improvement Commission, and one of eleven industries notified to present plans for "abatement of their pollution of state waters". By 1980, the company had gained a permit to discharge treated water into the Spring Creek. In 1986, the company was ordered by the Alabama Department of Environmental Management to clean up a section of the Spring Creek where contaminated sediment had built up, following a treatment process failure. The company received further ADEM orders in 1990 and 1991 in relation to delays in cleaning up contaminated groundwater and closing containment ponds at the site.

=== Lawsuit ===
In June 1991, the Alabama Plating Company demanded that the costs for cleanup at the site be covered under its insurance's "comprehensive general liability" policy with the United States Fidelity and Guaranty Company, as well as its "excess liability" policies with Safety National Casualty Corporation and Ranger Insurance Company. All three companies refused, and were then sued by the Alabama Plating Company, who alleged breach of contract, fraudulent misrepresentation, bad faith, and other charges related to wrongful denial of coverage. The company also sued Hilb, Rogal and Hamilton Company of Birmingham, Inc, the insurance agency through which they had obtained coverage, for fraudulent misrepresentation and negligence.

The Alabama Plating Company had argued that the policy, which covered pollution cleanup costs only in cases in which the pollution was "sudden and accidental" which the company claimed its incidents had fulfilled.

== Contamination ==
The contamination at the site originates from a liquid byproduct, created from the electroplating process. This byproduct contained cadmium, chromium, cyanide, and zinc. A mechanical treatment system, in which the heavy metals would be settled out in containment ponds before draining the wastewater into the Spring Creek, was employed to prevent pollution. However, failures of the treatment system led to a buildup of contaminated sediment in the creek, as well as groundwater contamination.

== See also ==
- Toxic heavy metals
