= Roy C. Craven =

American art historian

Roy C. Craven (Roy Curtis Craven, Jr.) was (born in Cherokee Bluffs, Alabama on July 29, 1924. - May 30, 1996) He was the founding director of the University Gallery at the University of Florida.

Roy C. Craven authored, co-authored, and co-created (as with contributing the prologue and serving as photographer for Indian Art of Ancient Florida ) numerous scholarly books and publications on art (which are used in class syllabi and cited in other scholarly publications), including:

- Indian Art: A Concise History
- From the ocean of painting : India's popular paintings, 1589 to the present
- Ceremonial centers of the Maya
- Ten contemporary painters from India
- A treasury of Indian miniature paintings
- Ramayana: Pahari Paintings
- A Concise History of Indian Art, "The World of Art Library" series
- The Art of India from Florida Collections
- Los Olmecas : the parent civilization of Mesoamerica
- Indian sculpture in the John and Mable Ringling Museum of Art
- Arts of India : selections from the Samuel P. Harn Museum of Art collection, University of Florida
- Pre-Columbian pottery of Peru from the collection of the University Gallery
- From fabled fields : selections from the Paddock family collection of Pre-Columbian art : an exhibition organized by the Norton Museum of Art, November 19, 1994-January 8, 1995
- Of sky and earth : art of the early Southeastern Indians : October 1-November 28, 1982, the High Museum of Art, Atlanta, Georgia
