= Enon Ridge =

Neighborhood in Birmingham, Alabama

Coordinates: 33°31′37″N 86°49′50″W

Enon Ridge is a neighborhood in Birmingham, Alabama. The hilly 180-acre area was home to Carrie A. Tuggle's Tuggle Institute which is now Tuggle Elementary. It was home to middle class African Americans. It borders the Smithfield neighborhood.

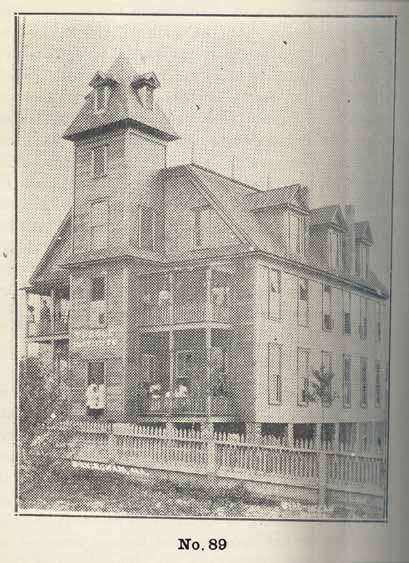
The Tuggle Institute in 1906

Enon Ridge Cemetery is an early Jewish cemetery in the area. Enon Ridge Pioneer Cemetery is the burial site of some of the area's early American settlers. Davenport and Harris Funeral Home was established in Enon Ridge and continues there. Old Sardis Baptist Church is also in Enon Ridge.

In 2017 the city approved a project to build affordable homes in Enon Ridge. In 2018 one of the program's homes was completed. Mayor William Bell was part of the initiation of construction on the trail segment begun in 2013.

There is an Enon Ridge Trail which connects to the Smithfield Trail and is part of the Red Rock Trail. The Freshwater Land Trust has funded improvements on the trail.

Businessman A. G. Gaston lived in Enon Ridge with his mother and studied at Tuttle Institute.

Photograph of Carrie A. Tuggle Elementary School

Tuggle Memorial, a stele in Birmingham's Kelly Ingram Park, was unveiled by two of Tuggle's descendants and received support from Dr. A. G. Gaston, a Birmingham businessman who studied in the Tuggle Institute. The stele recognizes her work on behalf of orphans and juvenile defendants, as well as her role as a philanthropist and educator.

Civil rights leader Angela Davis attended Carrie A. Tuggle Elementary School.

== See also ==
- List of neighborhoods in Birmingham, Alabama
- List of hiking trails in Alabama
