= List of National Water Trails =

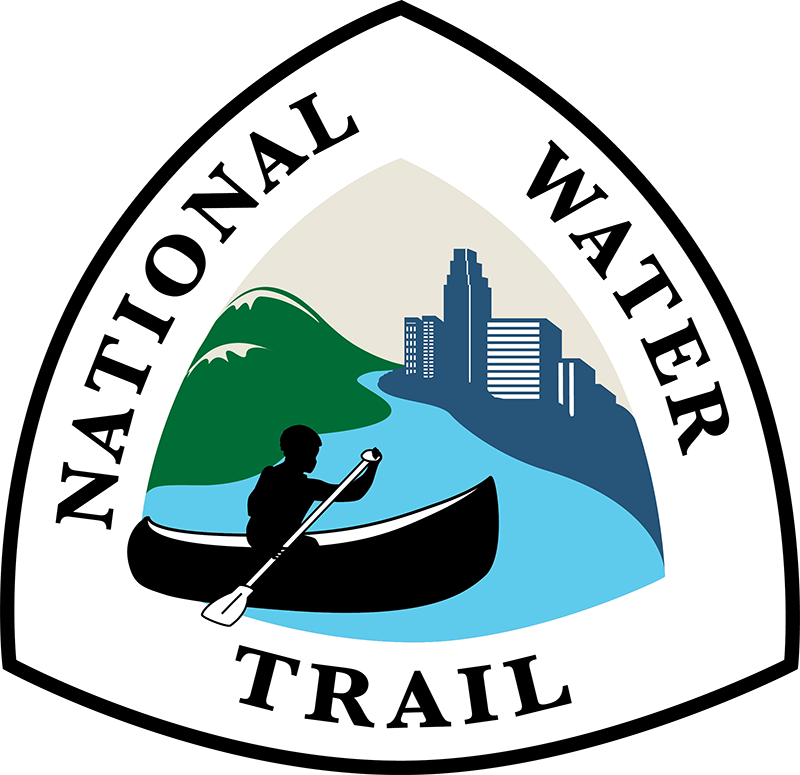
National Water Trail shield

This is list of water trails designated as part of the National Water Trails System in the United States. The designation was established by the National Park Service in 2012 as a subclass of trails in the National Recreation Trails Program, itself a component of the National Trails System. National Water Trails are fit for navigation by small, non-motorized vessels such as canoes, kayaks, and rafts. Eligible trails must be complete, well designed and maintained, and open to the public. As of September 2025, there are 41 National Water Trails. A number of additional water trails have been designated as National Recreation Trails, but not explicitly as National Water Trails.

== List ==
Name	State	Length
Alabama Scenic River Trail	AL	631 mi (1,015 km)
Arkansas River Water Trail	KS	192 mi (309 km)
Bayou Teche Paddle Trail	LA	135 mi (217 km)
Black Canyon Water Trail	AZ, NV	30 mi (48 km)
Bronx River Blueway	NY	8 mi (13 km)
Chattahoochee River National Recreation Area Water Trail	GA	48 mi (77 km)
Chippewa River Water Trail	WI	4.2 mi (6.8 km)
Comal River Water Trail	TX	1.5 mi (2.4 km)
Cuyahoga River Water Trail	OH	41 mi (66 km)
Fabulous Fox! Water Trail	IL, WI	158 mi (254 km)
Flint River Water Trail	MI	73 mi (117 km)
Great Miami River Watershed Water Trail	OH	291 mi (468 km)
Great Pinery Heritage Waterway	WI	20.8 mi (33.5 km)
Green and Nolin Rivers Blueway	KY	36 mi (58 km)
Hudson River Greenway Water Trail	NY	256 mi (412 km)
Huron River Water Trail	MI	104 mi (167 km)
Kankakee River Water Trail	IN	133 mi (214 km)
Kansas River Trail	KS	173 mi (278 km)
Kitsap Peninsula Water Trail	WA	371 mi (597 km)
Mississippi National River and Recreation Area Water Trail	MN	76 mi (122 km)
Mississippi River Water Trail	IL, MO	121 mi (195 km)
Missouri National Recreational River Water Trail	IA, NE, SD	147 mi (237 km)
Mohave Water Trail	AZ, NV	76 mi (122 km)
Musconetcong Watershed National Water Trail	NJ	42 mi (68 km)
New York State Canalway Water Trail	NY	450 mi (720 km)
North Carolina Smoky Mountain Blueways	NC	167 mi (269 km)
Ohio River Water Trail around Parkersburg, West Virginia	OH, WV	57 mi (92 km)
Ohio River Way	IN, IL, OH	308 mi (496 km)
Okefenokee Wilderness Canoe Trail System	GA	120 mi (190 km)
Red Rock Water Trail	IA	36 mi (58 km)
Rock River Water Trail	IL, WI	320 mi (510 km)
Schuylkill River Water Trail	PA	137 mi (220 km)
Shiawassee River Water Trail	MI	88 mi (142 km)
South Carolina Revolutionary Rivers Trail	SC	60 mi (97 km)
St. Louis River Estuary Water Trail	MN, WI	16.5 mi (26.6 km)
Suwannee River Wilderness Trail	FL, GA	235 mi (378 km)
The Island Loop Route	MI	10.2 mi (16.4 km)
Trinity River Paddling Trail	TX	130 mi (210 km)
Tualatin River Water Trail	OR	38.5 mi (62.0 km)
Waccamaw River Blue Trail	SC	100 mi (160 km)
Willamette River Water Trail	OR	217 mi (349 km)
