= Hillsboro Trail =

Rail trail in Shelby County, Alabama

Coordinates: 33.27653°N 86.87280°W

- Length: 1.9 mi (3.1 km)
- Location: Shelby County, at Montevallo, Alabama, USA
- Trailheads: Helena, Alabama
- Use: Hiking, biking
- Elevation change: Negligible
- Difficulty: Easy
- Season: All
- Sights: Forest, wetland, historic features
- Website: Hillsboro Trail Location of trail in Alabama

The Hillsboro Trail is a rail trail in Shelby County, Alabama. The 12-foot-wide trail extends 1.9 miles (3.1 km) along the former roadbed of the Helena & Blocton branch line of the Birmingham Mineral Railroad, a subsidiary of the Louisville & Nashville Railroad.

== Historical rail use ==
Around July 1889, the Louisville & Nashville (L&N) Railroad completed a branch line off of the L&N controlled South & North Alabama Railroad from just northwest of Helena, Alabama to Gurnee Junction, Alabama. At Gurnee Junction, the line connected with Southern Railway predecessor Brierfield, Blocton & Birmingham Railway over which L&N had trackage rights, allowing L&N to access the rich mineral resources of the Cahaba Basin, particularly coal. As the mines were exhausted and economic pressures mounted in the mid-1900s, the line was abandoned and the rails removed.

== Present trail ==
In 2008 the portion of the former rail bed in Helena between Appleford Drive and the operating CSX Lineville Subdivision was turned into an asphalt paved walking trail as part of the Hillsboro housing development. By 2010 the asphalt-paved trail had been extended further west along the former railroad bed to the site of the present Helena Middle School. As part of the extension to the west, the trail passes under Shelby County highway 52 in tunnel measuring approximately 100 feet long, 10 feet high, and 24 feet wide with stone facades.

At the Lineville Subdivision, the Hillsboro Trail turns to the northeast off the former roadbed which continues past the Lineville Subdivision to the CSX S&NA South Subdivision. Visible remnants of the historical use of the right-of-way include a concrete railroad milepost on the west side of the trail and remnants of railroad ties. The trail lies opposite a 19th-century coke oven historic site across a narrow wetland; future restoration of the coke oven site is planned.

The trail runs primarily through new growth forest; the area was extensively mined for coal and timber cleared between the mid-19th and 20th centuries. Since abandonment of the railroad, the forest has been allowed to regrow.

== See also ==
- List of Hiking Trails in Alabama
