= Alabama Scenic River Trail =

Coordinates: 33.005865°N 86.520926°W

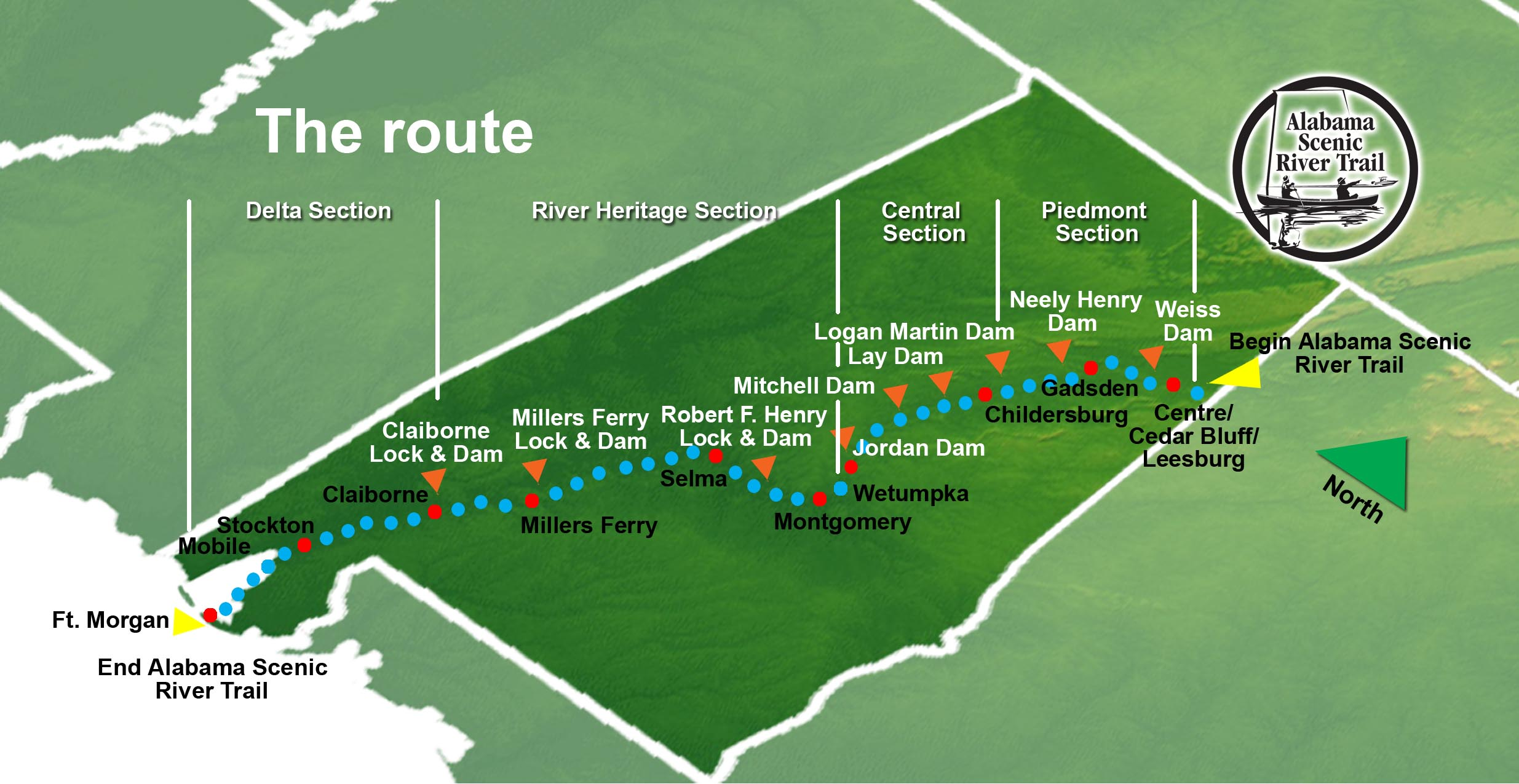
- Overview of the Alabama Scenic River Trail route
- Location: Alabama, USA
- Area: approx. 632 miles long
- Established: 2008

The Alabama Scenic River Trail (ASRT) is a water trail that spans the state of Alabama. The trail starts in northeast Alabama on the Coosa River's Weiss Lake at the Georgia-Alabama state line and ends at Fort Morgan, Alabama, where Mobile Bay meets the Gulf of Mexico. It comprises sections of the Coosa, Tallapoosa, Alabama, and Mobile rivers.

Extending more than 630 miles, the ASRT is "the nation’s longest one-state river trail," and it was designated as a National Recreation Trail in 2009 by Dirk Kempthorne, then the United States Secretary of the Interior. It was designated a National Water Trail in 2012 by Kempthorne's successor, Ken Salazar.

Because the trail's route extends through diverse topographic and climatic conditions, paddlers along the trail may encounter a wide and changing variety of flora and fauna. Over one hundred trail access points and nearly that many campsites are available for public use, many provided by private landowners who are known as "trail angels."

Although most paddlers take on only a section of the trail, some "through paddlers" have completed the entire route from Weiss Lake to Mobile Bay.

The Alabama Scenic River Trail is also a nonprofit organization in Alabama that works to improve water-recreation opportunities across the state.

== See also ==
- List of Hiking Trails in Alabama
