= Vincent, Alabama =

City in Alabama, United States

- City
- Location of Vincent in Shelby County and St. Clair County and Talladega County, Alabama.
- Coordinates: 33°23′9″N 86°24′36″W
- Country: United States
- State: Alabama
- Counties: Shelby, St. Clair, Talladega

Government
  - Mayor: James D Latimer

Area
  - Total: 20.96 sq mi (54.29 km^{2})
  - Land: 20.58 sq mi (53.31 km^{2})
  - Water: 0.38 sq mi (0.98 km^{2})
- Elevation: 466 ft (142 m)

Population (2020)
  - Total: 1,982
  - Density: 96.3/sq mi (37.18/km^{2})
- Time zone: UTC-6 (CST)
  - Summer (DST): UTC-5 (CDT)
- ZIP code: 35178
- Area codes: 205, 659
- FIPS code: 01-79008
- GNIS feature ID: 2406802
- Website: www.townofvincent.com

Vincent, originally known as Propel, is a city in Shelby, St. Clair, and Talladega counties in the U.S. state of Alabama. At the 2020 census, the population was 1,982. The community was first known as Propel, but later named Vincent in honor of the Vincent family, who were early settlers of the area. It was incorporated in 1897.

== Geography ==
The city is located mostly in the northeastern part of Shelby County, with portions of the city limits extending into neighboring St. Clair and Talladega counties. U.S. Route 231 is the main highway through the city, leading northeast 17 mi (27 km) to Pell City and southwest 3 mi (5 km) to Harpersville. Alabama State Route 25 also runs through the city, splitting off from US 231 north of town and leading northwest 7 mi (11 km) to Sterrett.

According to the U.S. Census Bureau, the town has a total area of 20.0 square miles (51.7 km^{2}), of which 19.6 square miles (50.7 km^{2}) is land and 0.39 square miles (1.0 km^{2}), or 1.90%, is water.

== Demographics ==
Historical population
| Census | Pop. | Note | %± |
|---|---|---|---|
| 1900 | 765 | | — |
| 1910 | 995 | | 30.1% |
| 1920 | 1,034 | | 3.9% |
| 1930 | 1,192 | | 15.3% |
| 1940 | 1,108 | | −7.0% |
| 1950 | 1,240 | | 11.9% |
| 1960 | 1,402 | | 13.1% |
| 1970 | 1,419 | | 1.2% |
| 1980 | 1,652 | | 16.4% |
| 1990 | 1,767 | | 7.0% |
| 2000 | 1,853 | | 4.9% |
| 2010 | 1,988 | | 7.3% |
| 2020 | 1,982 | | −0.3% |
U.S. Decennial Census; 2013 Estimate

=== 2020 census ===
Vincent city, Alabama – Racial and ethnic composition Note: the US Census treats Hispanic/Latino as an ethnic category. This table excludes Latinos from the racial categories and assigns them to a separate category. Hispanics/Latinos may be of any race.
| Race / Ethnicity (NH = Non-Hispanic) | Pop 2000 | Pop 2010 | Pop 2020 | % 2000 | % 2010 | % 2020 |
|---|---|---|---|---|---|---|
| White alone (NH) | 1,485 | 1,555 | 1,493 | 80.14% | 78.22% | 75.33% |
| Black or African American alone (NH) | 323 | 394 | 384 | 17.43% | 19.82% | 19.37% |
| Native American or Alaska Native alone (NH) | 14 | 5 | 8 | 0.76% | 0.25% | 0.40% |
| Asian alone (NH) | 4 | 2 | 2 | 0.22% | 0.10% | 0.10% |
| Native Hawaiian or Pacific Islander alone (NH) | 0 | 0 | 0 | 0.00% | 0.00% | 0.00% |
| Other race alone (NH) | 0 | 0 | 11 | 0.00% | 0.00% | 0.55% |
| Mixed race or Multiracial (NH) | 14 | 19 | 47 | 0.76% | 0.96% | 2.37% |
| Hispanic or Latino (any race) | 13 | 13 | 37 | 0.70% | 0.65% | 1.87% |
| Total | 1,853 | 1,988 | 1,982 | 100.00% | 100.00% | 100.00% |

As of the 2020 United States census, there were 1,982 people, 722 households, and 490 families residing in the town.

=== 2010 census ===
As of the census of 2010, there were 1,988 people, 802 households, and 575 families residing in the town. The population density was 101.4 inhabitants per square mile (39.2/km^{2}). There were 895 housing units at an average density of 45.7 per square mile (17.6/km^{2}). The racial makeup of the town was 78.7% White, 19.8% Black or African American, 0.4% Native American, 0.1% Asian, 0.1% some other race, and 1.0% from two or more races. 0.7% of the population were Hispanic or Latino of any race.

There were 802 households, out of which 31.7% had children under the age of 18 living with them, 52.1% were headed by married couples living together, 16.7% had a female householder with no husband present, and 28.3% were non-families. 25.4% of all households were made up of individuals, and 9.2% were someone living alone who was 65 years of age or older. The average household size was 2.48 and the average family size was 2.95.

In the town, the population was spread out, with 22.7% under the age of 18, 7.4% from 18 to 24, 23.9% from 25 to 44, 31.2% from 45 to 64, and 14.6% who were 65 years of age or older. The median age was 42.0 years. For every 100 females, there were 87.9 males. For every 100 females age 18 and over, there were 84.0 males.

For the period 2007–2011, the estimated median annual income for a household in the town was $43,125, and the median income for a family was $54,640. Male full-time workers had a median income of $44,310 versus $31,467 for females. The per capita income for the town was $22,782. About 2.7% of families and 6.2% of the population were below the poverty line, including 0% of those under age 18 and 14.4% of those age 65 or over.

== Government ==
The City of Vincent operates under a Mayor-Council form of government.

=== Mayor ===
- James D. Latimer

=== City Council ===
- District 1: Gary Anaker
- District 2: Samecca McCrimon
- District 3: Darryl Wood
- District 4: Ralph Kimble Jr.
- District 5: Corey Abrams

In August 2022, the city council disbanded its three-member police department following an incident where a racist text circulated on social media.

== Notable residents ==
- Percy McGraw Putts Sr., lawyer and state legislator

== See also ==
- Alabama Plating Company Superfund site
