= Jones Valley, Huntsville =

Jones Valley
- Neighborhood of Huntsville, Alabama
- Interactive map of Jones Valley
- Coordinates: 34.5825914°N 86.5558243°W
- Country: United States
- State: Alabama
- County: Madison
- Elevation: 560 ft (170 m)
- Time zone: UTC-6 (Central (CST))
  - Summer (DST): UTC-5 (CDT)
- ZIP code: 35801-35802
- Area code: 256
- GNIS feature ID: 121029

Jones Valley is an urbanized valley and region of Huntsville, Alabama. The community is bordered by Monte Sano Mountain and Green Mountain to the east and Waltons Mountain to the west.

Jones Valley houses a variety of homes, ranging from mid-century houses to mountaintop estates. A park called Jones Farm Park sits adjacent to Carl T. Jones Drive. It contains miles of walking trails and two ponds. The Ledges, a private golf club and gated community, is also located in Jones Valley.

== History ==
The area was founded by Carl T. Jones, who purchased a 2,500 acre farm in 1939. Although much of that land has been developed, 33 acres have been preserved and opened to the public as the Jones Farm Park. The park contains two ponds, a pavilion, and a system of paved walking trails.

== Education ==
Huntsville City Schools oversees the seven public schools located in the area. Jones Valley contains three schools that serve grades K-5 (Jones Valley Elementary, Chaffee Elementary, and Weatherly Heights Elementary), one school that serves grades K-8 (Whitesburg School), one middle school that serves grades 6-8 (Huntsville Junior High), and one high school that serves grades 9-12 (Virgil I. Grissom High). There are also several private schools in the area. Randolph is a college preparatory school that serves grades K-12. Others include Whitesburg Christian Academy and Holy Spirit School.
