= Jackson's Gap, Alabama =

- Town
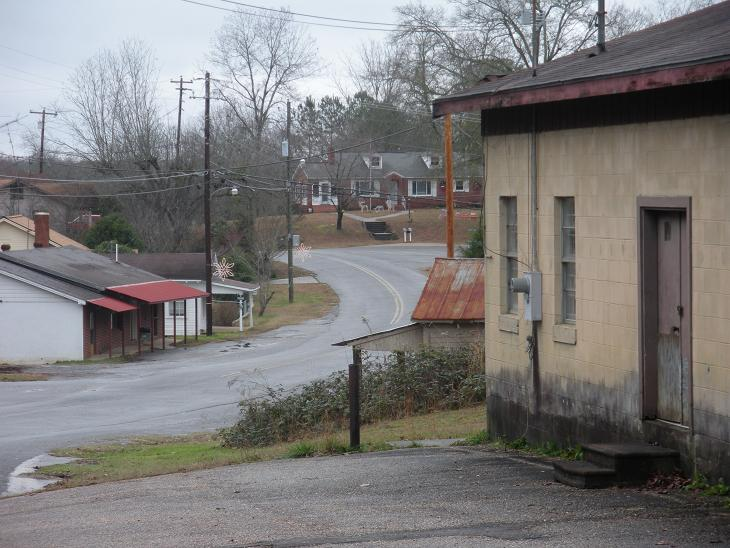
- Jackson's Gap in 2008

- Location of Jacksons' Gap in Tallapoosa County, Alabama.
- Coordinates: 32°52′35″N 85°49′17″W
- Country: United States
- State: Alabama
- County: Tallapoosa

Area
  - Total: 8.54 sq mi (22.11 km^{2})
  - Land: 8.52 sq mi (22.06 km^{2})
  - Water: 0.019 sq mi (0.05 km^{2})
- Elevation: 653 ft (199 m)

Population (2020)
  - Total: 747
  - Density: 87.7/sq mi (33.87/km^{2})
- Time zone: UTC-6 (Central (CST))
  - Summer (DST): UTC-5 (CDT)
- ZIP code: 36861
- Area code: 256
- FIPS code: 01-38248
- GNIS feature ID: 2405902
- Website: https://jgap-al.com/

Jackson's Gap (sometimes spelled Jacksons' Gap) is a town in Tallapoosa County, Alabama, United States. It incorporated in 1980. At the 2010 census the population was 828, up from 761.

== Geography ==
Jackson's Gap is located in east- central Alabama. It includes land bordering Lake Martin.

According to the U.S. Census Bureau, the town has a total area of 8.4 square miles (22 km^{2}), all land.

== History ==
Jackson's Gap was named for a local settler in the early 19th century. The town got its name after a man erected a cabin and traded with the Creeks and local settlers and travelers, possibly in the 1810s or 1820s. Some time after, a fellow named Patterson established a blacksmith shop there, and more settlers began to arrive from Georgia and South Carolina in the 1830s.

== Demographics ==
Historical population
Census	Pop.	Note	%±
1890	207		—
1990	789		—
2000	761		−3.5%
2010	828		8.8%
2020	747		−9.8%
U.S. Decennial Census; 2013 Estimate

As of the census of 2000, there were 761 people, 294 households, and 206 families residing in the town. The population density was 90.3 inhabitants per square mile (34.9/km^{2}). There were 352 housing units at an average density of 41.8 per square mile (16.1/km^{2}). The racial makeup of the town was 69.65% White, 29.04% Black or African American, 0.39% Native American, 0.26% Asian, and 0.66% from two or more races. 0.39% of the population were Hispanic or Latino of any race.

There were 294 households, out of which 32.7% had children under the age of 18 living with them, 51.7% were married couples living together, 13.6% had a female householder with no husband present, and 29.9% were non-families. 25.9% of all households were made up of individuals, and 8.5% had someone living alone who was 65 years of age or older. The average household size was 2.59 and the average family size was 3.12.

In the town, the population was spread out, with 27.5% under the age of 18, 7.5% from 18 to 24, 29.4% from 25 to 44, 23.5% from 45 to 64, and 12.1% who were 65 years of age or older. The median age was 36 years. For every 100 females, there were 101.3 males. For every 100 females age 18 and over, there were 92.3 males.

The median income for a household in the town was $23,027, and the median income for a family was $28,335. Males had a median income of $23,679 versus $18,185 for females. The per capita income for the town was $14,712. About 15.9% of families and 25.6% of the population were below the poverty line, including 28.8% of those under age 18 and 33.3% of those age 65 or over.

== Gallery ==
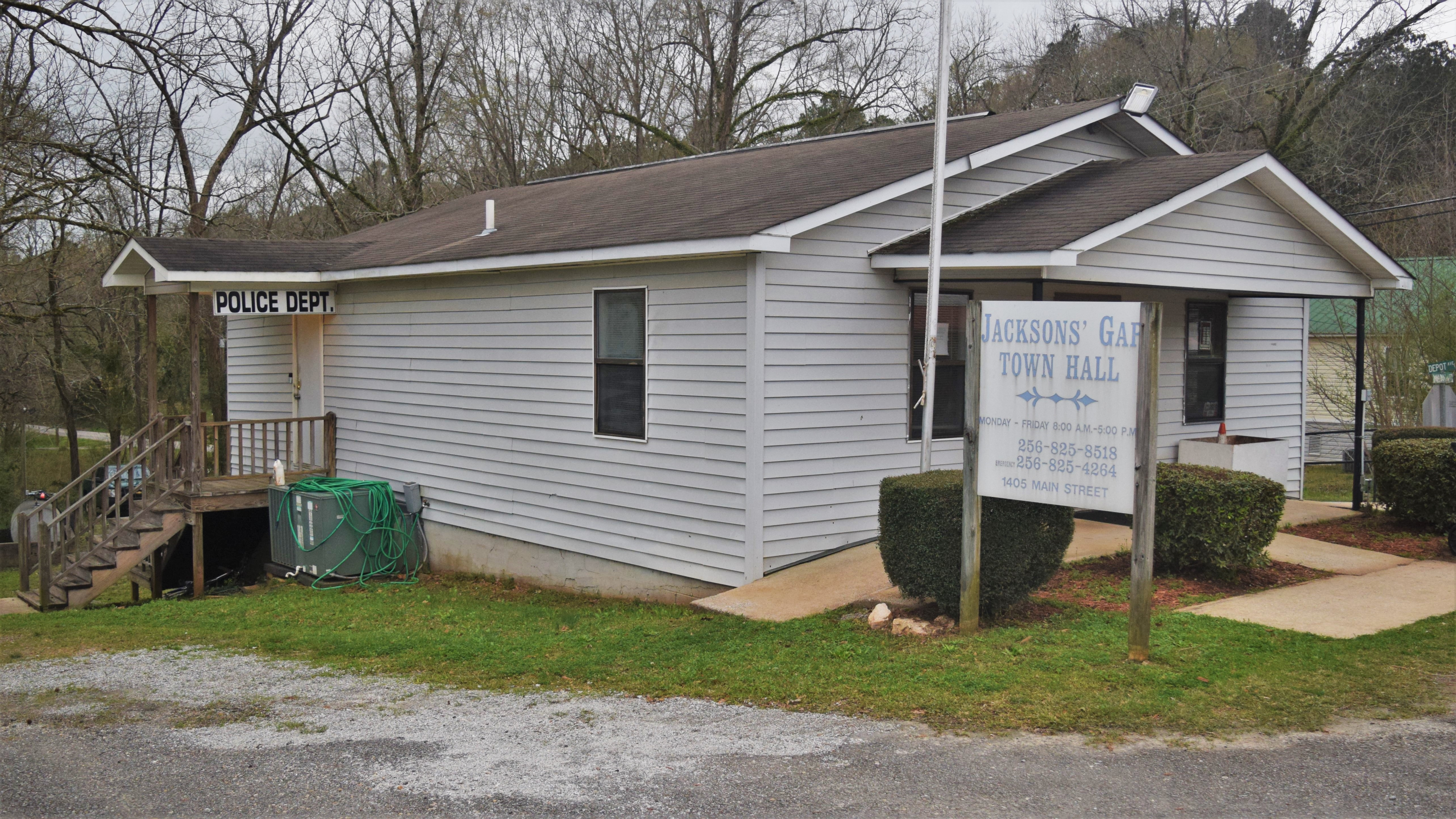
Jackson's Gap Town Hall and Police Station

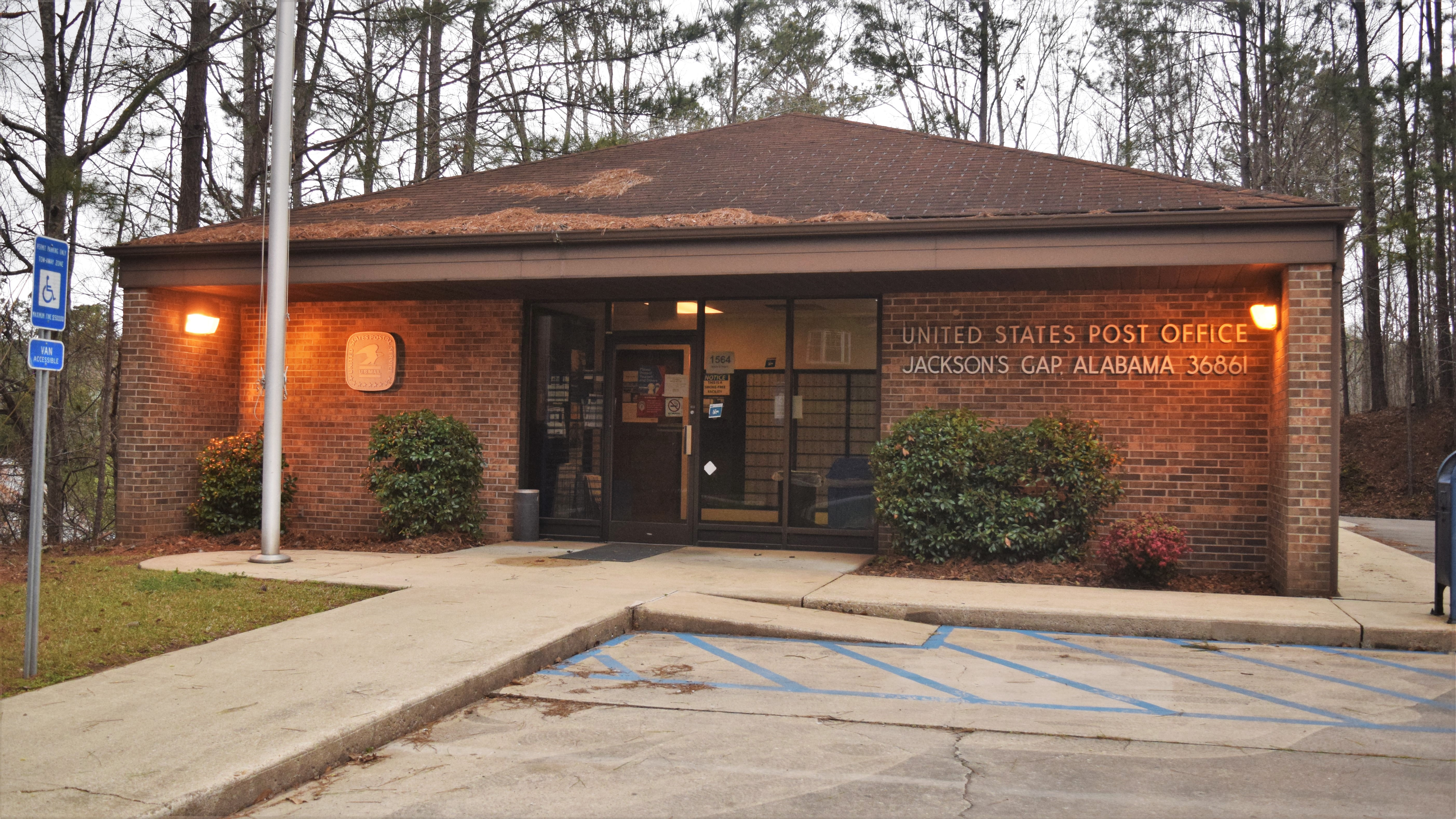
Jackson's Gap Post Office (ZIP code: 36861)

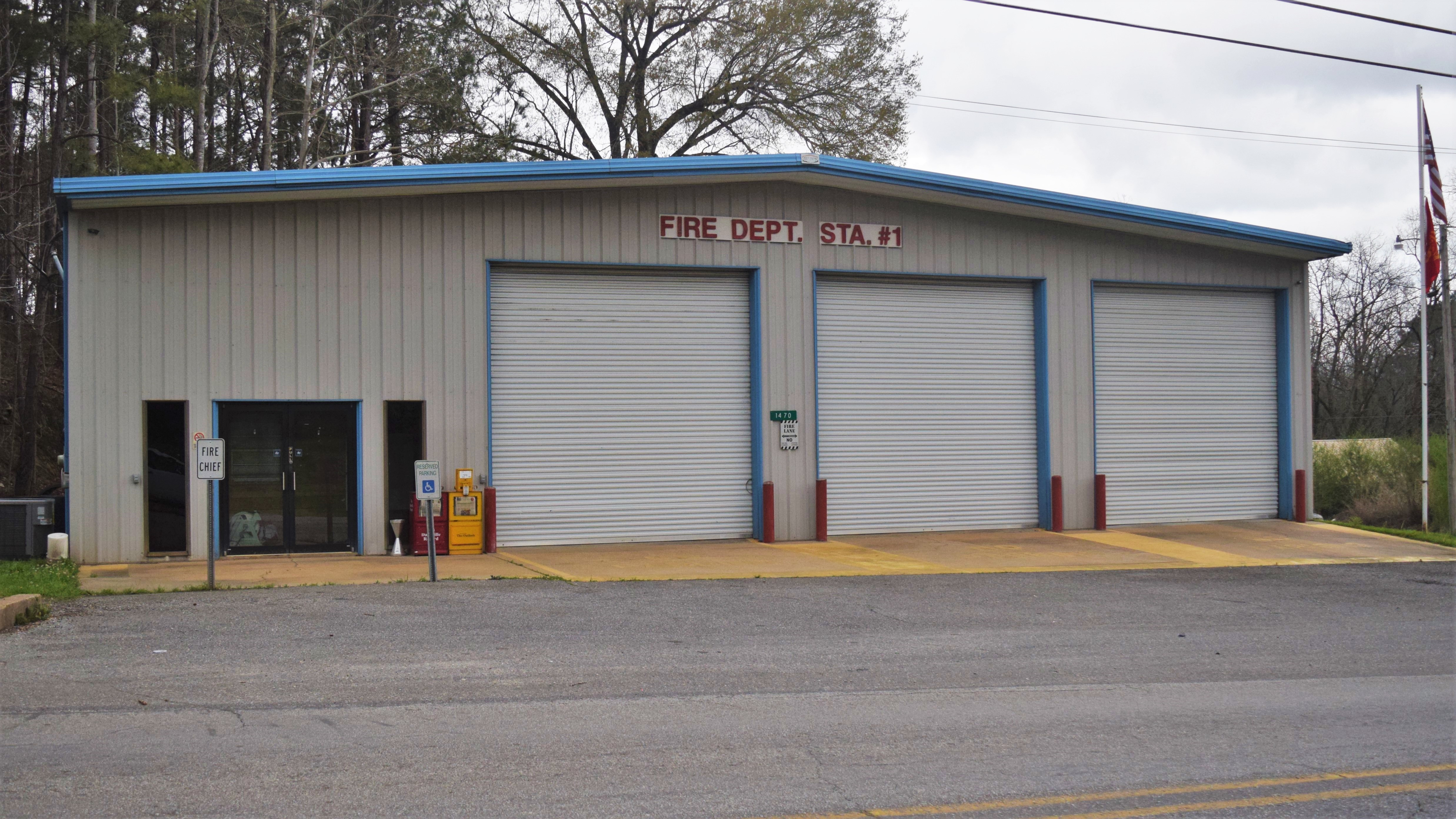
Jackson's Gap Volunteer Fire Department
