= Cherokee Bluffs, Alabama =

- Unincorporated community
- Location within Alabama Location within the United States
- Coordinates: 32°40′55″N 85°54′23″W
- Country: United States
- State: Alabama
- County: Tallapoosa
- Elevation: 561 ft (171 m)
- Time zone: UTC-6 (Central (CST))
  - Summer (DST): UTC-5 (CDT)
- Area codes: 256 & 938
- GNIS feature ID: 115998

Cherokee Bluffs is an unincorporated community in Tallapoosa County, Alabama, United States. The bluffs were a landmark in Tallapoosa County, and they were chosen as the first site on the Tallapoosa River for the creation of a dam and reservoir.

== Background ==
Martin Dam was built at Cherokee Bluffs and completed in 1939. During construction, the community had bathhouses, bunkhouses, a school, commissary, dining hall, recreation hall, camp hospital, and a barber shop. The workers were tested for typhoid fever and malaria, and were not hired if they tested positive for malaria. Local residents were also tested for malaria. Cherokee Bluffs is the birthplace of Roy C. Craven, the founding director of the University Gallery at the University of Florida.
