= Blevins Gap Nature Preserve =

Nature reserve in Alabama, United States

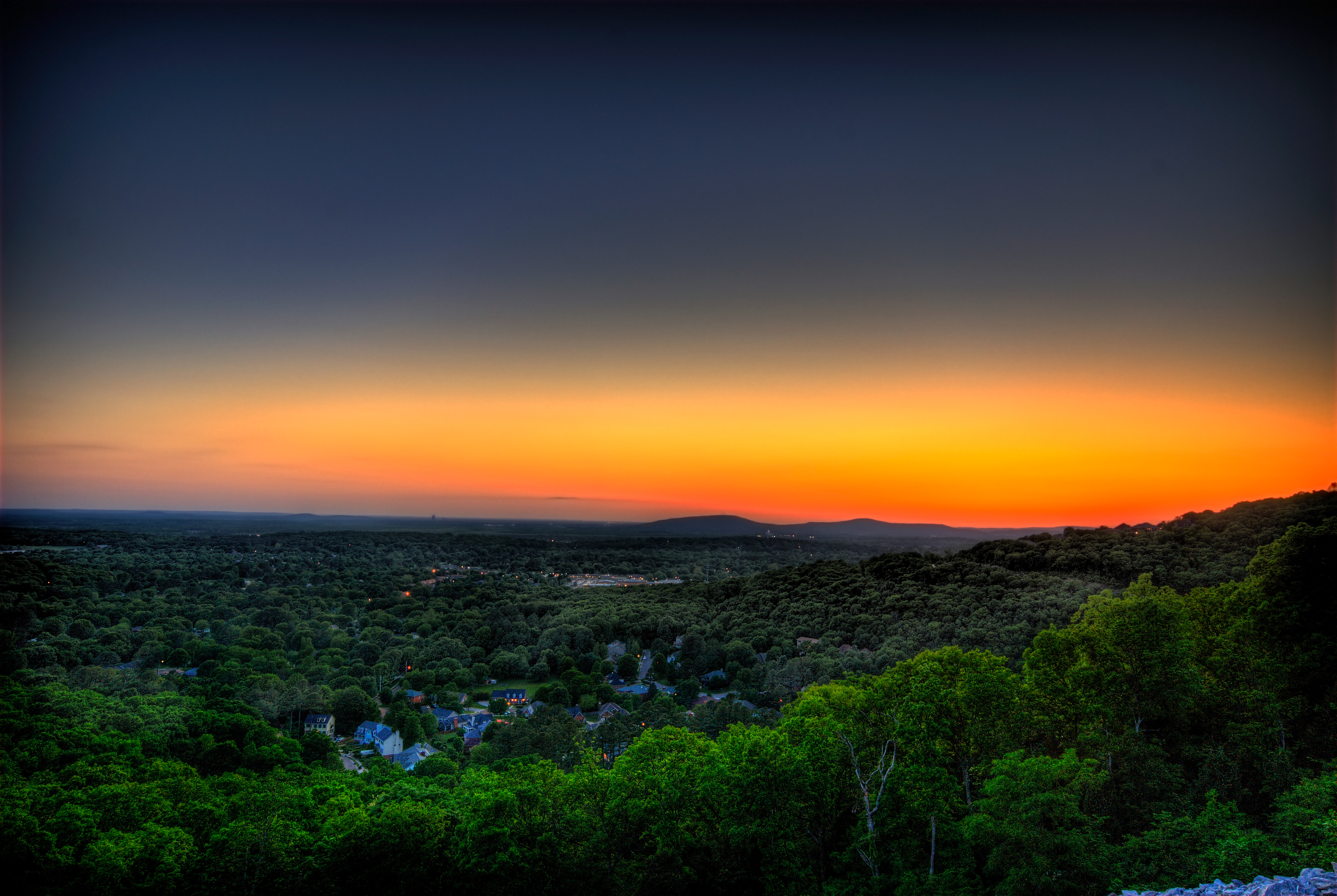
- View from Hampton Cove of the preserve and the surrounding area

- Location within Alabama Location within the United States
- Interactive map of Blevins Gap Nature Preserve
- Type: Nature preserve
- Location: Huntsville, Alabama
- Coordinates: 34°39′26″N 86°31′01″W
- Area: 994 acres (402 ha)
- Operator: Land Trust of North Alabama
- Open: Dawn to dusk
- Designation: National Recreation Trail (Trail system)
- Website: Official website

Blevins Gap Nature Preserve is a nature preserve in southern Huntsville, Alabama. It measures 994 acres (402 ha) in total and contains over 12 miles of trails within its borders. Cecil Ashburn Drive splits the preserve into two parts. The northern section measures 267 acres (108 ha) with 4.5 miles of trails, a rocky incline, and waterfalls. The southern portion measures the remaining 727 acres (294 ha) and contains 8 miles of woodland trails.

The trail system was designated as a National Recreation Trail in 2012.

== History ==
The preserve contains the southernmost remnant of the "Spacewalk Trail", which was constructed by Boy Scouts in the 1960s and ran from Monte Sano State Park to the southern edge of Green Mountain. The northern portion of the preserve, donated in 1988, was the first piece of land ever donated to a land trust in Alabama. The Stevenson Trail and the Fanning Trail, both located within this northern portion, are named after the original donors.

== Flora and fauna ==
Armadillos, bobcats, coyotes, deer, foxes, opossums, raccoons, and turkeys live in the preserve. Plant species include the Alabama snow-wreath, the American smoketree, and the yellow's lady slipper, in addition to the endangered Morefield's leather flower and Price's potato-bean.
