= Weeks Bay National Estuarine Research Reserve =

Protected area of Mobile Bay

Coordinates: 30°23′50″N 87°49′51″W

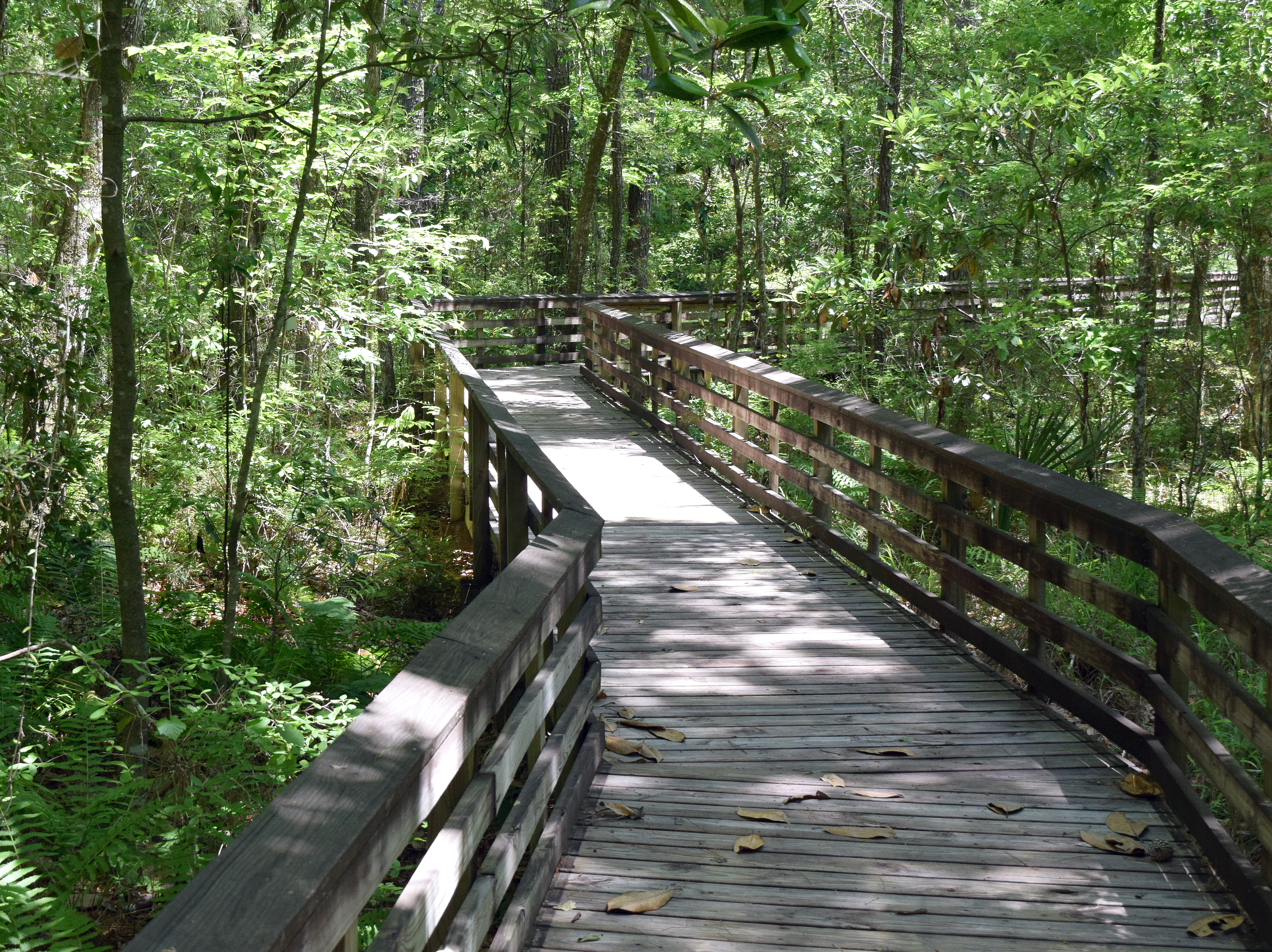
Interpretive trail at Weeks Bay

The Weeks Bay National Estuarine Research Reserve is a field laboratory and research facility along Weeks Bay estuary along the Gulf Coast of the US state of Alabama. It is about 6,000 acres (2,400 ha) in size. It receives freshwater from the Magnolia and Fish Rivers, and drains a 198 square miles (510 km^{2}) watershed into the portion of Mobile Bay via a narrow opening. This sub-estuary of Mobile Bay averages just 4.8 ft (1.5 meters) deep and is fringed with marsh (Spartina, Juncus) and swamp (pine, oak, magnolia, maple, cypress, bayberry, tupelo and others). The reserve lands also include upland and bottomland hardwood forests, freshwater marsh (Typha, Cladium), submerged aquatic vegetation (Ruppia, Vallisneria) and unique bog habitats (Sarracenia, Drosera). Weeks Bay is a critical nursery for shrimp, bay anchovy, blue crab and multitudes of other fish, crustaceans and shellfish that support robust commercial fisheries providing $450 million/year for Alabama.

The Weeks Bay Reserve includes over 6,000 acres (2,400 ha) of coastal wetlands and water bottoms that provide rich and diverse habitats for a variety of fish, crustaceans and shellfish, as well as many unique and rare plants. The Weeks Bay estuary, "where rivers meet the sea," is an important site of scientific research on estuarine ecology. The Weeks Bay Interpretive Center offers the public opportunities to learn about coastal habitats through its exhibit, live animals displays and collections of animals and regional plants. Self-guiding nature trails wind through wetlands, marshes, bogs and forests.

In 2014, the Reserve joined with other conservancy groups to secure a tract of land which now protects the undeveloped marine forests near the bay. The Weeks Bay Foundation is a fully accredited member of The Land Trust Alliance. Weeks Bay was designated part of NOAA's National Estuarine Research Reserve System in 1986. This site is managed by the Alabama Department of Conservation and Natural Resources.
