= Hybart, Alabama =

- Unincorporated community
- Location within Alabama Location within the United States
- Coordinates: 31°49′36″N 87°22′56″W
- Country: United States
- State: Alabama
- County: Monroe
- Elevation: 79 ft (24 m)
- Time zone: UTC-6 (Central (CST))
  - Summer (DST): UTC-5 (CDT)
- ZIP code: 36481
- Area code: 334

Hybart is an unincorporated community in Monroe County, in the U.S. state of Alabama. Hybart (pronounced "Hibbert") is located at 31°49′36″N 87°22′56″W (31.826506, -87.382094). It is located at the intersection of Alabama State Route 41 and Monroe County Road 56, in the northwestern part of Monroe County, just a short distance from its border with Wilcox County, Alabama. Hybart is the host of a locally famous Alabama turkey hunting competition called the Butterball which has appeared in Mobile Bay Magazine. The area is also known for being a good hunting spot for whitetail deer, turkey, quail, dove, and duck. Hybart is on the northwestern edge of the Red Hills region of southwestern Alabama, a hilly, wooded, and still largely undeveloped part of the state, geologically distinct from the Gulf Coastal Plain to its south, and the Black Belt region to its north. Within the Red Hills region, the Forever Wild Land Trust of Alabama owns two large tracts of land a few miles to the southeast of Hybart. Recreational opportunities in these tracts include hunting, woods road hiking/exploration, wildflower viewing, photography, and bird and wildlife watching. The Red Hills tracts are open to visitors year-round.

== History ==
A post office called Hybart was established on June 15, 1926; it would operate for nearly 50 years, until it was closed on May 21, 1976. James Willis Hybart, an early postmaster, gave the community his last name. Prior to being called Hybart, the community was called Vredenburgh Junction (established 1915-1916), as it was located at the intersection of the recently completed Gulf, Florida, and Alabama Railway and the previously existing short line Vredenburgh Saw Mill Company Railroad; the Vredenburgh Saw Mill Company Railroad had been completed a few years prior, and ran to the nearby sawmill community of Vredenburgh, Alabama, located about four miles (six kilometers) east of Hybart. The Gulf, Florida, and Alabama Railway fell into receivership in 1917, but would continue to operate until it was acquired by the Muscle Shoals, Birmingham, and Pensacola Railway in 1922. In 1924 the Muscle Shoals, Birmingham, and Pensacola Railway would itself fall into receivership, and in the following year would be acquired by the St. Louis-San Francisco Railway (known as the "Frisco"), who would operate it until 1980, when Burlington Northern Railroad acquired Frisco. Frisco offered passenger service through Hybart on its "Pensacola Special", that ran from Pensacola, Florida, to Memphis Tennessee, via Amory, Mississippi; passenger service was eventually discontinued on February 1, 1955. The railway is currently owned by the Alabama and Gulf Coast Railway. Mr. Hybart had previously operated a store at the nearby community and steamboat stop of Bell's Landing, Alabama (which no longer exists), located a few miles southwest of Hybart on a bluff on the east bank of the Alabama River. Local lore has it that sometime in the mid 1920s, Mr. Hybart, who also operated the only general store in Vredenburgh Junction, persuaded the local Frisco train agent to change the name to Hybart by offering the agent a free hat. Another local legend has it that the words "Vredenburgh Junction" would not fit on a standard postmark stamp and thus another name had to be chosen for the post office for this community. The first known map reference to "Hybart" is from the 1928 Post Route Map of Alabama.

Passenger train at the Hybart depot of the St. Louis-San Francisco Railway in 1954. The depot was torn down in the early 1970s.

== Notable people ==
Hybart is the hometown of former United States Senator from Alabama, and former Attorney General of the United States, Jeff Sessions, whose father ran a small country store in the community for many years. It is also home to local folk artist and equestrian Leroyal Finklea.
