= Sterrett, Alabama =

- Census-designated place
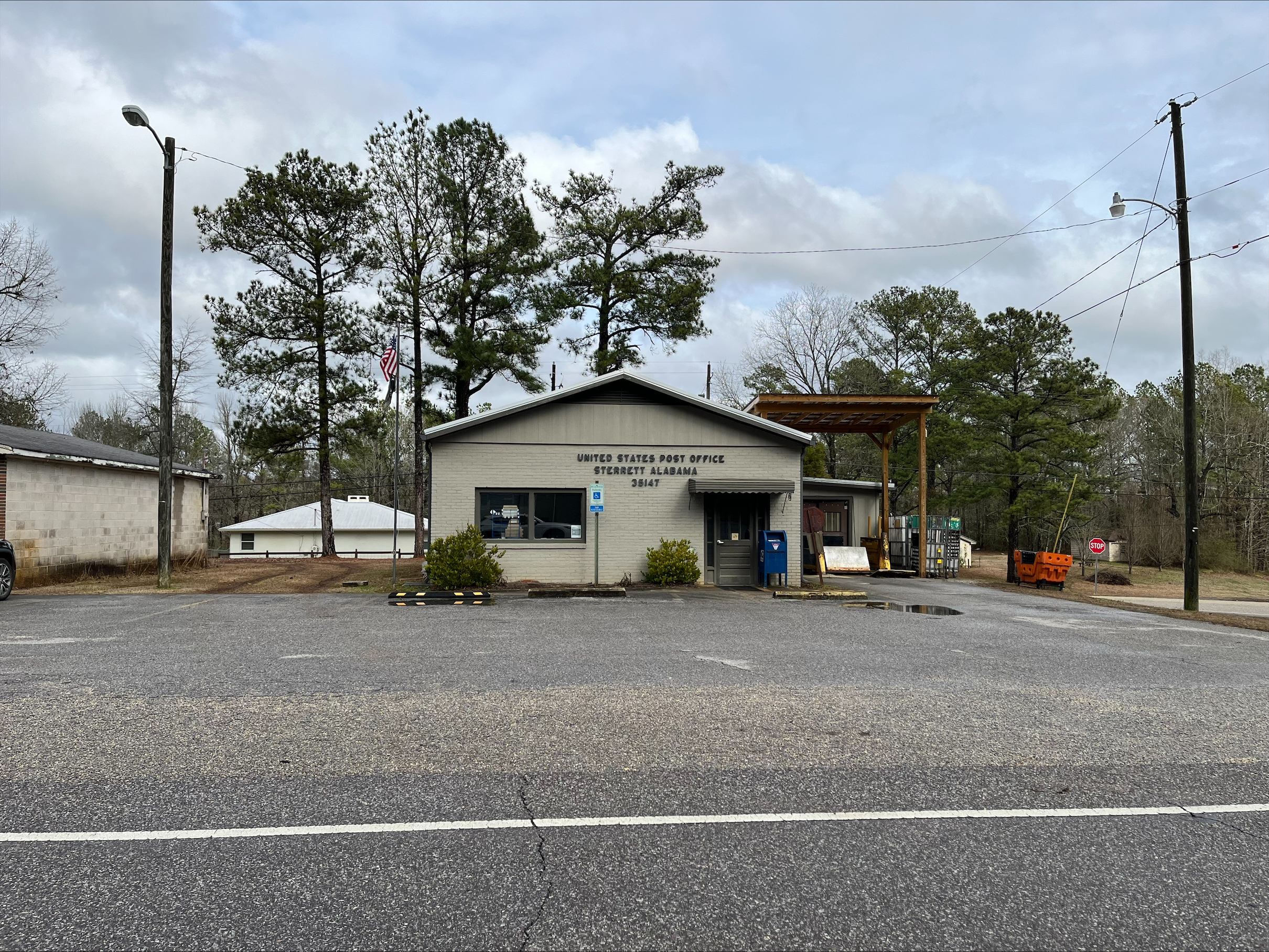
- Sterrett Post Office

- Location of Sterrett in Shelby County, Alabama.
- Coordinates: 33°26′57″N 86°28′48″W
- Country: United States
- State: Alabama
- County: Shelby

Area
  - Total: 23.57 sq mi (61.05 km^{2})
  - Land: 22.92 sq mi (59.37 km^{2})
  - Water: 0.65 sq mi (1.68 km^{2})
- Elevation: 482 ft (147 m)

Population (2020)
  - Total: 706
  - Density: 30.8/sq mi (11.89/km^{2})
- Time zone: UTC-6 (Central (CST))
  - Summer (DST): UTC-5 (CDT)
- ZIP code: 35147
- Area codes: 205, 659
- GNIS feature ID: 2582702

Sterrett is a census-designated place and unincorporated community in Shelby County, Alabama, United States. As of the 2020 census, Sterrett had a population of 706.

== History ==
Sterrett was named in honor of a prominent local family, which included Alphonso A. Sterrett, who served in the Alabama Legislature. At one point in its history, Sterrett was a center of pottery production in central Alabama. Also known as Jugtown, Sterrett was once home to at least ten potters. The pottery produced here was classified as being part of the East Alabama style of pottery, which used high quality clay and a two-toned glaze decoration. William Hilliard Falkner purchased the Sterrett Pottery Works in 1874 and operated it until 1903. His father, Joel Falkner, was also a potter in Sterrett.

Sterrett was once home to Twin Pines Conference Center, which was founded by Robert "Bob" Saunders. The Bob Saunders Family Covered Bridge is located on the property of the former conference center and is listed in the World Guide to Covered Bridges.

== Geography ==
The community is in the northeastern part of Shelby County. Alabama State Route 25 runs through the community, leading southeast 7 mi (11 km) to Vincent and northwest 13 mi (21 km) on a particularly winding and mountainous route to the city of Leeds.

== Demographics ==
Historical population
Census	Pop.	Note	%±
2010	712		—
2020	706		−0.8%
U.S. Decennial Census

Sterrett was first listed as a census designated place in the 2010 U.S. census.

Sterrett CDP, Alabama – Racial and ethnic composition Note: the US Census treats Hispanic/Latino as an ethnic category. This table excludes Latinos from the racial categories and assigns them to a separate category. Hispanics/Latinos may be of any race.
Race / Ethnicity (NH = Non-Hispanic)	Pop 2010	Pop 2020	% 2010	% 2020
White alone (NH)	674	650	94.66%	92.07%
Black or African American alone (NH)	28	20	3.93%	2.83%
Native American or Alaska Native alone (NH)	0	1	0.00%	0.14%
Asian alone (NH)	0	0	0.00%	0.00%
Native Hawaiian or Pacific Islander alone (NH)	0	0	0.00%	0.00%
Other race alone (NH)	0	0	0.00%	0.00%
Mixed race or Multiracial (NH)	5	22	0.70%	3.12%
Hispanic or Latino (any race)	5	13	0.70%	1.84%
Total	712	706	100.00%	100.00%
