= Alabama State Route 194 =

State highway in Alabama, United States

State Route 194
- SR 194 highlighted in red

Route information
- Maintained by ALDOT
- Length: 1.9 mi (3.1 km)
- Existed: 1987–1995

Major junctions
- West end: SR 51
- SR 198
- East end: SR 51 / SR 239

Location
- Country: United States
- State: Alabama
- Counties: Barbour

Highway system
- Alabama State Highway System; Interstate; US; State
← SR 193	→ SR 195

State Route 194 (SR 194) was a 1.9-mile-long (3.1 km) route that ran through Clayton, Barbour County, Alabama.

== Route description ==
The western terminus of SR 194 was located at its intersection with SR 51 in Clayton. From this point, the route traveled east, and then northerly direction as it gone through downtown Clayton. As the route approached its terminus at SR 51, it intersects modern day SR 198 in a roundabout in Downtown Clayton. Then after it headed north then westbound to its terminus at SR 51 and SR 239.

== History ==
SR 194 originated as a state highway designation for Elm Street from Wilson Avenue (then SR 193) to US 43 in Prichard, which was decommissioned in 1981 along with SR 193 (which was relocated elsewhere in 1985). The number was used again as renumbering of SR 51 Business through Clayton by 1987. It was renumbered by 1995 as an extension of SR 239.

== Major intersections ==
The entire route is in Clayton, Barbour County.

mi	km	Destinations	Notes
0.000	0.000	SR 51 (W Louisville Avenue/Western Bypass) – Louisville, Midway	Western terminus
		SR 198 east (Eufaula Avenue)	Western terminus of SR 198
1.9	3.1	SR 51 (Western Bypass) / SR 239 north – Louisville, Union Springs, Midway	Eastern terminus; then southern terminus of SR 239
1.000 mi = 1.609 km; 1.000 km = 0.621 mi
