= Alabama State Route 30 =

State highway in Alabama, United States

State Route 30

Route information
- Maintained by ALDOT
- Length: 19.012 mi (30.597 km)
- Existed: 1957–present

Major junctions
- West end: SR 51 near Clayton
- SR 239 at Clayton; SR 198 at Clayton
- East end: US 431 near Eufaula

Location
- Country: United States
- State: Alabama
- Counties: Barbour

Highway system
- Alabama State Highway System; Interstate; US; State
← US 29	→ US 31

State Route 30 (SR 30) is a 19.012-mile-long (30.597 km) state highway in Barbour County in the southeastern part of the U.S. state of Alabama, The western terminus of the highway is at an intersection with SR 51 at Clayton. The route continues until its intersection with U.S. Route 431 (US 431) south of Eufaula.

== Route description ==
SR 30 is routed along a two-lane roadway for its entire length. It serves as a connector route between Clayton, the county seat of Barbour County, and Eufaula, the county’s largest city and primary center of retail. Between the two cities, the highway travels through rural areas with no cities or towns. After intersecting two minor state routes at Clayton, the highway does not intersect any other state routes or U.S. highways until its terminus south of Eufaula.

== Major intersections ==
The entire route is in Barbour County.

Location	mi	km	Destinations	Notes
Clayton	0.000	0.000	SR 51 – Louisville	Western terminus
Clayton	0.309	0.497	SR 239 north – Clayton, Midway	Southern terminus of SR 239
Clayton	2.010	3.235	SR 198 west – Clayton	Eastern terminus of SR 198
Eufaula	19.012	30.597	US 431 (SR 1) – Eufaula, Phenix City, Dothan	Eastern terminus
1.000 mi = 1.609 km; 1.000 km = 0.621 mi
