= Alabama State Route 131 =

Highway in Alabama

State Route 131

Route information
- Maintained by ALDOT
- Length: 27.124 mi (43.652 km)

Major junctions
- West end: SR 10 near Blue Springs
- East end: US 431 in Eufaula

Location
- Country: United States
- State: Alabama
- Counties: Barbour

Highway system
- Alabama State Highway System; Interstate; US; State
← SR 130	→ SR 132

State Route 131 (SR 131) is a 27-mile-long (43 km) east–west state highway located entirely within Barbour County, Alabama. The route serves as the main road in Bakerhill.

== Route description ==
The road starts near Blue Springs at SR 10. The road has no major junctions, and the only junctions are minor county routes. The route goes past Bakerhill and then ends at U.S. Route 431 (US 431), the whole route is basically used as a shortcut between Clio and Blue Springs to the major town of Eufaula.

== Major intersections ==
The entire route is in Barbour County.

Location	mi	km	Destinations	Notes
Clio	0.000	0.000	SR 10 – Clio, Abbeville	
Eufaula	27.124	43.652	US 431 (SR 1) – Eufaula, Abbeville	
1.000 mi = 1.609 km; 1.000 km = 0.621 mi
