= Easterling Correctional Facility =

Prison in Alabama, United States

- Location in Alabama
- Location: 200 Wallace Drive Clio, Alabama; 31°41′22″N 85°35′08″W
- Status: open
- Security class: mixed
- Capacity: 1,267
- Opened: 1990
- Managed by: Alabama Department of Corrections

Easterling Correctional Facility is a state prison for men located in Clio, Barbour County, Alabama. The facility has an operating capacity of 1,267 and was first opened in 1990.

== See also ==
- The Alabama Solution, a 2025 documentary filmed in the facility
