= Don Sutton =

American baseball player (1945–2021)

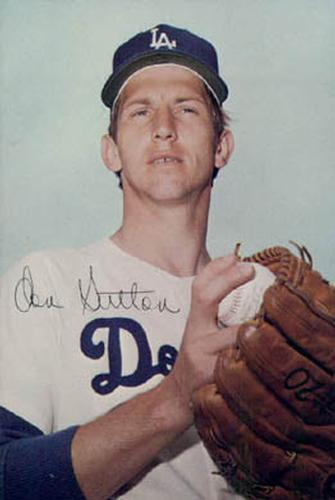
- Sutton with the Los Angeles Dodgers, c. 1971
- Pitcher
- Born: April 2, 1945; Clio, Alabama, U.S.
- Died: January 19, 2021 (aged 75); Rancho Mirage, California, U.S.
- Batted: Right Threw: Right

MLB debut
- April 14, 1966, for the Los Angeles Dodgers

Last MLB appearance
- August 9, 1988, for the Los Angeles Dodgers

MLB statistics
- Win–loss record: 324–256
- Earned run average: 3.26
- Strikeouts: 3,574
- Stats at Baseball Reference

Teams
- Los Angeles Dodgers (1966–1980); Houston Astros (1981–1982); Milwaukee Brewers (1982–1984); Oakland Athletics (1985); California Angels (1985–1987); Los Angeles Dodgers (1988)

Career highlights and awards
- 4× All-Star (1972, 1973, 1975, 1977); MLB ERA leader (1980); Los Angeles Dodgers No. 20 retired; Milwaukee Brewers Wall of Honor; Braves Hall of Fame

Member of the National

Baseball Hall of Fame
- Induction: 1998
- Vote: 81.6% (fifth ballot)

Donald Howard Sutton (April 2, 1945 – January 19, 2021) was an American professional baseball pitcher who played 23 seasons in Major League Baseball (MLB), primarily for the Los Angeles Dodgers. Sutton won a total of 324 games, pitched 58 shutouts including five one-hitters and ten two-hitters, and led the National League in walks plus hits per inning pitched (WHIP) four times. He is seventh on baseball's all-time strikeout list with 3,574.

Sutton was born in Clio, Alabama. He attended high school and college in Florida before entering professional baseball. After a year in the minor leagues, Sutton joined the Dodgers. Beginning in 1966, he was in the team's starting pitching rotation with Sandy Koufax, Don Drysdale, and Claude Osteen. Sixteen of Sutton's 23 MLB seasons were spent with the Dodgers. He spent much of the 1980s with the Houston Astros, the Milwaukee Brewers, the Oakland Athletics and the California Angels, before returning for a second stint with the Dodgers. He registered only one 20-win season, but earned 10 or more wins in every season except 1983 and 1988.

Sutton became a television sports broadcaster after his retirement as a player. He worked in this capacity for several teams, the majority being with the Atlanta Braves. Sutton was inducted into the Baseball Hall of Fame in 1998.

== Early life ==
Sutton was born in Clio, Alabama, a small town in Barbour County, on April 2, 1945, the same day as future Dodger teammate Reggie Smith. He was born to sharecroppers at the end of World War II, in a tarpaper shack. At the time Sutton was born, his father was 18 and his mother was 15. Sutton's father, Howard, gave him the strong work ethic which he carried throughout his career. His father tried logging and construction work, and in looking for work, moved the family to Molino, Florida, just north of Pensacola. Sutton and his family were Evangelical Christians.

Sutton attended J. M. Tate High School where he played baseball, basketball, and football. He led his baseball team to the small-school state finals two years in row, winning his junior year, 1962, and losing 2–1 in his senior year, and was named all-county, all-conference, and all-state for both of those seasons. He graduated in 1963 and was voted "Most Likely to Succeed". He wanted to attend the University of Florida, but coach Dave Fuller was not interested. He attended Gulf Coast Community College for one year, and then Whittier College. After a good summer league, he was signed by the Dodgers.

== Baseball career ==
=== Los Angeles Dodgers ===
After playing for the Sioux Falls Packers in South Dakota, Sutton entered the major leagues at 21. His major league debut came with the Dodgers on April 14, 1966. On the 1966 Dodgers, Sutton was the fourth starting pitcher in a rotation that included Sandy Koufax, Don Drysdale, and Claude Osteen. He later said that the "best thing that could have happened to me was to join a team with Drysdale and Koufax. They were obviously helpful to me as a pitcher." He struck out 209 batters that season, which was the highest strikeout total for a rookie since 1911. Sutton was passed over in Game 4 of the 1966 World Series, giving Drysdale a second start. Though the Baltimore Orioles did start a rookie in the World Series, future Hall of Famer, Jim Palmer, Sutton did not pitch and the Dodgers were swept in four games by the Orioles.

Sutton was selected to the Major League Baseball All-Star Game four times in the 1970s. The 1974 Dodgers made the postseason after winning 102 games during the regular season. They defeated the Pittsburgh Pirates in the playoffs and Sutton accounted for two of the team's three wins. They lost the 1974 World Series four games to one, with Sutton earning the only win for the team. In 1976, Sutton had his best major league season, finishing the year with a 21–10 win–loss record. He was the National League's starting pitcher and MVP of the 1977 Major League Baseball All-Star Game at Yankee Stadium. He earned a complete game win in the 1977 playoffs, followed by a 1–0 record in two appearances in that year's World Series, which the team lost to the Yankees.

In August 1978, Sutton captured media attention after a physical altercation with teammate Steve Garvey. Sutton had criticized what he thought was excessive media attention paid to Garvey, saying that Reggie Smith was really the team's best player. When Garvey confronted Sutton about the comments before a game against the Mets, they fought and had to be separated by teammates and team officials. The team returned to the postseason that year. Sutton had a 15–11 record during the regular season, but he struggled in the postseason as the Dodgers lost the World Series to New York again. In 17 postseason innings that year, Sutton gave up 14 earned runs.

=== Later career ===
Los Angeles made Sutton a free agent after the 1980 season. During his time in Los Angeles, he set a team record for career wins.

Sutton was selected by ten teams in the 1980 free agent re-entry draft. He was courted by both the Yankees and Astros but ultimately selected Houston. One factor in Houston's favor was that Sutton would be able to play in the pitcher-friendly Astrodome.

After the 1981 player strike interrupted the season, Sutton returned with seven wins and one loss. In an October 2 loss to the Dodgers, Sutton left the game with a patellar fracture, ending his season just as the Astros were about to clinch a berth in the NL postseason.

Prior to the 1982 season, Sutton expressed a desire to return to play in Southern California, where he continued to live. The team did not grant his request and, in August, the Astros sent Sutton to the Milwaukee Brewers for Kevin Bass, Frank DiPino, and Mike Madden. Astros player Ray Knight was critical of the trade, saying, "My first reaction to this trade is disbelief. I don't know who are the prospects we are getting, but I would think Don Sutton would bring a big name, a real big name. Here's a guy who is going to win you 15–20 games every year, and he never misses a start... He should really help the Brewers." Sutton earned a win in a 1982 playoff game against the Angels, then started two games in the 1982 World Series against the St. Louis Cardinals. He pitched 10 innings in the series, gave up nine earned runs and was charged with one loss.

In 1983, Sutton had a down year for the Brewers, notching only 8 wins, his lowest full season total to date, and having an ERA of 4.08, the second highest of his career. His record and ERA improved in 1984 to 14–12 and 3.77.

In 1985, Sutton was traded to the Oakland Athletics in exchange for Ray Burris. He was reluctant to report to the team, as he was hoping to play for a team in Southern California so that he could live at home with his family. Sutton ultimately reported to Oakland 12 days late for spring training. He said that he had his family's approval in the decision and he mentioned his win total – he was 20 wins shy of 300 career wins – as a factor in the decision. After starting the season with a 13–8 record, Sutton was traded to the California Angels in September. In return, the Angels would send two minor league players to be named later to Oakland, Robert Sharpnack and Jerome Nelson.

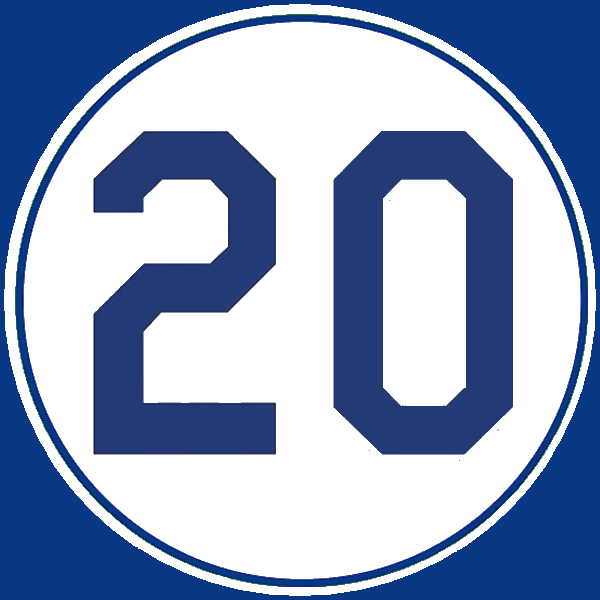
Don Sutton's number 20 was retired by the Los Angeles Dodgers in 1998.

Coming into the 1986 season, Sutton had 295 career victories. He struggled early in the season, recording a 9.12 ERA in his first five starts, but earned his 300th career win on June 18, pitching a complete game against the Texas Rangers in which he allowed only three hits and one run while striking out Gary Ward for the final out of the game. He appeared in two games in the 1986 ALCS against the Boston Red Sox, earning a 1.86 ERA but registering two no-decisions.

Sutton signed with the Dodgers again in 1988. Before the 1988 season began, Angels pitcher John Candelaria criticized him for tipping off police that Candelaria was drinking the previous year, leading to one of Candelaria's two 1987 drunk driving arrests. Sutton said that he made the report out of concern for Candelaria's safety; Candelaria said that Sutton was practicing "self-preservation" and attempting to have Candelaria removed from the Angels' starting rotation since Sutton was not pitching well.

In August 1988, Sutton spoke with Astros team leadership about a vacant assistant general manager position with the team. Dodgers executive vice president Fred Claire said that Sutton violated league rules by discussing such a position while under contract with a team, but Sutton said that he ran into Astros general manager Bill Wood at a game and simply mentioned his willingness to discuss the position later. The team released him on August 10. Claire said that Sutton's stamina was a major consideration in the move, as the team was looking for pitchers who could last more than five or six innings per start.

Sutton holds the record for most at-bats without a home run (1,354). Sutton retains another record: seven times he pitched nine scoreless innings but got a no-decision. He also holds the major league record for most consecutive losses to one team (13 to the Chicago Cubs). Sutton also holds the Dodger franchise record for wins (233) and held the strikeouts record (2,696) for 42 years until he was passed by Clayton Kershaw in 2022.

As a hitter, Sutton was about average as pitchers go, posting a .144 batting average (195-for-1354) with 64 runs batted in and 60 walks. Defensively, he was above average, recording a .968 fielding percentage which was 15 points higher than the league average at his position.

== Broadcasting career ==
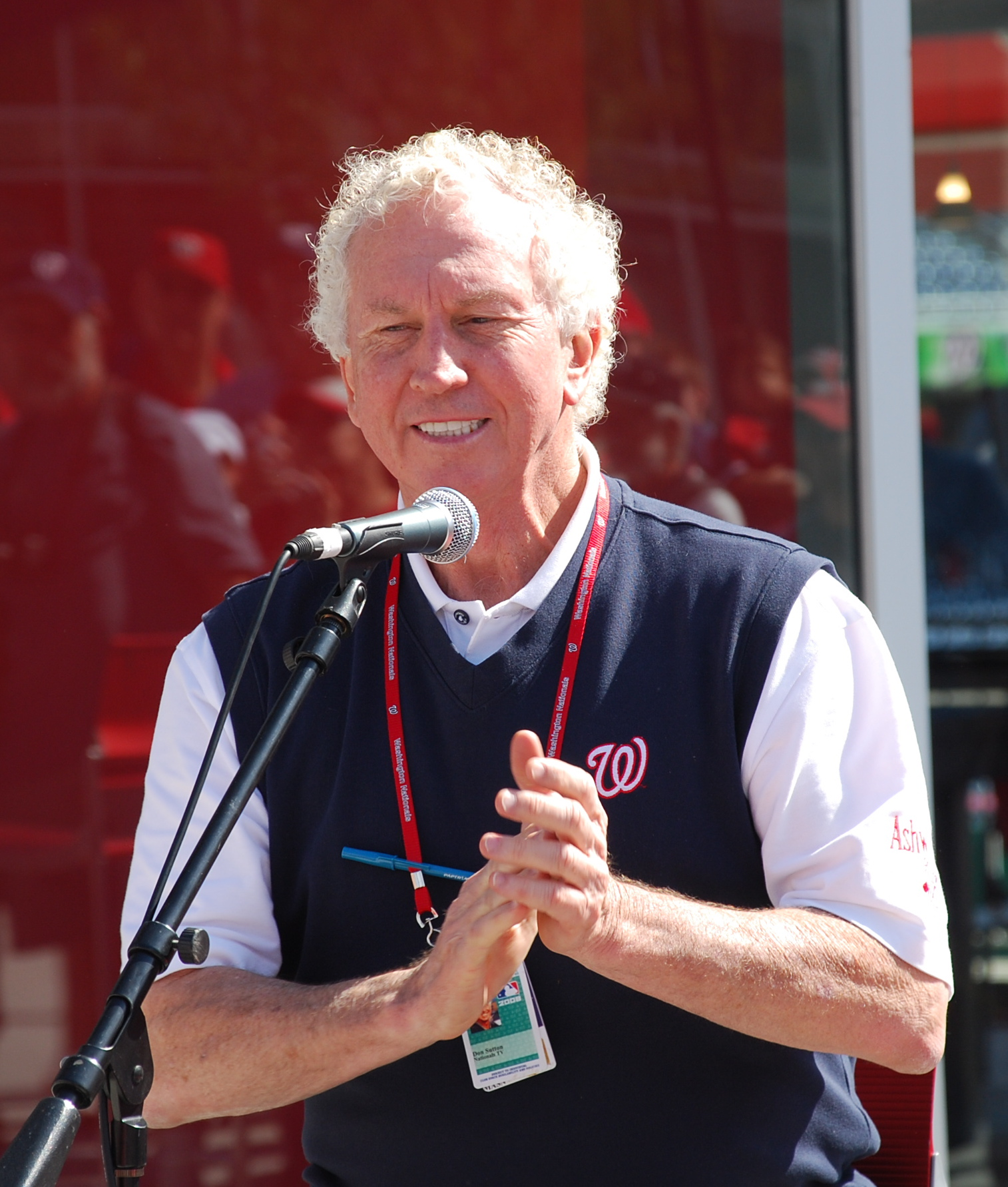
Sutton with the Washington Nationals in 2008

Sutton started his broadcasting career in 1989, splitting duties between Dodgers cable telecasts on Z Channel and Atlanta Braves telecasts on TBS.

The following year, he became a full-time commentator for the Braves. In 2002, Sutton was diagnosed with kidney cancer resulting in the removal of his left kidney. In addition, part of his lung was removed in 2003. While undergoing cancer treatment, he continued his broadcasting career. He left TBS after the 2006 season, mainly because the network would broadcast fewer games in 2007 and had to cut back on the number of broadcasters.

Sutton was a color commentator for the Washington Nationals on the MASN network during the 2007 and 2008 seasons. After the end of the 2008 season, Sutton still had two years left on his contract with the Nationals, but when an Atlanta Braves radio job opened up, he negotiated his release on January 27, 2009, in order to return to Atlanta, where he had many ties. His most recent broadcast partner was Jim Powell, who joined the Braves Radio Network in 2009. Sutton missed the 2019 season due to a broken femur. He was unable to return to his broadcast career before his death.

== Honors ==
In 1989, Sutton was inducted into the National High School Hall of Fame. In 1997, he appeared on the National Baseball Hall of Fame ballot for the fourth time. Sutton had previously expressed his desire to be elected to the Hall of Fame. However, when he fell nine votes short of election that year, he said that the vote was not that important. When he received the results of the vote, his two-month-old daughter Jacqueline was in an Atlanta neonatal intensive care unit after she was born 16 weeks early. His daughter later recovered. On the 1998 ballot, Sutton became the only player selected for induction, receiving votes on 81.6% of ballots. The Dodgers retired his number that year.

Sutton was inducted into the Braves Hall of Fame in July 2015 for his work as a broadcaster. He became the fourth Braves broadcaster to be honored in this fashion, joining his mentors Ernie Johnson, Skip Caray, and Pete Van Wieren.

A section of U.S. Highway 29, the main route for drivers leaving Pensacola north into Alabama, is named "Don Sutton Highway", and a youth baseball complex in Molino, FL (near his childhood home of Cantonment, FL) also bears his name.

== Personal life ==
Sutton was married twice: with his first wife Patti, he had two children: son Daron (b. 1969) and daughter Staci (b. 1973). With his second wife Mary, he had a daughter Jaqueline (b. 1996). His son Daron was also a broadcaster and has served as a television host or play-by-play announcer for five different Major League Baseball organizations: the Atlanta Braves, Milwaukee Brewers, Arizona Diamondbacks, Los Angeles Angels and Los Angeles Dodgers.

Sutton was an avid golfer and wine enthusiast and frequently made references to those hobbies while broadcasting. Sutton also broadcast golf and served as a pre- and post-game analyst for NBC's coverage of the 1983 and 1987 American League Championship Series. Sutton previously served as a color commentator for NBC's coverage of the 1979 National League Championship Series. He was also a fan of the game show Match Game, even appearing as a panelist on sporadic occasions from 1976 to 1980.

== Death ==
Sutton died of cancer on January 19, 2021, at age 75, at his home in Rancho Mirage, California.

== See also ==
- List of Major League Baseball annual ERA leaders
- List of Major League Baseball career wins leaders
- List of Major League Baseball career strikeout leaders
- List of Major League Baseball career shutout leaders
- List of Major League Baseball retired numbers

Awards and achievements
Preceded by Bill Singer	Los Angeles Dodgers Opening Day; Starting pitcher 1972–1978	Succeeded by Burt Hooton
Preceded by Joe Torre	Major League Player of the Month; April 1972	Succeeded by Bob Watson
