= Alabama State Route 239 =

State highway in Alabama, United States

State Route 239

Route information
- Maintained by ALDOT
- Length: 24.311 mi (39.125 km)

Major junctions
- South end: SR 30 in Clayton
- SR 51 in Clayton
- North end: US 29 in Aberfoil

Location
- Country: United States
- State: Alabama
- Counties: Bullock, Barbour

Highway system
- Alabama State Highway System; Interstate; US; State
← SR 237	→ SR 241

State Route 239 (SR 239) is a 24-mile-long (39 km) route that serves as a connection between SR 30 at Clayton with U.S. Route 29 (US 29) in Aberfoil.

== Route description ==
The southern terminus of SR 239 is located at its intersection with SR 30. It heads north through Clayton where it meets SR 51 and SR 198. From there, the route travels in a westerly direction before making a turn to the northwest near the county line en route to its northern terminus at its intersection with US 29 in Aberfoil, but not before a connecting road to southbound US 29.

== Major intersections ==
County	Location	mi	km	Destinations	Notes
Barbour	Clayton	0.000	0.000	SR 30 (Southern Bypass) – Eufaula	Southern terminus
Barbour	Clayton	0.199	0.320	SR 51 (Louisville Avenue/Western Bypass) – Louisville, Midway	
Barbour	Clayton	1.019	1.640	SR 198 east (Eufaula Avenue)	Western terminus of SR 198
Barbour	Clayton	2.115	3.404	SR 51 (Western Bypass) – Louisville, Midway	
Bullock	Aberfoil	24.311	39.125	US 29 (SR 15) – Banks, Union Springs	Northern terminus
1.000 mi = 1.609 km; 1.000 km = 0.621 mi
