= Robert H. Bennett =

American politician

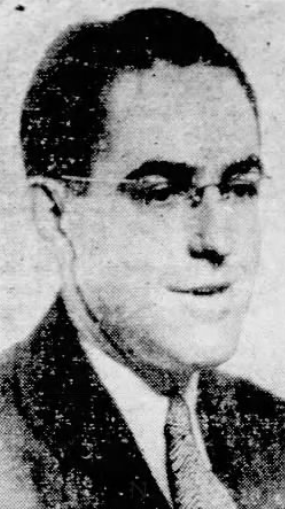
- Bennett in 1943

Member of the Alabama House of Representatives from Barbour County
- In office 1942–1946
- Preceded by: Charles E. Wingham
- Succeeded by: George Wallace

Personal details
- Born: Robert Harris Bennett; September 24, 1913 Louisville, Alabama, U.S.
- Died: January 25, 1991 (aged 77) Troy, Alabama, U.S.
- Party: Democratic
- Education: Harvard College; University of Alabama School of Law

Robert Harris Bennett (September 24, 1913 – January 25, 1991) was an American politician. A member of the Democratic Party, he served in the Alabama House of Representatives from 1942 to 1946.

== Life and career ==
Bennett was born in Louisville, Alabama, the son of Benjamin and Carrie Bennett. He attended and graduated from Harvard College. After graduating, he attended the University of Alabama School of Law, earning his law degree in 1937, which after earning his degree, he worked as an attorney in Barbour County, Alabama.

Bennett served in the Alabama House of Representatives from 1942 to 1946. During his service in the House, in 1944, he ran as a Democratic candidate for United States representative from the Alabama's 3rd district. He received 514 votes, but lost in the Democratic primary election to candidate George W. Andrews, who won with 7,849 votes.

== Death ==
Bennett died on January 25, 1991, at the Edge Regional Medical Center in Troy, Alabama, at the age of 77.
