= Batesville, Alabama =

Unincorporated community in Alabama, United States

- Unincorporated community
- Location within Alabama Location within the United States
- Coordinates: 32°00′33″N 85°18′40″W
- Country: United States
- State: Alabama
- County: Barbour
- Elevation: 269 ft (82 m)
- Time zone: UTC-6 (Central (CST))
  - Summer (DST): UTC-5 (CDT)
- Area code: 334
- GNIS feature ID: 156034

Batesville is an unincorporated community in Barbour County, Alabama, United States.

== History ==
Batesville was named after the plantation of William Michael Bates, who moved to the area from South Carolina in 1845. A post office operated under the name Batesville from 1854 to 1942.

Fort Browder, a small wooden fort, was built near Batesville to use as protection during the Creek War of 1836. Company D of the 15th Regiment Alabama Infantry was organized here and known as the "Fort Browder Roughs."
