= 1998 Baseball Hall of Fame balloting =

Elections to the Baseball Hall of Fame

National Baseball

Hall of Fame and Museum
- New inductees: 5
- via BBWAA: 1
- via Veterans Committee: 4
- Total inductees: 237
- Induction date: July 26, 1998

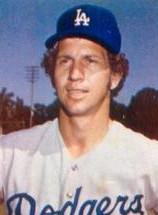
1998 BBWAA inductee Don Sutton

Elections to the Baseball Hall of Fame for 1998 followed the system in use since 1995. The Baseball Writers' Association of America (BBWAA) voted by mail to select from recent major league players and elected Don Sutton. The Veterans Committee met in closed sessions and selected four people from multiple classified ballots: George Davis, Larry Doby, Lee MacPhail, and Bullet Rogan. A formal induction ceremony was held in Cooperstown, New York, on July 26, 1998.

== BBWAA election ==
The BBWAA was authorized to elect players active in 1978 or later, but not after 1992; the ballot included candidates from the 1997 ballot who received at least 5% of the vote but were not elected, along with selected players, chosen by a screening committee, whose last appearance was in 1992. All 10-year members of the BBWAA were eligible to vote.

Voters were instructed to cast votes for up to 10 candidates; any candidate receiving votes on at least 75% of the ballots would be honored with induction to the Hall. The ballot consisted of 26 players; 473 ballots were cast, with 355 votes required for election. A total of 2,559 votes were cast, an average of 5.41 per ballot. Those candidates receiving less than 5% of the vote (24 votes) would not appear on future BBWAA ballots, and under then-current rules were also eliminated from future consideration by the Veterans Committee. A 2001 change in Hall policy restored the eligibility of players dropped from BBWAA balloting for Veterans Committee consideration.

Candidates who were eligible for the first time are indicated here with a dagger (†). The one candidate who received at least 75% of the vote and were elected is indicated in bold italics; candidates who have since been selected in subsequent elections are indicated in italics. The seven candidates who received less than 5% of the vote, thus becoming ineligible for future BBWAA consideration, are indicated with an asterisk (*).

Ron Santo was on the ballot for the 15th and final time.

Key to colors
Elected to the Hall. These individuals are also indicated in **bold italics**.
Players who were elected in future elections. These individuals are also indicated in plain italics.
Players not yet elected who returned on the 1999 ballot.
Eliminated from future BBWAA voting. Under rules of the time, players who received less than 5% of the vote were also eliminated from Veterans Committee consideration, but their eligibility for that process was restored in 2001.

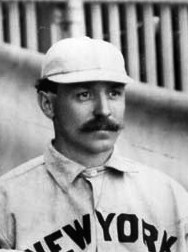
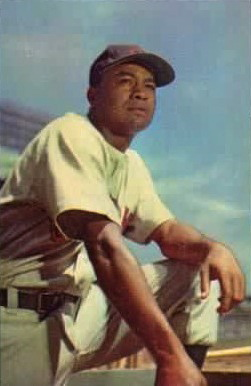
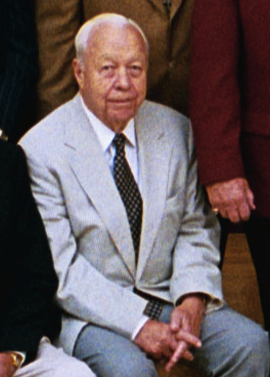
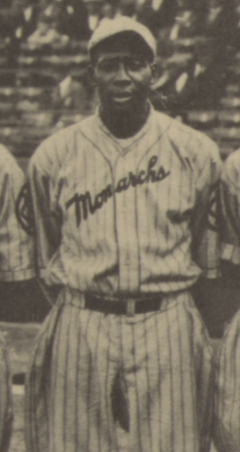
1998 Veterans Committee inductees (L-R): George Davis, Larry Doby, Lee MacPhail, and Bullet Rogan

Player	Votes	Percent	Change	Year
**Don Sutton**	**386**	**81.6**	▲8.4%	5th
Tony Pérez	321	67.9	▲1.9%	7th
Ron Santo	204	43.1	▲3.8%	15th
Jim Rice	203	42.9	▲5.3%	4th
Gary Carter†	200	42.3	-	1st
Steve Garvey	195	41.2	▲5.9%	6th
Bruce Sutter	147	31.1	▲3.6%	5th
Tommy John	129	27.3	▲6.8%	4th
Jim Kaat	129	27.3	▲4.7%	10th
Dave Parker	116	24.5	▲7.0%	2nd
Bert Blyleven†	83	17.5	-	1st
Dave Concepción	80	16.9	▲4.2%	5th
Minnie Miñoso	76	16.1	▼1.7%	14th
Luis Tiant	62	13.1	▲1.9%	11th
Keith Hernandez	51	10.8	▲1.3%	3rd
Dwight Evans	49	10.4	▲4.5%	2nd
Mickey Lolich	39	8.2	▲1.0%	14th
Ron Guidry	37	7.8	▲1.2%	5th
Bob Boone	26	5.5	▼0.4%	3rd
Jack Clark†*	7	1.5	-	1st
Pedro Guerrero†*	6	1.3	-	1st
Willie Randolph†*	5	1.1	-	1st
Carney Lansford†*	3	0.6	-	1st
Brian Downing†*	2	0.4	-	1st
Mike Flanagan†*	2	0.4	-	1st
Rick Dempsey†*	1	0.2	-	1st

The newly-eligible players included 17 All-Stars, nine of whom were not included on the ballot, representing a total of 44 All-Star selections. Among the new candidates were 11-time All-Star Gary Carter, 6-time All-Star Willie Randolph and 5-time All-Stars Pedro Guerrero. The field also included one Cy Young Award-winner, Mike Flanagan.

Players eligible for the first time who were not included on the ballot were: Jim Acker, Dave Anderson, Floyd Bannister, Jesse Barfield, Juan Berenguer, Dave Bergman, Don Carman, Rick Cerone, Mike Fitzgerald, Jim Gantner, Rich Gedman, Jerry Don Gleaton, Von Hayes, Brook Jacoby, Dennis Lamp, John Moses, Rance Mulliniks, Ken Oberkfell, Gary Pettis, Jamie Quirk, Rafael Ramirez, Don Robinson, Luis Salazar, Dave Schmidt, Mike Scioscia, Matt Sinatro, Dave Smith, Pat Tabler, Walt Terrell, and Denny Walling.

== Veterans Committee ==
The Veterans Committee met in closed sessions to elect as many as two executives, managers, umpires, and older major league players—the categories considered in all its meetings since 1953. By an arrangement since 1995 it separately considered candidates from the Negro leagues and from the 19th century with authority to select one from each of those two special ballots.

The committee elected four people, the maximum number permitted: center fielder Larry Doby from the 1950s, executive Lee MacPhail from the 1960s, pitcher Bullet Rogan from the Negro leagues, and shortstop George Davis from the 19th century.

== J. G. Taylor Spink Award ==
Sam Lacy received the J. G. Taylor Spink Award honoring a baseball writer. (The award was voted at the December 1997 meeting of the BBWAA, dated 1997, and included in the summer 1998 ceremonies.)

== Ford C. Frick Award ==
Jaime Jarrín received the Ford C. Frick Award honoring a baseball broadcaster.
