= Blue Springs State Park =

State park in Alabama, United States

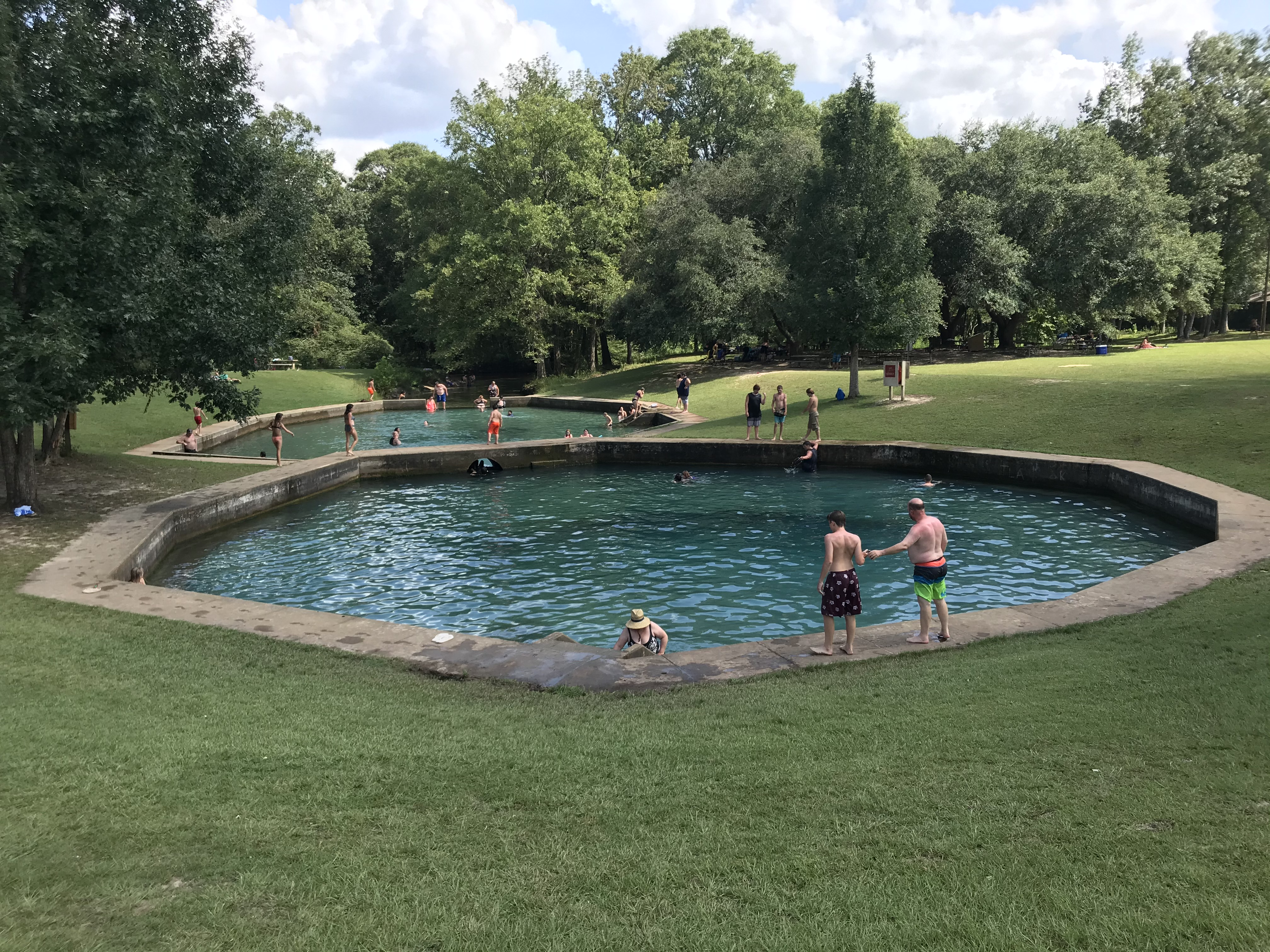

- Location within Alabama
- Interactive map of Blue Springs State Park
- Location: Blue Springs, Barbour County, Alabama, United States
- Nearest city: Clio, Alabama
- Coordinates: 31°39′49″N 85°30′23″W
- Area: 103 acres (42 ha)
- Elevation: 305 ft (93 m)
- Established: 1963
- Administrator: Alabama Department of Conservation and Natural Resources
- Designation: Alabama state park
- Website: Official website

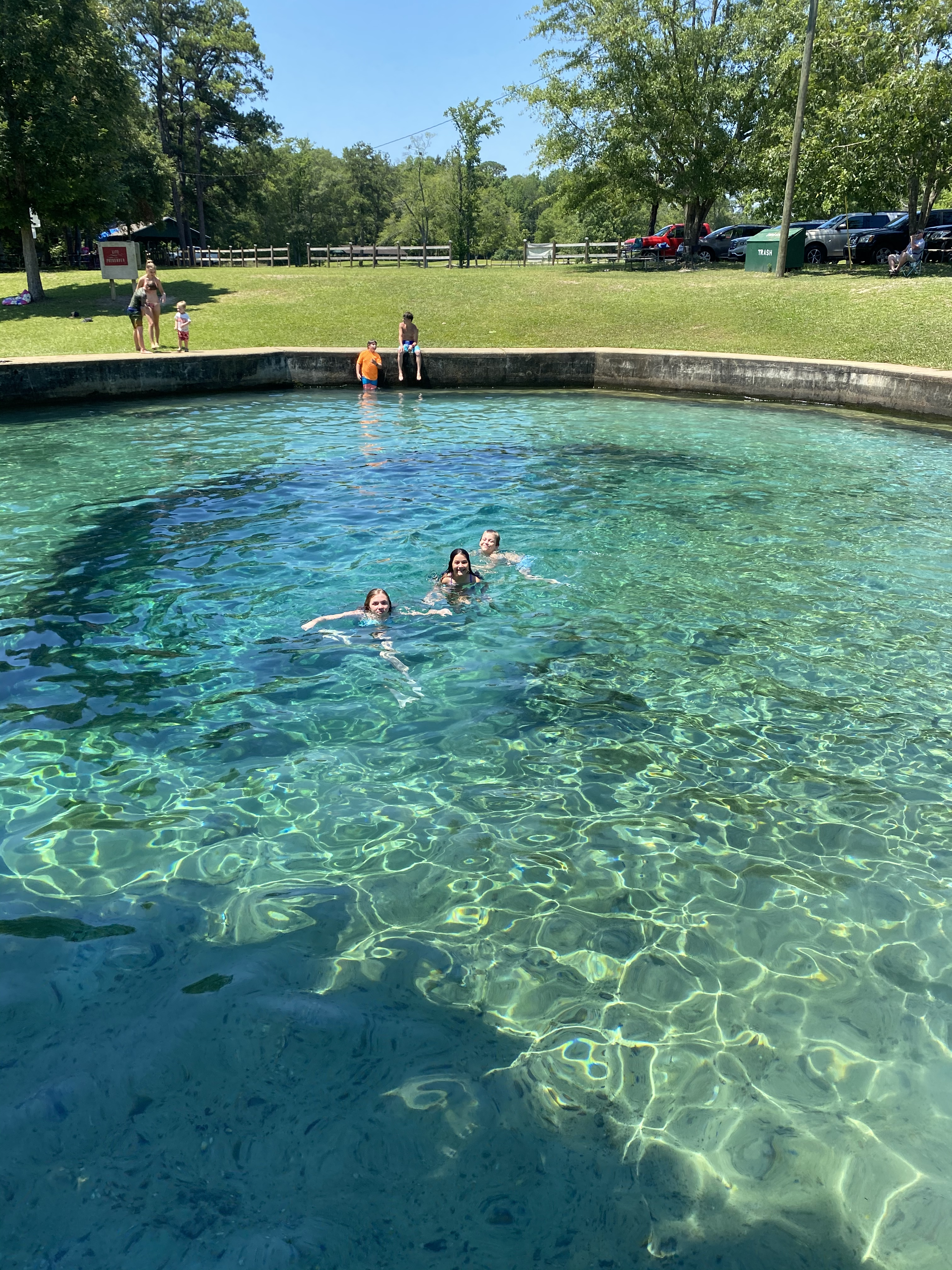
Swimmers at Blue Springs State Park, Alabama

Blue Springs State Park is a public recreation area located 7 mi (11 km) east of Clio in Blue Springs, Barbour County, Alabama. The 103-acre (42 ha) state park features a clear blue, natural underground spring that pumps 3,600 US gal (14,000 L) of water per minute into two concrete-ringed swimming pools. The park's recreational area was expanded in 2013 when the Forever Wild Land Trust purchased 100 acres (40 ha) adjoining acres for the purpose of providing hiking trails.

== History ==
Harrison's Hotel, built in 1890, was among the first efforts to turn the village of Blue Springs into a health spa. Ten years later, J.T.E. Whigham began work on the Blue Springs Hotel, which eventually featured 28 rooms and modern bathhouse. In 1913, the spring pool was lined with concrete and another smaller pool designed for use by children was added to the site. The area became a popular spot for political rallies, three-day horse-trading events, and annual reunions of Confederate soldiers. The large pool remained in operation until about 1938. J.D. McLaughlin sold the property to the state resulting in creation of the state park in 1963.

== Features ==
At the entrance to the park is a stone monument dedicated to Dr. James Daniel McLaughlin (1880-1953), a medical doctor who attended Atlanta College for Physicians and Surgeons and the medical extension program of the University of Alabama in Mobile.

== Activities and amenities ==
- Swimming: The natural spring for which the park is named has a sandy bottom, pumps 3,600 US gallons (14,000 L) of water per minute and stays at a constant temperature of 68 °F (20 °C). Swimming (without lifeguards) is permitted.
- Camping: The park has modern and primitive campsites, rental cabins, and rental campers.
- Fishing: A small pond is stocked with catfish, bass, and bream.
- Picnicking: The park's picnicking facilities include pavilions for rent.
- Playground: A playground made from 100% recycled material with two main structures suitable for children ages 2–5 and 5-12 and a large sandbox for younger children was added in 2014.
- Volleyball: The park's sand volleyball court offers tournaments in spring and summer.
- Hiking: The Magnolia Trail, along with two short connector trails, opened in 2018. The trail crosses 2 miles of southeast Alabama forest and provides views of the west fork of the Choctawhatchee River. The trailhead is located in the park with most of the trail traversing the adjacent Forever Wild Blue Springs State Park Addition.
