= Barbour County School District =

School district in Alabama, United States

Coordinates: 31.8792°N 85.4496°W

Address
- 168 Western Bypass Clayton, Alabama, 36016; United States

District information
- Type: Public
- Grades: PreK–12
- NCES District ID: 0100300

Students and staff
- Students: 687
- Teachers: 41.28
- Staff: 42.25
- Student–teacher ratio: 16.64

Other information
- Website: www.barbourcountyschools.org

Barbour County School District is a school district in Barbour County, Alabama.

Statewide testing ranks the schools in Alabama. Those in the bottom six percent are listed as "failing." As of early 2018, Barbour County High School was included in this category.
