= Harold Pierce =

American entrepreneur (1917–1988)

- Born: August 11, 1917; Midway, Alabama, United States
- Died: March 8, 1988 (aged 70); Kankakee, Illinois, United States
- Title: Founder of Harold's Chicken Shack

Harold P. Pierce (August 11, 1917 – March 8, 1988) was an African-American entrepreneur who founded the successful Harold's Chicken Shack restaurant chain in Chicago, Illinois.

Pierce was born in Midway, Alabama, and moved to Chicago in 1943 from Freemanville, Alabama, to work as a chauffeur for Jack Stern, a furniture store owner. By 1950, he was running a small restaurant with his wife, Hilda, on 39th Street. The H & H specialized in chicken feet and dumplings. Pierce thought that he could adapt his recipe for fried chicken, and a friend, Gene Rosen, who ran a poultry shop nearby, offered him some chickens to experiment with. The resultant recipe caused Pierce to open Harold's Chicken Shack at 47th and Greenwood in 1950.

He franchised the idea out to friends and family who opened additional Harold Chicken Shacks throughout Chicago. One of Pierce's stipulations was that they purchase their chickens from Rosen. Otherwise, Pierce did not interfere with the management of the stores, which led to deviations in the techniques, flavors, and qualities of the product as well as variations in the menu from one restaurant to another. After retiring in the early 1980s, he moved to Beaverville, Illinois, where he indulged in a passion for raising hunting dogs. Pierce died in Kankakee, Illinois, of prostate cancer in 1988. His second wife, Willa, took over running the business and began expanding it outside of Chicago. Willa died on January 21, 2003, in Beaverville.
