= Clio, Alabama =

City in Alabama, United States

- City
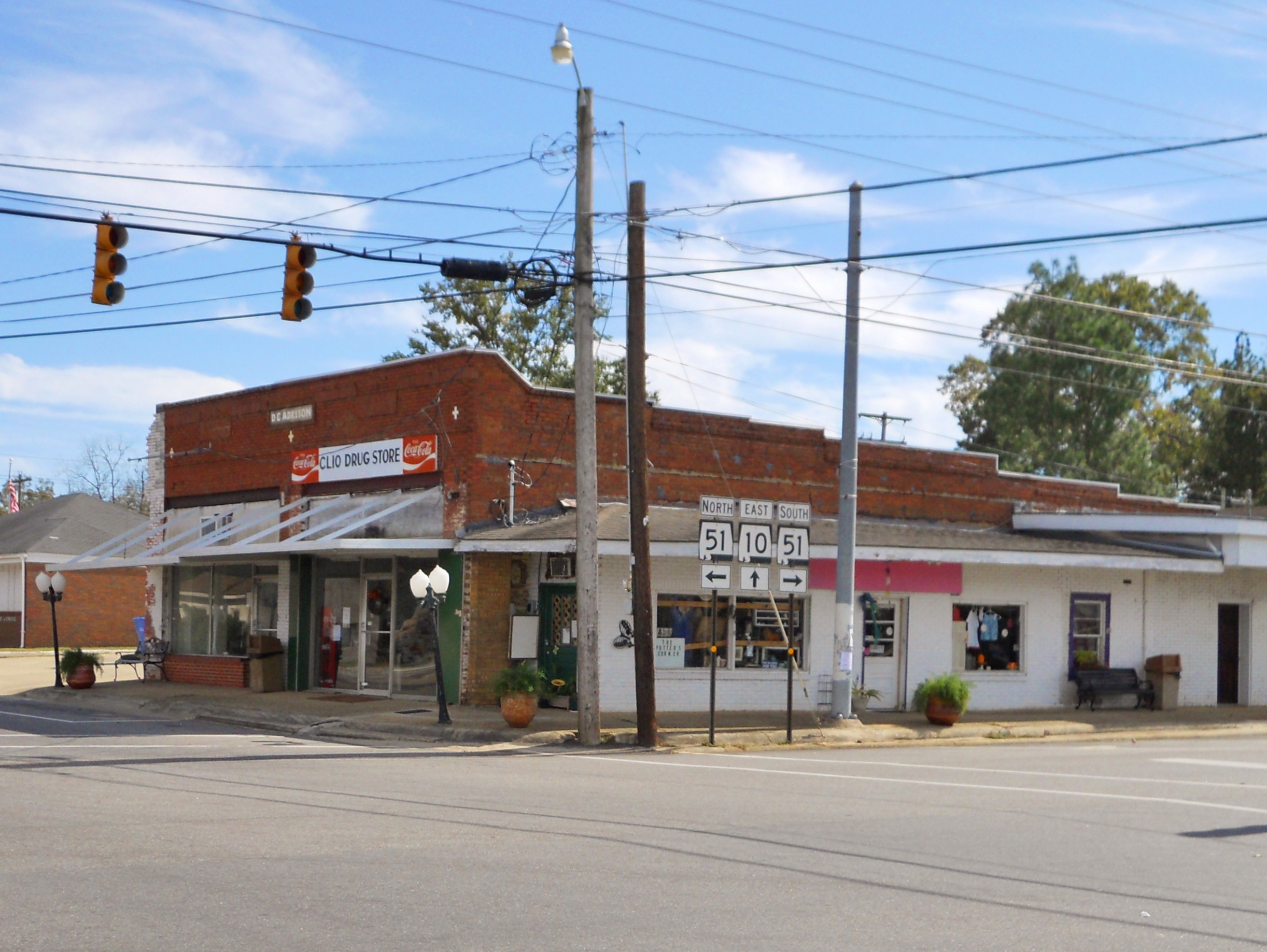
- Downtown Clio

- Flag Seal

- Location of Clio in Barbour County, Alabama.
- Coordinates: 31°42′34″N 85°37′24″W
- Country: United States
- State: Alabama
- County: Barbour

Area
  - Total: 10.07 sq mi (26.09 km^{2})
  - Land: 10.07 sq mi (26.07 km^{2})
  - Water: 0.0077 sq mi (0.02 km^{2})
- Elevation: 528 ft (161 m)

Population (2020)
  - Total: 1,220
  - Density: 121/sq mi (46.8/km^{2})
- Time zone: UTC-6 (Central (CST))
  - Summer (DST): UTC-5 (CDT)
- ZIP code: 36017
- Area code: 334
- FIPS code: 01-15640
- GNIS feature ID: 2404082
- Website: clioal.com

Clio is a city in Barbour County, Alabama, United States. As of the 2020 census, Clio had a population of 1,220. It is the birthplace of former Alabama governor George Wallace, as well as Baseball Hall of Famer and former Atlanta Braves broadcaster Don Sutton.

== Geography ==
According to the U.S. Census Bureau, the city has a total area of 10.1 square miles (26.1 km^{2}), of which 0.008 square miles (0.02 km^{2}), or 0.09%, is water.

The center of Clio lies at the intersection of Alabama State Routes 10 and 51. Highway 10 leads west 13 miles to Brundidge and east 7 miles to Blue Springs. Highway 51 leads 11 miles south to Ariton and north 7 miles to Louisville and 16 miles to the county seat of Clayton.

== Demographics ==
Historical population
Census	Pop.	Note	%±
1900	326		—
1910	580		77.9%
1920	838		44.5%
1930	867		3.5%
1940	841		−3.0%
1950	840		−0.1%
1960	929		10.6%
1970	1,065		14.6%
1980	1,224		14.9%
1990	1,365		11.5%
2000	2,206		61.6%
2010	1,399		−36.6%
2020	1,220		−12.8%
U.S. Decennial Census; 2013 Estimate

=== Racial and ethnic composition ===
Clio city, Alabama – Racial and ethnic composition Note: the US Census treats Hispanic/Latino as an ethnic category. This table excludes Latinos from the racial categories and assigns them to a separate category. Hispanics/Latinos may be of any race. Race and ethnicity was not surveyed for populations under 2,500 in the 1980 census and under 1,000 in 1990 census.
Race / Ethnicity (NH = Non-Hispanic)	Pop 1990	Pop 2000	Pop 2010	Pop 2020	% 1990	% 2000	% 2010	% 2020
White alone (NH)	567	812	370	246	41.54%	36.81%	26.45%	20.16%
Black or African American alone (NH)	781	1,252	508	466	57.22%	56.75%	36.31%	38.20%
Native American or Alaska Native alone (NH)	7	26	5	0	0.51%	1.18%	0.36%	0.00%
Asian alone (NH)	2	6	7	8	0.15%	0.27%	0.50%	0.66%
Native Hawaiian or Pacific Islander alone (NH)	x	1	2	0	x	0.05%	0.14%	0.00%
Other race alone (NH)	0	0	3	3	0.00%	0.00%	0.21%	0.25%
Mixed race or Multiracial (NH)	x	36	1	26	x	1.63%	0.07%	2.13%
Hispanic or Latino (any race)	8	73	503	471	0.59%	3.31%	35.95%	38.61%
Total	1,365	2,206	1,399	1,220	100.00%	100.00%	100.00%	100.00%

=== 2020 census ===
As of the 2020 census, Clio had a population of 1,220 and 482 households, including 238 families. The median age was 37.6 years; 23.6% of residents were under the age of 18 and 16.6% of residents were 65 years of age or older. For every 100 females there were 91.8 males, and for every 100 females age 18 and over there were 92.6 males age 18 and over.

There were 482 households, 34.6% of which had children under the age of 18 living in them. Of all households, 39.2% were married-couple households, 18.7% were households with a male householder and no spouse or partner present, and 36.5% were households with a female householder and no spouse or partner present. About 30.1% of all households were made up of individuals and 14.1% had someone living alone who was 65 years of age or older.

There were 578 housing units, of which 16.6% were vacant. The homeowner vacancy rate was 0.0% and the rental vacancy rate was 6.5%.

0.0% of residents lived in urban areas, while 100.0% lived in rural areas.

=== 2010 census ===
As of the census of 2010, there were 1,399 people, 514 households, and 321 families residing in the town. The population density was 139 inhabitants per square mile (54/km^{2}). There were 634 housing units at an average density of 62.7 per square mile (24.2/km^{2}). The racial makeup of the town was 36.5% Black or African American, 32.0% White, 0.4% Native American, 0.5% Asian, 0.1% Pacific Islander, 30.2% from other races, and .4% from two or more races. 36.0% of the population were Hispanic or Latino of any race.

There were 514 households, out of which 28.8% had children under the age of 18 living with them, 35.4% were married couples living together, 19.8% had a female householder with no husband present, and 37.5% were non-families. 30.9% of all households were made up of individuals, and 12.7% had someone living alone who was 65 years of age or older. The average household size was 2.72 and the average family size was 3.37.

In the town the population was spread out, with 26.2% under the age of 18, 12.9% from 18 to 24, 26.6% from 25 to 44, 22.4% from 45 to 64, and 11.8% who were 65 years of age or older. The median age was 31.8 years. For every 100 females, there were 95.7 males. For every 100 females age 18 and over, there were 85.4 males.

The median income for a household in the town was $21,806, and the median income for a family was $33,438. Males had a median income of $32,908 versus $25,625 for females. The per capita income for the town was $8,722. About 28.3% of families and 28.0% of the population were below the poverty line, including 33.1% of those under age 18 and 19.1% of those age 65 or over.

== Notable people ==
- McDowell Lee, member of the Alabama House of Representatives and Mayor of Clio.
- Elton Bryson Stephens, Sr., founder of EBSCO Industries.
- Don Sutton, Major League Baseball Hall of Famer.
- George Corley Wallace, four-term Governor of Alabama and candidate for U.S. president.

== Points of interest ==
- Blue Springs State Park
- Easterling Correctional Facility

== Gallery ==
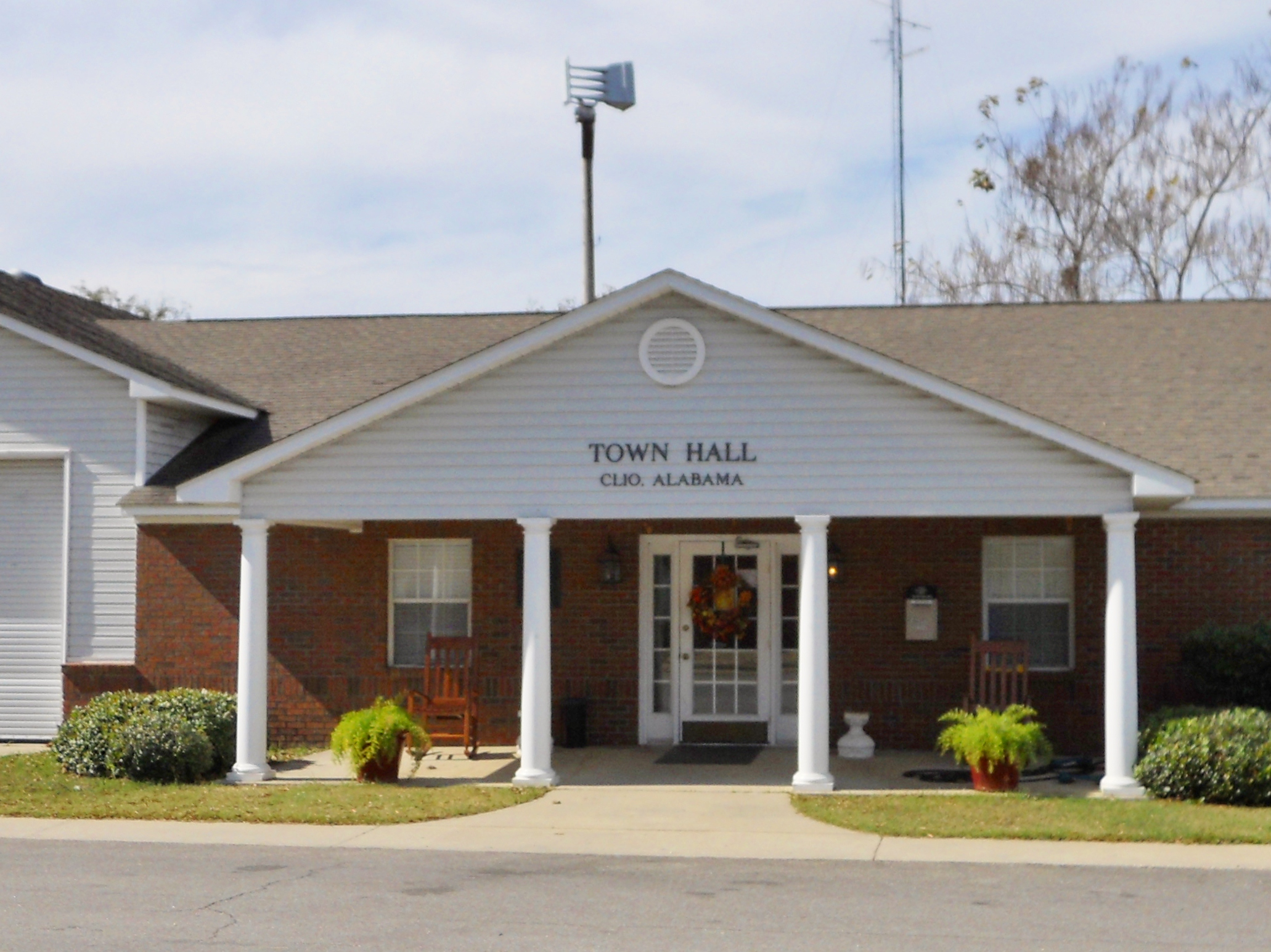
Clio Town Hall

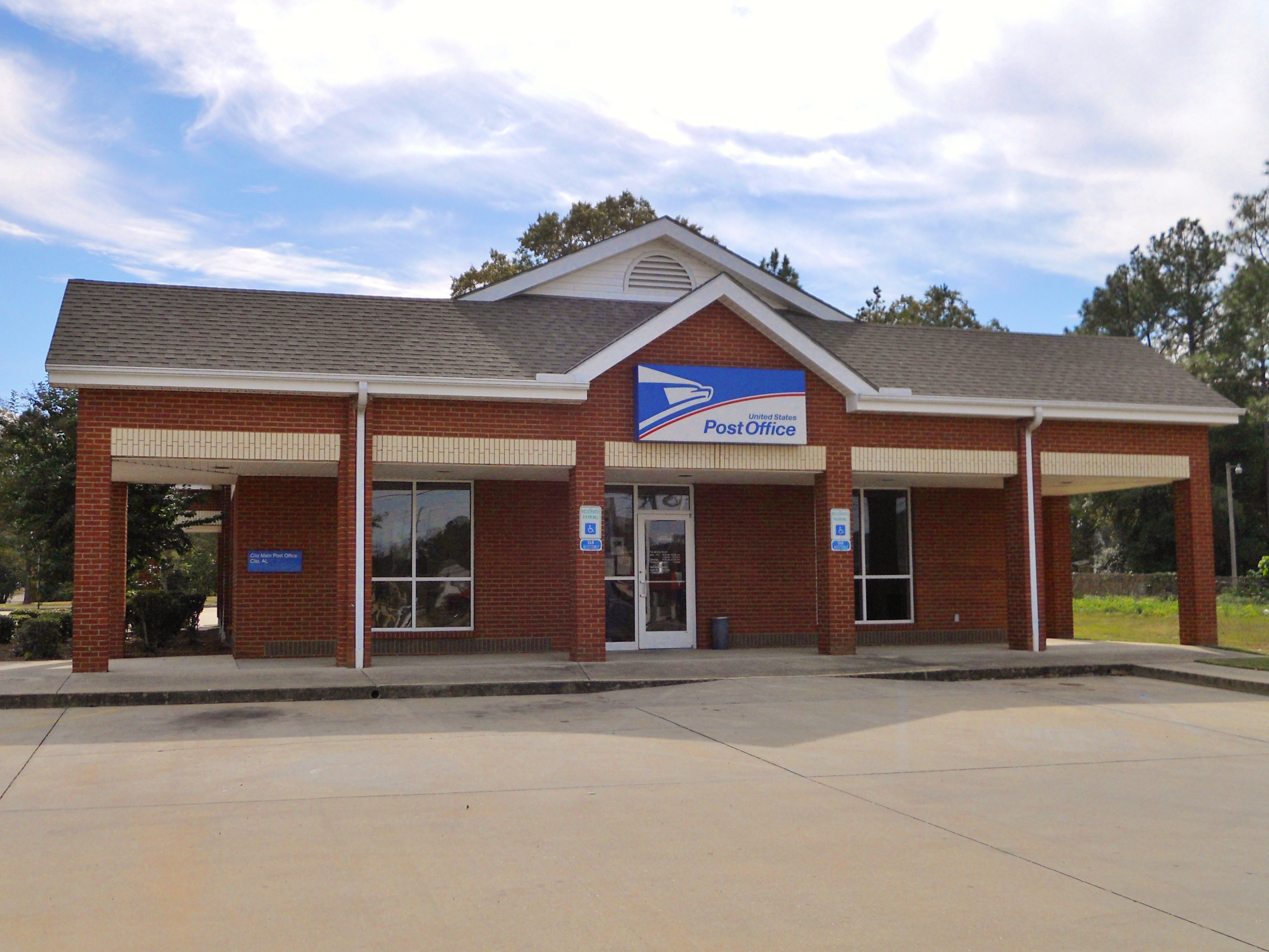
Clio Post Office (ZIP Code: 36017)
