= Aberfoil, Alabama =

Unincorporated community in Alabama, United States

- Unincorporated community
- Location within Alabama Location within the United States
- Coordinates: 32°04′15″N 85°41′16″W
- Country: United States
- State: Alabama
- County: Bullock
- Elevation: 564 ft (172 m)
- Time zone: UTC-6 (Central (CST))
  - Summer (DST): UTC-5 (CDT)
- Area code: 334
- GNIS feature ID: 112891

Aberfoil is an unincorporated community in Bullock County, in the U.S. state of Alabama. The main roads through the community are U.S. Route 29 and Alabama State Route 239.

== History ==
A post office was established at Aberfoil in 1837, and remained in operation until it was discontinued in 1905. A scene of the novel Rob Roy set in Aberfoyle, Scotland, likely inspired the naming.

== Demographics ==
According to the census returns from 1850-2010 for Alabama, it has never reported a population figure separately on the U.S. Census.
