= George Davis (baseball) =

American baseball player and manager (1870–1940)

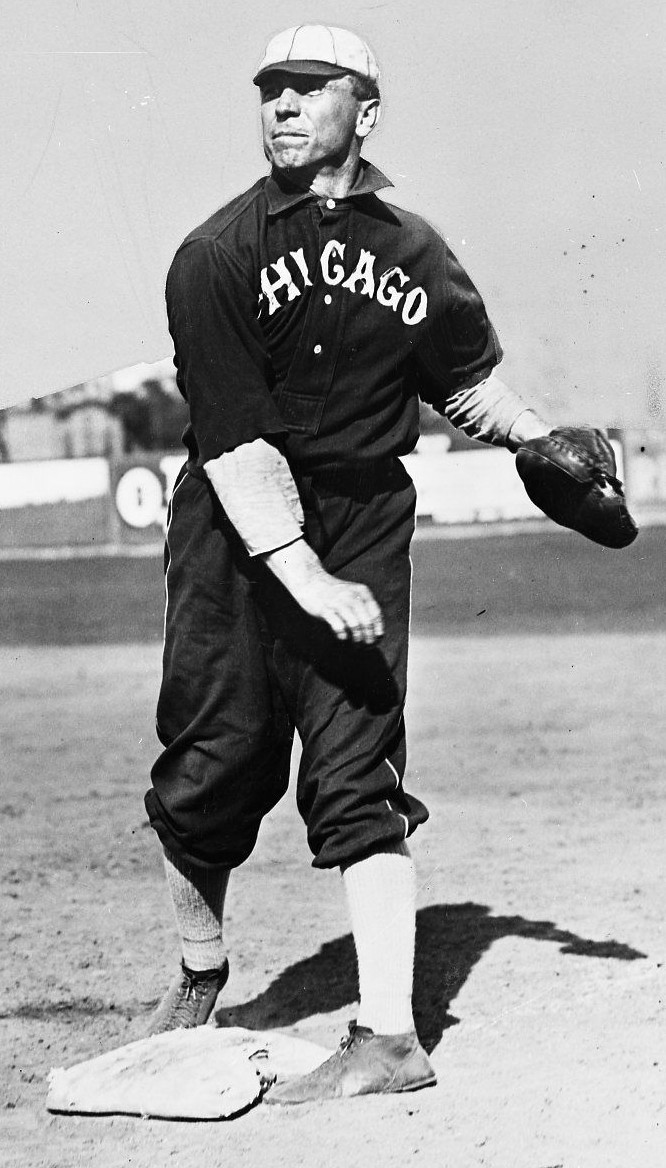
- Shortstop / Manager
- Born: August 23, 1870; Cohoes, New York, U.S.
- Died: October 17, 1940 (aged 70); Philadelphia, Pennsylvania, U.S.
- Batted: Switch Threw: Right

MLB debut
- April 19, 1890, for the Cleveland Spiders

Last MLB appearance
- August 15, 1909, for the Chicago White Sox

MLB statistics
- Batting average: .295
- Hits: 2,665
- Home runs: 73
- Runs batted in: 1,440
- Stolen bases: 619
- Stats at Baseball Reference
- Managerial record at Baseball Reference

Teams
- As player: Cleveland Spiders (1890–1892); New York Giants (1893–1901); Chicago White Sox (1902); New York Giants (1903); Chicago White Sox (1904–1909); As manager: New York Giants (1895, 1900–1901)

Career highlights and awards
- World Series champion (1906); NL RBI leader (1897)

Member of the National

Baseball Hall of Fame
- Induction: 1998
- Election method: Veterans Committee

George Stacey Davis (August 23, 1870 – October 17, 1940) was an American professional baseball shortstop and manager in Major League Baseball at the turn of the 20th century. Davis also spent multiple seasons as a third baseman and center fielder, and lesser amounts of time at other positions. He broke into the major leagues in 1890 and played through 1909. He is ranked among the top 100 players of all time in several statistical categories. Davis was the first switch hitter to reach 2,000 hits.

After his playing career, Davis managed the Amherst College baseball team for several years. He died in a mental institution, suffering the effects of syphilis. Not much was known about Davis's life or career until the 1990s, when he gained some recognition from the city historian of his hometown of Cohoes, New York. He was elected to the Hall of Fame by the Veterans Committee in 1998.

== Early life ==
Born on August 23, 1870, in Cohoes, New York, Davis was one of seven children born to Abram and Sarah Davis. His father had immigrated from Wales and his mother came from England. Davis was playing amateur baseball in Albany when he was 16 years old and he could bat from both sides of the plate.

By 1889, Davis was on a team of semiprofessional and amateur players near the Hudson River in Albany. The squad was managed by Tom York, a former major league player. York recommended Davis for major league service with the Cleveland Spiders. The team signed Davis for the 1890 season.

== Early playing career ==
Davis patrolled center field for the first two seasons of his career, leading the National League (NL) in outfield assists with 35 in 1890. He made three brief appearances as a pitcher in 1891, giving up seven earned runs in four innings and recording one save. That year he was among the league's top ten players in hits, doubles, triples, total bases, runs batted in (RBI), plate appearances and assists as an outfielder.

Davis never appeared as a pitcher again, but his strong arm did lead the team to move him to third base in 1892, a position he played for the next five seasons. His batting average dropped almost 50 points to .241 in 1892, but he recorded 82 RBI and 36 stolen bases.

== New York Giants ==
The Spiders traded Davis to the New York Giants for aging star Buck Ewing shortly before the 1893 season, and Davis blossomed in New York City. With league rules moving the pitcher's mound back to 60 feet, 6 inches that season, offensive totals jumped across the league, and Davis was at the forefront of the surge. He compiled a .355 batting average and set career highs with 27 triples and 11 home runs. He also collected 22 doubles and 37 stolen bases, while scoring 112 runs and driving in 119. He became the first player to hit a triple and a home run in the same inning.

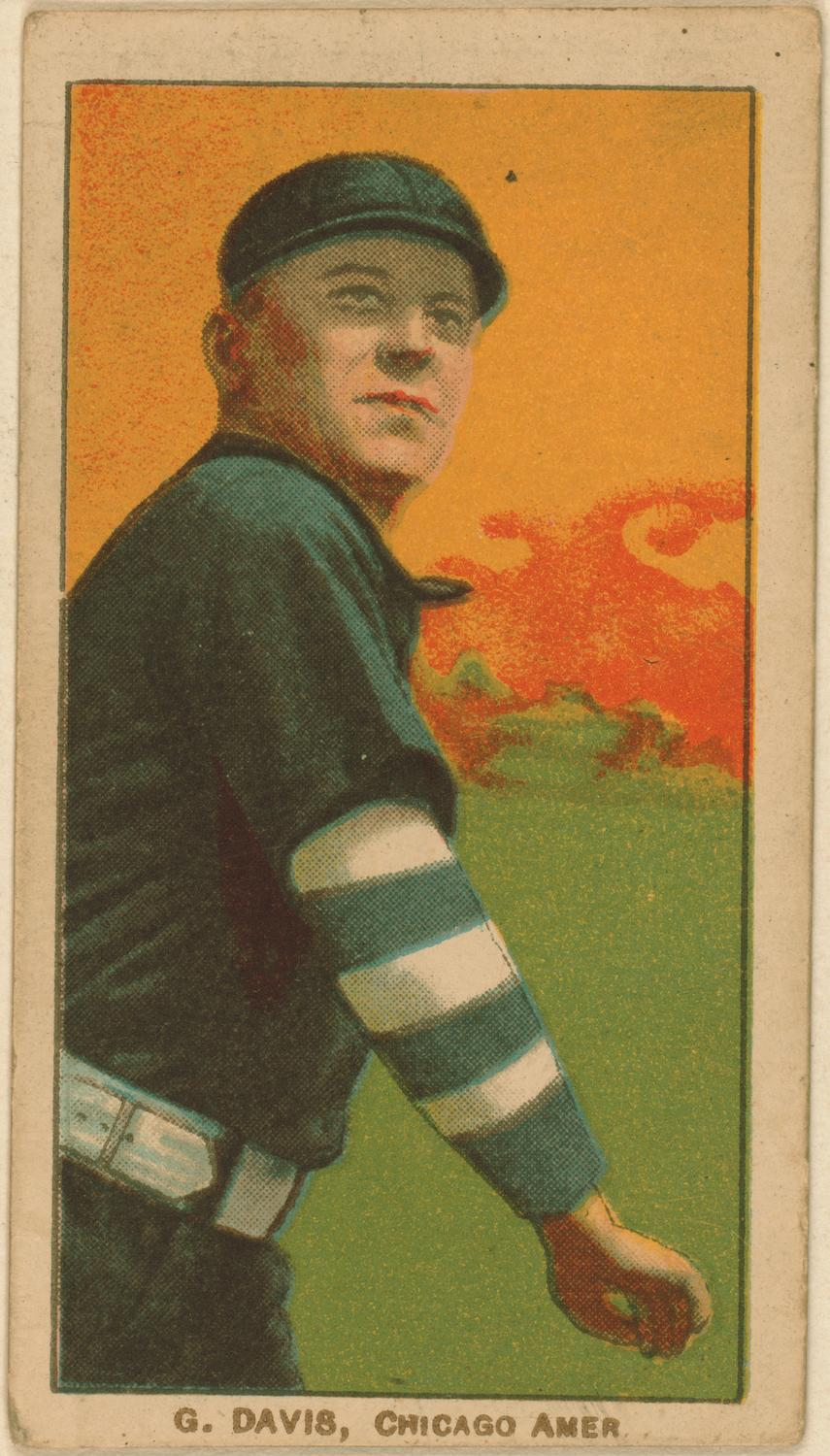
George Davis baseball card (1909–1911)

Davis continued to perform at an elite level throughout the 1890s, regularly ranking among the league leaders in doubles, triples, RBI, and stolen bases. He had a batting average of more than .300 for nine consecutive seasons beginning in 1893. He began playing more shortstop in 1896 and moved to the position full-time the next season. In 1897, Davis hit .353 and registered a league-best 135 RBI. He led the league in double plays and fielding percentage four times each.

During his playing career, Davis enjoyed a reputation as an intelligent and hard-working player who did not participate in dirty play. On their way to practice at the Polo Grounds on April 26, 1900, Davis and teammates Kid Gleason and Mike Grady stumbled upon a raging tenement fire. The players rushed into the building and rescued two women and a three-year-old child. The fire left 45 families homeless. Davis said, "I didn't do much. I just went up the ladder the same as the rest of the boys and helped to carry down women and children... I didn't do half as much as Grady and Gleason." His face blistered from the heat, Davis helped his team earn a 10–10 tie with the Boston Beaneaters that evening.

== Later career ==
The formation of the American League provided new financial opportunities to ballplayers, and induced by a $4,000 salary, Davis jumped to the Chicago White Sox in 1902. He became the first switch hitter to achieve 2,000 hits during the season. He attempted a return to the Giants the following season for a further raise to $6,700 (the second-highest figure in the league, after that of Nap Lajoie), but was prevented by the implementation of a peace agreement between the warring leagues.

Davis sat out the bulk of the 1903 season before returning to the White Sox, with whom he spent the remainder of his career. His raw offensive statistics from this time pale before those of his earlier career, but when properly compared to a drastic league-wide decline in offense, they remain impressive. Davis stole home in Game 5 of the 1906 World Series for the champion White Sox. He also had three runs batted in for the Sox in the title-clinching Game 6 against the crosstown Chicago Cubs. His productivity declined in 1907, as he batted .238, his lowest batting average since 1892. He batted worse the following year, batting .217 in 128 games played. In 1909, he played just 28 games while batting .132 before he played his final game on August 15.

His career totals in several statistical categories rank in the top 100 players all-time, including games played, at bats, hits, runs, doubles, triples, RBI and stolen bases.

== Later life ==
Davis returned to the minor leagues for one season as player-manager of the 1910 Des Moines Boosters. He managed a bowling alley in the early 1910s. He was the Amherst College baseball coach from 1913 to 1918, then he became a car salesman.

The circumstances of his death remained a mystery until baseball historian Lee Allen discovered its details through a campaign to track down historical baseball players, run in part in The Sporting News. Davis was admitted to a Philadelphia mental institution in 1934 suffering from paresis due to tertiary syphilis. He died in the institution in 1940. Davis was survived by his wife Jane, who was said to have been angry at him when he died. His wife spent $41 to have his body buried within a day at nearby Fernwood Cemetery.

== Legacy ==
In a 1995 book, baseball author Bill James referred to Davis as baseball's best player who had not been inducted into the Baseball Hall of Fame. Also in 1995, Davis was featured in David Pietrusza's television film Local Heroes in the segment "Knocking on Cooperstown's Door."

In 1997, baseball researcher Frederick Ivor-Campbell said that Davis was "the most neglected player of the 19th century. He's definitely the best eligible player not in the Hall, and he's a lot better than a lot of guys already in." Around the same time, Davis was rated the 21st best baseball player of all time in the official baseball encyclopedia, Total Baseball.

Davis was up for a vote before the Hall of Fame's Veterans Committee in 1998. Before the committee voted, sportswriter Dave Anderson wrote an article in The New York Times on Davis's Hall of Fame candidacy. He pointed out the work of Cohoes city historian Walt Lipka, which favorably compared Davis to almost all of the shortstops in the Hall of Fame. Anderson supported Davis's election, saying, "It's as if he were discarded nearly a century ago into a time capsule that was forgotten until now... For too long, George Stacey Davis has been his era's most forgotten best player." He was selected for induction that year.

Prior to his Hall of Fame induction, a Society for American Baseball Research (SABR) chapter in New York put out a call to locate a descendant of Davis to be present at the induction ceremony and announced plans for a historical marker in Cohoes. As a great deal of time had passed since his death, no relatives could be located, but a group of about 50 people from Cohoes traveled to the ceremony in support of Davis.

== See also ==
- List of Major League Baseball career stolen bases leaders
- List of Major League Baseball career triples leaders
- List of Major League Baseball career runs batted in leaders
- List of Major League Baseball career runs scored leaders
- List of Major League Baseball career doubles leaders
- List of Major League Baseball annual runs batted in leaders
- List of Major League Baseball career hits leaders
- List of Major League Baseball player-managers
- List of Major League Baseball single-game hits leaders
