= Alabama State Route 198 =

State highway in Alabama, United States

State Route 198
- Eufaula Avenue

Route information
- Maintained by ALDOT
- Length: 1.686 mi (2.713 km)

Major junctions
- West end: SR 239 in Clayton
- East end: SR 30 in Clayton

Location
- Country: United States
- State: Alabama
- Counties: Barbour

Highway system
- Alabama State Highway System; Interstate; US; State
← SR 197	→ SR 199

State Route 198 (SR 198) is a 1.686-mile-long (2.713 km) route that serves as a connection between SR 30 and SR 239 in Clayton.

== Route description ==
The western terminus of SR 198 is located at its intersection with SR 239 (S/N Midway Street) in downtown Clayton. From this point, the route travels in an easterly direction before turning to the south en route to its eastern terminus at SR 30 (Southern Bypass). It is known as Eufaula Avenue for its entire length.

== Major intersections ==
The entire route is in Barbour County.

Location	mi	km	Destinations	Notes
Clayton	0.0	0.0	SR 239 (N/S Midway Street)	Western terminus
Clayton	1.686	2.713	SR 30 (Southern Bypass) to SR 51 – Eufaula	Eastern terminus
1.000 mi = 1.609 km; 1.000 km = 0.621 mi
