= Harold's Chicken Shack =

American fast food chain

Harold's Chicken
- Type: Private
- Industry: Restaurants
- Genre: Casual dining Take out
- Founded: 1950; 76 years ago
- Headquarters: Chicago, Illinois, United States
- Key people: Harold Pierce (founder)
- Products: Fried chicken Seafood
- Number of employees: over 3,000
- Website: www.haroldschickenscorp.com

Harold's Chicken Shack (also referred to as The Fried Chicken King, Harold's Chicken, or simply Harold's) is a popular fried chicken restaurant based in Chicago, Illinois. The chain operates primarily in Chicago's predominantly black communities but has additional locations in Carbondale, Illinois; Springfield, Illinois; Northwest Indiana; Elkhart, Indiana; Indianapolis, Indiana; Phoenix, Arizona; Atlanta, Georgia; Las Vegas, Nevada; St. Louis, Missouri; Houston, Texas; Brooklyn Center, Minnesota; and Los Angeles, California.

== History ==
Harold Pierce, an African-American entrepreneur who moved to Chicago in 1943, founded the restaurant on June 22, 1950, at the corner of 47th Street and Kenwood, near the estate where he worked as a chauffeur. Harold and his wife also operated a soul food restaurant on 39th street called the H&H (Harold&Hilda); their specialties were dumplings and chicken feet. Pierce differed from other fast-food innovators in his development of Harold's brand. He wanted each franchisor to develop its personality rather than forcing each to fit the same mold. Some Harold's restaurants are very informal, with takeaway chicken served by employees standing behind a window of bulletproof glass (originally introduced as a necessity rather than an aesthetic concern). Others offer the option to dine in. Harold's Chicken Shacks may or may not offer fountain drinks, additional menu items, catering services, or delivery. The only constants are the basic chicken dinners and the emblem of a cook chasing a chicken with a cleaver. Even this varies greatly, sometimes rendered in lights and sometimes hand-painted. Often, the cook is dressed like a king. Harold's restaurants are also referred to as "Harold's: The Fried Chicken King", which can be seen on many older South Side signs.

Harold's Chicken Shack is located primarily in Chicago, Illinois, with 40 locations across the city, particularly on its South Side, concentration in which is due in part to redlining, which limited Pierce's expansion opportunities to black neighborhoods. There are dozens of "shacks" on Chicago's South Side and the neighboring southern suburbs, several on the West Side, multiple west suburban locations (e.g., in Oak Park and Aurora) and a few on the city's North Side. In 2012, a location opened in Atlanta which featured a bar, called Harold's Chicken and Ice Bar. As of 2025, over 100 locations exist across the country, including three in Atlanta and one in Charlotte, which features a bar and hookah.

The daughter of founder Harold Pierce and CEO Kristen Pierce died January 2026.

== Connection to culture ==
Harold's Chicken Shack is part of Chicago's South Side culture. The restaurant is often referenced by Chicago's hip-hop community, including Kanye West, Common, Rhymefest, Juice, G Herbo, Chance the Rapper, Freddie Gibbs, Lupe Fiasco and Dreezy. Rapper Wale stated in the song That Way, that Harold's Chicken was overrated. Top Dawg Entertainment rapper Kendrick Lamar mentioned Harold's Chicken in Fredo Santana's song, "Jealous", in which Lamar is featured, where he claimed that he flew a private jet there directly from Rome due to his enthusiasm for the chicken, metonymously Chicago.

Harold's has been shown in a scene on the television show South Side, as well as part of the music videos for BJ The Chicago Kid's "It's True" and Freddie Gibbs' "Harold's". Harold's is also shown next to the bar visited early in the movie Weird Science.

== See also ==
- Chicago-style barbecue
- List of fast-food chicken restaurants
