= Blue Springs, Alabama =

- Town
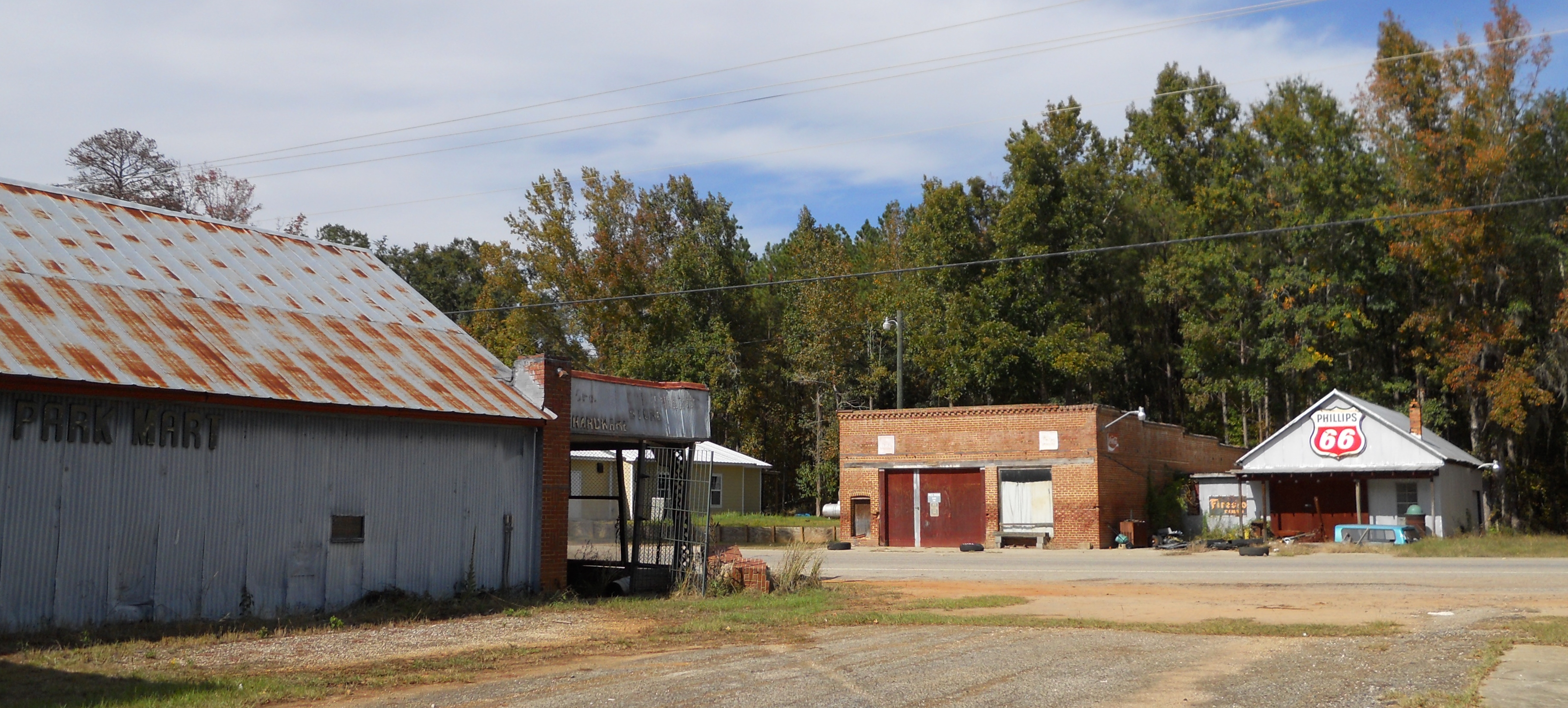
- Downtown Blue Springs

- Location of Blue Springs in Barbour County, Alabama.
- Coordinates: 31°39′49″N 85°29′52″W
- Country: United States
- State: Alabama
- County: Barbour

Area
  - Total: 2.90 sq mi (7.50 km^{2})
  - Land: 2.90 sq mi (7.50 km^{2})
  - Water: 0 sq mi (0.00 km^{2})
- Elevation: 292 ft (89 m)

Population (2020)
  - Total: 84
  - Density: 29/sq mi (11.2/km^{2})
- Time zone: UTC-6 (Central (CST))
  - Summer (DST): UTC-5 (CDT)
- ZIP code: 36017
- Area code: 334
- FIPS code: 01-07672
- GNIS feature ID: 2405286

Blue Springs is a town in southern Barbour County, Alabama, United States. At the 2020 census, the population was 84. The town is the home of Blue Springs State Park.

== Geography ==
According to the U.S. Census Bureau, the town has a total area of 2.9 square miles (7.5 km^{2}), all land.

== Demographics ==
Historical population
Census	Pop.	Note	%±
1910	117		—
1920	162		38.5%
1930	164		1.2%
1940	167		1.8%
1950	111		−33.5%
1960	94		−15.3%
1970	137		45.7%
1980	112		−18.2%
1990	108		−3.6%
2000	121		12.0%
2010	96		−20.7%
2020	84		−12.5%
U.S. Decennial Census

As of the census of 2000, there were 121 people, 49 households, and 36 families residing in the town. The population density was 41.8 inhabitants per square mile (16.1/km^{2}). There were 54 housing units at an average density of 18.7 per square mile (7.2/km^{2}). The racial makeup of the town was 99.17% White and 0.83% Black or African American.

There were 49 households, out of which 28.6% had children under the age of 18 living with them, 67.3% were married couples living together, 6.1% had a female householder with no husband present, and 24.5% were non-families. 20.4% of all households were made up of individuals, and 10.2% had someone living alone who was 65 years of age or older. The average household size was 2.47 and the average family size was 2.84.

In the town, the population was spread out, with 22.3% under the age of 18, 7.4% from 18 to 24, 28.1% from 25 to 44, 31.4% from 45 to 64, and 10.7% who were 65 years of age or older. The median age was 39 years. For every 100 females, there were 95.2 males. For every 100 females age 18 and over, there were 95.8 males.

The median income for a household in the town was $38,000, and the median income for a family was $38,250. Males had a median income of $27,000 versus $21,500 for females. The per capita income for the town was $17,224. There were 6.5% of families and 4.3% of the population living below the poverty line, including no under eighteens and 33.3% of those over 64.

== Points of interest ==
- Blue Springs State Park is a 103-acre (42 ha) property along the West Fork Choctawhatchee River near the center of town. It features a spring pool, campground and picnicking.
- Blue Reindeer Creek is a designated site of historical interest.
