= Midway, Alabama =

- Town
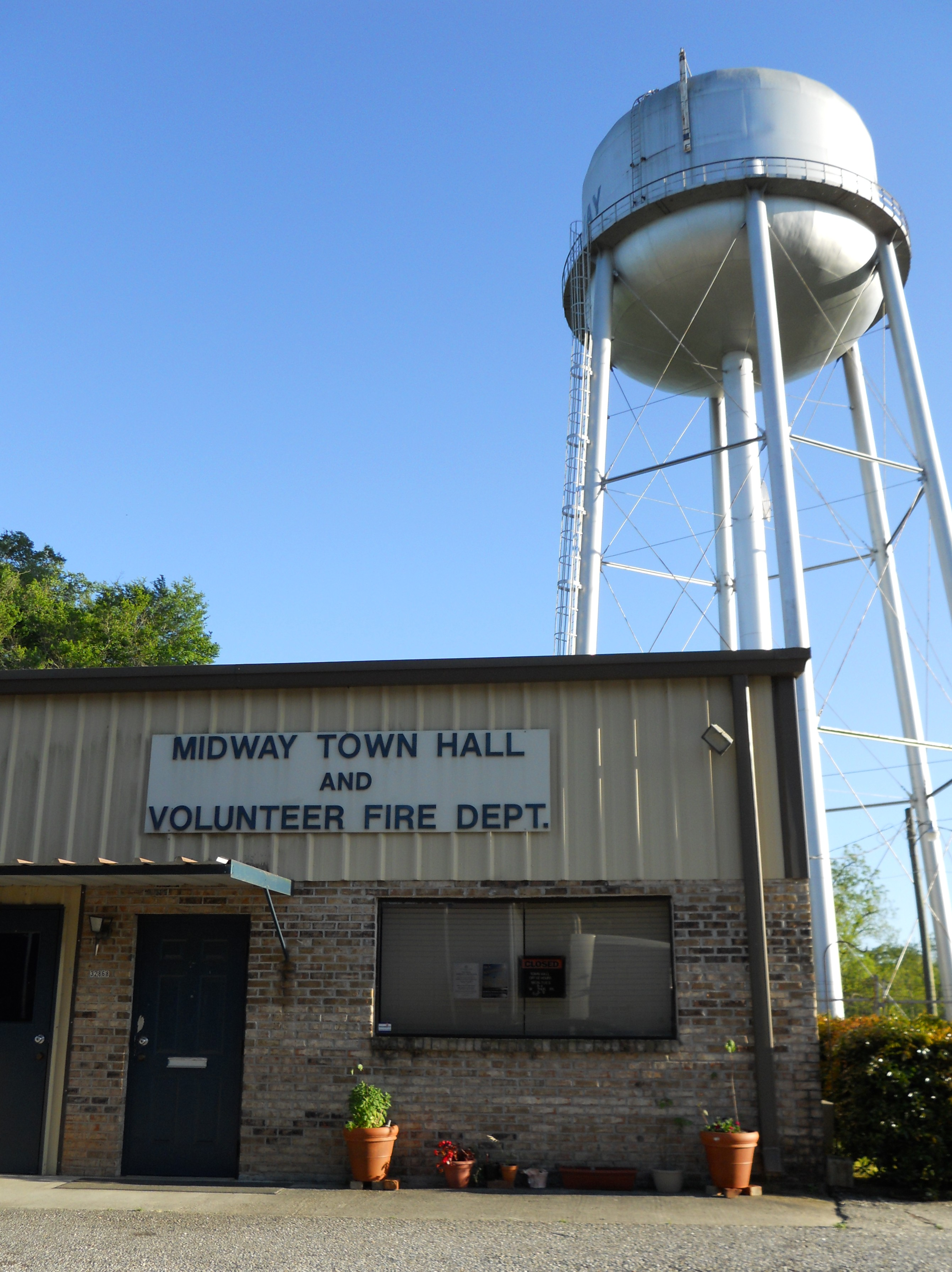
- Midway Town Hall and Volunteer Fire Department

- Location of Midway in Bullock County, Alabama.
- Coordinates: 32°04′35″N 85°31′28″W
- Country: United States
- State: Alabama
- County: Bullock

Area
  - Total: 3.31 sq mi (8.57 km^{2})
  - Land: 3.31 sq mi (8.57 km^{2})
  - Water: 0 sq mi (0.00 km^{2})
- Elevation: 541 ft (165 m)

Population (2020)
  - Total: 421
  - Density: 127.2/sq mi (49.12/km^{2})
- Time zone: UTC-6 (Central (CST))
  - Summer (DST): UTC-5 (CDT)
- Postal code: 36053
- FIPS code: 01-48424
- GNIS feature ID: 2406161

Midway is a town located in eastern Bullock County, Alabama, United States. At the 2020 census, the population was 421.

== Geography ==
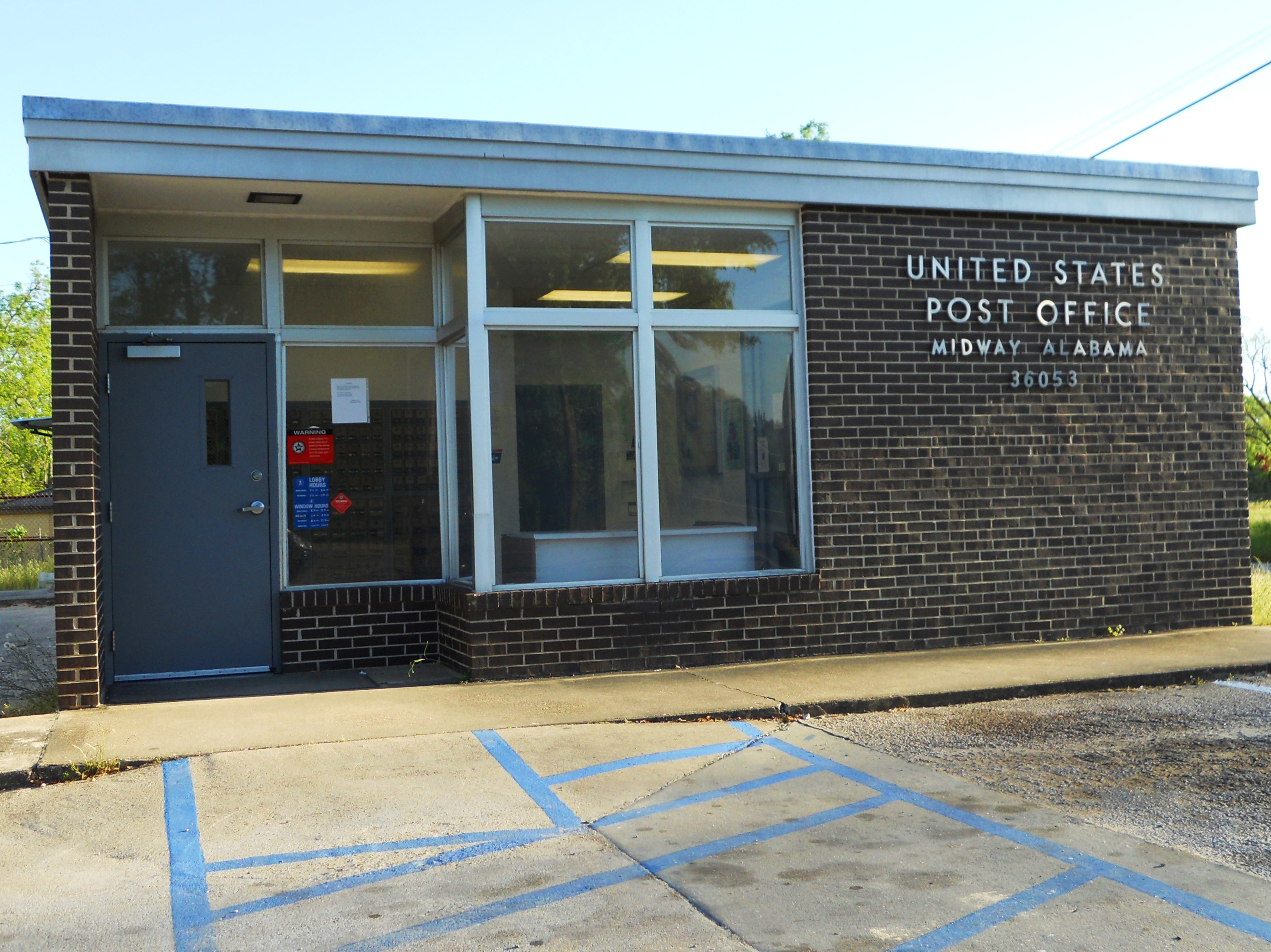
Midway Post Office (ZIP Code:36053), April 2011

Midway is located in eastern Bullock County on U.S. Route 82, the Jefferson Davis Highway, 13 miles (21 km) east of Union Springs, the county seat. It is 27 miles (43 km) east to Eufaula via US-82. Alabama State Route 51 leads south 16 miles (26 km) to Clayton.

According to the U.S. Census Bureau, the town has a total area of 1.6 square miles (4.1 km^{2}), all land.

== Demographics ==
Historical population
Census	Pop.	Note	%±
1880	450		—
1890	612		36.0%
1900	430		−29.7%
1910	464		7.9%
1920	524		12.9%
1930	710		35.5%
1940	617		−13.1%
1950	544		−11.8%
1960	594		9.2%
1970	558		−6.1%
1980	593		6.3%
1990	455		−23.3%
2000	457		0.4%
2010	499		9.2%
2020	421		−15.6%
U.S. Decennial Census; 2013 Estimate

=== 2020 census ===
Midway town, Alabama – Demographic Profile (NH = Non-Hispanic) Note: the US Census treats Hispanic/Latino as an ethnic category. This table excludes Latinos from the racial categories and assigns them to a separate category. Hispanics/Latinos may be of any race.
Race / Ethnicity	Pop 2010	Pop 2020	% 2010	% 2020
White alone (NH)	53	18	10.62%	4.28%
Black or African American alone (NH)	441	394	88.38%	93.59%
Native American or Alaska Native alone (NH)	0	0	0.00%	0.00%
Asian alone (NH)	0	0	0.00%	0.00%
Pacific Islander alone (NH)	0	0	0.00%	0.00%
Some Other Race alone (NH)	0	1	0.00%	0.24%
Mixed Race/Multi-Racial (NH)	2	4	0.40%	0.95%
Hispanic or Latino (any race)	3	4	0.60%	0.95%
Total	499	421	100.00%	100.00%

=== 2000 census ===
As of the census of 2000, there were 457 people, 189 households, and 124 families residing in the town. The population density was 290.3 inhabitants per square mile (112.1/km^{2}). There were 230 housing units at an average density of 146.1 per square mile (56.4/km^{2}). The racial makeup of the town was 88.84% Black or African American and 11.16% White. 0.22% of the population were Hispanic or Latino of any race.

There were 189 households, out of which 34.4% had children under the age of 18 living with them, 26.5% were married couples living together, 37.0% had a female householder with no husband present, and 33.9% were non-families. 31.7% of all households were made up of individuals, and 12.7% had someone living alone who was 65 years of age or older. The average household size was 2.42 and the average family size was 3.06.

In the town, the age distribution of the population shows 29.8% under the age of 18, 9.6% from 18 to 24, 23.4% from 25 to 44, 21.9% from 45 to 64, and 15.3% who were 65 years of age or older. The median age was 35 years. For every 100 females, there were 71.2 males. For every 100 females age 18 and over, there were 63.8 males.

The median income for a household in the town was $12,143, and the median income for a family was $19,063. Males had a median income of $25,938 versus $18,750 for females. The per capita income for the town was $9,036. About 38.1% of families and 42.5% of the population were below the poverty line, including 52.4% of those under age 18 and 45.0% of those age 65 or over.

== Old Merritt School ==
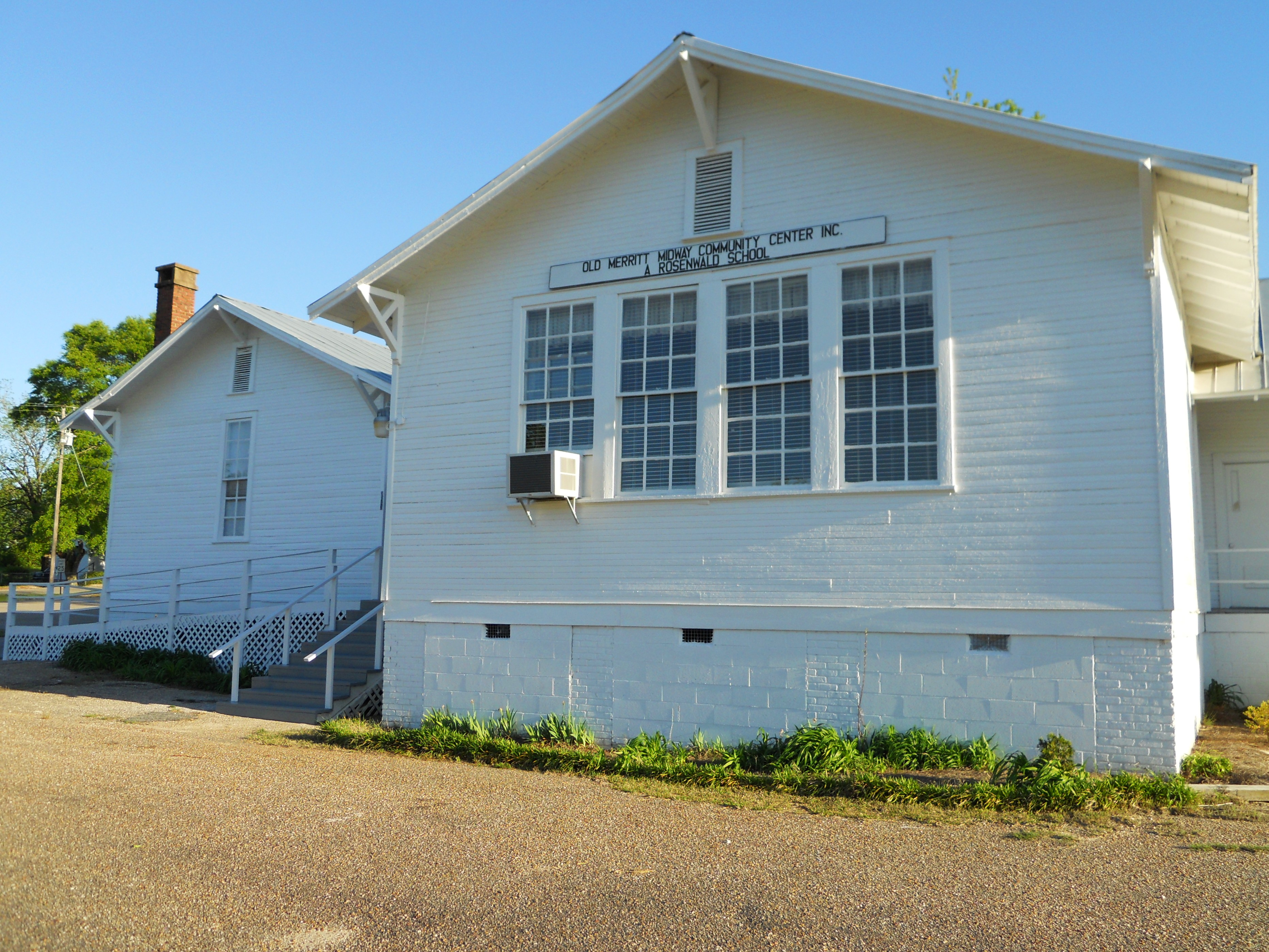
Merritt School

Margaret Elizabeth Merritt of Midway sold two acres for $5 to the State of Alabama in 1921 as a site for an elementary school for African-American children. Built in 1922 with matching Rosenwald funds, the Midway Colored Public School featured oak and pine construction and two classrooms divided by a partition. The building is one of the few surviving of the more than 5,000 rural black schools built with contributions for the Julius Rosenwald Fund. The building was enlarged twice then renovated in 1978. It is now used as a community center. It was added to the Alabama Register of Landmarks and Heritage on November 2, 1990, and the National Register of Historic Places on February 20, 1998.

The school is located in Bullock County, which has the highest illiteracy rate of any county in Alabama.

== Notable people ==
- Johnny Ford, mayor of Tuskegee, Alabama
- Jerrel Jernigan, wide receiver for the New York Giants
- Jesse Lee Peterson, media personality, minister and author
- Harold Pierce, founded the Harold's Chicken Shack restaurant chain in Chicago
- Bobby Turner, Denver Broncos running back coach

== See also ==
- List of towns in Alabama
