= Louisville, Alabama =

- Town
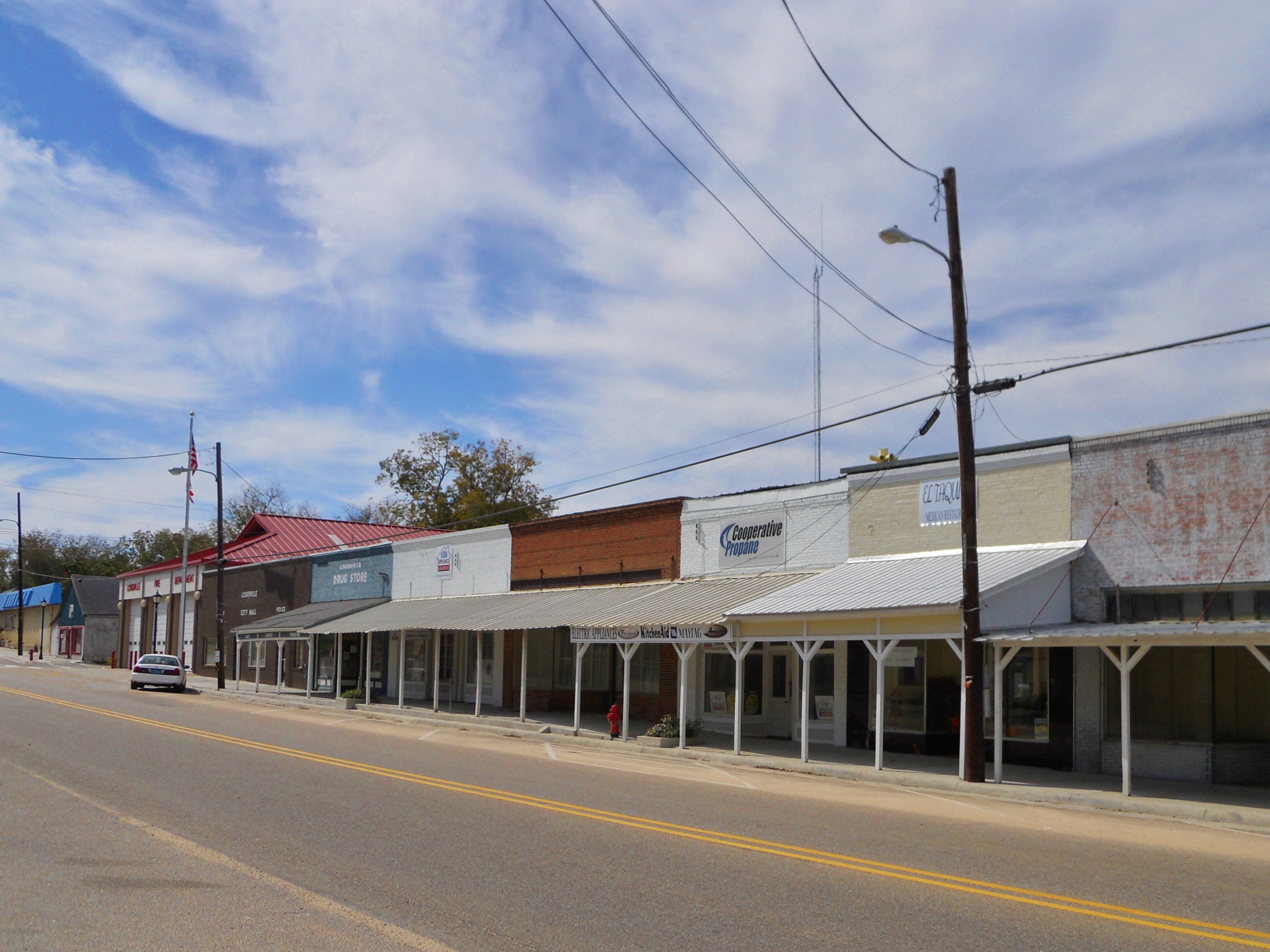
- Downtown Louisville

- Location of Louisville in Barbour County, Alabama.
- Coordinates: 31°46′52″N 85°33′30″W
- Country: United States
- State: Alabama
- County: Barbour

Area
  - Total: 2.75 sq mi (7.12 km^{2})
  - Land: 2.75 sq mi (7.12 km^{2})
  - Water: 0 sq mi (0.00 km^{2})
- Elevation: 541 ft (165 m)

Population (2020)
  - Total: 395
  - Density: 143.7/sq mi (55.49/km^{2})
- Time zone: UTC-6 (Central (CST))
  - Summer (DST): UTC-5 (CDT)
- ZIP code: 36048
- Area code: 334
- FIPS code: 01-44344
- GNIS feature ID: 2406049
- Website: louisvillealabama.gov

Louisville (/ˈluːɪsvɪl/; formerly Lewisville and still pronounced as such) is a town in Barbour County, Alabama, United States. Founded in 1817 in former Creek territory, it holds the distinctive honor of having served as county seat for two different Alabama counties - Pike County (1821) and later Barbour County (1832–1834). Known historically as "Little Scotland" due to its Scotch-Irish settlers.

The population was 395 as of the 2020 census.

== Geography ==
Louisville is 10 miles (16 km) southwest of Clayton, the county seat, and 6 miles (10 km) northeast of Clio.

According to the U.S. Census Bureau, the town has a total area of 2.8 square miles (7.1 km^{2}), all land.

== History ==
Louisville was established in 1817 in former Creek territory. The town holds a unique place in Alabama's administrative history as one of few municipalities to serve as county seat for multiple counties.

It first became the county seat of Pike County in 1821, demonstrating its early importance in the region. When Barbour County was created from portions of Pike and Henry counties, Louisville was chosen as its first county seat, serving from 1832 until 1834, when the seat was relocated to Clayton. This dual role as county seat for two different counties reflects Louisville's significant role in southeast Alabama's early development.

The town's economic development was significantly influenced by the arrival of the Central of Georgia Railroad in 1888. The lumber industry, established in 1828, became a cornerstone of the local economy and continues to play an important role today. The town marked its entry into the automotive age with its first automobile in 1908.

== Demographics ==
Historical population
Census	Pop.	Note	%±
1880	211		—
1890	288		36.5%
1900	416		44.4%
1910	483		16.1%
1920	504		4.3%
1930	587		16.5%
1940	662		12.8%
1950	622		−6.0%
1960	890		43.1%
1970	785		−11.8%
1980	791		0.8%
1990	728		−8.0%
2000	612		−15.9%
2010	519		−15.2%
2020	395		−23.9%
U.S. Decennial Census; 2013 Estimate

=== 2020 census ===
Louisville racial composition
Race	Num.	Perc.
White (non-Hispanic)	193	48.86%
Black or African American (non-Hispanic)	171	43.29%
Asian	1	0.25%
Other/Mixed	9	2.28%
Hispanic or Latino	21	5.32%

As of the 2020 United States census, there were 395 people, 238 households, and 141 families residing in the town.

=== 2000 census ===
At the 2000 census there were 612 people, 242 households, and 168 families in the town. The population density was 222.8 inhabitants per square mile (86.0/km^{2}). There were 271 housing units at an average density of 98.6 per square mile (38.1/km^{2}). The racial makeup of the town was 52.94% White, 40.69% Black or African American, 0.65% Native American, 5.23% from other races, and 0.49% from two or more races. 6.37% of the population were Hispanic or Latino of any race. Of the 242 households, 26.9% had children under the age of 18 living with them, 52.5% were married couples living together, 14.0% had a female householder with no husband present, and 30.2% were non-families. 26.9% of households were one person and 16.5% were one person aged 65 or older. The average household size was 2.53 and the average family size was 3.05.

The age distribution was 23.7% under the age of 18, 10.6% from 18 to 24, 23.2% from 25 to 44, 22.1% from 45 to 64, and 20.4% 65 or older. The median age was 39 years. For every 100 females, there were 87.7 males. For every 100 females age 18 and over, there were 85.3 males.

The median household income was $20,859 and the median family income was $27,014. Males had a median income of $27,500 versus $24,583 for females. The per capita income for the town was $13,151. About 22.4% of families and 28.0% of the population were below the poverty line, including 22.0% of those under age 18 and 34.8% of those age 65 or over.

== Government ==
Louisville operates under a mayor-council form of government. The city council consists of five members elected from single-member districts, each serving four-year terms. The council is responsible for adopting ordinances, setting policy, and appropriating city funds. The mayor is elected at large to a four-year term.

As of November 2025, the mayor of Louisville is Mark Andrews, who was elected in the 2025 municipal election following the retirement of James B. Grant. Grant served in Louisville municipal office from 1960 to 2025, first as a member of the city council from 1960 to 1986 and then as mayor from 1986 to 2025.

=== State and Federal Representation ===
==== U.S. Congressional District: 2nd District ====
- Current Representative: Shomari Figures

==== Alabama State Legislature ====
- Senate District 28: William Beasley
- House District 84: Berry Forte

==== U.S. Senate Representation ====
- Senator Katie Britt
- Senator Tommy Tuberville

== Notable people ==
- Robert H. Bennett, member of the Alabama House of Representatives
- George M. Grant, former U.S. Representative
- Jeremiah Norman Williams, U.S. Representative from Alabama's 2nd congressional district from 1875 to 1877
- James B. Grant, longtime Louisville mayor and city council member, served 65 years in municipal office, including 39 years as mayor.

== Gallery ==
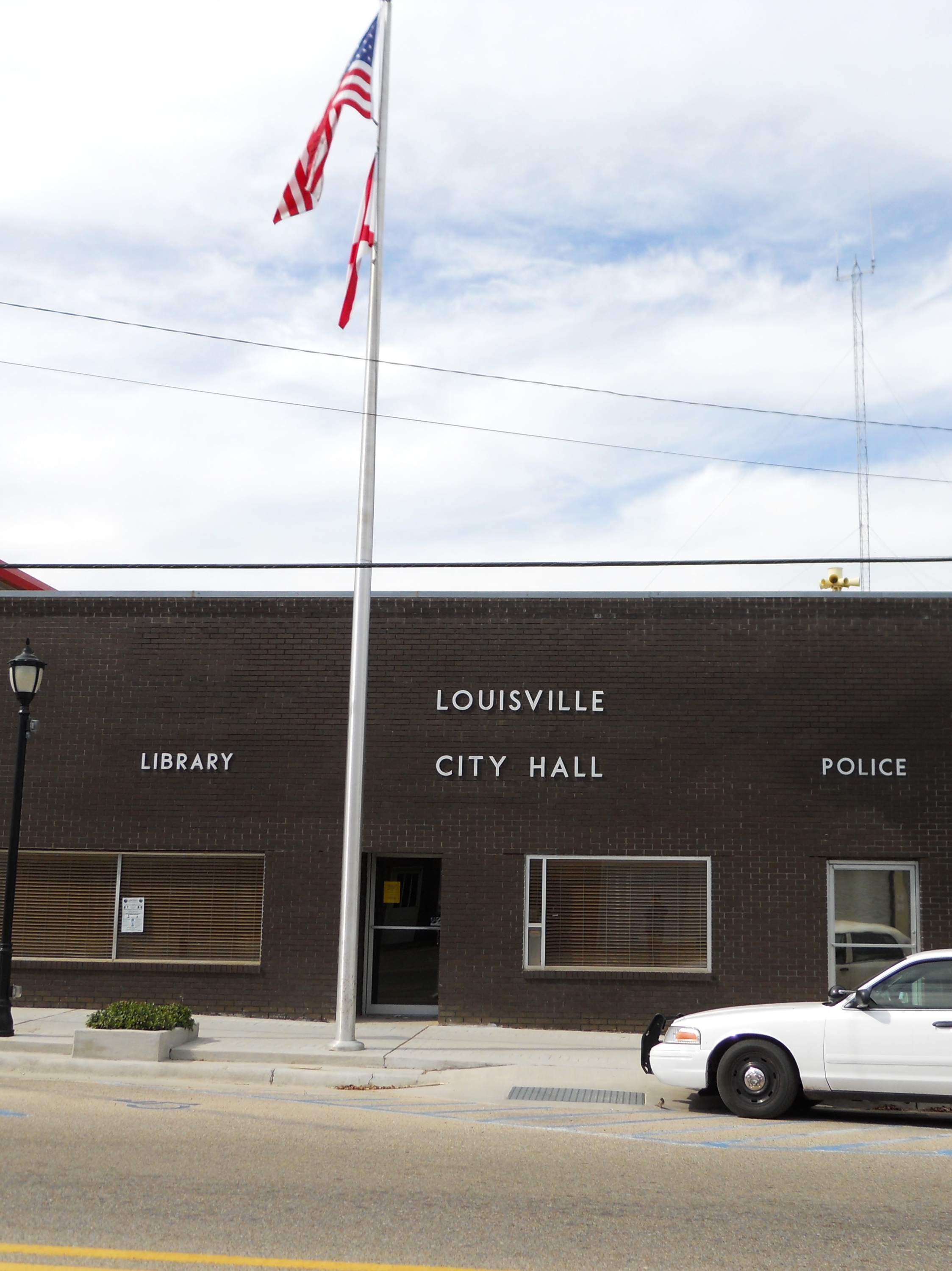
The Louisville City Hall, Police Department, and Public Library

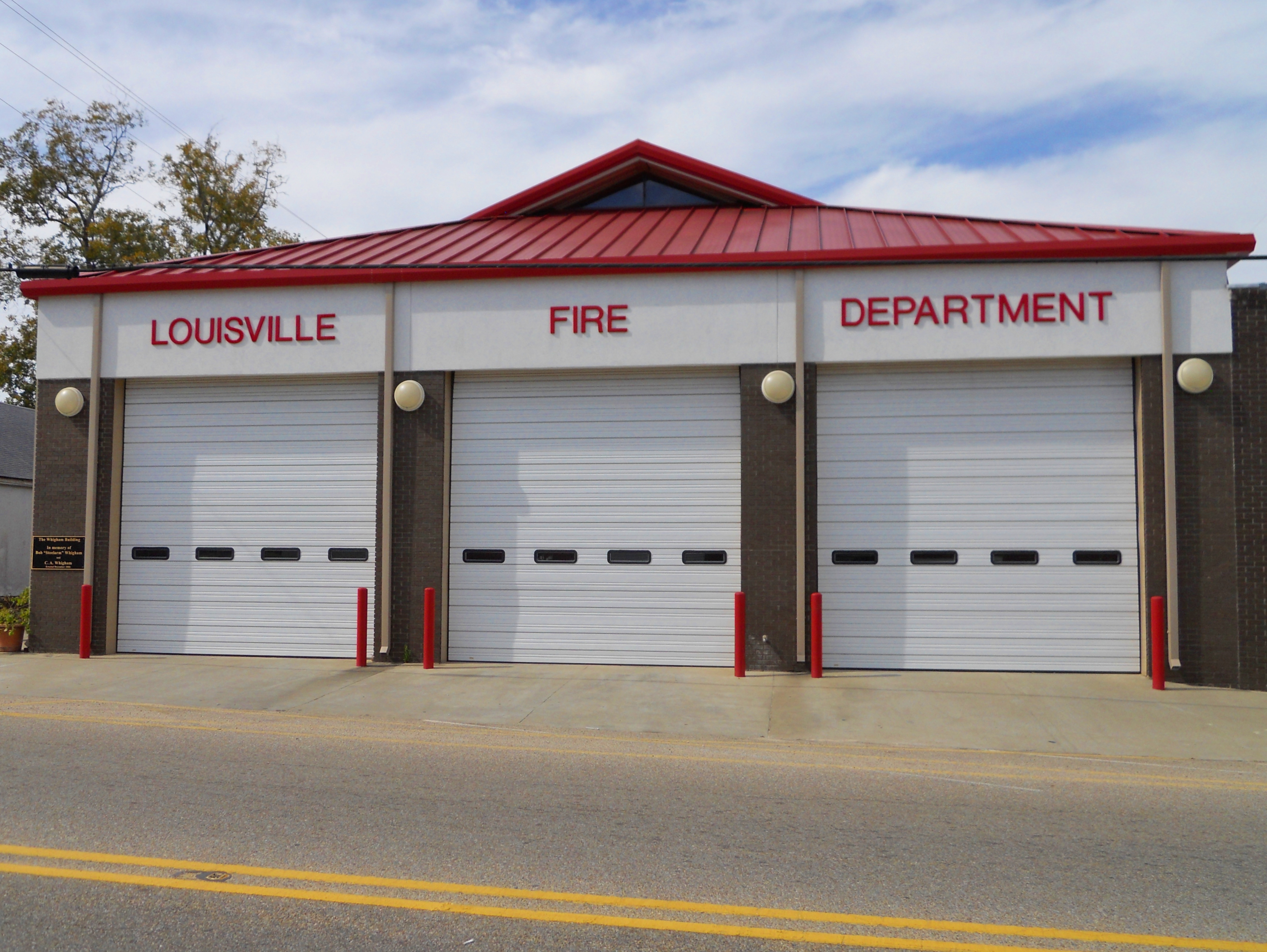
Louisville Fire Department

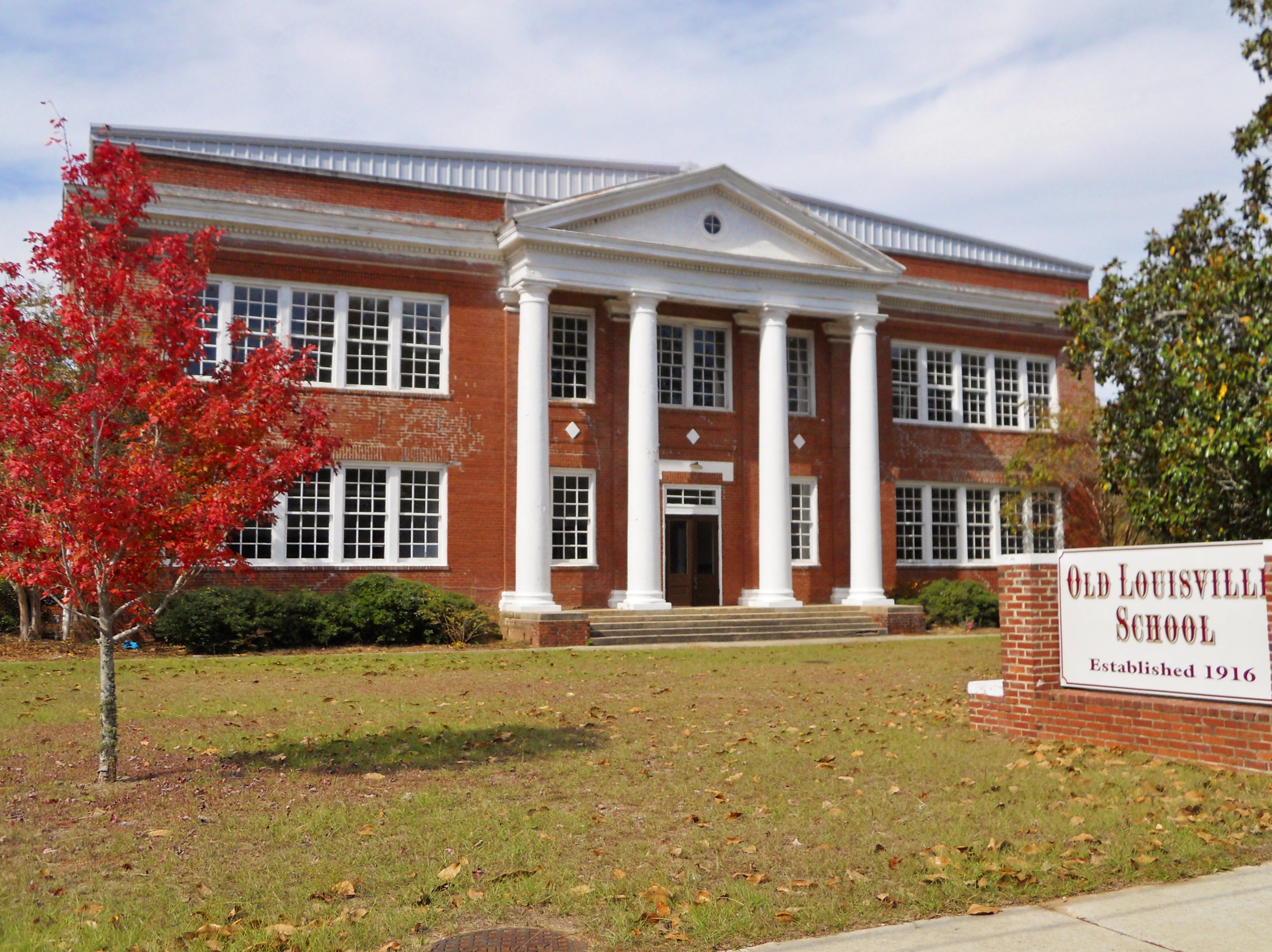
The Old Louisville School (established 1916)

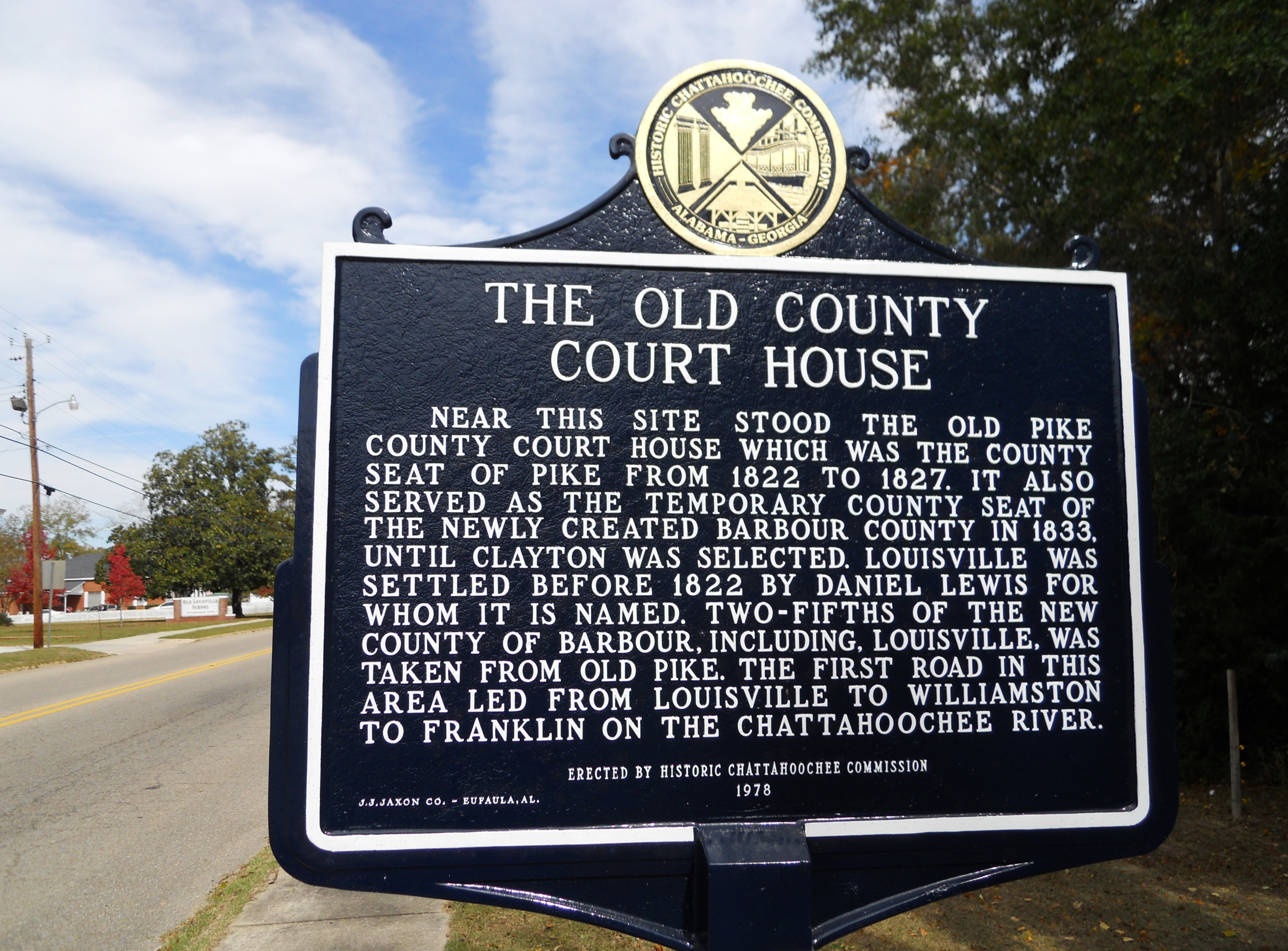
This historic marker denotes the former location of the Pike/Barbour County courthouse in Louisville.
