= Barbour County, Alabama =

County in Alabama, United States

- County
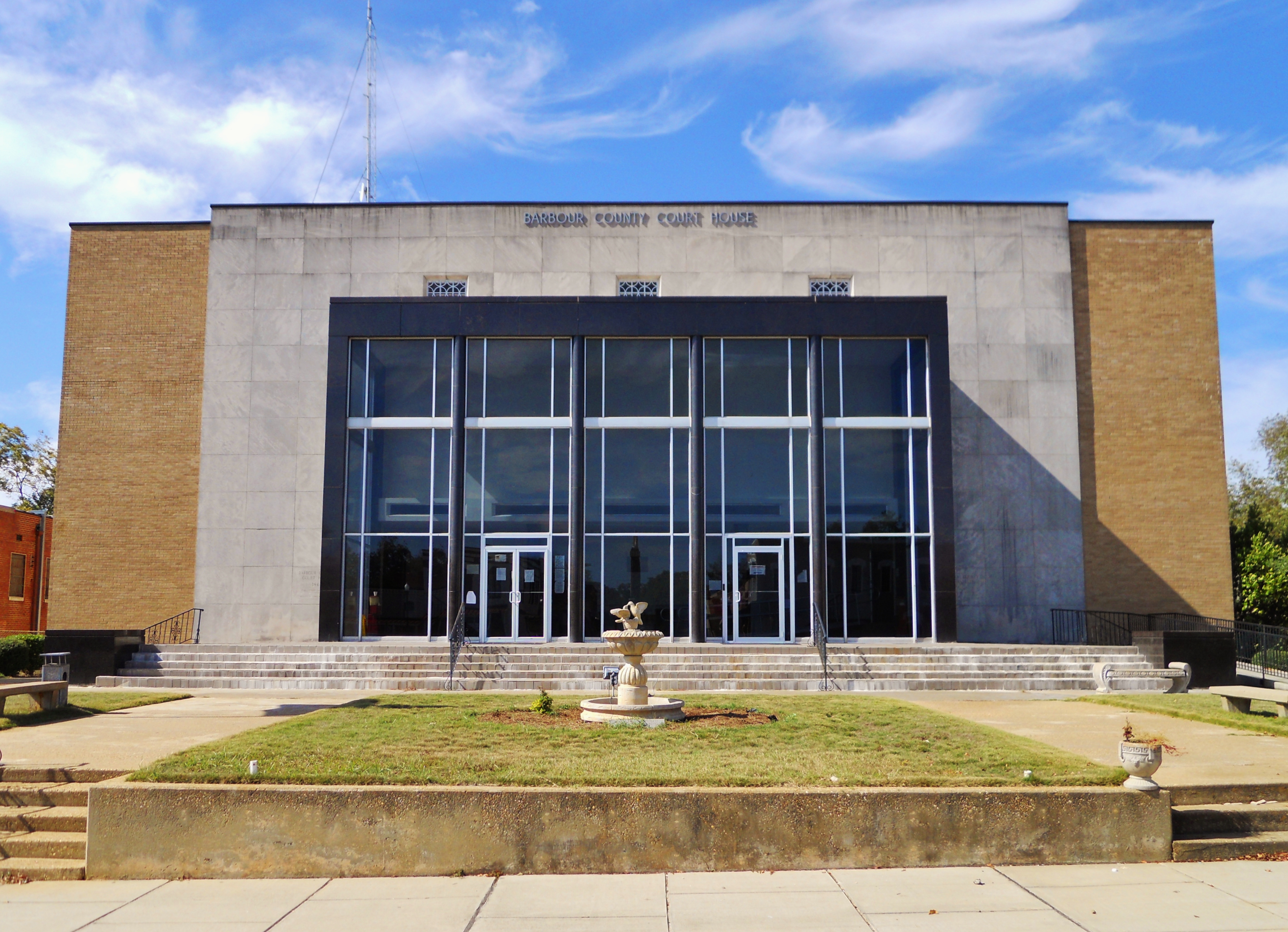
- Barbour County Courthouse in Clayton

- Location within the U.S. state of Alabama
- Coordinates: 31°51′57″N 85°23′46″W
- Country: United States
- State: Alabama
- Founded: December 18, 1832
- Named for: James Barbour
- Seat: Clayton
- Largest city: Eufaula

Area
  - Total: 905 sq mi (2,340 km^{2})
  - Land: 885 sq mi (2,290 km^{2})
  - Water: 20 sq mi (52 km^{2}) 2.2%

Population (2020)
  - Total: 25,223
  - Estimate (2025): 24,607 ▼
  - Density: 28.5/sq mi (11.0/km^{2})
- Time zone: UTC−6 (Central)
  - Summer (DST): UTC−5 (CDT)
- Congressional district: 2nd
- Website: www.barbourcountyal.gov
- County Number 06 on Alabama License Plates

Barbour County is a county in the southeastern part of the U.S. state of Alabama, located in the Alabama Black Belt Region. As of the 2020 census, the population was 25,223. Its county seat is Clayton. Its largest city is Eufaula. Its name is in honor of James Barbour, who served as Governor of Virginia.

== History ==
Barbour County was established on December 18, 1832, from former Muscogee homelands and a portion of Pike County. Between the years of 1763 and 1783 the area which is now Barbour County was part of the colony of British West Florida. After 1783 the region fell under the jurisdiction of the newly created United States of America. The Muscogee Creek Confederacy was removed to territory west of the Mississippi River. The fertile land was developed by southern migrants as large cotton plantations dependent on slave labor. Due to the number of slaves, the population was soon majority black, a proportion that continued for decades. In the 21st century, the population has a slight white majority, but blacks make up more than 46% of the residents, which results in highly competitive politics.

In 1833, Louisville was chosen as the first county seat for Barbour County. The county seat was moved in 1834, after an eleven-member committee selected Clayton because of its central geographic location. Its boundaries were altered in 1866 and 1868. The Election Riot of 1874 occurred near Comer.

By the 1870s, the city of Eufaula had surpassed Clayton in size, sparking debate about whether the county seat should be moved to the county's commercial center or remain at its geographic center. Reaching a compromise, the legislature passed Act No. 106 on February 12, 1879, to establish county courts in both Eufaula and Clayton. Today, two county courthouses continue to operate in Barbour County.

== Geography ==
According to the United States Census Bureau, the county has a total area of 905 square miles (2,340 km^{2}), of which 885 square miles (2,290 km^{2}) is land and 20 square miles (52 km^{2}) (2.2%) is water. The county is located within the Wiregrass region of southeast Alabama.

=== Major highways ===
- U.S. Highway 82 / State Route 6 (unsigned)
- U.S. Highway 431 / State Route 1 (unsigned)
- State Route 10
- State Route 30
- State Route 51
- State Route 95
- State Route 130
- State Route 131
- State Route 165
- State Route 198
- State Route 239
- State Route 285

=== Adjacent counties ===
- Russell County - northeast
- Quitman County, Georgia - east
- Stewart County, Georgia - east
- Clay County, Georgia - southeast
- Henry County - south
- Dale County - south
- Pike County - west
- Bullock County - northwest

=== National protected area ===
- Eufaula National Wildlife Refuge (part)

== Demographics ==
Historical population
Census	Pop.	Note	%±
1840	12,024		—
1850	23,632		96.5%
1860	30,812		30.4%
1870	29,309		−4.9%
1880	33,979		15.9%
1890	34,898		2.7%
1900	35,152		0.7%
1910	32,728		−6.9%
1920	32,067		−2.0%
1930	32,425		1.1%
1940	32,722		0.9%
1950	28,892		−11.7%
1960	24,700		−14.5%
1970	22,543		−8.7%
1980	24,756		9.8%
1990	25,417		2.7%
2000	29,038		14.2%
2010	27,457		−5.4%
2020	25,223		−8.1%
2025 (est.)	24,607	▼	−2.4%
U.S. Decennial Census; 1790–1960 1900–1990; 1990–2000 2010–2020

=== Racial and ethnic composition ===
Barbour County, Alabama – Racial and ethnic composition Note: the US Census treats Hispanic/Latino as an ethnic category. This table excludes Latinos from the racial categories and assigns them to a separate category. Hispanics/Latinos may be of any race.
Race / Ethnicity (NH = Non-Hispanic)	Pop 2000	Pop 2010	Pop 2020	% 2000	% 2010	% 2020
White alone (NH)	14,788	12,837	11,086	50.93%	46.75%	43.95%
Black or African American alone (NH)	13,369	12,820	11,850	46.04%	46.69%	46.98%
Native American or Alaska Native alone (NH)	119	60	58	0.41%	0.22%	0.23%
Asian alone (NH)	83	107	103	0.29%	0.39%	0.41%
Pacific Islander alone (NH)	6	24	0	0.02%	0.09%	0.00%
Other race alone (NH)	4	13	63	0.01%	0.05%	0.25%
Mixed race or Multiracial (NH)	191	209	553	0.66%	0.76%	2.19%
Hispanic or Latino (any race)	478	1,387	1,510	1.65%	5.05%	5.99%
Total	29,038	27,457	25,223	100.00%	100.00%	100.00%

=== 2020 Census ===
As of the 2020 census, the county had a population of 25,223. The median age was 42.9 years. 20.2% of residents were under the age of 18 and 20.2% of residents were 65 years of age or older. For every 100 females there were 109.2 males, and for every 100 females age 18 and over there were 112.0 males age 18 and over.

The racial makeup of the county was 44.9% White, 47.3% Black or African American, 0.5% American Indian and Alaska Native, 0.5% Asian, 0.0% Native Hawaiian and Pacific Islander, 4.1% from some other race, and 2.8% from two or more races. Hispanic or Latino residents of any race comprised 6.0% of the population.

34.1% of residents lived in urban areas, while 65.9% lived in rural areas.

There were 9,677 households in the county, of which 28.6% had children under the age of 18 living with them and 38.2% had a female householder with no spouse or partner present. About 33.3% of all households were made up of individuals and 15.7% had someone living alone who was 65 years of age or older.

There were 11,618 housing units, of which 16.7% were vacant. Among occupied housing units, 64.0% were owner-occupied and 36.0% were renter-occupied. The homeowner vacancy rate was 1.8% and the rental vacancy rate was 6.4%.

=== 2010 census ===
As of the 2010 United States census, there were 27,457 people living in the county. 48.0% were White, 46.9% Black or African American, 0.4% Native American, 0.4% Asian, 0.1% Pacific Islander, 3.3% of some other race and 0.9% of two or more races. 5.1% were Hispanic or Latino (of any race).

=== 2000 census ===
As of the census of 2000, there were 29,038 people, 10,409 households, and 7,390 families living in the county. The population density was 33 people per square mile (13 people/km^{2}). There were 12,461 housing units at an average density of 14 units per square mile (5.4 units/km^{2}). The racial makeup of the county was 51.27% White, 46.32% Black or African American, 0.45% Native American, 0.29% Asian, 0.03% Pacific Islander, 0.91% from other races, and 0.73% from two or more races. 1.65% of the population were Hispanic or Latino of any race. There were 670 people who spoke Spanish in their home. The only other language with over 100 speakers was French at 105.

In 2005 Barbour County had a population that was 49.5% non-Hispanic whites. 46.8% of the population was African-American. 0.3% of the population reported more than one race. Latinos were now 3.1% of the population. 0.4% were Native American and 0.3% were Asian. (Sources census quickfacts)

In 2000 There were 10,409 households, out of which 33.30% had children under the age of 18 living with them, 47.90% were married couples living together, 19.10% had a female householder with no husband present, and 29.00% were non-families. 26.50% of all households were made up of individuals, and 12.10% had someone living alone who was 65 years of age or older. The average household size was 2.53 and the average family size was 3.04.

In the county, the population was spread out, with 25.40% under the age of 18, 9.30% from 18 to 24, 29.60% from 25 to 44, 22.40% from 45 to 64, and 13.30% who were 65 years of age or older. The median age was 36 years. For every 100 females there were 106.40 males. For every 100 females age 18 and over, there were 106.80 males.

The median income for a household in the county was $25,101, and the median income for a family was $31,877. Males had a median income of $28,441 versus $19,882 for females. The per capita income for the county was $13,316. About 21.60% of families and 26.80% of the population were below the poverty line, including 37.10% of those under age 18 and 26.40% of those age 65 or over.

In 2000, the largest denominational groups were Evangelical Protestants (with 8,935 adherents) and Mainline Protestants (with 2,492 adherents). The largest religious bodies were The Southern Baptist Convention (with 7,576 members) and The United Methodist Church (with 1,811 members).

== Education ==
Barbour County contains two public school districts. There are approximately 7,100 students in public K-12 schools in Barbour County.

The county contains one public higher education institution. Wallace Community College operates a campus located in Eufaula.

=== Districts ===
School districts include:

- Barbour County School District
- Eufaula City School District

== Politics ==
Having been a historically Democratic county for much of the 20th century, the county has become more competitive. It has now voted for the Republican presidential candidate in five of the last six elections.

United States presidential election results for Barbour County, Alabama
Year	Republican		Democratic		Third party(ies)	
Year	No.	%	No.	%	No.	%
1836	320	52.37%	291	47.63%	0	0.00%
1840	1,028	61.56%	642	38.44%	0	0.00%
1844	1,113	56.41%	860	43.59%	0	0.00%
1848	1,205	66.25%	614	33.75%	0	0.00%
1852	297	25.23%	309	26.25%	571	48.51%
1856	0	0.00%	1,445	62.77%	857	37.23%
1860	0	0.00%	6	0.25%	2,359	99.75%
1868	3,168	58.91%	2,210	41.09%	0	0.00%
1872	2,756	54.29%	2,320	45.71%	0	0.00%
1876	162	4.31%	3,594	95.69%	0	0.00%
1880	1,200	30.35%	2,753	69.63%	1	0.03%
1884	700	24.77%	2,122	75.09%	4	0.14%
1888	452	11.35%	3,530	88.65%	0	0.00%
1892	19	0.34%	4,315	77.40%	1,241	22.26%
1896	1,437	32.38%	2,657	59.87%	344	7.75%
1900	272	8.98%	2,714	89.57%	44	1.45%
1904	49	3.40%	1,356	94.04%	37	2.57%
1908	43	3.06%	1,303	92.81%	58	4.13%
1912	18	1.41%	1,155	90.38%	105	8.22%
1916	45	3.45%	1,235	94.64%	25	1.92%
1920	203	11.37%	1,568	87.79%	15	0.84%
1924	78	5.33%	1,340	91.59%	45	3.08%
1928	845	35.59%	1,506	63.44%	23	0.97%
1932	64	2.81%	2,207	96.88%	7	0.31%
1936	50	2.04%	2,386	97.47%	12	0.49%
1940	90	3.71%	2,328	95.88%	10	0.41%
1944	67	2.84%	2,237	94.91%	53	2.25%
1948	101	5.65%	0	0.00%	1,687	94.35%
1952	798	26.16%	2,250	73.77%	2	0.07%
1956	777	22.53%	2,530	73.35%	142	4.12%
1960	1,166	34.99%	2,148	64.47%	18	0.54%
1964	3,853	79.76%	0	0.00%	978	20.24%
1968	386	4.86%	1,898	23.89%	5,662	71.26%
1972	4,985	70.92%	1,846	26.26%	198	2.82%
1976	3,758	43.25%	4,730	54.43%	202	2.32%
1980	4,171	46.34%	4,458	49.53%	372	4.13%
1984	5,459	53.73%	4,591	45.18%	111	1.09%
1988	4,958	55.71%	3,836	43.11%	105	1.18%
1992	4,475	42.90%	4,836	46.36%	1,120	10.74%
1996	3,627	40.51%	4,787	53.47%	539	6.02%
2000	5,096	49.02%	5,188	49.91%	111	1.07%
2004	5,899	54.74%	4,832	44.84%	46	0.43%
2008	5,866	50.44%	5,697	48.99%	67	0.58%
2012	5,550	48.19%	5,912	51.33%	55	0.48%
2016	5,454	52.10%	4,871	46.53%	144	1.38%
2020	5,622	53.45%	4,816	45.79%	80	0.76%
2024	5,606	56.88%	4,158	42.19%	91	0.92%

United States Senate election results for Barbour County, Alabama2
Year	Republican		Democratic		Third party(ies)	
Year	No.	%	No.	%	No.	%
2020	5,449	52.00%	5,021	47.91%	9	0.09%

United States Senate election results for Barbour County, Alabama3
Year	Republican		Democratic		Third party(ies)	
Year	No.	%	No.	%	No.	%
2022	3,861	59.01%	2,620	40.04%	62	0.95%

Alabama Gubernatorial election results for Barbour County
Year	Republican		Democratic		Third party(ies)	
Year	No.	%	No.	%	No.	%
2022	3,888	59.38%	2,549	38.93%	111	1.70%

== Communities ==
=== Cities ===
- Clio
- Eufaula

=== Towns ===
- Bakerhill
- Blue Springs
- Clayton (County Seat)
- Louisville

=== Unincorporated communities ===
- Batesville
- Elamville
- Spring Hill

== Places of interest ==
Barbour County is home to Lakepoint Resort State Park, Blue Springs State Park, and the Eufaula National Wildlife Refuge.

== Notable people ==
=== Governors from Barbour County ===
As a center of the planter elite class, Barbour County has produced more Alabama governors than any other county in the state. Six elected governors as well as two acting governors have lived in the county. In 2000, the Barbour County Governors' Trail was established by an act of the Alabama Legislature to honor the eight distinguished men and women who have served as governor from the county.

Marking changes in 20th-century politics, Chauncey Sparks, the Wallaces, and Jere Beasley were not from the planter elite.

Alabama governors from Barbour County
Name	In Office	Hometown
John Gill Shorter	1861–1863	Eufaula, AL
William Dorsey Jelks	1901–1907	Eufaula, AL
Braxton Bragg Comer	1907–1911	Spring Hill, AL
Charles S. McDowell	July 10,11, 1924	Eufaula, AL
Chauncey Sparks	1943–1947	Eufaula, AL
George Corley Wallace	1963–1967, 1971–1979, 1983–1987	Clio, AL
Jere Beasley	June 5 – July 7, 1972	Clayton, AL

== See also ==
- National Register of Historic Places listings in Barbour County, Alabama
- Properties on the Alabama Register of Landmarks and Heritage in Barbour County, Alabama
