= List of Alabama state parks =

Map of Alabama state parks

This list of Alabama state parks covers state parks in the Alabama park system. As of 2023, there were 21 official Alabama state parks run in part or exclusively by the Alabama Department of Conservation and Natural Resources and three historic state parks run by other authorities.

== Current parks ==
State parks under direct state management
| Name | County | Size | | Estab- lished | River / lake | Image | Remarks |
| Name | County | acres | ha | Estab- lished | River / lake | Image | Remarks |
|---|---|---|---|---|---|---|---|
| Blue Springs State Park | Barbour | 103 | 42 | 1963 | Blue Springs | | Near Clio; swimming in natural spring, camping, picnicking |
| Buck's Pocket State Park | DeKalb, Jackson, Marshall | 2,000 | 810 | 1971 | Lake Guntersville | | Near Grove Oak; scenic vistas, camping, hiking and equestrian trails |
| Cathedral Caverns State Park | Marshall | 461 | 187 | 1987 | --- | Stalagmites | Located near Grant; cave tours, tent camping |
| Cheaha State Park | Clay, Cleburne | 2,799 | 1,133 | 1933 | Cheaha Lake | Stone tower | State's highest point; scenic views, hiking, camping |
| Chewacla State Park | Lee | 696 | 282 | 1939 | Lake Chewacla | Dashing waterfalls | Located in Auburn; fishing, swimming, non-motorized boating, hiking, camping, cabins |
| DeSoto State Park | Cherokee, DeKalb | 3,502 | 1,417 | 1939 | Little River | Pouring waterfalls | Located on Lookout Mountain; camping, lodging, picnicking, hiking and biking trails |
| Frank Jackson State Park | Covington | 2,050 | 830 | 1970 | Lake Frank Jackson | | Boating, fishing, swimming, picnicking, camping |
| Gulf State Park | Baldwin | 6,150 | 2,490 | 1939 | Gulf of Mexico, Lake Shelby | White sands with surf | Fresh and saltwater fishing and swimming, 18-hole golf course, camping |
| Joe Wheeler State Park | Lauderdale, Lawrence | 2,550 | 1,030 | 1949 | Wheeler Lake | View of Wheeler lake | Near Rogersville; lodge, campground, marina, hiking and biking trail, 18-hole golf course |
| Lake Guntersville State Park | Marshall | 6,000 | 2,400 | 1947 | Guntersville Lake | | Resort complex, cottages, campground, 18-hole golf course, hiking, fishing |
| Lake Lurleen State Park | Tuscaloosa | 1,675 | 678 | 1952 | Lake Lurleen | | Boating, fishing, swimming, hiking, biking |
| Lakepoint Resort State Park | Barbour | 1,220 | 490 | 1968 | Lake Eufala | | Convention center, 18-hole golf course, lodge, campground, cabins, cottages, marina, hiking, picnicking |
| Meaher State Park | Baldwin | 1,327 | 537 | 1989 | Mobile Bay | Wetlands | Nature trails with wetlands boardwalk through the wetlands, boat ramp, fishing pier, picnicking, camping |
| Monte Sano State Park | Madison | 2,140 | 870 | 1938 | --- | | Wernher von Braun Planetarium; picnicking, hiking, cabins, campground |
| Oak Mountain State Park | Shelby | 9,940 | 4,020 | 1927 | Double Oak Lake | Wildlife center entrance | Alabama Wildlife Center; golf, swimming, hiking, mountain biking, horseback riding, camping, fishing, hunting |
| Rickwood Caverns State Park | Blount | 380 | 150 | 1974 | --- | Illuminated cave pasage | Cave tours, swimming, picnicking, hiking, camping |
| Roland Cooper State Park | Wilcox | 236 | 96 | 1969 | Dannelly Reservoir | | Boating, camping, fishing, hunting |
| Wind Creek State Park | Tallapoosa | 1,445 | 585 | unknown | Lake Martin | | Camping, swimming, boating, fishing, picnicking, hiking, biking |

State parks under shared management
| Name | County | Size | | Estab- lished | Management | River / lake | Image | Remarks |
| Name | County | acres | ha | Estab- lished | Management | River / lake | Image | Remarks |
|---|---|---|---|---|---|---|---|---|
| Bladon Springs State Park | Choctaw | 357 | 144 | 1939 | Choctaw County | --- | Gazebo | Historic spa grounds with mineral springs |
| Chickasaw State Park | Marengo | 520 | 210 | 1935 | Marengo County | --- | | Near David K. Nelson Wildlife Management Area |
| Paul M. Grist State Park | Dallas | 1,080 | 440 | 1930s | Dallas County | Paul Grist Lake | | Swimming, fishing, boating, camping |

== Historic state parks ==
| Name | County | Size | | Estab- lished | Management | River / lake | Image | Remarks |
| Name | County | acres | ha | Estab- lished | Management | River / lake | Image | Remarks |
|---|---|---|---|---|---|---|---|---|
| Historic Blakeley State Park | Baldwin | 1,400 | 570 | 1981 | Historic Blakeley Authority | Tensaw River | Country road | Camping, picnicking, hiking trails |
| Brierfield Ironworks Historical State Park | Bibb | 486 | 197 | 1976 | Alabama Historic Ironworks Commission | Little Cahaba River | Remnants | Industrial ruins, historic buildings, trails, campsites |
| Tannehill Ironworks Historical State Park | Tuscaloosa | 2,063 | 835 | 1969 | Alabama Historic Ironworks Commission | --- | Industrial structure | Preserved industrial sites, Iron & Steel Museum of Alabama, crafts cabins, hiking trails |

== Former state parks ==
| Name | County | Size | | Estab- lished | Management | River / lake | Image | Remarks |
| Name | County | acres | ha | Estab- lished | Management | River / lake | Image | Remarks |
|---|---|---|---|---|---|---|---|---|
| Chattahoochee State Park | Houston | 596 | 241 | 1930s | --- | Irwin's Mill Creek | | Closed permanently after destruction by Hurricane Michael in 2018 |
| Florala City Park | Covington | 40 | 16 | 1909 | City of Florala | Lake Jackson | Lake view | Reverted to local ownership in 2015 |
