= List of Alabama state forests =

The state forests of Alabama are maintained by the Alabama Forestry Commission.

== Current state forests ==
Name	County	Size	Status
Choccolocco	Calhoun	4,536 acres (1,836 ha)	Timber. Part of the Choccolocco Wildlife Management Area, co-managed by the Alabama Department of Conservation and Natural Resources.
Hauss	Escambia	319 acres (129 ha)	Nursery, Timber
Geneva	Geneva	7,120 acres (2,880 ha)	Hunting, Recreational, Timber
Little River	Escambia; Monroe	2,100 acres (850 ha)	Disabled hunting, Recreational, Timber
Macon	Macon	190 acres (77 ha)	Disabled hunting, Timber
Weogufka	Coosa	240 acres (97 ha)	Timber

== Former state forests ==
Name	County	Size	Status
Baldwin State Forest	Baldwin	240 acres (97 ha)	
Crawford State Forest	Mobile	80 acres (32 ha)	
Fayette State Experiment Forest	Fayette	1,332 acres (539 ha)	Defunct, currently known as the Fayette Experimental and Demonstration Forest. Now owned and managed by Auburn University
George Washington State Forest	Covington	20 acres (8.1 ha)	
Miller State Forest Nursery	Autauga	201 acres (81 ha)	
Saint Stephens State Forest	Washington		Sold

== See also ==
- List of national forests of the United States
