= Frank Jackson =

Frank Jackson may refer to:

== Politics ==
- Frank Jackson (Alabama politician) (1915–1983), Alabama politician
- Frank D. Jackson (1854–1938), governor of Iowa 1894–1896
- Frank G. Jackson (born 1946), mayor of Cleveland, Ohio
- John Jackson (South East Derbyshire MP) (Frank John Jackson, 1919–1976), British Conservative Member of Parliament, 1959–1964

== Sports ==
- Frank Jackson (American football) (born 1939), pro wide receiver
- Frank Jackson (basketball) (born 1998), NBA player

== Other ==
- Frank Jackson (outlaw) (1856–?), cowboy and outlaw
- F. H. Jackson (1870–1960), English clergyman and mathematician
- Frank Cameron Jackson (born 1943), professor of philosophy at Australian National University
- Frank E. Jackson Jr. (born 1965), film director, producer, and writer
- Frank Jackson, an alias used by Ramón Mercader (1913–1978), assassin of Leon Trotsky

== See also ==
- Francis Jackson (disambiguation)
