= Chickasaw State Park (Alabama) =

State park in Marengo County, Alabama, United States

- Location within Alabama
- Interactive map of Chickasaw State Park
- Location: Marengo County, Alabama, United States
- Coordinates: 32°21′33″N 87°47′13″W
- Area: 520 acres (210 ha)
- Elevation: 131 ft (40 m)
- Established: 1935–1936
- Administrator: Marengo County and Alabama Department of Conservation and Natural Resources
- Designation: Alabama state park
- Website: Official website

Chickasaw State Park is a 520-acre (210 ha) public recreation area located on U.S. Route 43 four miles (6.4 km) north of Linden in Marengo County, Alabama. The state park offers picnicking, playground, and minimal camping facilities and is a stop on the Alabama Black Belt Birding Trail. It was developed in the 1930s by the Civilian Conservation Corps on property that the state had owned since 1819. It was one of several Alabama state parks that closed or saw curtailment of services following state budget cuts in 2015 then reopened in 2016 in a cooperative arrangement between Marengo County and the State Parks Division of the Alabama Department of Conservation and Natural Resources.
