= Little River State Forest =

State forest in Alabama, United States

- Location within Alabama Location within the United States
- Location: Escambia and Monroe, Alabama, United States
- Coordinates: 31°15′27″N 87°30′14″W
- Area: 2,100 acres (8.5 km^{2})
- Elevation: 161 ft (49 m)
- Established: 1934
- Named for: Little River
- Governing body: Alabama Forestry Commission
- Website: Official website

Little River State Forest is an Alabama state forest in the counties of Escambia and Monroe. The forest is approximately 2,100 acres (850 ha) and sits at an elevation of 161 feet (49 m). The forest had its beginnings in the 1930s, when the property was deeded to the state. In 1934, during the Great Depression, the Civilian Conservation Corps (CCC) began work to create a state park at the site. Many current structures date from the CCC period, including the office building, a cabin, pavilions, a nature trail, and a 25-acre (10 ha) lake. The site is managed and maintained by the Alabama Forestry Commission.
