= Little River Wildlife Management Area =

Little River Wildlife Management Area may refer to:

- Little River Wildlife Management Area, one of the Alabama Wildlife Management Areas
- Little River Wildlife Management Area, on the list of Wildlife Management Areas in Arkansas
- Little River Wildlife Management Area in Charlton and Oxford, Massachusetts
