= Francis Jackson =

Francis Jackson may refer to:

- Francis James Jackson (1770–1814), British diplomat
- Francis Jackson (abolitionist) (1789–1861), abolitionist in Boston, Massachusetts
- Francis Jackson (kidnapping victim) (born 1816 or 1817), a free man sold into slavery leading to the Francis Jackson v. John W. Deshazer court case
- Francis Stanley Jackson (cricketer) (1870–1947), English cricketer, soldier, and Conservative Party politician
- Francis Ernest Jackson (1872–1945), British painter, draughtsman, poster designer, and lithographer
- Francis Jackson (composer) (1917–2022), British organist and composer
- Francis Jackson (footballer) (born 1954), Australian rules footballer
- Francis M. Jackson, attorney

== See also ==
- Frank Jackson (disambiguation)
