= McCalla, Alabama =

- Census-designated place
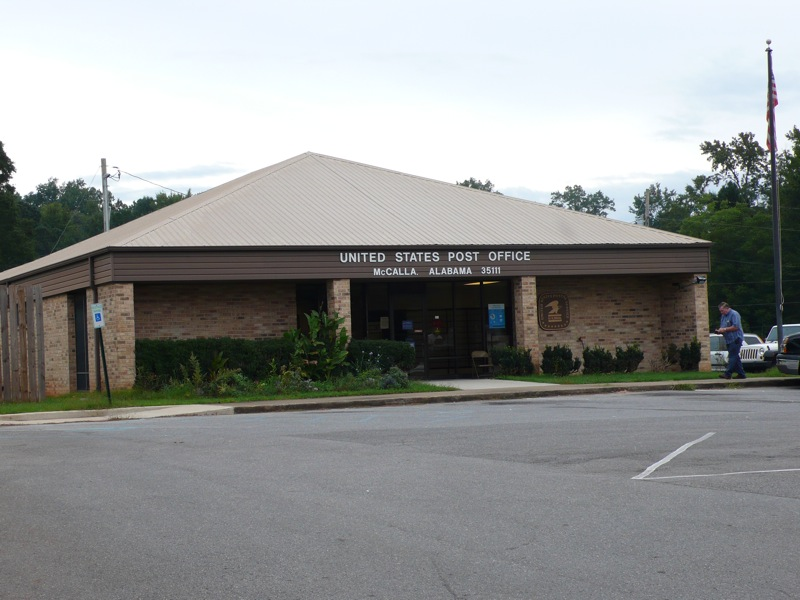
- The U.S. Post Office in McCalla

- Location within Alabama Location within the United States
- Coordinates: 33°18′08″N 87°01′10″W
- Country: United States
- State: Alabama
- County: Jefferson, Tuscaloosa

Area
  - Total: 34.21 sq mi (88.60 km^{2})
  - Land: 33.77 sq mi (87.47 km^{2})
  - Water: 0.44 sq mi (1.14 km^{2})
- Elevation: 551 ft (168 m)

Population (2020)
  - Total: 12,965
  - Density: 383.9/sq mi (148.23/km^{2})
- Time zone: UTC-6 (Central (CST))
  - Summer (DST): UTC-5 (CDT)
- ZIP Code: 35111
- Area codes: 205, 659
- GNIS feature ID: 2805892

McCalla is a census-designated place in Jefferson and Tuscaloosa counties, Alabama, United States, southwest of Bessemer and the geographic terminus of the Appalachian Mountains. As of the 2020 census, McCalla had a population of 12,965.

The community is named for Richard Calvin McCalla, a well known civil engineer, who served as chief engineer of several railroads throughout the South, including the Alabama and Chattanooga, the Tuscaloosa and Northern and the Knoxville and Ohio. He also served as surveyor of many of the rivers throughout the South.

== Demographics ==
McCalla first appeared as a CDP in the 2020 census.

Historical population
Census	Pop.	Note	%±
2020	12,965		—
U.S. Decennial Census

=== 2020 census ===
As of the 2020 census, McCalla had a population of 12,965. The median age was 42.1 years. 21.1% of residents were under the age of 18 and 18.8% were 65 years of age or older. For every 100 females, there were 89.6 males; for every 100 females age 18 and over, there were 85.6 males age 18 and over.

McCalla CDP, Alabama – Racial and ethnic composition Note: the US Census treats Hispanic/Latino as an ethnic category. This table excludes Latinos from the racial categories and assigns them to a separate category. Hispanics/Latinos may be of any race.
Race / Ethnicity (NH = Non-Hispanic)	Pop 2020	2020
White alone (NH)	7,322	56.48%
Black or African American alone (NH)	4,596	35.45%
Native American or Alaska Native alone (NH)	23	0.18%
Asian alone (NH)	120	0.93%
Native Hawaiian or Pacific Islander alone (NH)	1	0.01%
Other race alone (NH)	63	0.49%
Mixed race or Multiracial (NH)	390	3.01%
Hispanic or Latino (any race)	450	3.47%
Total	12,965	100.00%

41.7% of residents lived in urban areas, while 58.3% lived in rural areas.

There were 5,068 households in McCalla, of which 29.9% had children under the age of 18 living in them. Of all households, 54.5% were married-couple households, 14.0% were households with a male householder and no spouse or partner present, and 27.9% were households with a female householder and no spouse or partner present. About 25.1% of all households were made up of individuals, and 10.5% had someone living alone who was 65 years of age or older.

There were 5,373 housing units, of which 5.7% were vacant. The homeowner vacancy rate was 2.3%, and the rental vacancy rate was 9.1%.

== Recreation ==
Tannehill State Park features a 19th-century blast furnace, the Iron and Steel Museum of Alabama, various historical buildings, rustic cabins, and a campground. The park also has a slave cemetery. The park is home to several festivals throughout the year, including the Southern Appalachian Dulcimer Festival, the Down Home Psaltery Festival, archery tournaments, a civil war reenactment, and other events.

Tannehill Ironworks, McCalla, Alabama

Covered bridge in McCalla

== Schools ==
The McCalla area is served by McAdory Elementary, McCalla Elementary, McAdory Middle, and McAdory High School.

== Notable people ==
- Morris Higginbotham, head football coach for several high schools in the Birmingham area.
- Bo Jackson former professional baseball and football player
- Sherri Martel, known as Sensational Sherri, was a professional wrestling valet
- Chad Smith Major League pitcher for the Colorado Rockies
