= Alabama Wildlife Management Areas =

Tracts of land for conservation

Alabama Wildlife Management Areas (WMAs) are tracts of land which have been established for the conservation and management of natural resources such as wildlife and aquatic life within the State of Alabama. The Division of Wildlife and Freshwater Fisheries of the Alabama Department of Conservation and Natural Resources is responsible for the management of these lands and their associated uses. The land is not typically state-owned, but is private land which is leased for public use. The landholders are typically large timber, oil and gas, coal, or infrastructure (railroads, utilities, etc.) companies. Public uses of the WMAs vary from area to area, but typically includes hunting, fishing, trapping, hiking, and camping. As of the 2007–2008 season over 768,000 acres (3,110 km^{2}) of land was under management as part of Alabama WMAs from the north Alabama mountains down to Mobile Bay and the Gulf of Mexico coast.

== List of national forests in Alabama ==
National forests in Alabama include:

- William B. Bankhead National Forest: The 181,230 acres (73,340 ha) of national forest includes the 91,263 acres (36,933 ha) Black Warrior Wildlife Management Area.
- Conecuh National Forest 83,000 acres (34,000 ha)
- Talladega National Forest 392,567 acres (158,866 ha)
- Tuskegee National Forest 11,000 acres (4,500 ha). The smallest in the US and one of six that is contained entirely in one county. Includes Bartram's Trail, traveled by American naturalist William Bartram.

Alabama is known as the "land of a thousand waterfalls". Sipsey Fork is the only National Wild and Scenic River in the state. There are around 140 waterfalls in Alabama.

== List of Alabama Wildlife Management Areas ==
There is over 750,000 acres (300,000 ha) of protected land in Alabama. 366,670 acres (148,390 ha) are owned by the Alabama Department of Conservation and Natural Resources, Wildlife and Freshwater Fisheries Division and State Lands Division, 345,323 acres are Federally owned acreage managed through cooperative agreements with the United States Forestry Service (USFS), United States Fish and Wildlife Service (USFWS), Tennessee Valley Authority (TVA) and United States Army Corps of Engineers (COE), and 38,000 acres (15,000 ha) privately owned and managed through "In-Kind" leases.

- Barbour Wildlife Management Area: 7,218 acres (2,921 ha).
- Black Warrior Wildlife Management Area: 91,263 acres (36,933 ha).
- Blue Spring Wildlife Management Area: 24,783 acres (10,029 ha).
- Boggy Hollow Wildlife Management Area: 7,000 acres (2,800 ha) within the 83,000 acres (34,000 ha) Conecuh National Forest Also; Talladega National Forest, Tuskegee National Forest, William B. Bankhead National Forest.
- Charles D. Kelley Autuaga County Wildlife Management Area: 8,127 acres (3,289 ha).
- Choccolocco Wildlife Management Area: The 4,406 acres (1,783 ha) is a part of the Choccolocco State Forest. It includes the 2 acres (0.81 ha) Frog Pond Wildlife Preserve and Observation Area, managed by the Jacksonville State Environmental Policy and Information Center.
- Coosa Wildlife Management Area: 32,624 acres (13,202 ha) total. Cahaba and Columbiana Tracts consist of 9,746 acres (3,944 ha).
- Crow Creek WMA: 2,069 acres (837 ha)
- Crow Creek Refuge: 3,346 acres (1,354 ha)
- David K. Nelson Wildlife Management Area: 8,308 acres (3,362 ha).
- Freedom Hills Wildlife Management Area: 33,539 acres (13,573 ha).
- Geneva State Forest Wildlife Management Area: 16,093 acres (6,513 ha)
- Grand Bay Savanna Wildlife Management Area: 5,151 acres (2,085 ha)
- Hollins Wildlife Management Area: 28,802 acres (11,656 ha)
- Jackson County Waterfowl Management Areas and Refuges: 2,069 acres (837 ha)
- James D. Martin-Skyline Wildlife Management Area: 60,732 acres (24,577 ha)
- Lauderdale Wildlife Management Area: 20,344 acres (8,233 ha)
- Little River Wildlife Management Area: 13,100 acres (5,300 ha)
- Lowndes Wildlife Management Area: 15,920 acres (6,440 ha)
- Mallard-Fox Creek Wildlife Management Area: 1,742 acres (705 ha)
- Martin Community Hunting Area (CHA): 400 acres (160 ha)
- Mobile-Tensaw Delta & W.L. Holland WMA 51,040 acres (20,660 ha)
- Mud Creek WMA: 8,003 acres (3,239 ha)
- Mulberry Fork Wildlife Management Area: 35,260 acres (14,270 ha)
- North Sauty Refuge: 5,009 acres (2,027 ha)
- Oak Mountain State Park: 9,940 acres (4,020 ha). Managed by the Alabama Department of Conservation and Natural Resources.
- Oakmulgee Wildlife Management Area: 44,500 acres (18,000 ha)
- Perdido River Wildlife Management Area: 17,337 acres (7,016 ha)
- Raccoon Creek WMA: 8,507 acres (3,443 ha)
- Red Hills Wildlife Management Area: 13,930 acres (5,640 ha)
- Riverton Community Hunting Area: 5,285 acres (2,139 ha)
- Sam R. Murphy Wildlife Management Area: 16,372 acres (6,626 ha)
- Seven-Mile Island Wildlife Management Area: 4,685 acres (1,896 ha)
- Swan Creek Wildlife Management Area: 8,870 acres (3,590 ha)
- Upper Delta Wildlife Management Area: 42,451 acres (17,179 ha)
- William R. Ireland Sr. - Cahaba River Wildlife Management Area: 35,559 acres (14,390 ha)
- Yates Lake Wildlife Management Area: 5,616 acres (2,273 ha)
