= Geneva State Forest =

Forest in Alabama, United States

Genenva State Forest
- Location within Alabama Location within the United States
- Location: Geneva County, Alabama, United States
- Coordinates: 31°08′55″N 86°10′30″W
- Area: 7,120 acres (28.8 km^{2})
- Elevation: 210 ft (64 m)
- Established: 1930s
- Named for: Geneva County
- Governing body: Alabama Forestry Commission
- Website: Official website

Geneva State Forest is an Alabama state forest in Geneva County, Alabama in the United States. The forest is 7,120 acres (2,880 ha) and sits at an elevation of 210 feet (64 m). It is Alabama's largest state forest. According to the Alabama Forestry Commission the primary objective of the state forest is to provide timber for the lumber industry and the secondary objectives are to provide habitats for wildlife and recreational opportunities for people. The forest is open for year-round recreation including hunting, fishing, hiking and camping.

== History ==
Geneva State Forest was part of the timber lands owned by the Jackson Lumber Company. The lumber company, as was a common practice of the time, clear cut the land. They were left with land that was of little use. Jackson Lumber Company tried to sell the land for as little as 50 cents an acre. When a sale never developed the company donated the land to the State of Alabama rather than continue paying property taxes that generated no income.

The land transfer took place during the Great Depression. The Civilian Conservation Corps (CCC) was a work relief program for young men from unemployed families, established in 1933. As part of President Franklin D. Roosevelt's New Deal legislation, it was designed to combat unemployment during the 1930s. The CCC operated in every U.S. state. The CCC had several camps in Alabama including one at Geneva State Forest. The young men of the CCC worked to revitalize the forests of Geneva County and southern Alabama. They did this by clearing brush, building access roads and hand planting thousands of tree seedlings.

== Timber ==
Geneva State Forest is a managed forest. Trees are harvested on a regular basis for multiple uses. The forest largely comprises longleaf pine. The longleaf pine is the official state tree of Alabama. Large forests of the pine once were present along the southeastern Atlantic coast and Gulf Coast of North America, as part of the eastern savannas. These forests were the source of naval stores - resin, turpentine, and timber.

The longleaf pine at Geneva State Forest is managed in three stages. The Alabama Forest Commission uses the natural regeneration method in their forest management. The three stages are preparatory cutting, establishment cutting and removal cutting. All three sections undergo an annual controlled burn in which ⅓ of the unit is set ablaze by foresters. The controlled fires encourage regrowth and provide forage for wildlife. Following removal cutting the forests are allowed to regenerate naturally. It takes 75 years for the forests to regrow.

== Recreation ==
Geneva State Forest is open to hunting. Common game species include white-tailed deer, wild turkeys, and eastern gray squirrels. Other animals hunted and living in the forest include bobcats, foxes, quail and rabbits. Geneva State Forest Lake is a 100 acres (40 ha) lake this is open for fishing. There is a hiking trail around the lake. Primitive camping is permitted in the state forest.
