= Lake Lurleen State Park =

State park in Tuscaloosa County, Alabama, United States

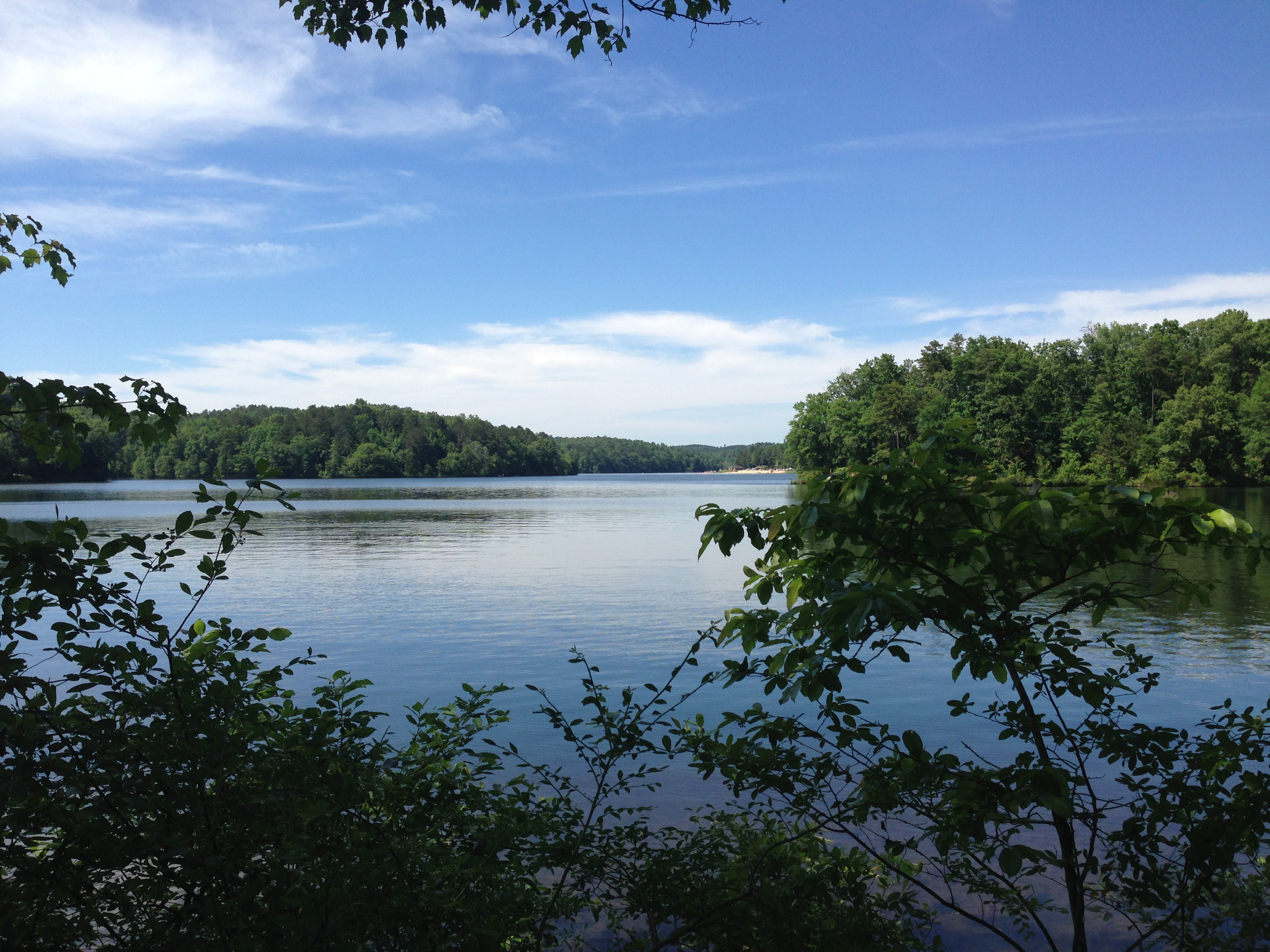

- Location within Alabama
- Location: Tuscaloosa County, Alabama, United States
- Coordinates: 33°17′29″N 87°40′52″W
- Area: 1,625 acres (658 ha)
- Elevation: 223 ft (68 m)
- Established: 1952
- Administrator: Alabama Department of Conservation and Natural Resources
- Website: Official website

Lake Lurleen State Park is a publicly owned recreation area located on U.S. Highway 82 approximately 9 miles (14 km) northwest of Northport in Tuscaloosa County, Alabama. The state park's 1,625 acres (658 ha) include 250-acre (100 ha) Lake Lurleen and a 23-mile (37 km) trail system. It is operated by the Alabama Department of Conservation and Natural Resources.

== History ==
After purchasing the site of the park in 1952, the state began construction of a dam on a tributary of Big Creek to create a 250-acre (100 ha) lake. Various concessionaires operated the park under the name Tuscaloosa County Public Lake from 1956 until 1970, when the state took control and added new facilities. In 1972, the park was renamed after Lurleen Wallace, a native of Tuscaloosa County and Alabama's first female governor, who had died in office four years earlier.

== Activities and amenities ==
Lake Lurleen is used for swimming, boating and fishing, and is stocked with largemouth bass, bream, catfish and crappie. The state park offers 91 campsites and a 23-mile (37 km) system of trails for hiking and mountain biking that encircles the lake. The trail system was designated as a National Recreation Trail in 2011.
