= Lake Lurleen =

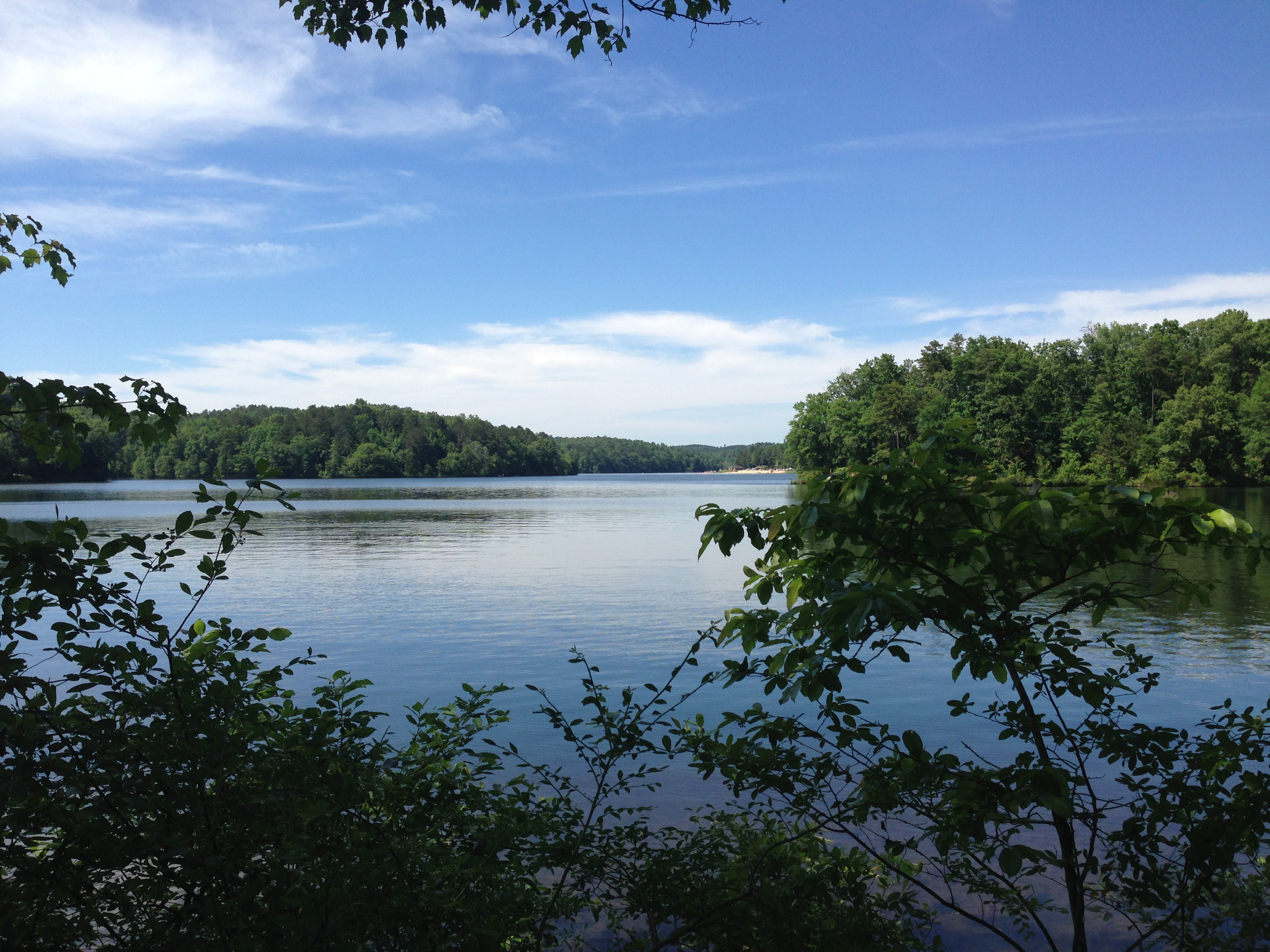
- Lake Lurleen as seen from a lakeside trail

- Location within Alabama Location within the United States
- Location: Tuscaloosa County, Alabama
- Coordinates: 33°17′43.37″N 87°40′43.66″W
- Lake type: reservoir
- Basin countries: United States
- Max. length: c. 1.5 miles (2.4 km)
- Max. width: 0.5 miles (0.80 km)
- Surface area: 250 acres (100 ha)
- Average depth: 48 feet (15 m)
- Surface elevation: 68 m (223 ft)

Lake Lurleen is a public reservoir located in Tuscaloosa County, in west-central Alabama. It is named after Lurleen Wallace, the first woman elected Governor of Alabama. It is within Lake Lurleen State Park. The lake covers 250 acres (100 ha), is about 1.5 miles (2.4 km) long and 0.5 miles (0.80 km) wide, and has a maximum depth of 48 feet (15 m). Largemouth bass, bream, catfish, and crappie reside in its waters for fishers.
