= Florala City Park =

Park in Alabama, United States

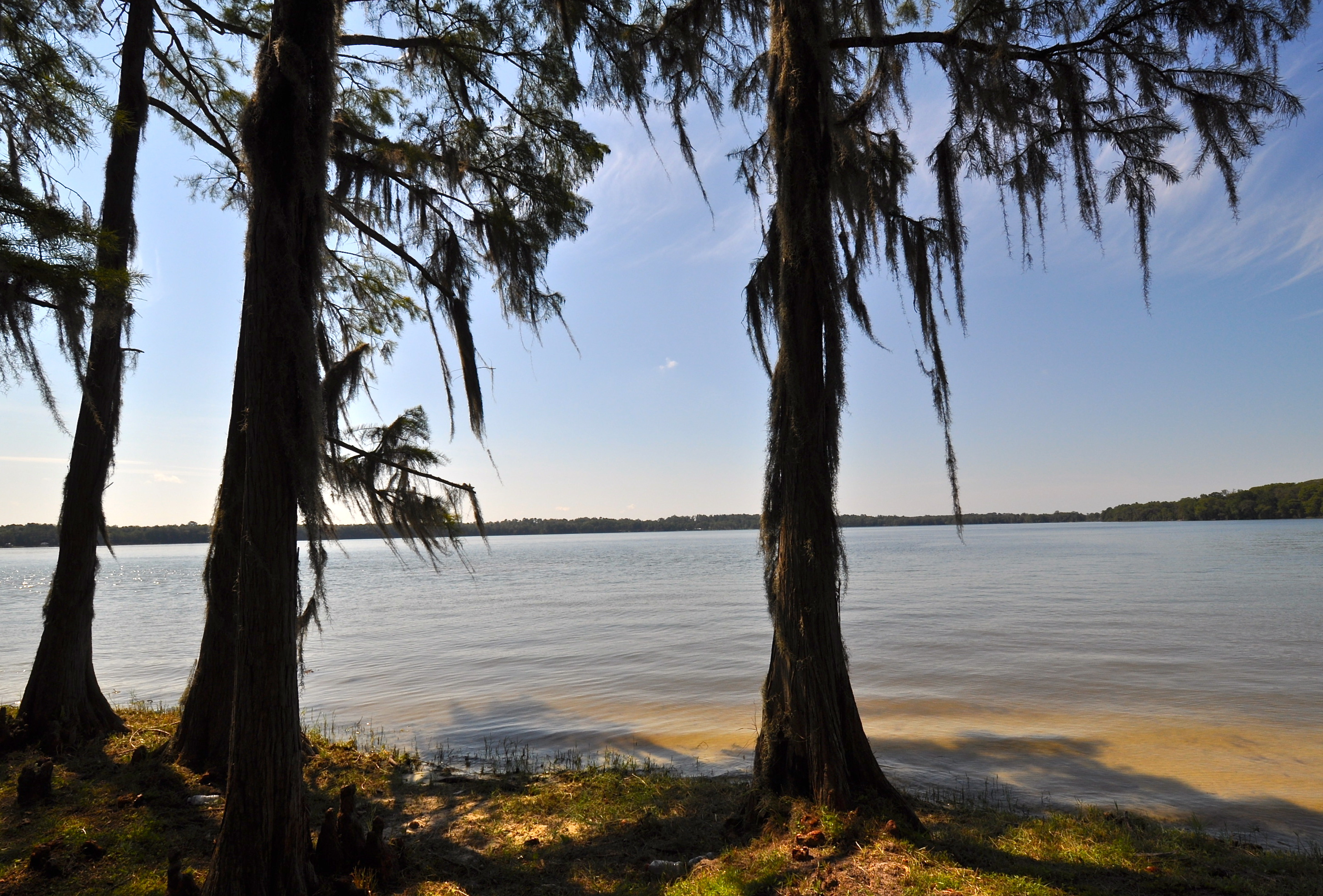
- Lake Jackson viewed from Florala City Park

- Location within Alabama Location within the United States
- Location: Florala, Covington, Alabama, United States
- Coordinates: 30°59′51″N 86°19′04″W
- Area: 40 acres (16 ha)
- Elevation: 256 ft (78 m)
- Established: 1909
- Governing body: City of Florala
- Website: Florala City Park

Florala City Park, formerly Florala State Park, is a 40-acre (16 ha) public recreation area in Florala, Alabama. The park wraps around the Alabama side of Lake Jackson, a 500-acre (200 ha) lake that straddles the Alabama-Florida state line.

== History ==
The park was established in the early 1900s and was a city-run facility in 1909. Management was turned over to the state in 1971. The park reverted to local ownership in 2015 after the state closed five of its 22 state parks in response to funding issues.

== Activities and amenities ==
The park offers boating, fishing, swimming, picnicking, and camping. Facilities include a 200-foot pier, picnic pavilions, a walking trail to Florala City Wetlands Park, and the 10,000-square-foot (930 m^{2}) Rodney J. Evans Conference Center and Amphitheater.
