= Bladon Springs, Alabama =

Unincorporated community in Alabama, United States

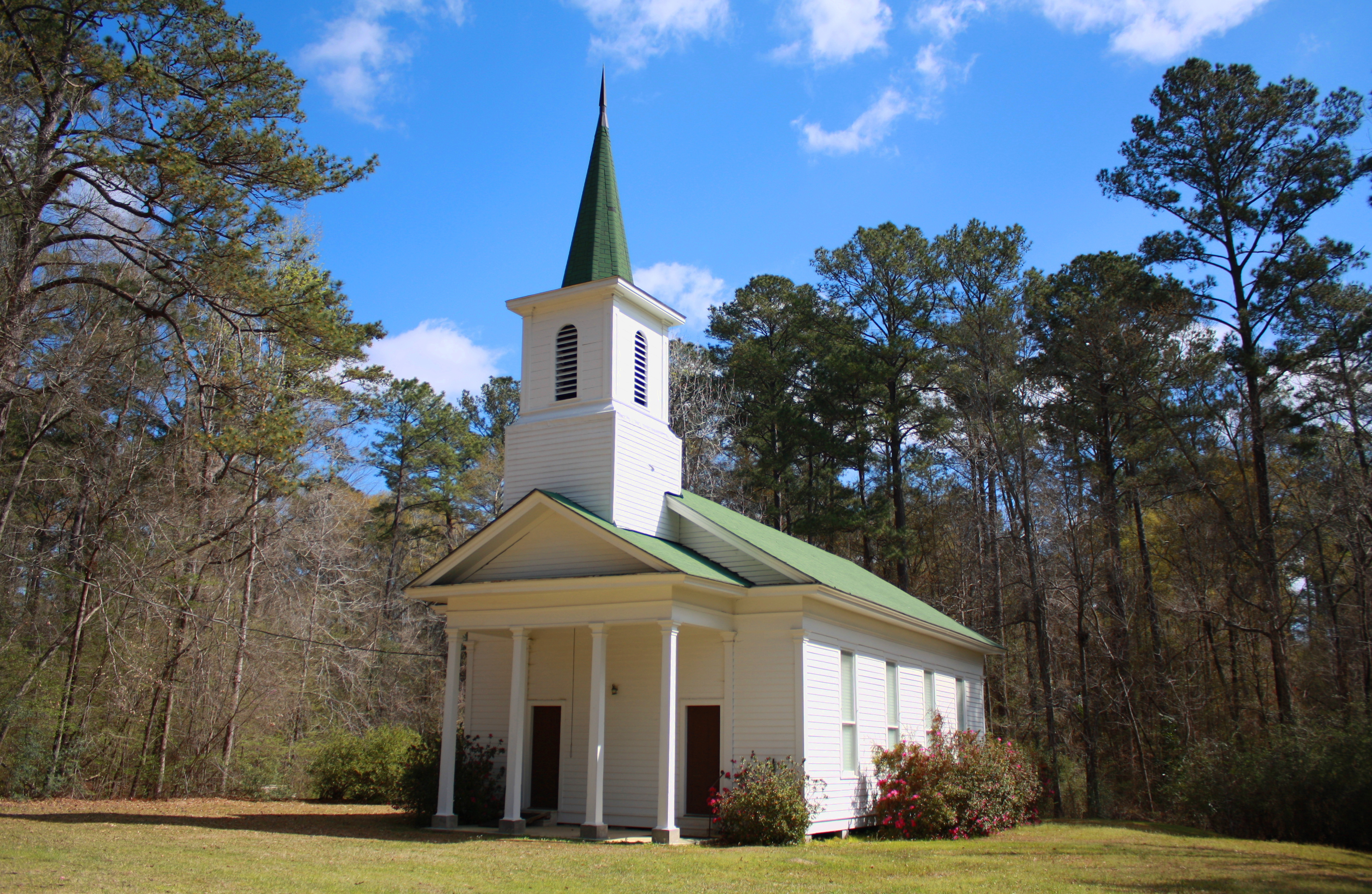
- Bladon Springs Methodist Church, built circa 1847.

- Location within the state of Alabama Bladon Springs, Alabama (the United States)
- Coordinates: 31°43′50″N 88°11′51″W
- Country: United States
- State: Alabama
- County: Choctaw
- Elevation: 95 ft (29 m)
- Time zone: UTC-6 (Central (CST))
  - Summer (DST): UTC-5 (CDT)
- Area code: 251

Bladon Springs is an unincorporated community in Choctaw County, Alabama, United States. The community grew up around and gained its name from the mineral springs that once were operated as a renowned hotel and spa, now within the modern Bladon Springs State Park. The community itself featured many ornate homes and cottages built as summer residences by people from other parts of the state and elsewhere. Much of the community is part of the Bladon Springs Historic District, listed on the Alabama Register of Landmarks and Heritage on April 1, 1976.

In 1880 and 1890, Bladon Springs was listed on the U.S. Census as having 573 and 440 persons, making it the then-most populous community in Choctaw County.

== Geography ==
Bladon Springs is located at 31.73071°N 88.19751°W and has an elevation of 95 feet (29 m).

Historical population
Census	Pop.	Note	%±
1880	573		—
1890	440		−23.2%
U.S. Decennial Census

== Notable person ==
- Frank W. Boykin, U.S. Congressman for Alabama's 1st congressional district from 1935 to 1963

== Gallery ==
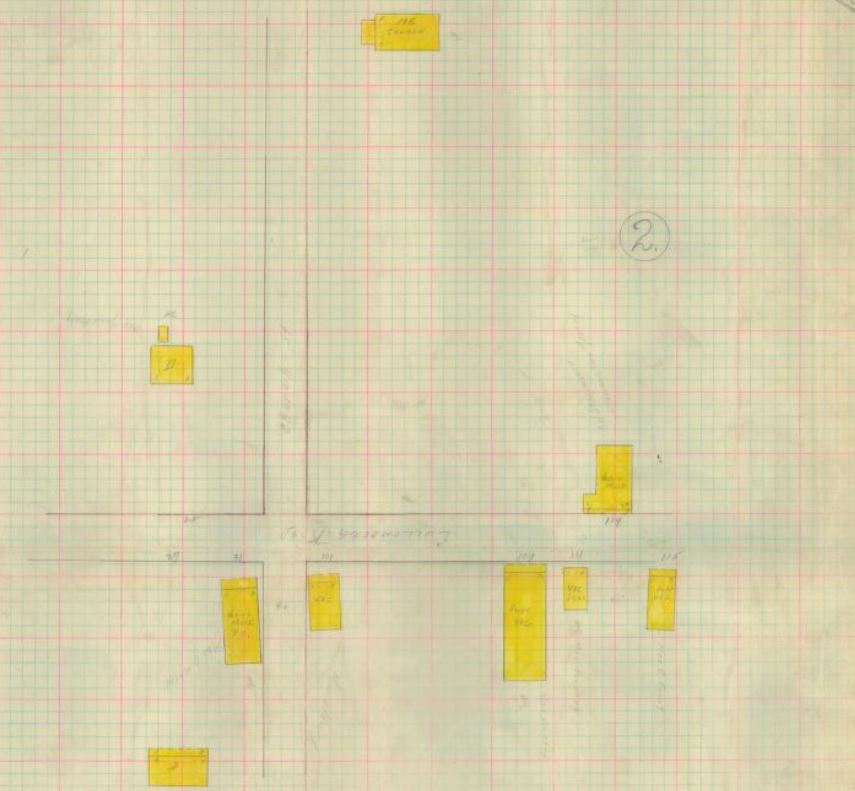
1922 fire insurance map of Bladon Springs
