= Frank Jackson State Park =

State park in Covington County, Alabama, United States

- Location within Alabama
- Location: Opp, Alabama, United States
- Coordinates: 31°19′07″N 86°16′10″W
- Area: 2,050 acres (830 ha)
- Elevation: 226 ft (69 m)
- Established: 1970
- Administrator: Alabama Department of Conservation and Natural Resources
- Website: Official website

Frank Jackson State Park is a public recreation area that wraps around Lake Frank Jackson and forms the northwesternmost portion of the city of Opp, Alabama. The 2,050-acre (830 ha) state park offers facilities for fishing, boating, hiking, and camping.

== History ==
The park opened as Lightwood Knot Creek State Park in 1970. It has borne the name of longtime Covington County legislator Frank Jackson since the 1980s.

== Activities and amenities ==
Fishing tournaments are regularly held on Lake Frank Jackson, a 1,037-acre (420 ha) impoundment of Lightwood Knot Creek. Bass, bream and crappie are abundant. The park has 3 miles (4.8 km) of easy walking trails that include a loop trail around an island in the lake that is accessed from a boardwalk/bridge.
