= Tannehill Ironworks =

United States state park and historic place

Tannehill Ironworks Historical State Park
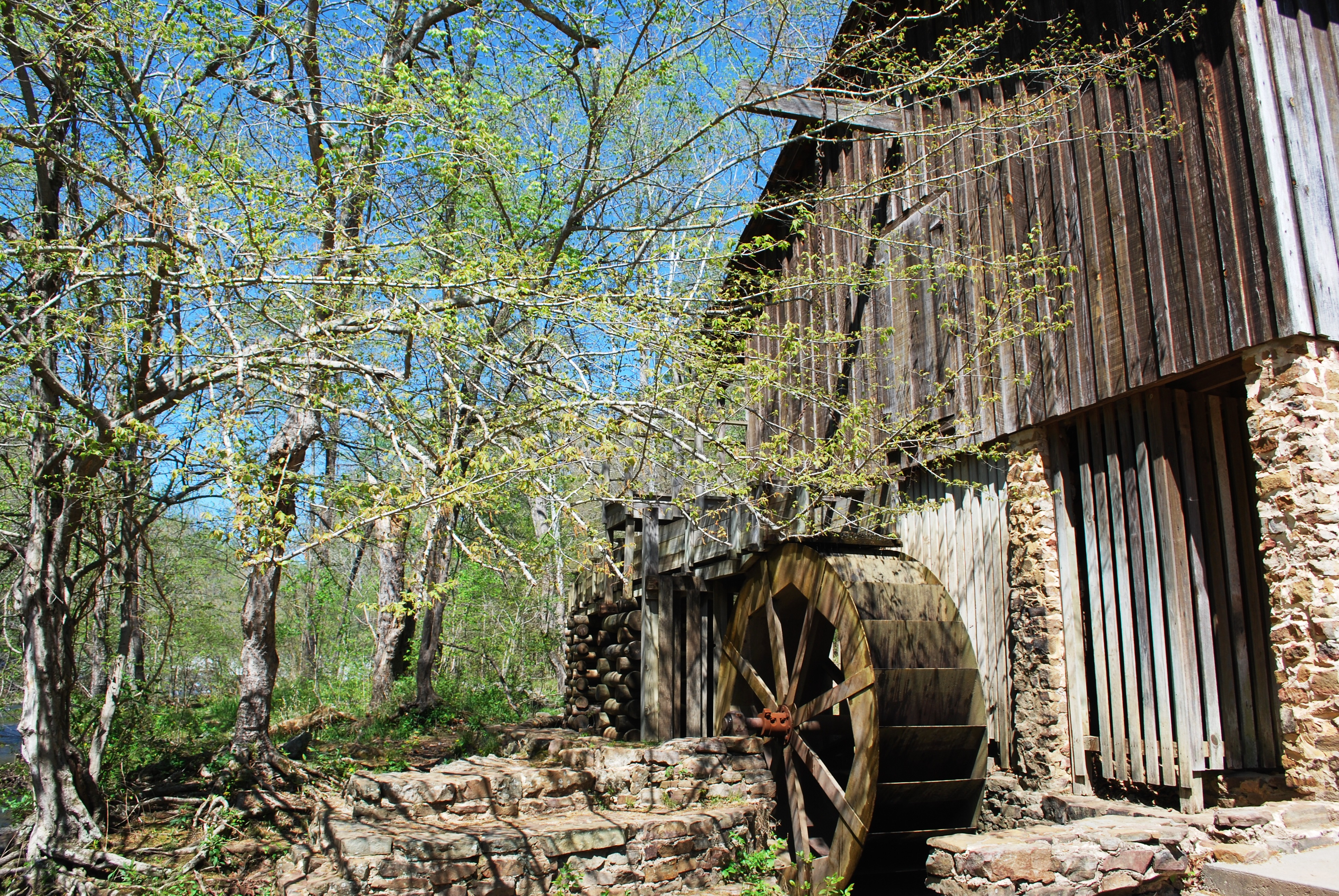
- John Wesley Hall Grist Mill

- Location within Alabama
- Location: Tuscaloosa County, Alabama, United States
- Coordinates: 33°15′00″N 87°04′04″W
- Area: 1,500 acres (610 ha)
- Elevation: 427 ft (130 m)
- Established: 1969 (opened 1971)
- Administrator: Alabama Historic Ironworks Commission
- Designation: Alabama state park
- Website: Official website
- Tannehill Furnace
- U.S. National Register of Historic Places
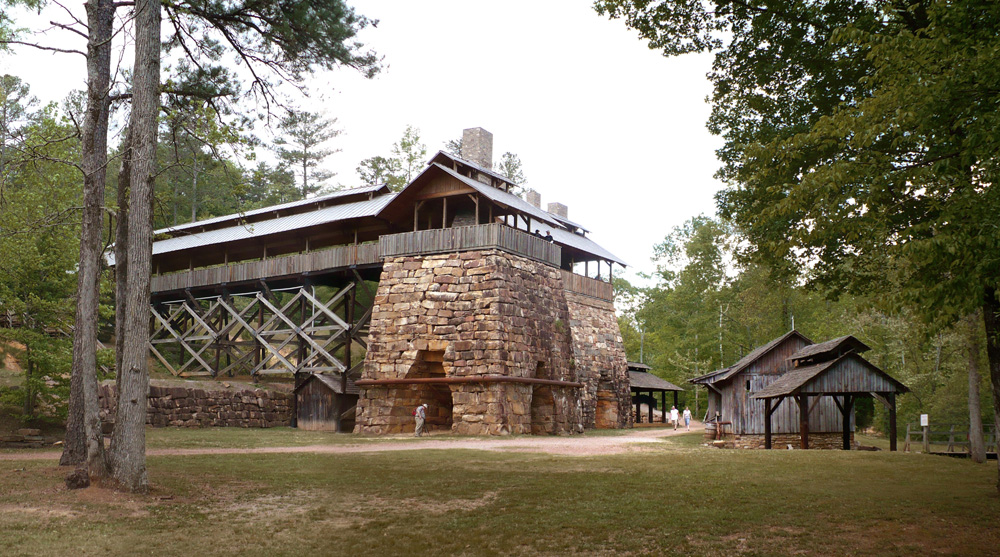
- Location: Tuscaloosa County, Alabama, United States
- Area: 66 acres (27 ha)
- Built: 1859-62
- Built by: Hillman, Daniel
- NRHP reference No.: 72000182
- Added to NRHP: July 24, 1972

The Tannehill Ironworks is the central feature of Tannehill Ironworks Historical State Park near the unincorporated town of McCalla in Tuscaloosa County, Alabama. Listed on the National Register of Historic Places as Tannehill Furnace, it was a major supplier of iron for Confederate ordnance. Remains of the old furnaces are located 12 miles (19 km) south of Bessemer off Interstate 59/Interstate 20 near the southern end of the Appalachian Mountains. The 1,500-acre (610 ha) park includes: the John Wesley Hall Grist Mill; the May Plantation Cotton Gin House; and the Iron & Steel Museum of Alabama.

== History ==
Ironmaking at the site began with construction of a bloomery forge by Daniel Hillman Sr. in 1830. Built by noted southern ironmaster Moses Stroup from 1859 to 1862, the three charcoal blast furnaces at Tannehill could produce 22 tons of pig iron a day, most of which was shipped to the Naval Gun Works and Arsenal at Selma. Furnaces Nos. 2 and 3 were equipped with hot blast stoves and a steam engine. Brown iron ore mines were present two miles (3 km) distant.

The Tannehill furnaces and its adjacent foundry, where kettles and hollow-ware were cast for southern troops, were attacked and burnt by three companies of the U.S. 8th Iowa Cavalry on March 31, 1865 during Wilson's Raid. The ruins remain today as one of the best preserved 19th-century iron furnace sites in the South.

Also known as the Roupes Valley Iron Company, these works had significant influence on the later development of the Birmingham iron and steel industry. An experiment conducted at Tannehill in 1862 proved red iron ore could successfully be used in Alabama blast furnaces. The test, promoted by South & North Railroad developers, led to the location of government-financed ironworks in the immediate Birmingham area (Jefferson County).

Listings

The furnace remains and its reconstructed portions were named an American Society for Metals historical landmark in 1994. The park is an American Battlefield Trust Heritage Site, a stop on the Alabama Appalachian Highlands Birding Trail, and was listed among the top 10 Alabama parks and nature areas visited in 2016.

== See also ==
- Birmingham District
- Brierfield Furnace
- Shelby Ironworks
