= Florala Municipal Airport =

Airport in Alabama, United States

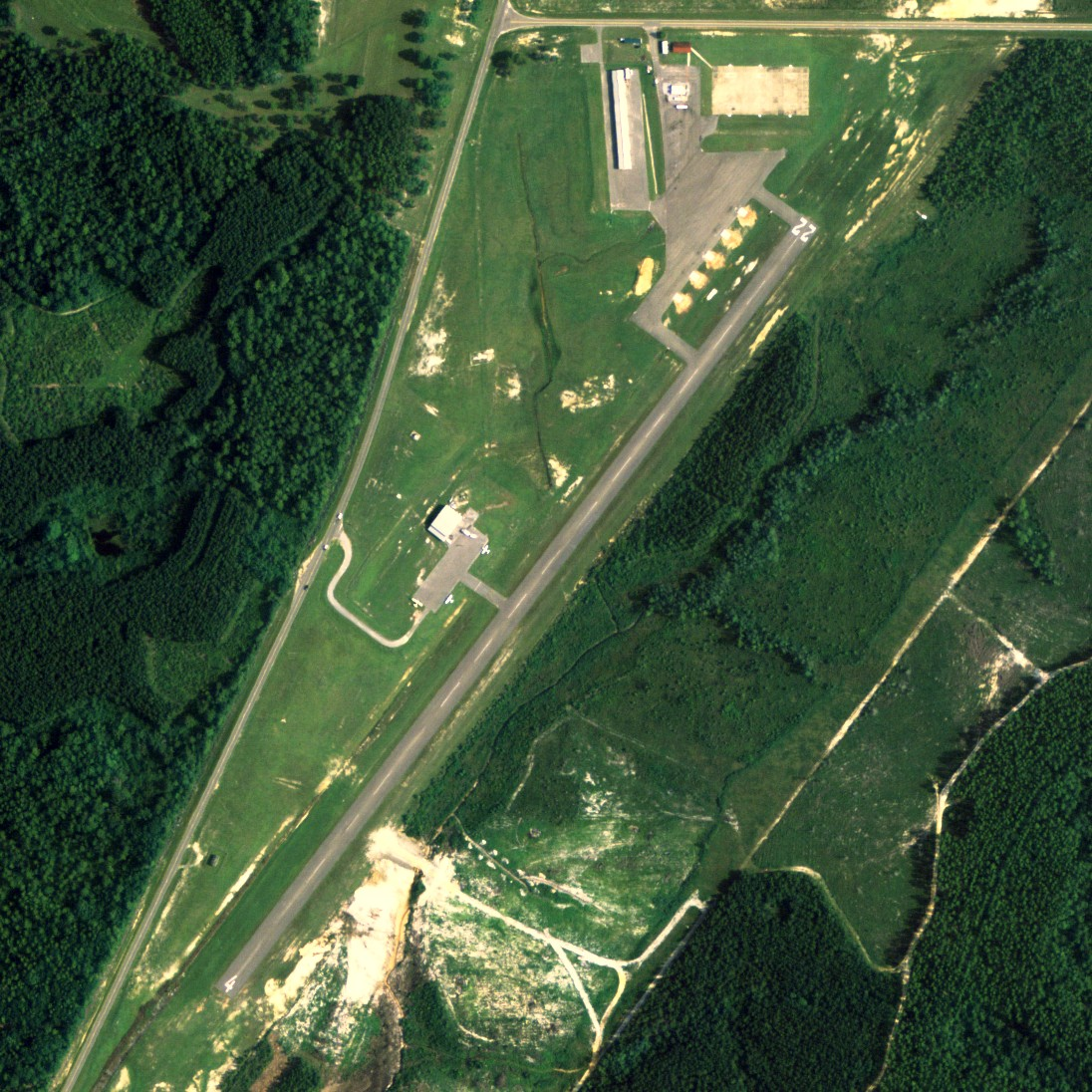
- NAIP aerial image, 20 August 2006
- IATA: none; ICAO: none; FAA LID: 0J4

Summary
- Airport type: Public
- Owner: City of Florala
- Serves: Florala, Alabama
- Elevation AMSL: 314 ft (96 m)
- Coordinates: 31°02′33″N 086°18′42″W

Map
- Location of airport in Alabama 0J4 (the United States)

Runways
Direction	Length		Surface
Direction	ft	m	Surface
4/22	3,197	974	Asphalt

Statistics (2010)
- Aircraft operations: 21,940
- Based aircraft: 9
- Source: Federal Aviation Administration

Florala Municipal Airport (FAA LID: 0J4) is a city-owned public-use airport located three nautical miles (4 mi, 6 km) northeast of the central business district of Florala, a city in Covington County, Alabama, United States.

This airport is included in the FAA's National Plan of Integrated Airport Systems for 2011–2015 and 2009–2013, both of which categorized it as a general aviation facility.

== Facilities and aircraft ==
Florala Municipal Airport covers an area of 88 acres (36 ha) at an elevation of 314 feet (96 m) above mean sea level. It has one runway designated 4/22 with an asphalt surface measuring 3,197 by 75 feet (974 x 23 m).

For the 12-month period ending July 20, 2010, the airport had 21,940 aircraft operations, an average of 60 per day: 91% military and 9% general aviation. At that time there were 9 aircraft based at this airport: 100% single-engine.

== See also ==
- List of airports in Alabama
