= R. Barbara Gitenstein =

President of The College of New Jersey

R. Barbara Gitenstein was the president of The College of New Jersey. She holds a bachelor's degree in English from Duke University ('70) and a Ph.D. in English and American literature from UNC in 1975. Gitenstein was born in Florala, Alabama, a town of 2,000 where hers was one of the few Jewish families. She attended Holton-Arms School, an all-woman's high school. On July 11, 2017, Gitenstein announced she would retire at the end of the 2017-2018 academic year.

She started her career in education at the University of Central Missouri where she served as an assistant professor in the English department. Gitenstein then moved to SUNY Oswego where she was subsequently named chair of the English department, and later appointed assistant provost. In 1992, Gitenstein moved to Drake University in Des Moines, Iowa, where she served as executive vice president and then provost. She then moved to TCNJ in 1999 as the first woman president. Gitenstein announced on January 1, 2018, that she would retire from The College of New Jersey effective June 30, 2018. She was replaced by Kathryn Foster of the University of Maine-Farmington.

Gitenstein has served on several corporate boards and committees, including the New Jersey Resources Corporation, the Mercer County Holocaust Advisory Committee, the Greater Mercer County and the New Jersey Chambers of Commerce, and co-chairman for the Guardian Angels dinner-dance hosted by Catholic Charities, board member of The Robert Wood Johnson University Hospital at Hamilton.

Gitenstein has published several articles on Jewish and American literature, authored the book "Apocalyptic Messianism and Contemporary Jewish-American Poetry."
