= Bladon Springs State Park =

State historic park in Alabama, United States

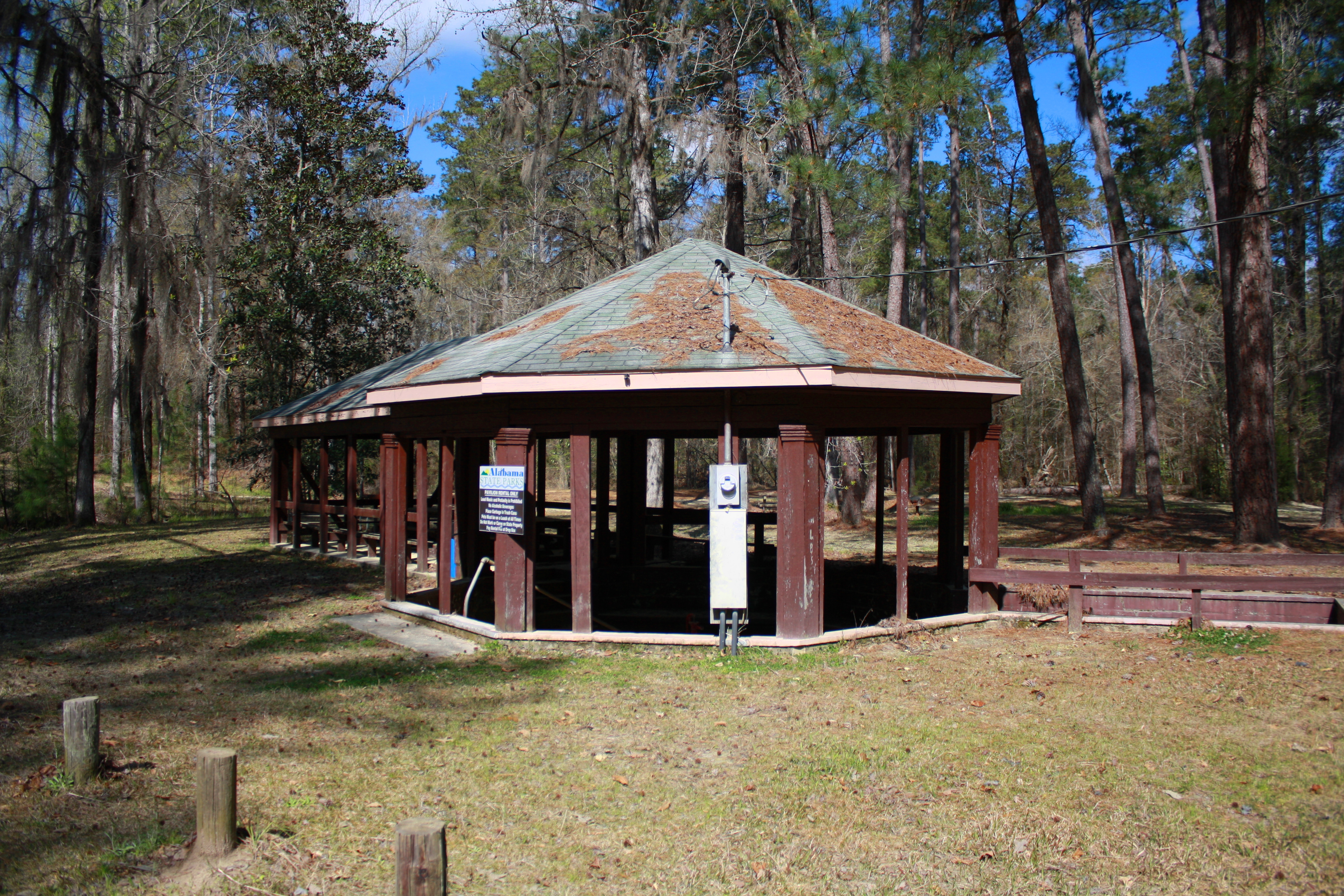
- Octagonal spring pavilion, the site's last remaining antebellum-era structure

- Location within Alabama
- Interactive map of Bladon Springs State Park
- Location: Choctaw County, Alabama, United States
- Coordinates: 31°44′04″N 88°11′42″W
- Area: 357 acres (144 ha)
- Elevation: 92 ft (28 m)
- Established: 1939
- Administrator: Choctaw County and Alabama Department of Conservation and Natural Resources
- Visitors: 1400 (in 2009)
- Website: Official website

Bladon Springs State Park is a public recreation area located on the site of four mineral springs that were once part of the historic spa at Bladon Springs, Choctaw County, Alabama. The park is operated in a partnership between Alabama State Parks and Choctaw County.

== History ==
The springs bearing the name of the property's first owner, John Bladon, were opened as a spa by James Conner in 1838. Travelers from near and far were drawn by the mineral content of the spring water, which was thought to possess healing qualities. After building cottages that could accommodate one hundred guests, Conner improved his spa in 1846 with a grand Greek Revival–style hotel that could house 200 more people. The structure featured a full-length, two-story veranda across its front, ballroom, bowling alley, billiard room, hotel bar, and skating rink. A latticed pavilion over the principal spring, bath houses, latticed pergola, and croquet court were part of the grounds. The hotel was one of the largest wooden hotels ever built in Alabama and together with the grounds earned for the springs the nickname the "Saratoga of the South."

The hotel operated through the Civil War, finding full operation again by 1870, then saw diminishing popularity in the 20th century, until it closed "sometime after 1913." Logging crews found lodging there until the hotel was purchased by the state in 1934 for state employee housing. The grounds were opened as a state park after the hotel burned down in 1938. The cottages were eventually demolished or moved, leaving the pavilion over the main spring as the only remaining original structure.

The park came under local management after being one of five Alabama state parks that were closed or saw curtailment of services in 2015 following state budget cuts and is being operated under a partnership between the Alabama State Parks and Choctaw County.

== Spring water ==
Analysis by a state geologist in 1845 found the springs to contain sulfur, iron, magnesium, and calcium.

The water from the springs is laden with sulfur-fixing bacteria and is slightly yellow-tinged. It has a faint odor of sulfur and contains small gauze-like masses of the bacteria. These bacteria are harmless to humans. Although most visitors come to bathe in the water, it is also potable, and even pleasant to drink after the solid materials have been strained out and the water chilled.

== Activities and amenities ==
The park offers camping, picnicking and playground facilities. It is a stop on the Alabama Black Belt Birding Trail.
