= Francis M. Jackson =

American personal injury attorney

- Born: 1949 (age 76–77)
- Education: Bowdoin College (BA); University of Maine (JD)
- Occupation: Lawyer
- Years active: 1977-present
- Notable work: Protect and Defend, Social Security Disability Law, A reference for New England Disability Claims

Francis M. Jackson (born 1949) is an American veterans law and personal injury attorney who is also an authority on Social Security disability. He has practiced law since 1977 and is a founding partner in the law firm of Jackson & MacNichol.

== Early life and personal life ==
Jackson lived in several states as a child, including Tennessee, Connecticut, New York and Maine. He graduated from Bowdoin College, where he was a James Bowdoin Scholar, graduating summa cum laude. He attended the University of Maine School of Law where he served on the editorial board of the law review and on the national moot court team and was on the Dean's list. He was chosen for an internship with the Mental Health Law Project sponsored by the Ford Foundation in his final semester of Law School.

He is the brother of American foreign service officer and diplomat Robert P. Jackson.

== Career ==
Jackson has twice been the recipient of the pro bono award from the Maine Volunteer Lawyers Project for providing legal services for the indigent. He was presented with the award by Maine's Chief Justice.

Jackson attended the 1993 founding meeting of the National Organization of Veterans Advocates (NOVA) of which he is a member. He is the secretary of the Maine State Bar Association Veterans Law Section. He has presented at continuing legal education programs sponsored by the bar association to teach lawyers about veterans law. He has participated in free legal clinics for veterans to review their claims and advise them of their rights regarding veterans benefits. Jackson has also presented on veterans law for Maine's libraries. He has handled hundreds of veterans cases at the Court of Appeals for Veterans Claims and the Court of Appeals for the Federal Circuit as well as representing veterans in hearings before local Veterans Administration (VA) hearing offices and before the Board of Veterans’ Appeals all across the country.

One of Jackson's most important cases was Moody v. Principi, 357 F.3d 1370 (Fed. Cir. 2004), establishing that the VA must give full consideration to claims filed by veterans not represented by an attorney. In 2018, Jackson won Cook v. Wilkie, establishing a veteran's entitlement to an opportunity for a hearing whenever the Board of Veterans' Appeals decides an appeal, including decisions on remand.

Jackson is a regular contributor on the Bert Martinez blog talk radio show, Money For Lunch, where he discusses the issues that affect veterans benefits.

Jackson is admitted to practice before the Court of Appeals for Veterans Claims, the Court of Appeals for the Federal Circuit, the Court of Appeals for the First Circuit, the Court of Appeals for the Third Circuit, the Court of Appeals for the Fourth Circuit, and the Maine Supreme Judicial Court as well as the United States District Court.

Jackson has also represented hundreds of people applying for disability benefits from the Social Security administration. He is a sustaining member of the National Organization of Social Security Representatives. He has presented hundreds of social security appeals in the federal district and circuit courts, winning numerous cases.

Jackson won an important case, Ainsworth v. SSA (2010), in the United States District court in New Hampshire, where he successfully argued against the use of telephone testimony by experts in Social Security disability cases. He recently won Jenkins v. Colvin (2015), a Maine case establishing that Social Security judges cannot ignore or overrule vocational testimony favorable to the claimant and Maniscalco v. Colvin (2016), in Massachusetts, establishing that vocational expert testimony must be based upon the actual experience of the vocational witness. Jackson is a joint presenter of annual seminars for other attorneys regarding social security matters.

Before limiting his practice to injury and disability work, Mr. Jackson won the case State v. Anaya, in which he was the first attorney in Maine ever to win a murder case based on the battered woman defense. He also won severance benefits for an entire class of employees who were terminated by Schlumberger Technologies in Bellino v. Schlumberger, 944 F.2d 26 (1st Cir. 1991).

In September 2012, Jackson was presented with a Quilly award by the National Academy of Best Selling Authors for his contribution as a joint author of the book, Protect and Defend, where he wrote about protecting and defending ones rights to disability compensation from the VA.

Jackson has been seen on ABC, NBC, CBS and Fox TV network affiliates around the country, is listed in Cambridge Who's Who and has been quoted in USA Today.

Jackson is also the author of Social Security Disability Law, A reference for New England Disability Claims, Speaker Media Press, 2013. He was writing a book on veterans compensation and pension benefits.
