= Florala, Alabama =

- Town
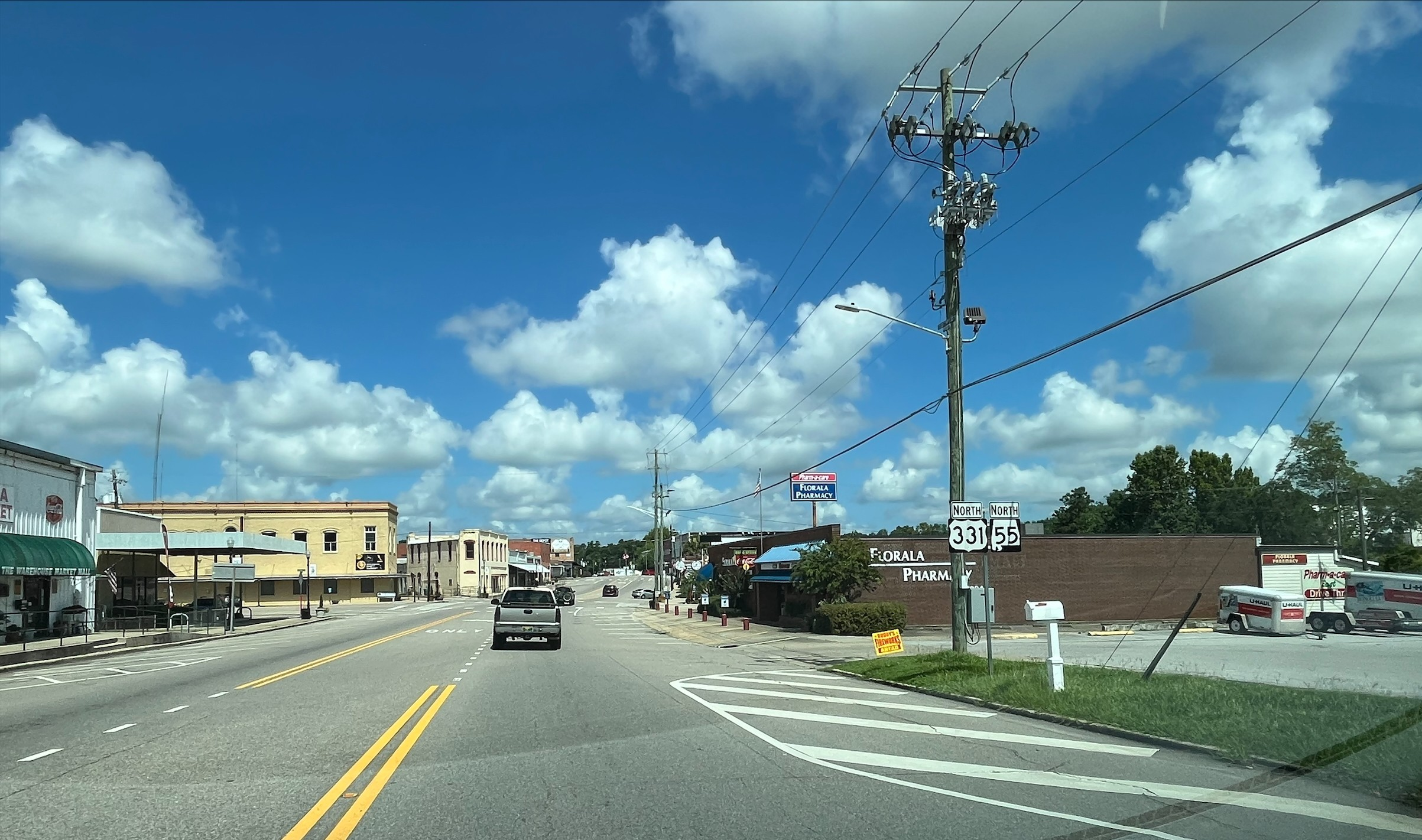
- Downtown Florala

- Location of Florala in Covington County, Alabama.
- Coordinates: 31°00′27″N 86°18′40″W
- Country: United States
- State: Alabama
- County: Covington

Area
  - Total: 10.98 sq mi (28.44 km^{2})
  - Land: 10.53 sq mi (27.28 km^{2})
  - Water: 0.45 sq mi (1.16 km^{2})
- Elevation: 246 ft (75 m)

Population (2020)
  - Total: 1,923
  - Density: 182.6/sq mi (70.49/km^{2})
- Time zone: UTC−6 (Central (CST))
  - Summer (DST): UTC−5 (CDT)
- ZIP code: 36442
- Area code: 334
- FIPS code: 01-26848
- GNIS feature ID: 2406502
- Website: www.cityofflorala.com

Florala is a town in Covington County, Alabama, United States. At the 2020 census, the population was 1,923.

== Geography ==
Florala is located along the Alabama–Florida state line. It is bordered by the town of Lockhart to the west and the town of Paxton, Florida, to the south.

According to the U.S. Census Bureau, the city has a total area of 11.0 square miles (28.4 km^{2}), of which 10.5 square miles (27.3 km^{2}) is land and 0.46 square miles (1.2 km^{2}), or 4.07%, is water. Lake Jackson lies on the state line, half in Florala. Florala City Park occupies all of the lake's shoreline in Alabama.

=== Climate ===
The climate in this area is characterized by hot, humid summers and generally mild winters. According to the Köppen climate classification, the town of Florala has a humid subtropical climate (Cfa). As of 2023, the USDA hardiness zone for Florala is Zone 9A.

Climate data for Florala, Alabama (Florala Municipal Airport), 1991–2020 normals, extremes 2006–2020
Month	Jan	Feb	Mar	Apr	May	Jun	Jul	Aug	Sep	Oct	Nov	Dec	Year
Record high °F (°C)	83 (28)	84 (29)	89 (32)	94 (34)	99 (37)	104 (40)	102 (39)	103 (39)	103 (39)	100 (38)	91 (33)	81 (27)	104 (40)
Mean daily maximum °F (°C)	62.2 (16.8)	66.2 (19.0)	73.1 (22.8)	79.4 (26.3)	86.6 (30.3)	90.3 (32.4)	91.8 (33.2)	91.7 (33.2)	88.5 (31.4)	80.0 (26.7)	71.3 (21.8)	63.6 (17.6)	78.7 (26.0)
Daily mean °F (°C)	51.3 (10.7)	54.7 (12.6)	61.0 (16.1)	67.0 (19.4)	74.7 (23.7)	80.1 (26.7)	82.1 (27.8)	82.0 (27.8)	78.4 (25.8)	68.4 (20.2)	59.1 (15.1)	52.9 (11.6)	67.6 (19.8)
Mean daily minimum °F (°C)	40.5 (4.7)	43.3 (6.3)	48.8 (9.3)	54.6 (12.6)	62.7 (17.1)	70.0 (21.1)	72.4 (22.4)	72.4 (22.4)	68.3 (20.2)	56.7 (13.7)	46.9 (8.3)	42.3 (5.7)	56.6 (13.7)
Record low °F (°C)	12 (−11)	20 (−7)	28 (−2)	35 (2)	43 (6)	58 (14)	59 (15)	62 (17)	50 (10)	34 (1)	19 (−7)	22 (−6)	12 (−11)
Average precipitation inches (mm)	5.28 (134)	5.00 (127)	5.28 (134)	5.00 (127)	3.78 (96)	6.01 (153)	6.35 (161)	5.17 (131)	5.18 (132)	3.61 (92)	4.31 (109)	4.85 (123)	59.82 (1,519)
Source 1: NOAA
Source 2: XMACIS2

== Demographics ==
Historical population
Census	Pop.	Note	%±
1910	2,439		—
1920	2,633		8.0%
1930	2,580		−2.0%
1940	2,999		16.2%
1950	2,713		−9.5%
1960	3,011		11.0%
1970	2,701		−10.3%
1980	2,165		−19.8%
1990	2,075		−4.2%
2000	1,964		−5.3%
2010	1,980		0.8%
2020	1,923		−2.9%
U.S. Decennial Census; 2013 Estimate

=== Racial and ethnic composition ===
Florala town, Alabama – Racial and ethnic composition Note: the US Census treats Hispanic/Latino as an ethnic category. This table excludes Latinos from the racial categories and assigns them to a separate category. Hispanics/Latinos may be of any race. Race and ethnicity was not surveyed for populations under 2,500 in the 1980 census and under 1,000 in 1990 census.
Race / Ethnicity (NH = Non-Hispanic)	Pop 1990	Pop 2000	Pop 2010	Pop 2020	% 1990	% 2000	% 2010	% 2020
White alone (NH)	1,604	1,561	1,555	1,481	77.30%	79.48%	78.54%	77.02%
Black or African American alone (NH)	456	302	310	296	21.98%	15.38%	15.66%	15.39%
Native American or Alaska Native alone (NH)	4	17	10	3	0.19%	0.87%	0.51%	0.16%
Asian alone (NH)	4	12	4	11	0.19%	0.61%	0.20%	0.57%
Native Hawaiian or Pacific Islander alone (NH)	x	0	0	0	x	0.00%	0.00%	0.00%
Other race alone (NH)	0	0	0	2	0.00%	0.00%	0.00%	0.10%
Mixed race or Multiracial (NH)	x	20	45	68	x	1.02%	2.27%	3.54%
Hispanic or Latino (any race)	7	52	56	62	0.34%	2.65%	2.83%	3.22%
Total	2,075	1,964	1,980	1,923	100.00%	100.00%	100.00%	100.00%

=== 2020 census ===
As of the 2020 census, Florala had a population of 1,923, and there were 352 families residing in the town. The median age was 46.1 years. 20.3% of residents were under the age of 18 and 24.4% of residents were 65 years of age or older. For every 100 females there were 86.2 males, and for every 100 females age 18 and over there were 80.1 males age 18 and over.

0.0% of residents lived in urban areas, while 100.0% lived in rural areas.

There were 810 households in Florala, of which 27.3% had children under the age of 18 living in them. Of all households, 33.2% were married-couple households, 21.2% were households with a male householder and no spouse or partner present, and 39.4% were households with a female householder and no spouse or partner present. About 36.7% of all households were made up of individuals and 17.8% had someone living alone who was 65 years of age or older.

There were 1,017 housing units, of which 20.4% were vacant. The homeowner vacancy rate was 3.2% and the rental vacancy rate was 10.1%.

=== 2010 census ===
As of the census of 2010, there were 1,980 people, 839 households, and 514 families living in the city. The population density was 180.2 inhabitants per square mile (69.6/km^{2}). There were 1,107 housing units at an average density of 105.0 per square mile (40.5/km^{2}). The racial makeup of the city was 80.1% White, 15.8% Black or African American, 0.8% Native American, 0.4% Asian, 0.7% from other races, and 2.3% from two or more races. 2.8% of the population were Hispanic or Latino of any race.

There were 839 households, out of which 23.5% had children under the age of 18 living with them, 38.1% were married couples living together, 17.6% had a female householder with no husband present, and 38.7% were non-families. 34.7% of all households were made up of individuals, and 17.8% had someone living alone who was 65 years of age or older. The average household size was 2.26 and the average family size was 2.90.

In the city, the population was 21.6% under the age of 18, 7.9% from 18 to 24, 18.9% from 25 to 44, 27.7% from 45 to 64, and 23.8% who were 65 years of age or older. The median age was 46.1 years. For every 100 females, there were 88.0 males. For every 100 females age 18 and over, there were 92.9 males.

The median income for a household in the city was $30,833, and the median income for a family was $36,435. Males had a median income of $24,000 versus $20,100 for females. The per capita income for the city was $16,344. About 15.7% of families and 20.2% of the population were below the poverty line, including 28.5% of those under age 18 and 15.4% of those age 65 or over.

=== 2000 census ===
As of the census of 2000, there were 1,964 people, 898 households, and 527 families living in the city. The population density was 187.0 inhabitants per square mile (72.2/km^{2}). There were 1,103 housing units at an average density of 105.0 per square mile (40.5/km^{2}). The racial makeup of the city was 80.75% White, 15.68% Black or African American, 0.87% Native American, 0.61% Asian, 0.66% from other races, and 1.43% from two or more races. 2.65% of the population were Hispanic or Latino of any race.

There were 898 households, out of which 23.9% had children under the age of 18 living with them, 40.5% were married couples living together, 14.3% had a female householder with no husband present, and 41.3% were non-families. 36.4% of all households were made up of individuals, and 21.6% had someone living alone who was 65 years of age or older. The average household size was 2.19 and the average family size was 2.86.

In the city, the population was 21.8% under the age of 18, 7.8% from 18 to 24, 24.6% from 25 to 44, 24.2% from 45 to 64, and 21.5% who were 65 years of age or older. The median age was 42 years. For every 100 females, there were 82.5 males. For every 100 females age 18 and over, there were 76.3 males. The median income for a household in the city was $17,377, and the median income for a family was $21,176. Males had a median income of $27,569 versus $15,625 for females. The per capita income for the city was $11,495. About 29.3% of families and 32.4% of the population were below the poverty line, including 38.8% of those under age 18 and 26.6% of those age 65 or over.

== Etymology ==
The name is a portmanteau of Florida and Alabama.

== History ==
In 1818, Andrew Jackson stopped at the lake with his soldiers, and thus Lake Jackson is named after him. Since 1870, Florala has served as the home of the world's oldest consecutive annual Masonic Day celebration, through Florala's Fidelity Masonic Lodge #685 (beginning with Chapel Hill and Lake City Lodge #377), and Chapter #441 of the Order of the Eastern Star. The celebration is in honor of St. John's Day, June 24, 1717, when the first Grand Masonic Lodge in England was established. The celebration is held each year on the Friday before June 24 and concluding on the Saturday after the 24th.

== Education ==
It is within the Covington County Board of Education school district.

Florala High School is in Florala.

There was formerly a Florala City Middle School.

== Notable people ==
- Sgt. Rodney J. Evans (1948–1969), awarded the Medal of Honor after being killed in Vietnam while exposing himself to enemy fire in order to protect his men.
- R. Barbara Gitenstein, first female and past president of The College of New Jersey; grew up in Florala.
- Mark Gitenstein, Ambassador to Romania; brother to Barbara Gitenstein.
- Ray Goolsby, former Major League Baseball player for the Washington Senators.
- Ernie Manning, former Major League Baseball pitcher, right fielder, and third baseman for the St. Louis Browns.
- Dwight Stone, who played for the NY Jets, Carolina Panthers, Pittsburgh Steelers; born in Florala on January 28, 1964.
