= Frank Jackson (Alabama politician) =

American politician

Walter Frank Jackson (March 13, 1915 – 1983), was an American politician and businessman from Opp, Alabama. A Democrat, he served for 12 years in the Alabama House of Representatives, as well as two terms on the Opp City Council from 1952 to 1960. He was a charter member of the Opp Lions Club in 1946, served as president of that organization from 1945 to 1950, and was still an active member at the time of his death. He was a member of the Opp City Board of Education from 1951 to 1952, and served for two years as president of the Opp Chamber of Commerce from 1950 to 1951 and from 1962 to 1963. A Freemason, he served as Worshipful Master of Opp Lodge number 605 from 1949 to 1951.

He was best known for his efforts to bring about the realization of the lake and state park that is today known as the 'Frank Jackson State Park' outside Opp. Opened in 1970 as Lightwood Knot Creek State Park, the park was renamed in his honor by the State Legislature in the early 1980s.

== Early life and career ==
Jackson was born in Wilsonville, Alabama on March 13, 1915 to William and Ida Lee Jackson. He later married Mary Brown and they had three daughters, Judy, Frances, and Sue. Walter Frank Jackson had two sisters, Eunice Wood, and Louise Johnson. He also had five brothers, Terrell Jackson, Speer Jackson, Karl Jackson, Edgar Jackson, and Forrest Jackson of Leeds, Alabama.

In earlier years Jackson worked as a businessman, selling and servicing agriculture equipment.

He moved to Opp in 1945. His professional life in Opp started when he owned and operated Opp Equipment Company. In 1961 he joined Morgan Distributing Company, serving as Vice-President and General Manager. After his retirement in 1972, he continued to serve on Morgan's Board of Directors.

== Political career ==
Jackson served two terms on the Opp City Council, from 1952 to 1960. Elected from the 40th district in 1966, he served for 12 years in the Alabama House of Representatives.
