= Iron & Steel Museum of Alabama =

Industrial museum in Alabama, US

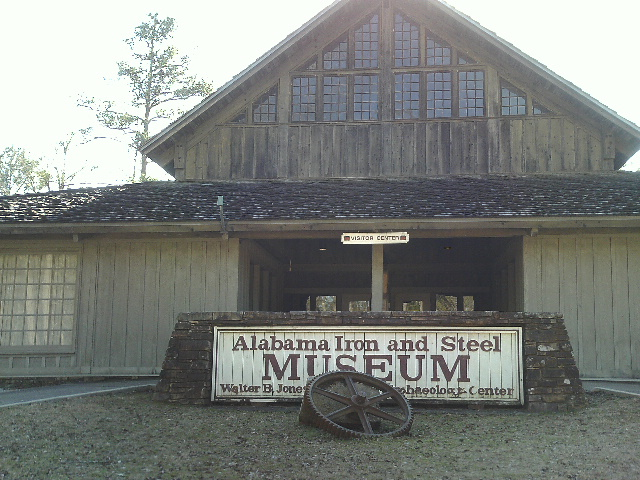
- The Iron & Steel Museum of Alabama in the Tannehill Ironworks Historical State Park
- Established: 1981
- Location: Tannehill Ironworks Historical State Park, McCalla, Alabama
- Coordinates: 33.24954°N 87.07133°W

The Iron & Steel Museum of Alabama, also known as the Tannehill Museum, is an industrial museum that demonstrates iron production in the nineteenth-century Alabama located at Tannehill Ironworks Historical State Park in McCalla, Tuscaloosa County, Alabama. Opened in 1981, it covers 13,000 square feet (1,200 m^{2}).

The museum is an interpretive center focusing on 19th-century iron-making technology. It features an extensive collection of machinery and other iron industry artifacts spanning from the time of the American Civil War until the 1960s, including belt-driven machines, a reconstruction of an 1870s machine shop, and four steam engines. The collection also houses over ten thousand artifacts and other items sourced from archaeological digs at various iron-making sites in Alabama such as the Roupes Valley Ironworks, and from the Alabama Department of Archives and History, the Henry Ford Museum, and the Washington Navy Yard. The collection includes rare steam engines, forge cams and war materials manufactured at the CS Naval Gun Works at Selma, Alabama.

In the museum, the collections and displays feature both belt-driven machines and the nineteenth century iron-making tools and products. The museum preserves more than 10,000 historical relics, including collections from the Washington Navy Yard and the Henry Ford Museum, as well as rare iron-making machinery from the Tredegar Ironworks from Virginia. The displayed ironworks show how iron making developed during the period from the Civil war to the 1960s. By visiting the museum, visitors can understand how iron making in this area grows into the later Birmingham District. This site preserves and demonstrates thousands of artefacts from archaeological digs in this area, showing the previous human activities in Alabama from the end of the Civil war to the middle of the 20 centuries. On top of that, 16 slave cabins have also been unearthed on the site in more recent excavations. The museum is connected with the best preserved furnaces at Tannehill Ironworks by the Tram Track Hiking Trail. Various interactive displays are available in the museum, which can enable the visitors to go back into the historical environments in the nineteenth-century Alabama. Visitors can follow the timeline of industrial growth to trace how iron trade developed from the ancient Egypt to modern Fairfield Works in Birmingham. The Tannehill Learning Centre currently offers educational programmes and tours to school children in this region. Museum visitors are provided with field trips during the spring and fall.

The museum underwent a major renovation of its exhibits in 2004–05. The site also has a 30-seat theatre which plays a short video on the park's history.

== History of Iron and steel in Alabama ==
=== Post-war decades: From 1860s to 1880s ===
Since the Civil War, North Alabama became one of the country's leading iron and steel manufacturers. The Birmingham District was particularly well positioned to be an iron-and-steel production centre in the southern United States. The development of Alabama's iron and steel industry was primarily stimulated by the abundance of raw materials; coal, iron ore, limestone, and dolomite. The most powerful and profitable companies in North Alabama were those which had direct control over mines, as well as other facilities necessary for extracting and assembling raw materials, such as blast furnaces. Being dependent on raw materials and relevant infrastructural facilities, iron and steel makers expanded the furnaces in Alabama. Those manufacturers also attempted to incorporate new charging machines to increase the overall production of iron. Since iron and steel production was a resource-intensive industry this required powerful iron and steel manufacturing enterprises to hold a control over the regional railroads in Alabama. A typical example was the Woodward Iron Company whose holdings were mostly linked by a company-owned railroad. This railroad originally measured 12 miles in length but the company extended it outward from its blast furnaces, to its quarries of limestone and dolomite, and further to its coal mines and ore mines.

=== In the late 1800s ===
In the late 1800s, with the large investments financed by northern bankers and southern investors, as well as the technological expertise provided by northern and mid-western engineers, the iron and steel industry began to flourish in Birmingham, Alabama. In addition, the growth of Alabama's iron and steel industry was further facilitated by the influx of a large labour force at that time. During the last decades of the nineteenth century, Alabama's agricultural sector was mainly dominated by the economic models of sharecropping and tenant farming. This tenancy system encompassed over 60 percent of the farming population in Alabama; however, under its influence, landless farmers had to suffer from a legacy of illiteracy and poverty. Driven by poverty, many labourers, including unemployed and impoverished freedmen and white people, began to search for jobs in the iron-and-steel manufacturing industry, which was considered to be a more attractive alternative to sharecropping and tenant farming. Moreover, the introduction of convict-lease system also provided Alabama's iron and steel manufacturers with abundant cheap labour. The convict-lease system functioned in the state and counties of Alabama between 1875 and 1928, through which iron manufacturers paid to the local governments in exchange for prison labour. As regulated by the system, prisoners had to work for the companies that leased them from the governments. Until its abolition in 1928, the convict-lease system had provided iron manufacturers, owners of coal mines, and other enterprises in Alabama with a substantial number of prisoners as cheap labourers. At the end of the nineteenth century, due to the region's abundant geographical resources coupled with its low raw-material assembly costs, Alabama experienced a period of rocket development.

=== In the early 1900s ===
At the beginning of the twentieth century, as steel production became more dependent on the use of electric arc furnace technology in mini-mill environments, the convenient transportation of scrap metal became a competitive advantage of manufacturers, so the availability of geographical resources was no longer the most significant driving force for iron-and-steel production growth. The Birmingham area began to invest in building the earliest mini-mills, and continued to have a strong foundry emphasis, attracting many large cast-iron pipe producers, such as American Cast Iron Pipe Company. Headquartered in Birmingham in 1905, American Cast Iron Pipe Company, with its 2,100 acre site and 2,400 employees at its operations, became the world's largest iron pipe casting plant. With advanced expertise and the latest technological innovations, Birmingham furnaces produced millions of tons of pig iron from 1990s to 1970s. A half of the produced pig iron was used for steel production, and the other half was sold as foundry iron. This trend reflected that the region's iron ore was of poor quality, so manufacturers had difficulties in extracting it. This is a geological factor that limited the further development of Alabama's iron and steel industry, despite the help of advanced technology and innovative smelting practices.

== Origins and development of the museum ==
The growth of Alabama's iron and steel industry was significantly influenced by Tannehill iron-making practices, such as using distilled coal residues as a furnace fuel, making early experimentation with coke, and reducing red iron ore from Red Mountain in a blast furnace. Due to the significant role that Tannehill pays in Alabama's iron and steel industry, the Alabama Central District of Civitan International and the representatives of the University of Alabama first proposed in the late 1960s that a state park should be built to preserve the site of Tannehill Ironworks, the birthplace of the Birmingham Iron industry. The proposal was approved by the state in 1969, and in the following year 1970, the Tannehill Historical State Parkopened to the public. There are more than 45 historical buildings in this state park, including the May Plantation Cotton Gin House, the John Wesley Hall Gristmill, as well as a collection of log cabins that trace back to the nineteenth century. Among the efforts to preserve the historical buildings and Tannehill artifacts, the Iron and Steel Museum of Alabama was built, and it opened in 1981. At present, the Tannehill Ironworks state park has been listed on the National Register of Historic Places and the Civil War Discovery Trail. In particular, the museum demonstrates how 13 iron manufacturers and 6 rolling mills worked to produce iron during the Civil war, making the Tannehill Ironworks among the best-preserved and oldest historical sites in the Southeastern part of this country. From 2004 to 2005, the museum had a significant make-over to introduce more new exhibits to the site, including an old rice-plantation-owned power source, and one of the oldest steam engines in this country. In 2017, Tannehill Ironworks, containing the Iron and Steel Museum of Alabama, became one of the six Birmingham historical sites which contributed to the creation of the Birmingham Industrial Heritage Trail. More recently, the Tannehill Furnace memorial park has become one of the most visited sites in Alabama, and the number of visitors each year exceeds 425,000. This is mainly due to the park's organisation of a variety of outdoor events and activities; for example, the Trade Days event is organised monthly from March to November each year, and visitors also have an opportunity to participant in a Civil War battle re-enactment.

== Buildings and displays ==
=== Buildings ===
The museum has several functional areas, with the main museum building covering over 13,000 square feet. The displays at the main museum building contains iron-industry content as well as a wide variety of archaeological artifacts. In addition, the museum also houses the Walter B. Jones Centre for Industrial Archaeology and includes an exhibit centre, the 1858 May Plantation Cotton Gin House, a 30-seat theatre, as well as a gift shop. The exhibition centre displays preserved Birmingham's iron-and-steel industrial artifacts over the period from 1930s to the 1960s.

== Main museum displays ==
To show the visitors how Birmingham's iron industry developed, the main museum displays a wide range of Tannehill artifacts that have survived. Visitors, through paying a visit to the museum, can learn from the graphic exhibits how iron was made by 13 different iron companies and six rolling mills and how Alabama's iron-making industry made this state the arsenal of the Confederacy. Although Alabama's iron and steel industry experienced rapid growth during the post-war decades, Alabama's iron production had already occupied a central position in the country's iron supply before the war ended. In the last two years of the Civil war, iron produced by Alabama furnaces accounted for 70% of the Confederate iron supply. To demonstrate the significant role Alabama played during the war, the museum displays a large number of wartime ironworks, including cookware, rifles and other weapons used by US soldiers (e.g. a 52 Cal. U.S. Spencer Repeater), cast-iron water pipes, CS artillery projectiles, the original parts of the Six Mile Bloomery Forge manufactured in 1860s, as well as a part of the Steve Phillips Collection. Notably, the artillery shells manufactured from 1862 to 1865 at the Naval Gun Works are also preserved in this museum, and this exhibition is considered as the South's largest collection of artillery shells. In addition to the wartime iron relics, the museum preserves and demonstrates substantial numbers of historical artifacts that have witnessed the development of Alabama's iron and steel industry, such as a cast iron water pipe made in Birmingham during the 1880s.

The Iron and Steel Museum of Alabama not only displays iron relics but also preserves archaeological artifacts uncovered in this region. The site houses Walter B. Jones Centre for Industrial Archaeology, a state geologist and archeologist who devoted his lifetime to investigating Alabama's mineral and fossil fuel resources (Garrison, 2001) His geological and archaeological works are well preserved by many museums and historical institutions, including the University of Alabama's Jones Museum at Moundville Archaeological Park, as well as the Iron and Steel Museum of Alabama. In addition to the preservation of the archaeological works written by Walter Jones, the museum is further famous for its conservation of more than 10,000 archaeological artifacts that were discovered from 8 major on-site archaeological investigations from 1956 to 2008. It is noteworthy that the main museum building also houses a small research library. In this library, those who are interested in investigating the iron-making history in this country (e.g. historical researchers, scholars, and students) can find many historical archives, published materials, records, as well as first-hand accounts.

== See also ==
- List of museums in Alabama
