= Oak Mountain State Park =

State park in Shelby County, Alabama

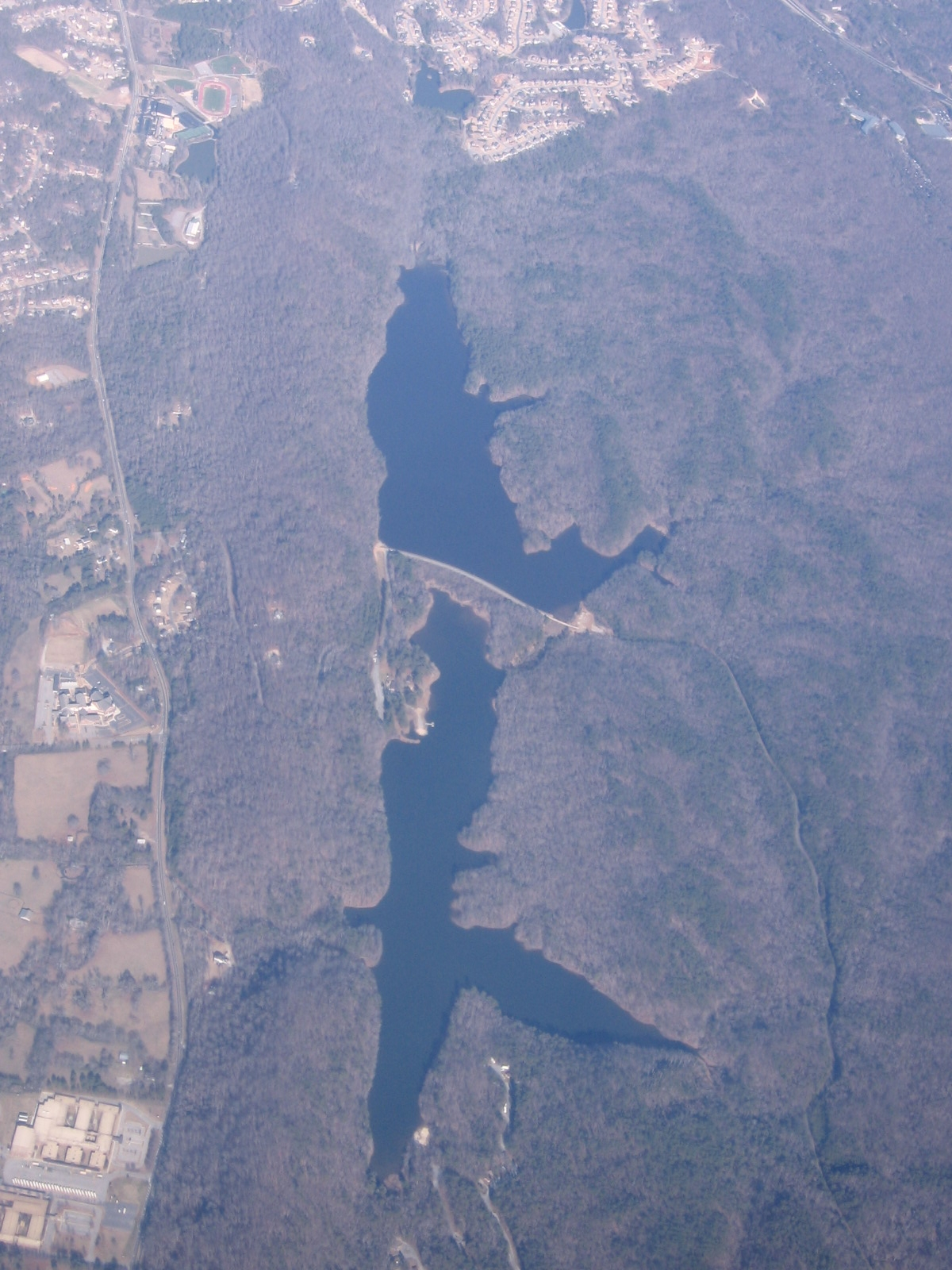
- Aerial view of Oak Mountain

- Location within Alabama
- Location: Pelham, Alabama, United States
- Coordinates: 33°22′13″N 86°42′7″W
- Area: 9,940 acres (4,020 ha)
- Elevation: 551 ft (168 m)
- Established: 1927
- Administrator: Alabama Department of Conservation and Natural Resources
- Website: Official website

Oak Mountain State Park is a public recreation area located approximately 20 miles (32 km) south of Birmingham in the northeast quadrant of the city of Pelham, Alabama, United States. It is the state's largest state park at 9,940 acres (4,020 ha) and is home to the Alabama Wildlife Center, Oak Mountain Interpretive Center, and Oak Mountain BMX Track. Park activities include hiking, running, mountain biking, swimming, camping, fishing, horseback riding, and golf. The park is managed by the Alabama Department of Conservation and Natural Resources.

== History ==
Oak Mountain was created when the State Land Act of 1927 granted the park the 940 acres (380 ha) between Double Oak Mountain and Little Oak Ridge. From 1934 to 1941, the park saw improvements made by the Civilian Conservation Corps (CCC) and the Works Progress Administration. Remnants of the CCC era—foundations, bridges and other infrastructure, often made of stone quarried from within the park—can be seen throughout the park. In 1943, the National Park Service (NPS) deeded the state park approximately 8,000 acres (3,200 ha) of surrounding land that the NPS had acquired in the 1930s. Further improvements beginning in 1971 saw development of the golf course, pro shop, cottages, administrative buildings, demonstration farm and campgrounds in the area of Dry Brook basin and adjacent to the park's lakes.

== Awards ==
In September 2020, Oak Mountain State Park was one of eleven Alabama state parks awarded Tripadvisor’s Traveler’s Choice Award, which recognizes businesses and attractions that earn consistently high user reviews.

== Activities and amenities ==
Beach/Day-Use Area - Double Oak Lake has shaded picnic areas, covered pavilions for rent, a beach for public swimming, volleyball courts, and paddle boat rentals.

Fishing - Oak Mountain Fishing Center is located at the north end of the park at the "Back Gate." The park has three fishing lakes, totaling 230 acres (93 ha), stocked with largemouth bass, bream, catfish and crappie. The park sells bait and rents flat-bottomed fishing boats. The park has facilities for launching private boats and allows the use of electric trolling motors. Fishing licenses are required and are available at the park.

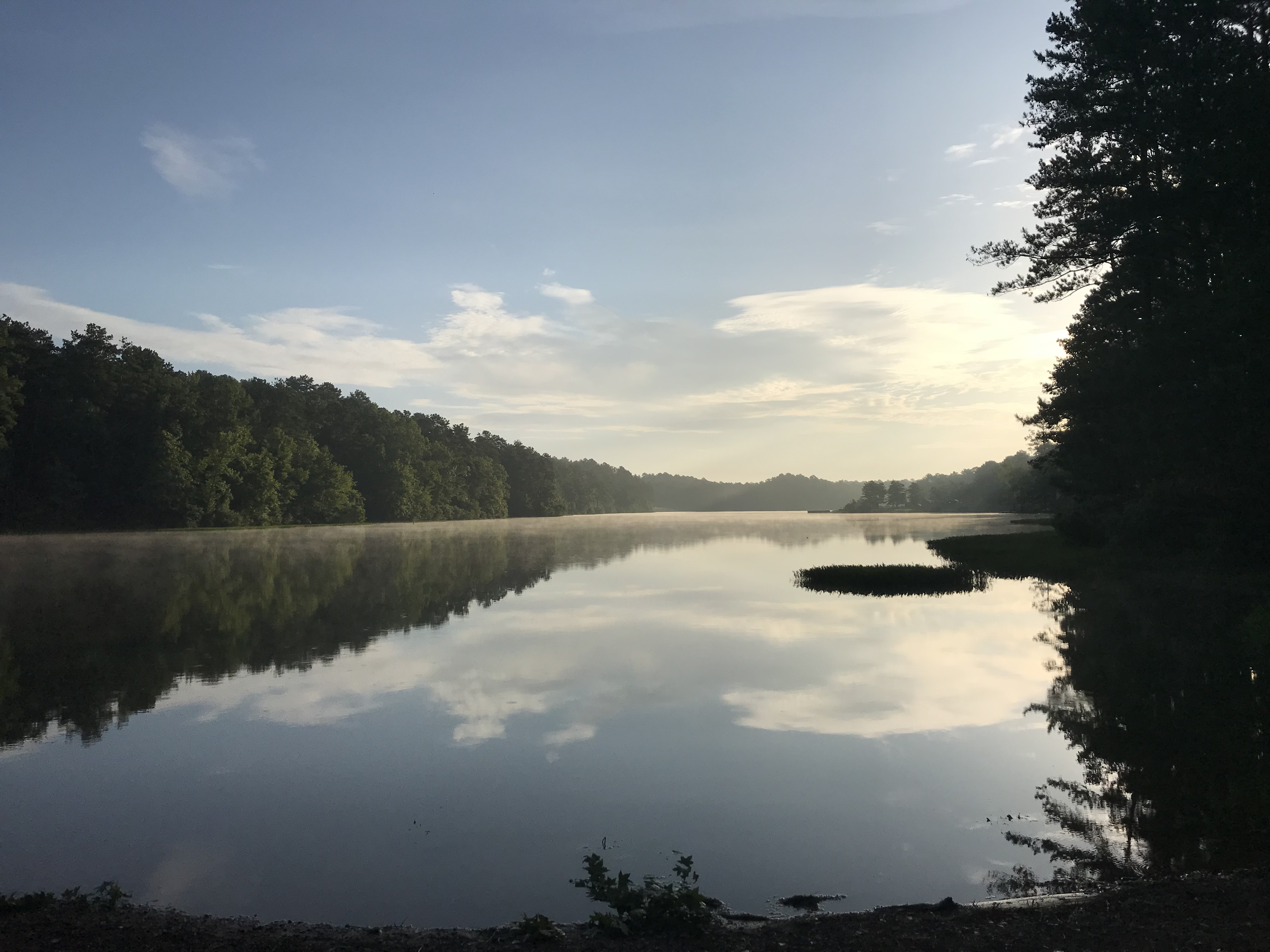
Oak Mountain Lake

Hiking - The park has 25 miles (40 km) of hiking trails that range from easy to moderate in difficulty. The Treetop Nature Trail is an elevated boardwalk where owls, turkey vultures, and other non-releaseable birds housed in large cages may be viewed.

Trail Running - Due to the wide variety of terrain and total combined distance of the park's trails, it is a popular trail running destination. The park hosts many trail races throughout the year, including multiple ultramarathons.

Camping - The park's campground has both primitive and improved primitive campsites. Backcountry camping and equestrian camping are also available.

Horseback Riding and Equestrian Camping - The 15-mile (24 km) Orange Trail (or Horse Trail) is dedicated to equestrian use, with foot and bike traffic unpermitted. The park also offers guided horseback rides.

Golf - The park's 18-hole, par 72, public golf course was designed by Earl Stone and has been rated in the top 50-75 public golf courses by Golf Digest magazine. Course amenities include Bermuda greens and tees, pro shop, snack bar, driving range, chipping green, and practice green.

- Course statistics:
  - Blue course: 6842 yards, USGA rating 71.7, slope 120
  - White course: 6341 yards, USGA rating 69.5, slope 116
  - Water on 9 of 18 holes, tree-lined fairways
  - 6 holes dogleg left, and 7 holes dogleg right
  - Course record (blue): 64, scored April 17, 1978
  - Toughest hole: #9, 382 yards, par 4
  - Easiest hole: #17, 141 yards, par 3

Hunting - Because of the abundance of deer in the park, permits are issued during certain times of the year to allow bow-hunters to take deer within park boundaries.

Mountain Biking - In 2010, the International Mountain Bicycling Association named the park's mountain biking trail system to its Epic Trail list of 52 trails worldwide.

- The Red Trail is the park's 22-mile-long (35 km), purpose-built mountain biking trail. It features 2200 total feet of climbing, one large 600-foot (180 m) climb, fast downhills and technical features for all levels of riding. There is no night riding allowed except for designated nights during the winter. The signature area of the trail is Blood Rock, a 20-yard-long (18 m) very rocky descent crossing a small water spring.
- A pump track was constructed in 2012 that includes a designated, kid-friendly, beginner area as well as a large-scale track with beginner, intermediate and advanced lines. The pump track is located at the end of Tranquility Road near the BMX Track.
- Facilities to wash bikes and a change room are located at the south trailhead in the day-use area. Riders are strongly recommended to wear helmets and yield the trail to pedestrian traffic.
- The Red Trail and pump track are maintained by the local volunteer group, the Birmingham Urban Mountain Pedalers (BUMP).

Oak Mountain BMX Track - The track first opened in 1979 and is now at its third location. The track offers year-round racing and daily riding sessions.

Alabama Wildlife Center - The Alabama Wildlife Center is the oldest and largest wildlife rehabilitation and education center in the state. The center treats injured or orphaned native Alabama birds from over 100 different species, receiving almost 2,000 avian patients each year.

Oak Mountain Interpretive Center - Oak Mountain Interpretive Center encompasses 2,500 square feet (230 m^{2}) of natural history exhibits, a meeting room and teaching lab. Live displays include native species of snakes, fish, turtles, and salamanders, and other exhibits explain the area's geography and geology. The facility is a joint venture among Oak Mountain State Park, Samford University, and Shelby County.

As of January 2021, a fee of $2–$5 was charged to enter the park.

== Annual events ==
- Bump N' Grind mountain bike race
- Oak Mountain 50K trail run
- Xterra Southeast Championship off-road triathlon
