= Frank E. Jackson Jr. =

American film director

- On the set of Prayer Life, 2007
- Born: July 2, 1965 (age 61); Chicago, Illinois
- Years active: 2005–present

Frank E. Jackson Jr. (born July 2, 1965) is an American film director, producer, and writer. He is the founder of Sunjada Productions, a production company located in the Washington, DC metropolitan area.

== Early life ==
Jackson was born in Chicago, Illinois, the son of Ella Vaughnette Chambers. He moved to Union City, Tennessee at an early age and graduated from high school in 1983. He served four years in the United States Army before entering the Naval Defense Contracting field. He spent twelve years on this career path and was working for L-3 GSI when he decided to pursue his film career on a full-time basis.

== Film career ==
Jackson's first feature film, Lorenzo & Monica, L.A.F.S received a limited theatrical release through the AMC Magic Johnson Theater. He was subsequently hired to direct three films, Painted Smiles, Prayer Life, and Feliz Cumpleanos, all of which were accepted at numerous film festivals. In May 2007, he was hired to direct an urban gangster film entitled, Ex$pendable which starred Gary Sturgis, Taral Hicks, and William L. Johnson. His most recent film, Conversations, features Tray Chaney, a regular on HBO's hit series, The Wire.

== Festival selections and awards ==
Painted Smiles

Black International Film Festival

- Official Selection

Black Art Alliance Film Festival

- Official Selection

Caribbean International Film Festival

- Official Selection

Prayer Life

The WYSIWYG Christian Film Festival

- Jury Award

The Redemptive Film Festival

- Storyteller Award

Feliz Cumpleanos

Mid-Atlantic Black Film Festival

- Official Selection

Hollywood Black Film Festival

- Official Selection

San Diego Black Film Festival

- Official Selection

San Francisco Black Film Festival

- Official Selection

Arizona Black Film Festival

- Official Selection

Utopia Film Festival

- Official Selection

Martha's Vineyard Black Film Festival

- Official Selection

Spaghetti Junction Urban Film Festival

- Official Selection

== Filmography ==
Year	Film	Credit
2005	Lorenzo & Monica, L.A.F.S.	Director, Writer, Producer
2006	Painted Smiles	Director, Editor
2007	Prayer Life	Director, Editor
2007	Feliz Cumpleanos	Director, Editor
2008	Ex$pendable	Director, Editor
2009	Conversations	Director, Producer
