= Alabama Wildlife Center =

Wildlife rehabilitation and education center in Pelham, Alabama, United States

Coordinates: 33.322°N 86.751°W

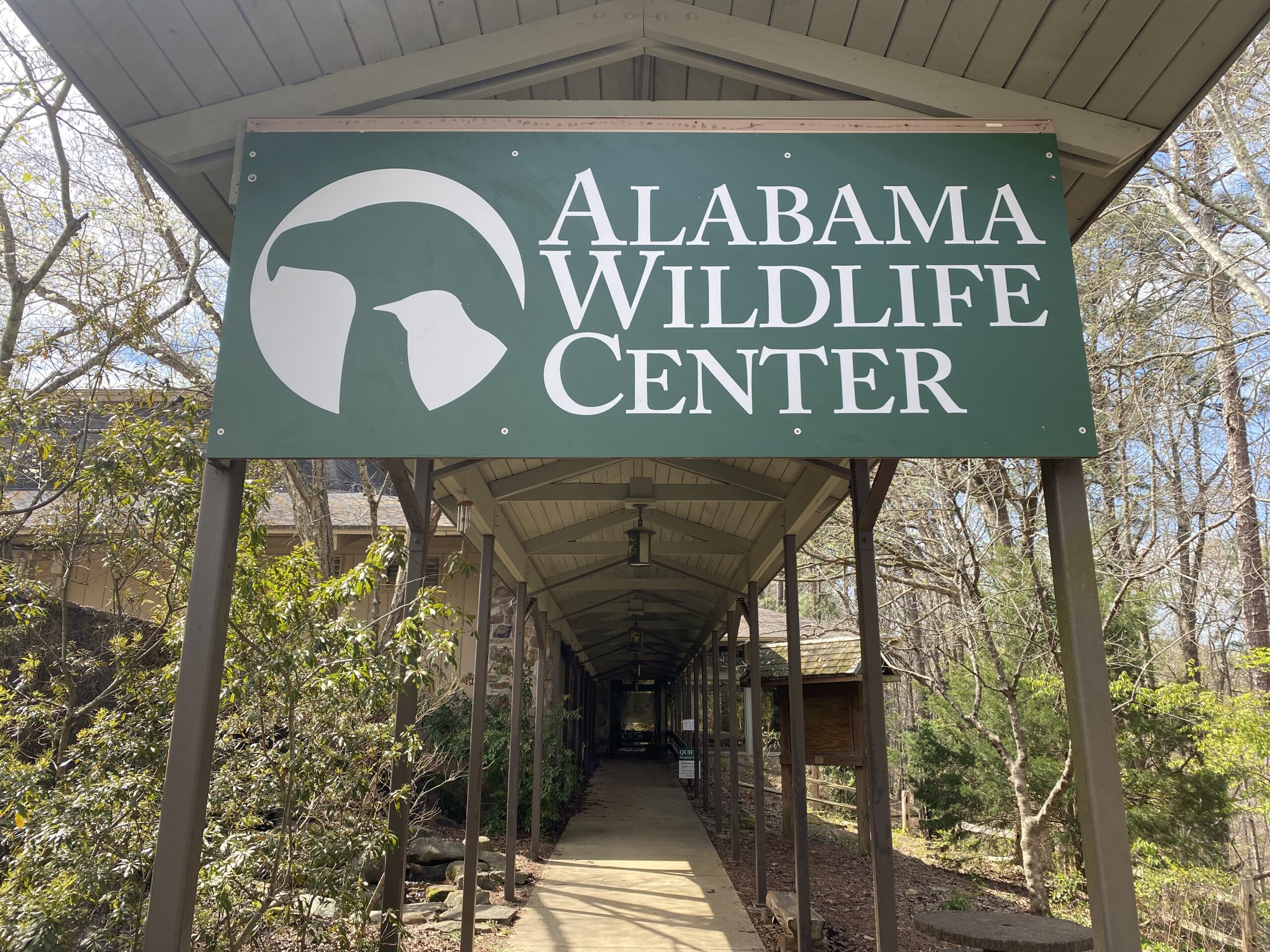
- Main entrance.
- Interactive map of Alabama Wildlife Center
- Date opened: 1977
- Location: Pelham, Alabama
- No. of species: 110+
- Director: Chris Sykes (Executive Director)
- Website: Official website

The Alabama Wildlife Center (AWC) is a wildlife rehabilitation and education center located in Oak Mountain State Park in Pelham, Alabama, United States. The organization is the largest and oldest rehabilitation center in the state. The Alabama Wildlife Center is a 501(c)(3) nonprofit organization. While being located within Oak Mountain State Park, the Alabama Wildlife Center operates independently and is not part of the state park system.

The AWC focuses on the rescue, rehabilitation, and release of native wild birds across Alabama. Each year, the AWC cares for nearly 1,800 avian patients.

The AWC also offers exhibitions and educational programs. Annually, AWC conducts over 500 events for the public about native wild birds and the significance of wildlife conservation efforts.

The Alabama Wildlife Center is open to the public throughout the year, offering a self-guided tour experience for visitors.

== History ==
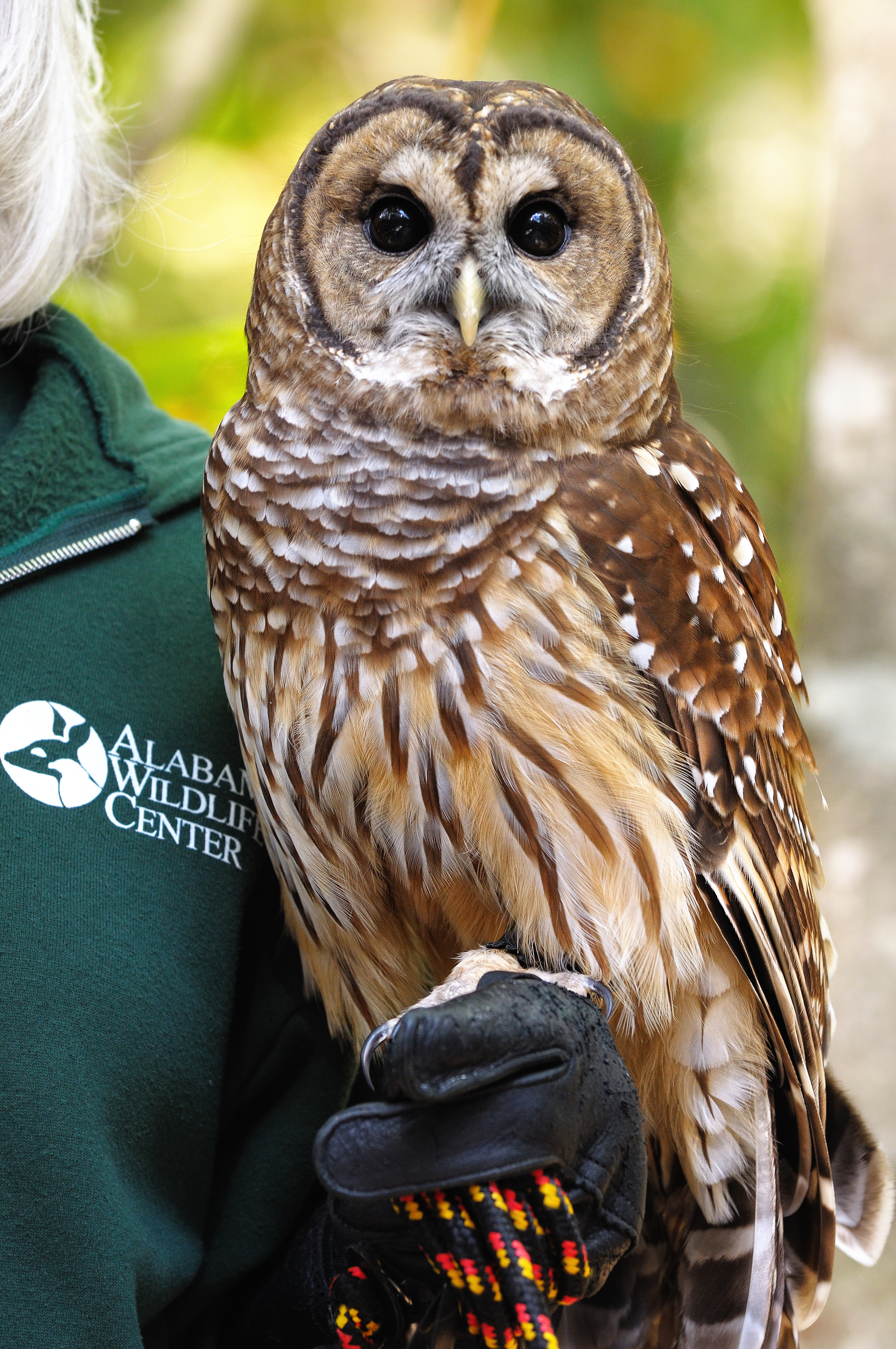
Barred owl (Strix varia) being held by a volunteer at an AWC event.

Founded in 1977 by Anne Miller, the Alabama Wildlife Center originally began as a small, volunteer-run, home-based organization. Since its founding, AWC has grown into Alabama's largest rehabilitation center. In 1980, AWC was formally established as a nonprofit organization in Alabama, and by 1981, it had achieved its status as a 501(c) nonprofit.

Historically, the AWC has provided care for more than 2,000 animals annually. This care encompassed a broad spectrum of species, including mammals such as foxes, deer, and bats; reptiles such as turtles and alligators; and a diverse array of birds, from raptors to songbirds. In 1987, the Alabama Wildlife Center relocated to Oak Mountain State Park, taking up residence in the space formerly occupied by the Foothills Restaurant.

Responding to the rising challenges affecting wild bird populations, the Alabama Wildlife Center now exclusively dedicates its efforts to the preservation and care of Alabama's native wild birds. AWC is one of only three facilities in Alabama licensed to care for federally protected and migratory bird species.

== Treetop Nature Trail ==
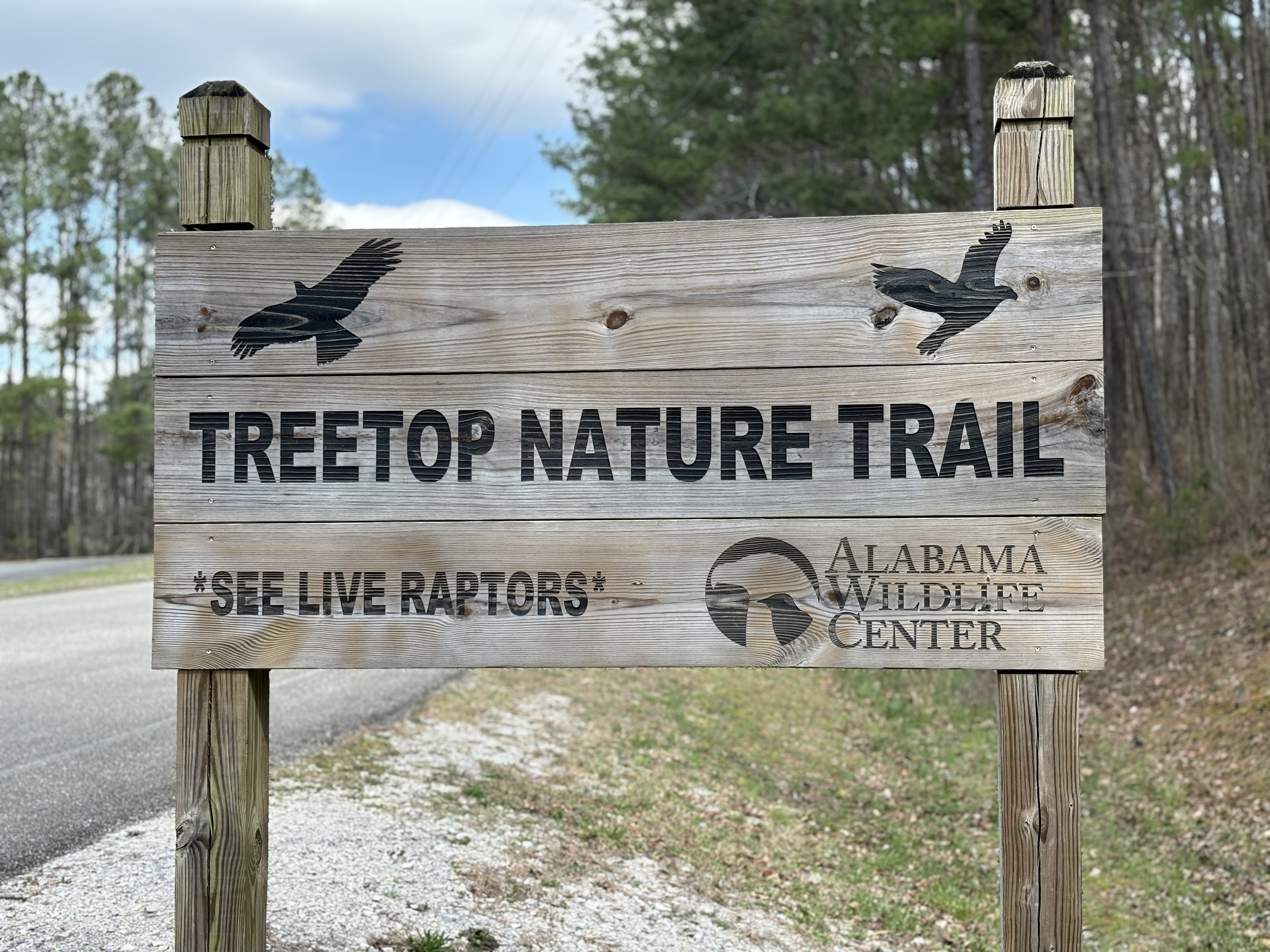
Treetop Nature Trail at Oak Mountain State Park

The Treetop Nature Trail serves as a connector between the Alabama Wildlife Center and the Treetop Nature Trail Boardwalk, offering a brief quarter-mile hike. A 2-minute drive offers an alternative route.

This boardwalk is home to native Alabama birds of prey rehabilitated by the AWC. Due to their injuries, these birds are unable to return to the wild, now serving as educational ambassadors. Treetop Nature Trail Boardwalk includes 6 enclosures each with each species of bird and their story.
