= Alabama Forestry Commission =

Government agency in Alabama, United States

- Formation: 1924
- Type: Government organization
- Purpose: Forestry
- Headquarters: 513 Madison Avenue; Montgomery, Alabama
- Coordinates: 32°22′48″N 86°18′7″W
- Region served: Alabama
- State Forester: Rick Oates
- Website: www.forestry.alabama.gov

The Alabama Forestry Commission (AFC) is the forest management agency for the U.S. state of Alabama. It was created as a state agency by an act of the Alabama Legislature in 1924. Its general mission is protecting Alabama's forests from wildfire, insects, and diseases; assisting landowners practice responsible forest management on their private property; and educating the general public about the value of Alabama's forests. It established the Alabama Champion Tree Program in 1970 and continues to maintain it.

== Organization ==
The Code of Alabama 1975 states that the commission is to be made up of seven members who are appointed by the Governor of Alabama, with the advice and consent of the Alabama Senate. Each term in office is set at five years. Two of the members must be licensed and registered foresters under state law. The members must elect from a chairman and vice-chairman from their own ranks, each of whom shall serve in that capacity for one year. Furthermore, the members of the commission must appoint, with the advice and consent of the governor, a state forester who shall serve as the executive secretary and administrative officer for the commission. The state forester must possess a minimum of a Bachelor of Science in forestry and must be licensed and registered under the forestry laws of the state with extensive experience in the forestry field.

== Functions ==
The Code of Alabama mandates nine specific functions and duties for the commission.

- To protect, conserve and increase the timber and forest resources of the state and administer all laws relating to forest management.
- To make exploration, surveys, studies and reports concerning the state's timber and forest resources and to publish those deemed to be of general interest.
- To maintain, supervise, operate and control all state forests.
- To work with the United States Secretary of Agriculture, any other federal officer, or federal agency authorized with respect to the protection of timbered and forest-producing land from fire, insects and disease, the acquisition of forest lands to be developed, administered and managed as state forests, the production, procurement and distribution of forest trees and shrub planting stock, the carrying on of an educational program in connection therewith, the assistance of the owners of farms in establishing, improving and renewing wood lots, shelter belts, windbreaks and other valuable forest growths, the growing and renewing of useful timber crops and the collection and publication of data with respect to the timber and forest resources or any other matters committed to the commission.
- To make and enforce all regulations and restrictions required for such cooperation, agreements or stipulations.
- To maintain a program of education and public awareness with respect to the timber, forest and other natural resources of the state.
- To make an annual report to the governor concerning the activities and accomplishments of the commission during the previous fiscal year;
- To recommend to the Alabama Legislature any legislation that may be needed to further protect, conserve, increase or to make available or useful the timber and forests and other natural resources of the state.
- To supervise, direct and manage all activities of the commission, its staff and employees.

== See also ==
- Government of Alabama
