= Alabama Department of Conservation and Natural Resources =

Government agency in Alabama, United States

Department overview
- Formed: 1971
- Preceding department: Alabama Department of Conservation
- Jurisdiction: State of Alabama
- Headquarters: Montgomery, Alabama
- Department executive: Christopher M. Blankenship, Commissioner of Conservation
- Website: outdooralabama.com

The Alabama Department of Conservation and Natural Resources (ADCNR) is the state agency responsible for the conservation and management of Alabama's natural resources including state parks, state lands, wildlife and aquatic resources. ADCNR also issues hunting and fishing licenses for the state. The department promotes wise stewardship and enjoyment of the state's natural resources through five divisions: Marine Resources, State Lands, State Parks and Wildlife and Freshwater Fisheries. Supporting those divisions are seven support sections: Accounting, Diversity and Recruiting, Engineering, Information and Education, Information Technology, Legal, and Personnel and Payroll.

The department is led by a commissioner who is appointed by the governor, and advised by the ten-member Conservation Advisory Board. Advisory board members are appointed by the governor for terms of six years. The governor, Agriculture and Industries Commissioner, and Alabama Cooperative Extension System Director serve as advisory board ex officio members, while the ADCNR Commissioner serves as the board's ex officio secretary.

The department receives no funding from the state general fund. Funds are generated through the sale of hunting and fishing licenses, boat registration fees, oil and gas royalties from leases of state lands, and State Parks usage fees. The funds are supplemented with federal matching funds. In 2026, however, the Alabama Legislature approved a $2 million allocation from the state's general fund specifically for threatened-species conservation work, some of which is being used to upgrade aging infrastructure at the Aquatic Biodiversity Center.

== Scope of operation ==
The department's primary responsibility is to manage the wildlife and public lands of Alabama. This includes: 22 state parks, 23 public fishing lakes, three freshwater fish hatcheries, 34 wildlife management areas, two waterfowl refuges, two wildlife sanctuaries, a mariculture center with 35 ponds, and 645,000 acres (2,610 km^{2}) of trust lands managed for the benefit of several state agencies, the General Fund and Alabama Trust Fund. The department also works to acquire additional land for public use under the Forever Wild Program and provides public education resources.

== History ==
Alabama has a long history of wildlife conservation which dates back to 1867. That year the first laws in the state to regulate hunting and fishing were introduced. With the creation of the State Oyster Inspector in 1891 the state legislature began to pave the way for the creation of a state conservation agency, and in 1907 the Department of Game and Fish was established through a bill authored by Representative Henry B. Steagall of Dale County. State Representative John Wallace of Madison County was appointed as the first commissioner of the department. The department's duties included regulating wild bird and game harvests, setting hunting seasons and harvest limits, and issuing certificates for the scientific study of birds.

In the early 1900s most of Alabama's peace officers were required by the state legislature to function as game and fish wardens in addition to their regular duties. That changed in November 1907 when H.M Henderson and W.F. Sirmon were appointed as the first official state game wardens, which also made them the first state law enforcement officers in Alabama. Sixty five non-salary officers were soon added, and by 1922 game wardens were salaried and hired through an examination and training process.

In 1915 several agencies and commissions responsible for the state's wildlife and natural resources were consolidated under the Department of Game and Fish, and in 1919 the agency was renamed the Alabama Department of Conservation. The department would undergo many name changes as the focus and overall scope of operations evolved until settling on its current name, the Alabama Department of Conservation and Natural Resources, in 1971.

== Magazine ==
The department has published a magazine continuously since 1929. From 1929 to 1940 the magazine was called Alabama Game and Fish News. Then in 1940 the name was changed to Alabama Conservation until it was changed to Outdoor Alabama in 1995. Since the magazine's inception it has profiled the state's wildlife, natural diversity, outdoor recreational opportunities and scenic beauty.

== Divisions ==
Marine Resources

The Marine Resources Division manages state marine resources through research and enforcement programs. In 2013, the former Marine Police were merged into the Alabama Law Enforcement Agency as the Alabama Marine Police.

State Lands

The State Lands Division manages undeveloped state-owned land, most of which is held in trust for specific public purposes. The State Lands Division is a law enforcement entity with police powers statewide.

State Parks

The State Parks Division is the division which is most well known by the public due to the role of maintaining and operating Alabama's State Parks. The division is charged with acquiring and preserving natural areas, managing those areas for public benefit, and educating the public on Alabama's environment.

Wildlife and Freshwater Fisheries

The Wildlife and Freshwater Fisheries Division manages and protects wildlife and freshwater aquatic resources in Alabama and is responsible for the management of Alabama's Wildlife Management Areas (WMAs). The Wildlife and Freshwater Fisheries Division is a law enforcement entity with police powers statewide.

Administrative Division

The Administrative Division provides support services such as human resources, legal, and payroll to the operating divisions.

== Department activities ==
=== Forever Wild ===
Amendment 543 of the Constitution of Alabama of 1901 established the Forever Wild Land Trust in 1992. Run by the Department's State Lands Division, the Trust allows for the purchase of land for public recreational use, the creation of nature preserves, additions to Wildlife Management Areas and state parks, and as a way to preserve Alabama's natural heritage. As of January 2009 Forever Wild has acquired 67 tracts of land totaling 139,844 acres (565.9 km^{2}).

=== Alabama Aquatic Biodiversity Center ===
Run by the Department's Wildlife and Freshwater Fisheries Division, the AABC is the largest state non-game recovery program in the United States. Located in Marion, the center's mission is to promote the conservation and restoration of rare freshwater species in Alabama and in turn restore cleaner water to state waterways. Recent projects include an extensive effort to restore various aquatic mollusk populations in the state that have been in decline for various environmental reasons. The Mobile River Basin will be the first major focus of the mollusk restoration effort. As of 2026, the center operated with only four full-time staff and an average annual budget of about $750,000, part of the department's roughly $450 million overall budget, of which only about one percent was directed toward non-game species such as mussels, snails, crayfish, and imperiled fish. Center director Paul Johnson described the program's funding situation by saying, "We have the most species and the fewest dollars." Since its founding, the AABC has released roughly 300,000 captive-raised mussels across more than a dozen species into Alabama's rivers, and some reintroduced populations, including the federally endangered pale lilliput (Toxolasma cylindrellus), have become self-sustaining enough that the species may soon be eligible for removal from the endangered species list.

=== Artificial Reef System ===
With approximately 1,200 square miles (3,100 km^{2}) of offshore waters included in the Alabama's Artificial Reef Program it is currently the largest in the United States. The program is the product of a cooperative agreement between the U. S. Army Corps of Engineers and the Department's Marine Resources Division. Started in 1953, the program continues to expand helping to reinforce the Gulf's natural aquatic diversity.

=== State Parks System ===
The Alabama State Parks system encompasses approximately 48,000 acres (190 km^{2}) of land and water in Alabama. Park activities and accommodations include hotels and motels, tent and RV camping, boating, hiking, swimming, championship-level golf courses, and other activities. Park environments range from Gulf Coast beaches to the Appalachian Mountains, which showcase the state's dynamic natural diversity.

=== Public Education ===
A major component of the department's mission is education. The department's Marine Police Division, in a joint effort with the Alabama State Department of Education, Driver Education Section, teaches boating education in public schools as required by the Alabama Boating Safety Reform Act of 1994. The act extends the same laws that apply to driving a car or other motorized vehicle to boating.

In 2008 the State Lands Division opened the 5 Rivers Delta Resource Center. The conservation education facility also serves as hub of outdoor recreation in the Mobile-Tensaw River Delta in South Alabama.

In addition to hunting and boating education programs the Wildlife and Freshwater Fisheries Division conducts several educational outreach programs such as Archery in Schools and various fishing education classes.

Department biologists conduct a wide array of scientific studies of Alabama's plant and animal species including the monitoring of wildlife and aquatic species populations as well as habitat studies that will inform future management practices. Department Biologists also regularly contribute to Outdoor Alabama magazine.

In addition to publishing Outdoor Alabama, the Department's Information and Education section annually conducts several teacher training workshops designed to help teachers incorporate conservation and natural resources education into public school curricula.

== Fallen officers ==
Since the establishment of the Alabama Department of Conservation and Natural Resources, 7 officers have died in the line of duty. The following list contains officers from both the Wildlife & Freshwater Fishers Division and the Marine Police Division.

| Officer | Date of death | Details |
|---|---|---|
| Conservation Officer Loyd C. Hays | Friday, May 1, 1964 | Gunfire |
| Marine Patrolman Walter E. Sawyer | Wednesday, December 7, 1966 | Automobile accident |
| Conservation Officer Frank Stewart Jr. | Sunday, December 24, 1978 | Gunfire |
| Conservation Officer Cecil C. Chatman | Sunday, November 28, 1982 | Assault |
| Deputy Game Warden James C. Vines | Saturday, January 26, 1985 | Gunfire |
| Game Warden Jimmy Dean Hutto | Monday, March 25, 2002 | Gunfire |
| Conservation Officer James Lansford (Lance) Horner Jr. | Sunday, June 22, 2003 | Drowned |

== See also ==
- List of state and territorial fish and wildlife management agencies in the United States
- List of law enforcement agencies in Alabama

== Additional Sources ==
Alabama Department of Conservation and Natural Resources: Functional Analysis and Records Disposition Authority 2002, held on file at the Alabama Department of Archives and History, also available online.

Alabama's Artificial Reef Program: A Brief History, available online.

The First 100 Years: 2007 Marks the 100th Anniversary of Alabama's Conservation Enforcement Officers, by Kevin Dodd, Outdoor Alabama magazine, October 2007.

Chronological List of ADNCR publications, held on file at the Alabama Department of Archives and History, also available online.

ADCNR 2007-08 Annual Report, online. [8]
