= Outline of Alabama =

U.S. State

The flag of Alabama

The seal of Alabama

The location of the state of Alabama in the United States of America

The following outline is provided as an overview of and topical guide to the U.S. state of Alabama:

Alabama (/ˌæləˈbæmə/ , AL-ə-BAM-ə) is a state in the Southeastern and Deep Southern regions of the United States. It borders Tennessee to the north, Georgia to the east, Florida and the Gulf of Mexico to the south, and Mississippi to the west. Alabama is the 30th largest by area, and the 24th-most populous of the 50 U.S. states.

== General reference ==
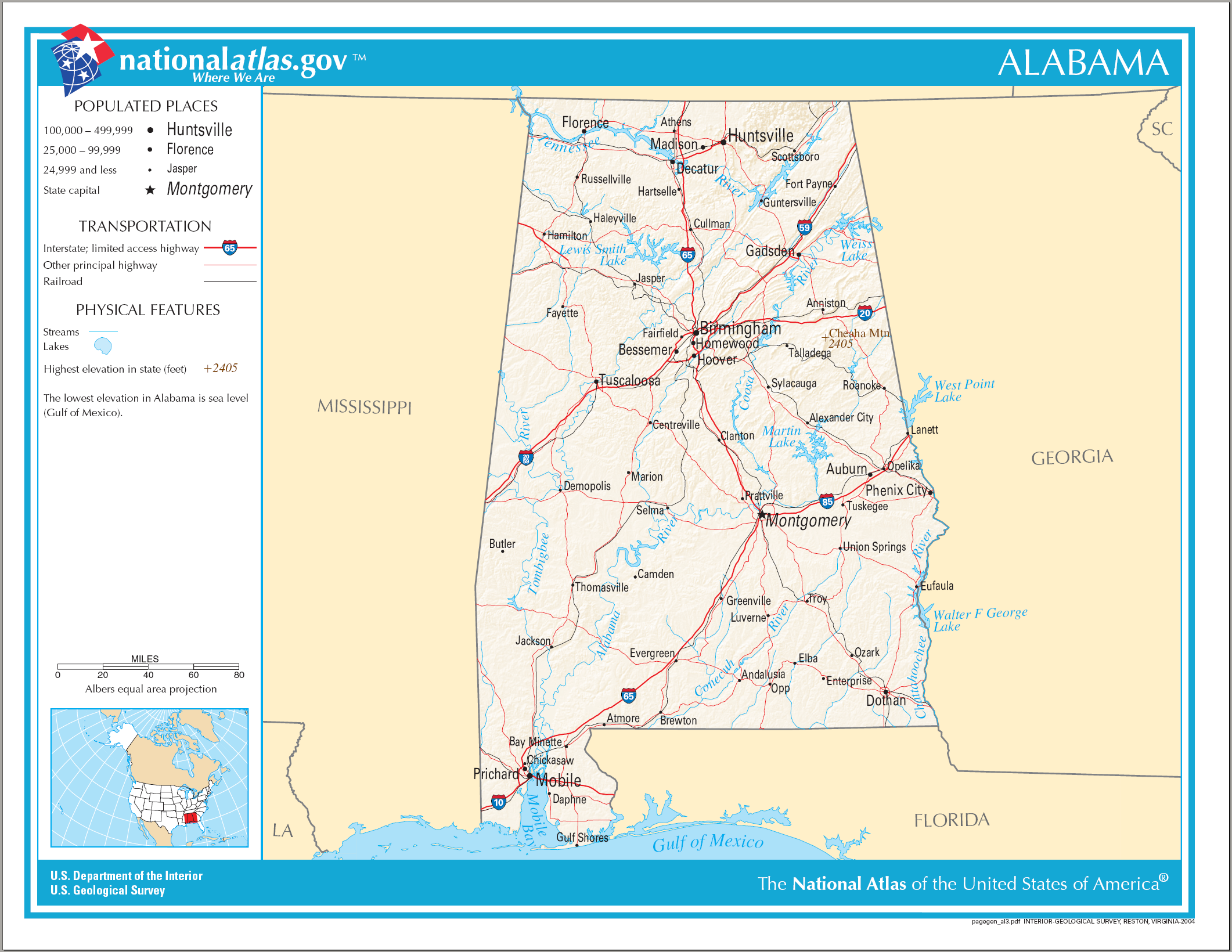
An enlargeable map of the state of Alabama

- Names
  - Common name: Alabama
    - Pronunciation: /ˌæləˈbæmə/
  - Official name: State of Alabama
  - Abbreviations and name codes
    - Postal symbol: AL
    - ISO 3166-2 code: US-AL
    - Internet second-level domain: .al.us
  - Nicknames
    - Cotton Plantation State
    - Cotton State
    - Heart of Dixie
    - Lizard State
    - Yellowhammer State
    - Camellia State
- Adjectival: Alabama
- Demonyms
  - Alabamian
  - Alabaman

== Geography of Alabama ==
Geography of Alabama

- Alabama is: a U.S. state, a federal state of the United States of America
- Location
  - Northern Hemisphere
  - Western Hemisphere
    - Americas
      - North America
        - Anglo America
        - Northern America
          - United States of America
            - Contiguous United States
              - Central United States
                - East South Central States
              - Southern United States
                - Deep South
                  - Gulf Coast of the United States
                - Southeastern United States
- Population of Alabama: 4,779,736 (2010 U.S. Census)
- Area of Alabama: 52,419 sq mi (135,765 km^{2})
- Atlas of Alabama

=== Places in Alabama ===
- List of places in Alabama
  - List of places in Alabama: A–C
  - List of places in Alabama: D–H
  - List of places in Alabama: I–M
  - List of places in Alabama: N–R
  - List of places in Alabama: S–Z
- Historic places in Alabama
  - Ghost towns in Alabama
  - National Historic Landmarks in Alabama
  - National Register of Historic Places listings in Alabama
    - Bridges on the National Register of Historic Places in Alabama
- National Natural Landmarks in Alabama
- State parks in Alabama
- Properties on the Alabama Register of Landmarks and Heritage
  - Properties on the Alabama Register of Landmarks and Heritage by county (Autauga–Choctaw)
  - Properties on the Alabama Register of Landmarks and Heritage by county (Clarke–Dallas)
  - Properties on the Alabama Register of Landmarks and Heritage by county (DeKalb–Jackson)
  - Properties on the Alabama Register of Landmarks and Heritage by county (Jefferson–Macon)
  - Properties on the Alabama Register of Landmarks and Heritage by county (Madison–Perry)
  - Properties on the Alabama Register of Landmarks and Heritage by county (Pickens–Winston)

=== Environment of Alabama ===
- Climate of Alabama
- Geology of Alabama
- Protected areas in Alabama
  - State forests of Alabama
  - List of nature centers in Alabama
- Superfund sites in Alabama
- Wildlife of Alabama
  - Fauna of Alabama
    - Amphibians of Alabama
    - Mammals of Alabama
    - Reptiles of Alabama
  - Flora of Alabama
    - Botanical gardens and arboretums in Alabama
    - Trees of Alabama

==== Natural geographic features of Alabama ====
- Islands of Alabama
- Lakes of Alabama
- Mountain passes in Alabama
- Rivers of Alabama

=== Regions of Alabama ===
- North Alabama
- Central Alabama
- South Alabama
- Black Belt
- Lower Alabama
- Mobile Bay

==== Metropolitan areas of Alabama ====
Metropolitan areas of Alabama Metropolitan areas of Alabama, ranked by size:

1. Birmingham
2. Mobile
3. Huntsville
4. Montgomery
5. Tuscaloosa
6. Decatur
7. Florence-Muscle Shoals
8. Dothan
9. Auburn
10. Anniston-Oxford
11. Gadsden

==== Administrative divisions of Alabama ====
Types of administrative divisions in Alabama:

- Alabama's congressional districts
- The 67 counties of the state of Alabama
- Cities in Alabama

===== Alabama Congressional districts =====
Alabama's congressional districts

- Alabama's 1st congressional district
- Alabama's 2nd congressional district
- Alabama's 3rd congressional district
- Alabama's 4th congressional district
- Alabama's 5th congressional district
- Alabama's 6th congressional district
- Alabama's 7th congressional district
- Alabama's 8th congressional district
- Alabama's 9th congressional district
- Alabama's 10th congressional district
- Alabama's at-large congressional district

===== Counties of Alabama =====
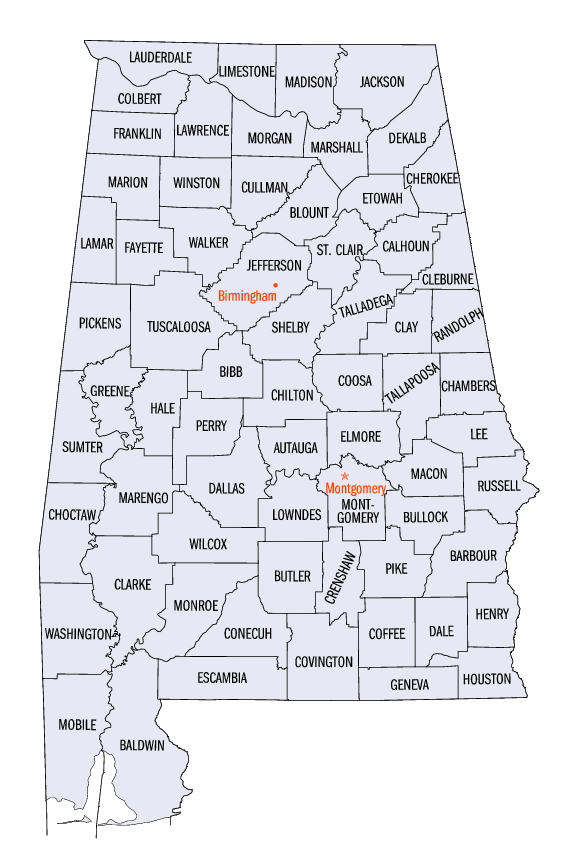
An enlargeable map of the 67 counties of the state of Alabama

1. Autauga County, Alabama
2. Baldwin County, Alabama
3. Barbour County, Alabama
4. Bibb County, Alabama
5. Blount County, Alabama
6. Bullock County, Alabama
7. Butler County, Alabama
8. Calhoun County, Alabama
9. Chambers County, Alabama
10. Cherokee County, Alabama
11. Chilton County, Alabama
12. Choctaw County, Alabama
13. Clarke County, Alabama
14. Clay County, Alabama
15. Cleburne County, Alabama
16. Coffee County, Alabama
17. Colbert County, Alabama
18. Conecuh County, Alabama
19. Coosa County, Alabama
20. Covington County, Alabama
21. Crenshaw County, Alabama
22. Cullman County, Alabama
23. Dale County, Alabama
24. Dallas County, Alabama
25. DeKalb County, Alabama
26. Elmore County, Alabama
27. Escambia County, Alabama
28. Etowah County, Alabama
29. Fayette County, Alabama
30. Franklin County, Alabama
31. Geneva County, Alabama
32. Greene County, Alabama
33. Hale County, Alabama
34. Henry County, Alabama
35. Houston County, Alabama
36. Jackson County, Alabama
37. Jefferson County, Alabama
38. Lamar County, Alabama
39. Lauderdale County, Alabama
40. Lawrence County, Alabama
41. Lee County, Alabama
42. Limestone County, Alabama
43. Lowndes County, Alabama
44. Macon County, Alabama
45. Madison County, Alabama
46. Marengo County, Alabama
47. Marion County, Alabama
48. Marshall County, Alabama
49. Mobile County, Alabama
50. Monroe County, Alabama
51. Montgomery County, Alabama
52. Morgan County, Alabama
53. Perry County, Alabama
54. Pickens County, Alabama
55. Pike County, Alabama
56. Randolph County, Alabama
57. Russell County, Alabama
58. Shelby County, Alabama
59. St. Clair County, Alabama
60. Sumter County, Alabama
61. Talladega County, Alabama
62. Tallapoosa County, Alabama
63. Tuscaloosa County, Alabama
64. Walker County, Alabama
65. Washington County, Alabama
66. Wilcox County, Alabama
67. Winston County, Alabama

===== Municipalities in Alabama =====
- Cities in Alabama (10 with largest population included below)
  - State capital of Alabama: Montgomery
  - City nicknames in Alabama
  - Auburn, Alabama
  - Birmingham, Alabama
  - Decatur, Alabama
  - Dothan, Alabama
  - Hoover, Alabama
  - Huntsville, Alabama
  - Madison, Alabama
  - Mobile, Alabama
  - Montgomery, Alabama
  - St. Stephens, Alabama
  - Tuscaloosa, Alabama

=== Demography of Alabama ===
Demographics of Alabama

== Government and politics of Alabama ==
- Form of government: U.S. state government
- Alabama's congressional delegations
- Alabama State Capitol
- Elections in Alabama
  - Electoral reform in Alabama

=== Branches of the government of Alabama ===
Government of Alabama

==== Executive branch of the government of Alabama ====
- Governor of Alabama
  - Lieutenant Governor of Alabama
  - Secretary of State of Alabama
- State departments
  - Alabama Department of Transportation
  - Alabama Department of Agriculture and Industries
  - Alabama Department of Archives and History
  - Alabama Department of Conservation and Natural Resources
  - Alabama Department of Corrections
  - Alabama Department of Education
  - Alabama Department of Environmental Management
  - Alabama Department of Homeland Security
  - Alabama Department of Mental Health
  - Alabama Department of Public Health
  - Alabama Department of Public Safety
  - Alabama Department of Transportation
  - Alabama Department of Youth Services

==== Legislative branch of the government of Alabama ====
- Alabama Legislature (bicameral)
  - Upper house: Alabama Senate
  - Lower house: Alabama House of Representatives

==== Judicial branch of the government of Alabama ====
Courts of Alabama

- Supreme Court of Alabama
- United States District Court for the Middle District of Alabama
- United States District Court for the Northern District of Alabama
- United States District Court for the Southern District of Alabama

=== Law and order in Alabama ===
- Cannabis in Alabama
- Capital punishment in Alabama
  - Individuals executed in Alabama
- Constitution of Alabama
- Crime in Alabama
- Gun laws in Alabama
- Law enforcement in Alabama
  - Law enforcement agencies in Alabama
  - List of Alabama state prisons
- Same-sex marriage in Alabama

=== Military in Alabama ===
- Alabama Air National Guard
- Alabama Army National Guard

== History of Alabama ==
History of Alabama

=== History of Alabama, by period ===
- Prehistory of Alabama
- Spanish colony of Florida, 1565–1763
- French colony of Louisiane, 1699–1763
- British Colony of Georgia, 1732–1776
- French and Indian War, 1754–1763
  - Treaty of Paris of 1763
- British Colony of West Florida, 1763–1783
- British Indian Reserve, 1763–1783
  - Royal Proclamation of 1763
- American Revolutionary War, April 19, 1775 – September 3, 1783
  - United States Declaration of Independence, July 4, 1776
  - Treaty of Paris, September 3, 1783
- Territorial claims of State of South Carolina along 35th parallel north, 1776–1787
- Territorial claims of State of Georgia from 31st parallel north to 35th parallel north, 1776–1802
- Spanish colony of Florida Occidental, 1783–1821
  - Treaty of San Lorenzo of 1795
  - Republic of West Florida, 1810
- Territory of Mississippi, 1798–1817
  - War of 1812, June 18, 1812 – March 23, 1815
    - United States unilaterally annexes Mobile District of Spanish Florida Occidental, 1812
    - Treaty of Ghent, December 24, 1814
  - Creek War, 1813–1814
- Territory of Alabama, 1817–1819
  - History of slavery in Alabama
  - Adams-Onís Treaty of 1819
- State of Alabama becomes 22nd state admitted to the United States of America on December 14, 1819
  - Trail of Tears, 1830–1838
  - Mexican–American War, April 25, 1846 – February 2, 1848
  - Fourth state to declare secession from the United States of America on January 11, 1861
  - Founding state of the Confederate States of America on February 8, 1861
  - American Civil War, April 12, 1861 – May 13, 1865
    - Alabama in the American Civil War
      - Battle of Day's Gap, April 30, 1863
      - Battle of Athens, January 26, 1864
      - Battle of Mobile Bay, August 2–23, 1864
      - Franklin-Nashville Campaign, October 5 – December 25, 1864
        - Battle of Decatur, October 26–29, 1864
      - Battle of Spanish Fort, March 27 – April 8, 1865
      - Battle of Selma, April 2, 1865
      - Battle of Fort Blakeley, April 2–9, 1865
  - Alabama in Reconstruction, 1865–1868
    - Seventh former Confederate state readmitted to the United States of America on July 13, 1868
  - Historical Panorama of Alabama Agriculture, October 2–7, 1939
  - Civil Rights Movement from December 1, 1955, to January 20, 1969
    - Montgomery bus boycott, December 1, 1955 – December 20, 1956
    - Birmingham campaign, spring, 1963
    - Selma to Montgomery marches, March 7–25, 1965

=== History of Alabama, by region ===
==== History of Alabama, by county ====
1. History of Autauga County, Alabama
2. History of Baldwin County, Alabama
3. History of Barbour County, Alabama
4. History of Bibb County, Alabama
5. History of Blount County, Alabama
6. History of Bullock County, Alabama
7. History of Butler County, Alabama
8. History of Calhoun County, Alabama
9. History of Chambers County, Alabama
10. History of Cherokee County, Alabama
11. History of Chilton County, Alabama
12. History of Choctaw County, Alabama
13. History of Clarke County, Alabama
14. History of Clay County, Alabama
15. History of Cleburne County, Alabama
16. History of Coffee County, Alabama
17. History of Colbert County, Alabama
18. History of Conecuh County, Alabama
19. History of Coosa County, Alabama
20. History of Covington County, Alabama
21. History of Crenshaw County, Alabama
22. History of Cullman County, Alabama
23. History of Dale County, Alabama
24. History of Dallas County, Alabama
25. History of DeKalb County, Alabama
26. History of Elmore County, Alabama
27. History of Escambia County, Alabama
28. History of Etowah County, Alabama
29. History of Fayette County, Alabama
30. History of Franklin County, Alabama
31. History of Geneva County, Alabama
32. History of Greene County, Alabama
33. History of Hale County, Alabama
34. History of Henry County, Alabama
35. History of Houston County, Alabama
36. History of Jackson County, Alabama
37. History of Jefferson County, Alabama
38. History of Lamar County, Alabama
39. History of Lauderdale County, Alabama
40. History of Lawrence County, Alabama
41. History of Lee County, Alabama
42. History of Limestone County, Alabama
43. History of Lowndes County, Alabama
44. History of Macon County, Alabama
45. History of Madison County, Alabama
46. History of Marengo County, Alabama
47. History of Marion County, Alabama
48. History of Marshall County, Alabama
49. History of Mobile County, Alabama
50. History of Monroe County, Alabama
51. History of Montgomery County, Alabama
52. History of Morgan County, Alabama
53. History of Perry County, Alabama
54. History of Pickens County, Alabama
55. History of Pike County, Alabama
56. History of Randolph County, Alabama
57. History of Russell County, Alabama
58. History of Shelby County, Alabama
59. History of St. Clair County, Alabama
60. History of Sumter County, Alabama
61. History of Talladega County, Alabama
62. History of Tallapoosa County, Alabama
63. History of Tuscaloosa County, Alabama
64. History of Walker County, Alabama
65. History of Washington County, Alabama
66. History of Wilcox County, Alabama
67. History of Winston County, Alabama

==== History of Alabama, by city ====
- History of Auburn, Alabama
- History of Birmingham, Alabama
- History of Decatur, Alabama
- History of Dothan, Alabama
- History of Hoover, Alabama
- History of Huntsville, Alabama
- History of Madison, Alabama
- History of Mobile, Alabama
  - History of sports in Mobile, Alabama
- History of Montgomery, Alabama
  - Browder v. Gayle
  - Montgomery bus boycott
  - Civil Rights Memorial
  - How Long, Not Long
  - Lehman Brothers
  - Lightning Route
  - Mid-November 2006 tornado outbreak
  - Montgomery Convention
  - Montgomery Improvement Association
  - Montgomery and West Point Railroad
  - Selma to Montgomery marches
  - Women's Political Council
  - Wright Flying School
- History of St. Stephens, Alabama
- History of Tuscaloosa, Alabama

=== History of Alabama, by subject ===
- List of the oldest buildings in Alabama
- History of the Alabama Cooperative Extension System
- List of Alabama state legislatures
- History of slavery in Alabama
- History of sports in Alabama
  - History of sports in Mobile, Alabama
- History of universities in Alabama
  - History of the University of West Alabama
  - History of the University of North Alabama
  - History of the University of Alabama

== Culture of Alabama ==
- Architecture in Alabama
  - List of oldest buildings in Alabama
  - List of tallest buildings in Alabama
- Museums in Alabama
- Religion in Alabama
  - The Church of Jesus Christ of Latter-day Saints in Alabama
  - Episcopal Diocese of Alabama
- Scouting in Alabama
- State symbols of Alabama
  - Flag of the State of Alabama
  - Great Seal of the State of Alabama

=== The arts in Alabama ===
- Music of Alabama

=== Sports in Alabama ===
Sports in Alabama

- Professional sports teams in Alabama

==== College sports in Alabama ====
- Alabama Crimson Tide
  - Alabama Crimson Tide baseball
  - Alabama Crimson Tide bowl games
  - Alabama Crimson Tide football
    - Alabama Crimson Tide football All-Americans
    - Alabama Crimson Tide football seasons
    - Alabama Crimson Tide football under Nick Saban
    - Alabama Crimson Tide head football coaches
    - Alabama Crimson Tide home football stadiums
    - Alabama Crimson Tide players in the College Football Hall of Fame
    - Alabama Crimson Tide players in the College Football Hall of Fame
    - Alabama Crimson Tide players in the NFL draft
    - Alabama Crimson Tide starting quarterbacks
  - Alabama Crimson Tide golf
  - Alabama Crimson Tide men's basketball
  - Alabama Crimson Tide softball
  - Alabama Crimson Tide women's basketball
  - Alabama Crimson Tide women's gymnastics
  - Alabama Crimson Tide women's soccer
  - Alabama Crimson Tide women's volleyball
- Indy Grand Prix of Alabama
  - 2010 Indy Grand Prix of Alabama
  - 2011 Indy Grand Prix of Alabama
  - 2012 Indy Grand Prix of Alabama
  - 2013 Honda Indy Grand Prix of Alabama
  - 2014 Honda Indy Grand Prix of Alabama
  - 2015 Honda Indy Grand Prix of Alabama
- Alabama High School Athletic Association championships
- Alabama State Hornets in the NFL draft

== Economy and infrastructure of Alabama ==
Economy of Alabama

- Agriculture in Alabama
  - Fishing in Alabama
- Communications in Alabama
  - Newspapers in Alabama
  - Radio stations in Alabama
  - Television stations in Alabama
- Energy in Alabama
  - Power stations in Alabama
  - Solar power in Alabama
- Health care in Alabama
  - Hospitals in Alabama

=== Transportation in Alabama ===
Transportation in Alabama

- Airports in Alabama
- East and West Railroad of Alabama
- Interstate 10 in Alabama
- Interstate 20 in Alabama
- Interstate 65 in Alabama
- Interstate 85 in Alabama
- List of Alabama railroads
- List of Interstate Highways in Alabama
- List of U.S. Highways in Alabama
- List of state highways in Alabama
- U.S. Route 278 in Alabama
- U.S. Route 431 in Alabama
- Vehicle registration plates of Alabama
- Western Railway of Alabama

== Education in Alabama ==
Education in Alabama

- Schools in Alabama
  - School districts in Alabama
    - High schools in Alabama
  - Colleges and universities in Alabama
    - Alabama State University
    - University of Alabama
      - A-Day (University of Alabama)
      - University of Alabama System
        - University of Alabama at Birmingham
          - List of University of Alabama at Birmingham people
        - University of Alabama in Huntsville
          - 2010 University of Alabama in Huntsville shooting
      - University of Alabama departments
        - University of Alabama College of Communication and Information Sciences
        - University of Alabama School of Dentistry
        - University of Alabama School of Law
        - University of Alabama School of Medicine
      - University of Alabama Arboretum
      - University of Alabama fraternities and sororities
      - University of Alabama Observatories
        - University of Alabama Observatory
        - Old University of Alabama Observatory
      - List of University of Alabama people
      - Presidents of the University of Alabama
        - President's Mansion (University of Alabama)
      - University of Alabama Press
      - University of Alabama Quad
      - University of Alabama traditions
    - University of North Alabama
      - University of North Alabama Planetarium and Observatory
      - University of North Alabama President's Home
    - University of South Alabama
    - University of West Alabama

== Publications about Alabama ==
- Encyclopedia of Alabama

== See also ==
- Topic overview:
  - Alabama
  - Index of Alabama-related articles

- Gun laws in Alabama
- Attorney General of Alabama
- Cannabis in Alabama
- Coat of arms of Alabama
- African Americans in Alabama

- Aviation in Alabama
- List of Baptist churches in Alabama
- Roman Catholic Diocese of Birmingham in Alabama
- Association of Alabama Camps
- Blue Cross and Blue Shield of Alabama
- Canebrake (region of Alabama)
- CenturyTel of Alabama
- Children's of Alabama
- Crazy in Alabama
- Echota Cherokee Tribe of Alabama
- Effects of Hurricane Dennis in Alabama
- Flag of Alabama
- Flower from the Fields of Alabama
- Grand Lodge of Alabama
- Hispanic Interest Coalition of Alabama
- History of Baptists in Alabama
- Honda Manufacturing of Alabama
- Iron & Steel Museum of Alabama
- LGBT rights in Alabama
- Libertarian Party of Alabama
- List of Confederate units from Alabama
- List of Alabama Union Civil War regiments
- List of Alabama area codes
- List of Alabama companies
- List of Alabama state symbols
- List of Alabama tornado events
- List of Alabama–Huntsville Chargers men's ice hockey seasons
- List of Carnegie libraries in Alabama
- List of governors of Alabama
- List of United States federal courthouses in Alabama
- List of breweries in Alabama
- List of casinos in Alabama
- List of census county divisions in Alabama
- List of census-designated places in Alabama
- List of cities and towns in Alabama
- List of city nicknames in Alabama
- List of college athletic programs in Alabama
- List of county courthouses in Alabama
- List of covered bridges in Alabama
- List of dams and reservoirs in Alabama
- List of fossiliferous stratigraphic units in Alabama
- List of hiking trails in Alabama
- List of law schools in Alabama
- List of lieutenant governors of Alabama
- List of lighthouses in Alabama
- List of metropolitan areas of Alabama
- List of people executed in Alabama
- List of place names in Alabama of Native American origin
- List of plantations in Alabama
- List of shopping malls in Alabama
- List of television stations in Alabama (by channel number)
- List of television stations in Alabama by city of license
- List of unincorporated communities in Alabama
- Live at the Apollo (Ben Harper and The Blind Boys of Alabama)
- Live in Alabama & More
- Loveman's of Alabama
- My Home's in Alabama
- My Home's in Alabama (song)
- National Democratic Party of Alabama
- National Register of Historic Places Multiple Property Submissions in Alabama
- Paleontology in Alabama
- Poet Laureate of Alabama
- Retirement Systems of Alabama
- Seal of Alabama
- State Auditor of Alabama
- The Blind Boys of Alabama
- Time in Alabama
- Tobacco in Alabama
