= List of Alabama State Hornets in the NFL draft =

Alabama State University began sending draftees into the NFL in 1959. Since then, they have had 21 players drafted.

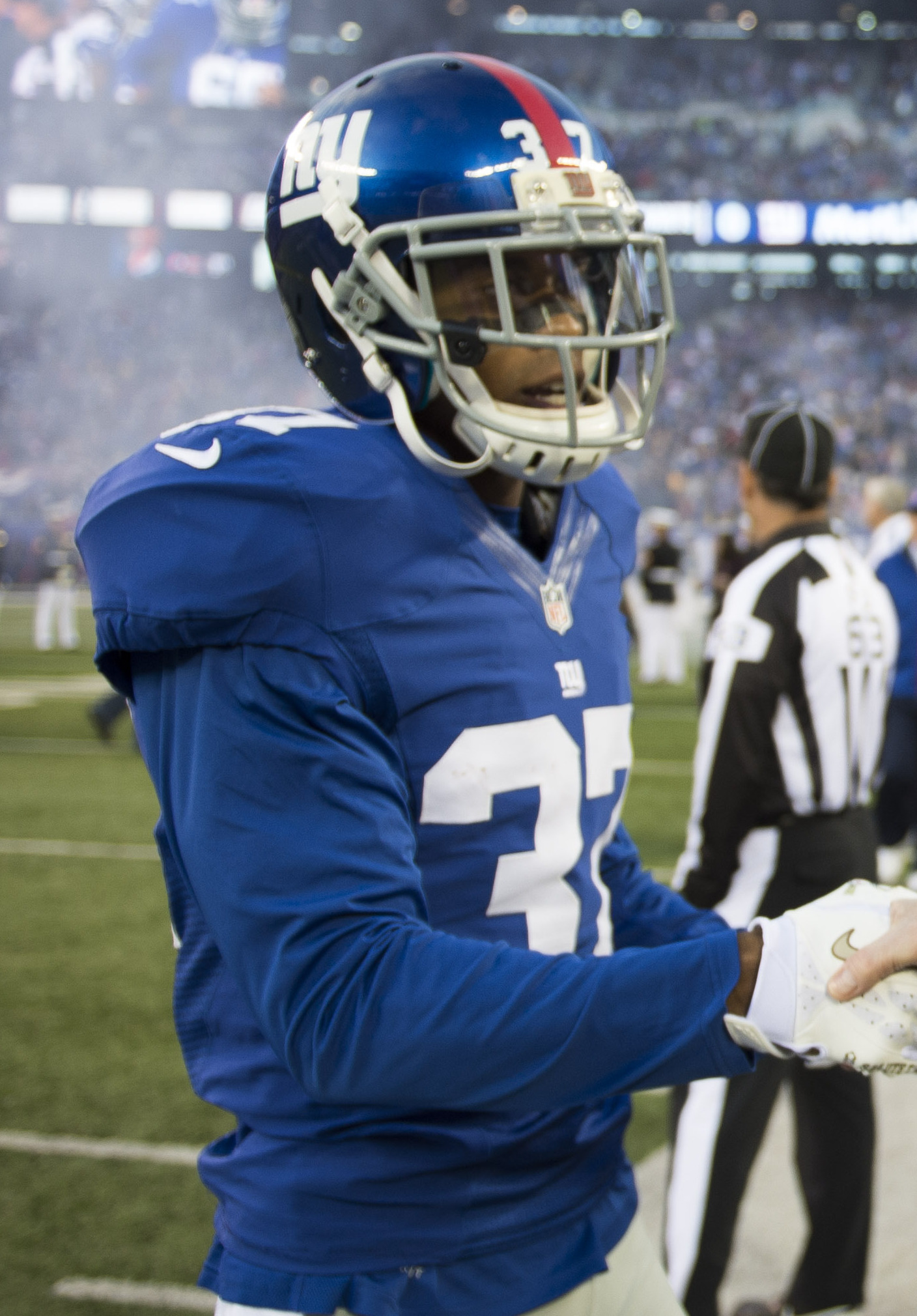
Michael Coe was a member of the New York Giants team that won Super Bowl XLVI.

== Key ==
| B | Back | K | Kicker | NT | Nose tackle |
| C | Center | LB | Linebacker | FB | Fullback |
| DB | Defensive back | P | Punter | HB | Halfback |
| DE | Defensive end | QB | Quarterback | WR | Wide receiver |
| DT | Defensive tackle | RB | Running back | G | Guard |
| E | End | T | Offensive tackle | TE | Tight end |

== Selections ==
| Year | Round | Pick | Player | Team | Position |
|---|---|---|---|---|---|
| 1959 | 29 | 344 | Ernie Moore | Los Angeles Rams | E |
| 1968 | 14 | 378 | Charles Mitchell | Baltimore Colts | TE |
| 1969 | 6 | 155 | John Pleasant | Kansas City Chiefs | RB |
| 1970 | 13 | 322 | Ralph Miller | New Orleans Saints | TE |
| 1972 | 2 | 51 | Lester Sims | Cleveland Browns | DE |
| 1978 | 11 | 295 | Willie Thicklen | Houston Oilers | WR |
| 1980 | 11 | 304 | Terry Greer | Los Angeles Rams | WR |
| 1981 | 2 | 46 | Curtis Green | Detroit Lions | DE |
| 1981 | 6 | 158 | William Daniels | Los Angeles Rams | DT |
| 1982 | 6 | 141 | Ricky Smith | New England Patriots | DB |
| 1983 | 10 | 262 | Thomas Hopkins | Cleveland Browns | T |
| 1983 | 12 | 323 | James Lane | St. Louis Cardinals | LB |
| 1984 | 9 | 230 | Zack Barnes | San Diego Chargers | DT |
| 1985 | 7 | 178 | Karl Powe | Dallas Cowboys | WR |
| 1989 | 11 | 303 | Brad Baxter | Minnesota Vikings | RB |
| 1992 | 2 | 50 | Eddie Robinson | Houston Oilers | LB |
| 1992 | 8 | 198 | Ricky Jones | Los Angeles Rams | QB |
| 1996 | 4 | 110 | Reggie Barlow | Jacksonville Jaguars | WR |
| 2006 | 2 | 64 | Tarvaris Jackson | Minnesota Vikings | QB |
| 2007 | 5 | 173 | Michael Coe | Indianapolis Colts | DB |
| 2017 | 7 | 231 | Jylan Ware | Oakland Raiders | T |
| 2019 | 1 | 23 | Tytus Howard | Houston Texans | T |
