= List of television stations in Alabama by city of license =

This is a list of broadcast television stations serving cities in the state of Alabama.

City	ch	Callsign	Network
Anniston	40	WGWW	Heroes & Icons on 40.1; ABC on 40.2 via WBMA-LD
Bessemer	17	WDBB	The 205 on 17.1; ABC on 17.2 via WBMA-LD
Birmingham	6	WBRC	Fox
Birmingham	10	WBIQ	PBS
Birmingham	13	WVTM-TV	NBC on 13.1 CBS on 13.2
Birmingham	42	WIAT	The CW
Birmingham	68	WABM	MyNetworkTV on 68.1; ABC on 68.2 via WBMA-LD
Demopolis	41	WIIQ	PBS
Dothan	4	WTVY	CBS on 4.1; MyNetworkTV on 4.2; The CW on 4.3; NBC on 4.4 via WRGX
Dothan	18	WDHN	ABC
Dozier	2	WDIQ	PBS
Florence	15	WHDF	The CW
Florence	36	WFIQ	PBS
Gadsden	60	WTJP-TV	TBN
Gulf Shores	55	WFNA	The CW
Homewood	21	WTTO	The CW
Hoover	44	WPXH-TV	ION Television
Huntsville	19	WHNT-TV	CBS
Huntsville	25	WHIQ	PBS
Huntsville	31	WAAY-TV	ABC
Huntsville	48	WAFF	NBC
Huntsville	54	WZDX	Fox on 54.1; MyNetworkTV on 54.2
Louisville	43	WGIQ	PBS
Mobile	5	WKRG-TV	CBS on 5.1; ION Television on 5.2
Mobile	10	WALA-TV	Fox
Mobile	15	WPMI-TV	NBC
Mobile	21	WMPV-TV	TBN
Mobile	42	WEIQ	PBS
Montgomery	12	WSFA	NBC
Montgomery	20	WCOV-TV	Fox
Montgomery	26	WAIQ	PBS
Montgomery	32	WNCF	ABC
Montgomery	45	WMCF-TV	TBN
Mount Cheaha	7	WCIQ	PBS
Opelika	66	WGBP-TV	independent
Ozark	34	WDFX-TV	Fox
Selma	8	WAKA	CBS
Selma	29	WBIH	independent
Troy	67	WIYC	independent
Tuscaloosa	23	WVUA	This TV
Tuscaloosa	33	WSES	Heroes & Icons
Tuskegee	22	WBMM	The CW

== See also ==
- List of television stations in Alabama
- List of television stations in Alabama (by channel number)
