= Solar power in Alabama =

Overview of solar power in the U.S. state of Alabama

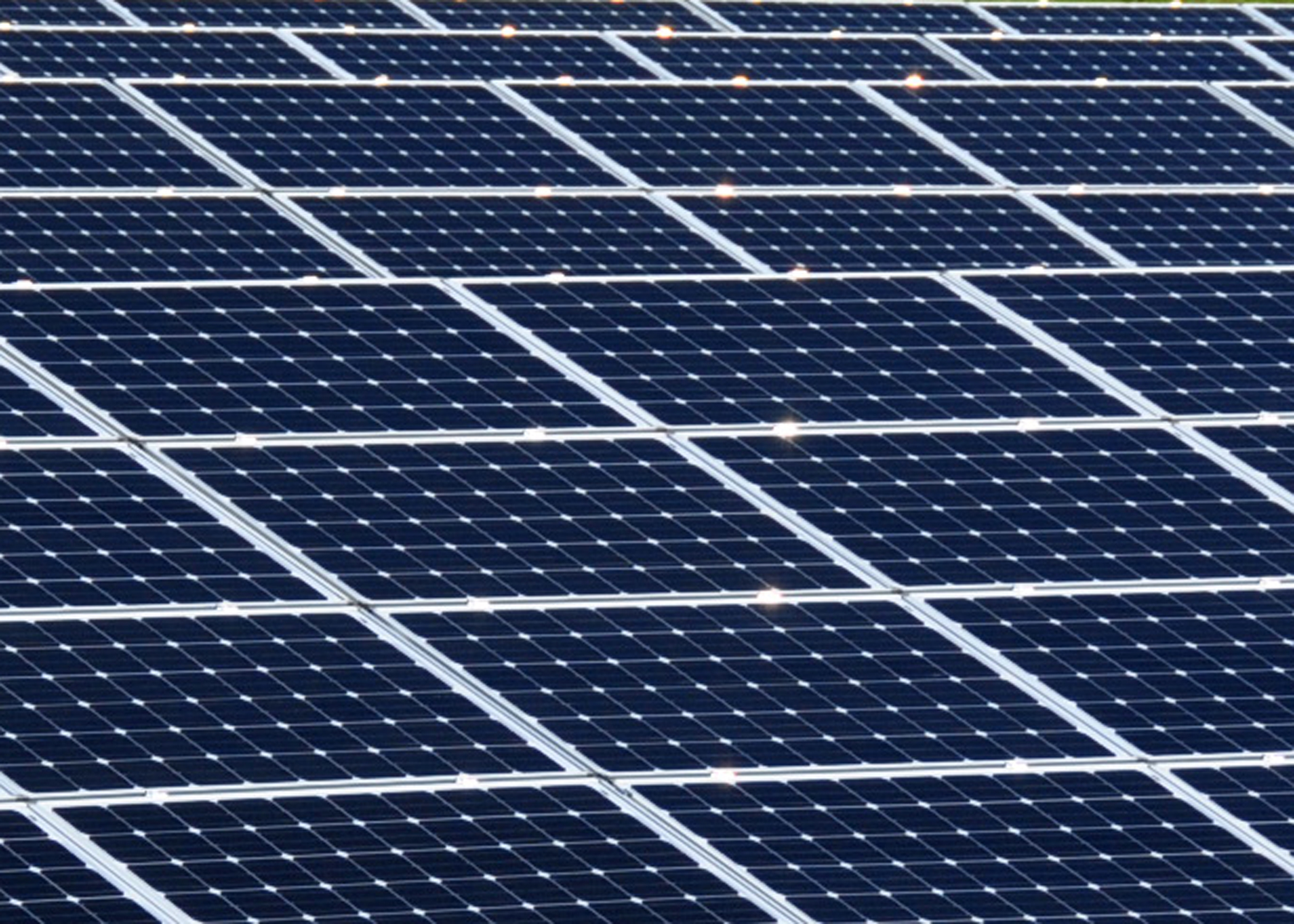
Solar panels

Solar power in Alabama on rooftops could theoretically provide 29.8% of all electricity used in Alabama, with 20,400 MW of solar panels potentially installed on rooftops.

Alabama was ranked 50th among US states for solar power in 2020, and 35th in Q1 of 2021, with .027% of the state's power generated by solar.

== Currently operating (Note: As of December 31, 2025) ==
=== Coastal Plain Region ===
Solar Facilities in Alabama (Coastal Plain Region)
#	Plant Name	Utility Name	County	Capacity (MW)	Operating Year
1	Black Bear Solar 1	Lightsource Renewable Energy Asset Management, LLC	Montgomery	100.0	2023
2	East Atmore Solar	East Atmore Solar, LLC	Escambia	80.0	2025
3	Fort Benning Solar Facility	Georgia Power Co	Russell	30.0	2015
4	Fort Rucker Solar Array	Alabama Power Co	Dale	10.6	2017
5	Wing	Origis Energy USA, Inc	Covington	80.0	2023

=== Cumberland Plateau ===
There are currently no operable utility-scale solar facilities located in counties within Alabama's Cumberland Plateau (Appalachian Plateau) region.

=== Highland Rim / Tennessee Valley Region ===
Solar Facilities in Alabama (Highland Rim / Tennessee Valley Region)
#	Plant Name	Utility Name	County	Capacity (MW)	Operating Year
1	Cumblerland Land Holdings, LLC	Cumberland Land Holdings, LLC	Limestone	14.7	2018
2	Muscle Shoals	Muscle Shoals Solar, LLC	Colbert	227.0	2021
3	Redstone Arsenal Hybrid	MN8 Energy LLC	Madison	10.0	2017
4	River Bend Solar, LLC (AL)	River Bend Solar, LLC	Lauderdale	75.0	2016
5	TAI Huntsville Solar Hybrid	TAI Huntsville Solar, LLC	Madison	32.4	2024

=== Piedmont Region ===
Solar Facilities in Alabama (Piedmont Region)
#	Plant Name	Utility Name	County	Capacity (MW)	Operating Year
1	LaFayette Solar Farm	Boralex US Operations LLC	Chambers	79.2	2017

=== Ridge and Valley Region ===
Solar Facilities in Alabama (Ridge and Valley Region)
#	Plant Name	Utility Name	County	Capacity (MW)	Operating Year
1	ANAD Solar Array	Alabama Power Co	Calhoun	7.4	2017

== Net metering ==
Offering net metering is required by federal law, but Alabama is one of only four states to not have adopted a statewide policy on net metering, which means it needs to be negotiated with the utility. IREC best practices, based on experience, recommends no limits to net metering, individual or aggregate, and perpetual roll over of kWh credits.

Alabama Power has installed four types of solar panels in Birmingham that can be monitored on the Internet. The company will pay up to 4.81¢/kWh during the summer and 3.93¢/kWh in the winter for excess generation from up to 100 kW systems. Peak power rates are weekdays, 1 to 7 pm in summer and 5 to 9 am in winter. Customers choosing the Time Advantage Energy rate pay 7¢/kWh during winter peak periods and 25¢/kWh during summer peak periods. Off-peak is charged 5¢/kWh. Using time advantage requires a time of use meter, and the base charge is increased by $10.50 each month.

== Solar power projects ==
In 2010, one of Alabama's largest solar arrays was the 25 kW system installed at the Coastal Response Center, in Coden, Alabama. A $250,000 economic stimulus grant was used to install 156 solar panels on Anniston's Museum of Natural History, which was completed on August 24, 2011. The output of this 25.2 kW system can also be monitored online.

River Bend Solar, completed in 2016, contributes 75 MW capacity to the TVA power grid, and reduces carbon emissions by 100,000 tons annually.

LaFayette Solar Farm in LaFayette, completed in 2019, supplies 79.2 MW to Walmart.

In 2021, Covington Electric Cooperative, which is constructing a 100 kW solar array, was the only rural electric cooperative in Alabama with a community solar program.

== Solar panel manufacturing ==
In 2019, LG Electronics opened a solar panel manufacturing plant in Huntsville.

== Statistics ==
Source: NREL

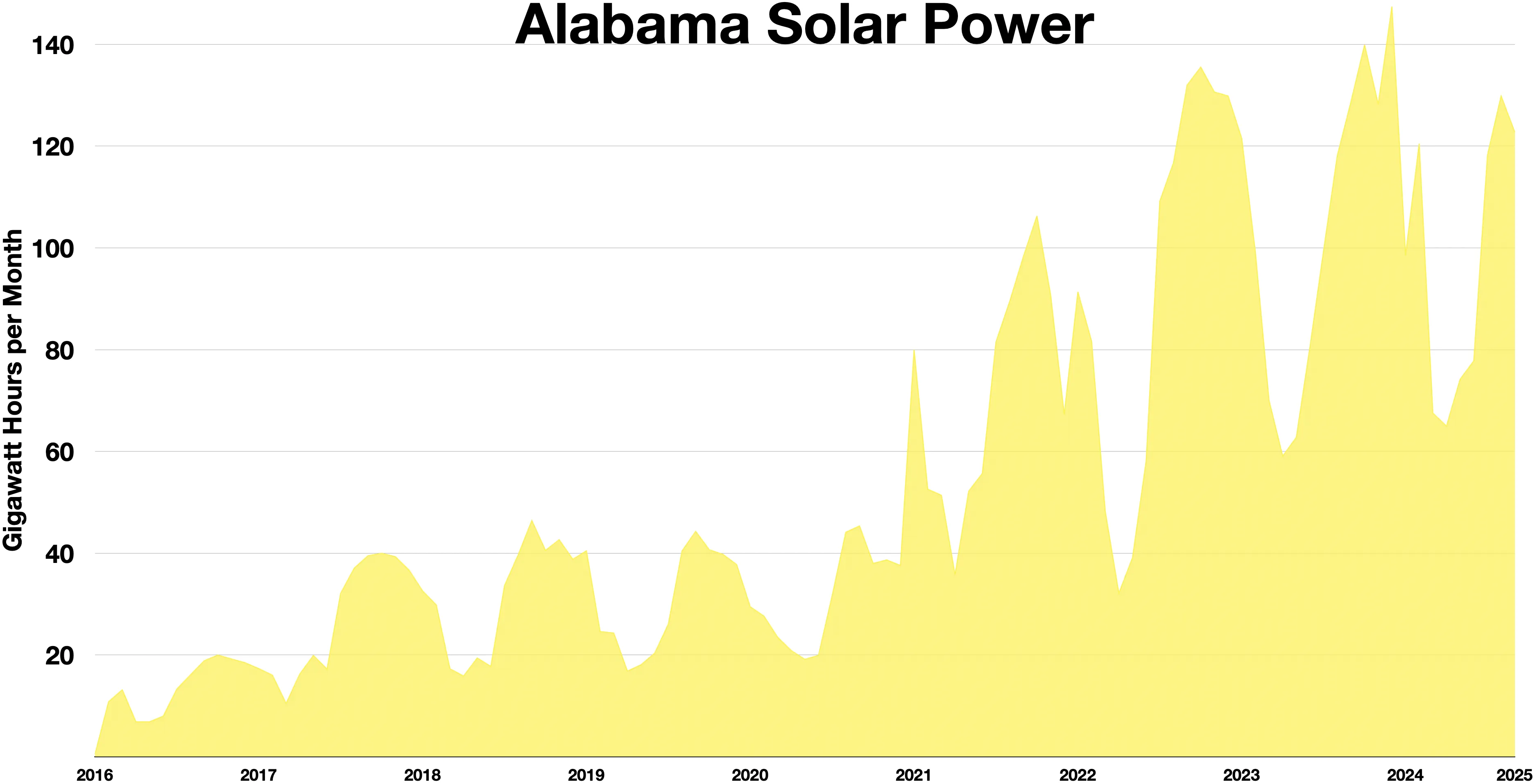
Alabama Solar Power from 2016 to 2025

Grid-connected PV capacity (MWp)
Year	Capacity	Installed	% change
2009	0.2	0.1	100%
2010	0.4	0.2	100%
2011	0.5	0.1	20%
2012	1.1	0.6	120%
2013	1.9	0.8	73%
2014	1.9	0	0%
2015	2	0.1	5%
2016	105	103	5,150%
2017	215	110	105%
2018	263	48	22%
2019	283	20	7.6%
2020	283.1	0.1	0.03%
2021	577.9	294.8	%
2022	578	0.1	%

Utility-scale solar generation in Alabama (GWh)
Year	Total	Jan	Feb	Mar	Apr	May	Jun	Jul	Aug	Sep	Oct	Nov	Dec
2016	41	0	0	0	0	0	0	0	0	0	11	13	7
2017	179	7	8	13	16	19	20	19	18	17	16	10	16
2018	357	20	17	32	37	39	40	39	37	33	30	17	16
2019	386	19	18	34	40	46	41	43	39	40	25	24	17
2020	371	18	21	26	40	44	41	41	38	30	28	23	21
2021	276	19	20	32	44	46	38	39	38				

== See also ==
- Solar power in the United States
- Renewable energy in the United States
