= University of North Alabama President's Home =

Coordinates: 34.807°N 87.678°W

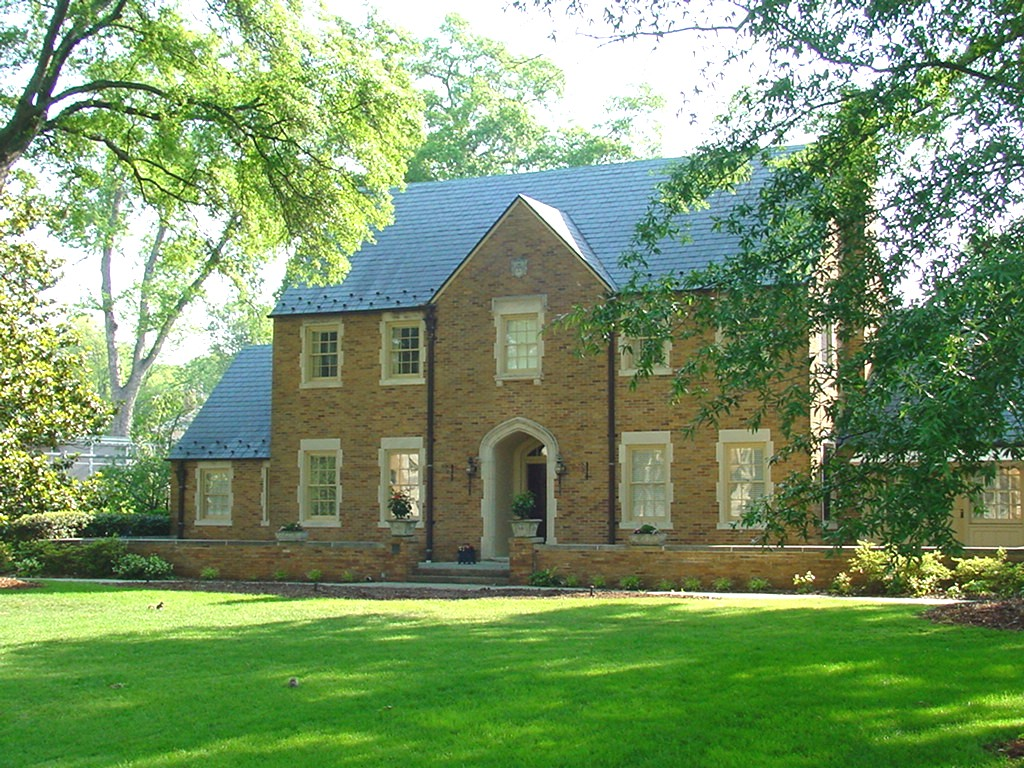
The President's Homes serves as the official residence of the president of the University of North Alabama. The residence was first occupied by President James Albert Keller in 1941.

The President's Home at the University of North Alabama serves as the official residence of the university president.

Constructed by the Works Projects Administration and completed in 1940, the residence is currently occupied by President Kenneth D. Kitts and his spouse.

== History ==
Plans for the home were drawn by Warren, Knight, and Davis Architects of Birmingham, Alabama in May, 1939. The home was completed in January, 1940.

Patterned after English and American Colonial structures, the residence is located on the historic site of the James Sample Brickyard, one of the earliest industries established in Florence, Alabama, which was founded in 1818. Most of the bricks used in the construction of Florence's oldest homes were manufactured at this site.

The residence was first occupied by James Albert Keller, president of what was then known as Florence State Teachers College, followed by Ethelbert Brinkley "E.B." Norton in 1948, and by Robert M. Guillot in 1972.

Following Guillot's departure in 1990, the home served as a guest house for President Robert Potts and as a center for official presidential functions.

Under the supervision of presidential assistant Brenda Baker and Trustee Emeritus Brenda Morrow, the residence underwent a complete refurbishing beginning in December, 2004, shortly before the arrival of President and Mrs. Cale. Furnishing was provided by local retail outlets in the Shoals area.

The parlor renovation was undertaken by Story and Lee Furniture of Leoma, Tennessee. Karla Weathers, the company's interior designer, assisted with the redesign of much of the rest of the main floor.

More recently, B.J. Cale, a master gardener, also has worked closely with grounds personnel to supervise enhancement of the lawn and garden.

The residence is located next to the George H. Carroll Lion Habitat, home of Leo III and Una, the university's live lion mascots. Overnight guests often are awakened by the lions' roaring.
