= Demographics of Alabama =

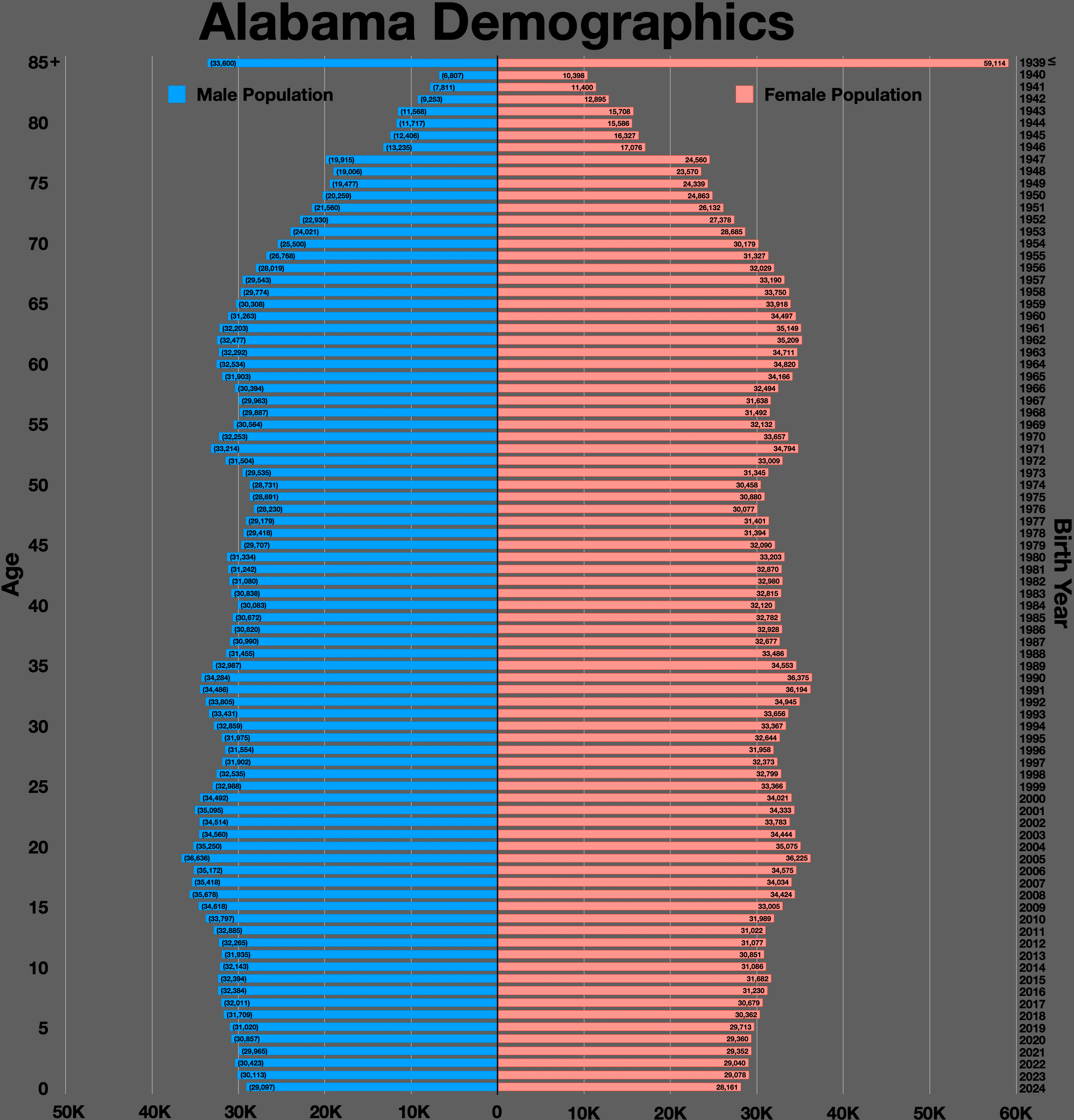
Alabama population pyramid

The 2010 census estimated Alabama's population at 4,802,740, an increase of 332,636 or 7.5% since 2000. This includes a natural increase of 87,818 (375,808 births minus 287,990 deaths) and a net migration of 73,178 people into the state. Immigration from outside the United States resulted in a net increase of 30,537 and migration within the country produced a net increase of 42,641.

As of 2000, 96.7% of Alabama residents age 5 and older speak English at home and 2.2% speak Spanish. German speakers make up only 0.4% of the population, French/French Creole at 0.3%, and Chinese at 0.1%.

In 2006 Alabama had a larger percentage of tobacco smokers than the national average, with 23% of adults smoking.

The religious affiliations of adult people in Alabama are as follows: Christian – 86%, Non-Christian Faiths – 1%, Other faiths – 1%, Unaffiliated (religious "nones") – 12%

As of 2000, 25.3% of residents of the state were under 18, 6.7% were under 5, and 13.0% were over 65.

51.7% of Alabamians are female and 48.3% are male.

== Vital statistics ==
Year	Population	Live births	Deaths	Natural change	Crude birth rate (per 1,000)	Crude death rate (per 1,000)	Natural change (per 1,000)	Crude migration change (per 1,000)
2000	4,452,173	63,299	45,062	18,237	14.2	10.1	4.1	
2001	4,467,634	60,454	45,316	15,138	13.5	10.1	3.4	0.1
2002	4,480,089	58,967	46,069	12,898	13.2	10.3	2.9	-0.1
2003	4,503,491	59,552	46,716	12,836	13.2	10.4	2.8	2.3
2004	4,530,729	59,510	46,121	13,389	13.1	10.2	2.9	3.1
2005	4,569,805	60,453	47,090	13,363	13.2	10.3	2.9	5.6
2006	4,628,981	63,232	46,977	16,255	13.7	10.1	3.6	9.3
2007	4,672,840	64,804	46,696	18,108	13.9	10.0	3.9	5.5
2008	4,718,206	64,546	47,707	16,839	13.7	10.1	3.6	6.0
2009	4,757,938	62,475	47,470	15,005	13.1	10.0	3.1	5.2
2010	4,788,095	60,050	48,038	12,012	12.5	10.0	2.5	3.8
2011	4,812,576	59,354	48,681	10,673	12.3	10.1	2.2	2.9
2012	4,839,947	58,448	49,301	9,147	12.1	10.2	1.9	3.8
2013	4,865,253	58,167	50,189	7,978	12.0	10.3	1.7	3.6
2014	4,887,757	59,422	50,215	9,207	12.2	10.3	1.9	2.7
2015	4,909,177	59,657	51,909	7,748	12.2	10.6	1.6	2.8
2016	4,931,579	59,151	52,466	6,685	12.0	10.6	1.4	3.2
2017	4,953,096	58,941	53,238	5,703	11.9	10.7	1.2	3.2
2018	4,977,088	57,761	54,352	3,409	11.6	10.9	0.7	4.1
2019	5,003,778	58,615	54,108	4,507	11.7	10.8	0.9	4.4
2020	5,032,962	57,647	64,779	-7,132	11.5	12.9	-1.4	7.2
2021	5,050,058	58,054	68,889	-10,835	11.5	13.6	-2.1	5.5
2022	5,076,868	58,149	62,294	-4,145	11.5	12.3	-0.8	6.1
2023	5,117,850	57,858	59,237	-1,379	11.3	11.6	-0.3	8.3
2024	5,163,055	57,934	58,885	-951	11.2	11.4	-0.2	8.9
2025	5,193,088	57,138	59,934	-2,796	11.0	11.5	-0.5	6.3

Historical population
Year	Pop.	±%
1800	1,250	—
1810	9,046	+623.7%
1820	144,317	+1495.4%
1830	309,527	+114.5%
1840	590,756	+90.9%
1850	771,623	+30.6%
1860	964,201	+25.0%
1870	996,992	+3.4%
1880	1,262,505	+26.6%
1890	1,513,401	+19.9%
1900	1,828,697	+20.8%
1910	2,138,093	+16.9%
1920	2,348,174	+9.8%
1930	2,646,248	+12.7%
1940	2,832,961	+7.1%
1950	3,061,743	+8.1%
1960	3,266,740	+6.7%
1970	3,444,165	+5.4%
1980	3,893,888	+13.1%
1990	4,040,587	+3.8%
2000	4,447,100	+10.1%
2010	4,779,736	+7.5%
2020	5,024,279	+5.1%
2025 (est.)	5,193,088	+3.4%
Sources: 1820, 1910–2020, 2025

== Population ==
The 2010 census estimated Alabama's population at 4,802,740, an increase of 332,636 or 7.5% since 2000. This includes a natural increase of 87,818 (375,808 births minus 287,990 deaths) and a net migration of 73,178 people into the state. Immigration from outside the United States resulted in a net increase of 30,537 and migration within the country produced a net increase of 42,641.

In 2006 Alabama had a larger percentage of tobacco smokers than the national average, with 23% of adults smoking.

=== Racial and ethnic composition ===
Alabama – Racial and ethnic composition Note: the US Census treats Hispanic/Latino as an ethnic category. This table excludes Latinos from the racial categories and assigns them to a separate category. Hispanics/Latinos may be of any race.
Race / Ethnicity (NH = Non-Hispanic)	Pop 1980	Pop 1990	Pop 2000	Pop 2010	Pop 2020	% 1980	% 1990	% 2000	% 2010	% 2020
White alone (NH)	2,855,558	2,960,167	3,125,819	3,204,402	3,171,351	73.33%	73.26%	70.29%	67.04%	63.12%
Black or African American alone (NH)	983,696	1,017,713	1,150,076	1,244,437	1,288,159	25.26%	25.19%	25.86%	26.04%	25.64%
Native American or Alaska Native alone (NH)	7,583	16,221	21,618	25,907	23,119	0.19%	0.40%	0.49%	0.54%	0.46%
Asian alone (NH)	9,726	21,217	30,989	52,937	75,918	0.25%	0.53%	0.70%	1.11%	1.51%
Native Hawaiian or Pacific Islander alone (NH)	x	x	1,059	1,976	2,612	x	x	0.02%	0.04%	0.05%
Other race alone (NH)	4,026	640	2,623	4,030	14,455	0.10%	0.02%	0.06%	0.08%	0.29%
Mixed race or Multiracial (NH)	x	x	39,086	60,445	184,618	x	x	0.88%	1.26%	3.67%
Hispanic or Latino (any race)	33,299	24,629	75,830	185,602	264,047	0.86%	0.61%	1.71%	3.88%	5.26%
Total	3,893,888	4,040,587	4,447,100	4,779,736	5,024,279	100.00%	100.00%	100.00%	100.00%	100.00%

==== 2025 American Community Survey one-year estimates ====
Racial Makeup of Alabama (2025): 1. White alone (63.1%); 2. Black alone (25.1%); 3. Native American alone (0.52%); 4. Asian Alone (1.75%); 5. Pacific Islander Alone (0.09%); 6. Other race alone (2.49%); 7. Two or more races (6.97%)	Racial/Ethnic Makeup of Alabama excluding Hispanics from racial categories (2025); NH=Non-Hispanic: 1. White NH (61.8%); 2. Black NH (24.9%); 3. Native American NH (0.33%); 4. Asian NH (1.69%); 5. Pacific Islander NH (0.04%); 6. Other race NH (0.35%); 7. Two or more races NH (4.50%); 8. Hispanic Any Race (6.37%)	Racial Makeup of Hispanics in Alabama (2025): 1. White alone (20.2%); 2. Black alone (2.81%); 3. Native American alone (2.98%); 4. Asian Alone (0.91%); 5. Pacific Islander Alone (0.75%); 6. Other race alone (33.6%); 7. Two or more races (38.8%)

==== Race and ethnicity by county ====
Autauga County racial composition
Race	Num.	Perc.
White (non-Hispanic)	41,582	70.71%
Black or African American (non-Hispanic)	11,352	19.3%
Native American	184	0.31%
Asian	873	1.48%
Pacific Islander	22	0.04%
Other/Mixed	2,675	4.55%
Hispanic or Latino	2,117	3.6%

Baldwin County racial composition
Race	Num.	Perc.
White (non-Hispanic)	186,495	80.47%
Black or African American (non-Hispanic)	18,001	7.77%
Native American	1,291	0.56%
Asian	2,029	0.88%
Pacific Islander	122	0.05%
Other/Mixed	11,143	4.81%
Hispanic or Latino	12,686	5.47%

Barbour County racial composition
Race	Num.	Perc.
White (non-Hispanic)	11,086	43.95%
Black or African American (non-Hispanic)	11,850	46.98%
Native American	58	0.23%
Asian	103	0.41%
Other/Mixed	616	2.44%
Hispanic or Latino	1,510	5.99%

Bibb County racial composition
Race	Num.	Perc.
White (non-Hispanic)	16,442	73.75%
Black or African American (non-Hispanic)	4,390	19.69%
Native American	39	0.17%
Asian	26	0.12%
Pacific Islander	9	0.04%
Other/Mixed	647	2.9%
Hispanic or Latino	740	3.32%

Blount County racial composition
Race	Num.	Perc.
White (non-Hispanic)	49,764	84.15%
Black or African American (non-Hispanic)	826	1.4%
Native American	188	0.32%
Asian	174	0.29%
Pacific Islander	11	0.02%
Other/Mixed	2,400	4.06%
Hispanic or Latino	5,771	9.76%

Bullock County racial composition
Race	Num.	Perc.
White (non-Hispanic)	2,281	22.02%
Black or African American (non-Hispanic)	7,388	71.33%
Native American	1	0.01%
Asian	9	0.09%
Pacific Islander	7	0.07%
Other/Mixed	168	1.62%
Hispanic or Latino	503	4.86%

Butler County Racial Composition
Race	Num.	Perc.
White (non-Hispanic)	9,679	50.81%
Black or African American (non-Hispanic)	8,389	44.03%
Native American	23	0.12%
Asian	143	0.75%
Pacific Islander	5	0.03%
Other/Mixed	552	2.9%
Hispanic or Latino	250	1.36%

Calhoun County racial composition
Race	Num.	Perc.
White (non-Hispanic)	79,519	68.29%
Black or African American (non-Hispanic)	25,365	21.78%
Native American	386	0.33%
Asian	1,164	1.0%
Pacific Islander	112	0.1%
Other/Mixed	4,885	4.2%
Hispanic or Latino	5,010	4.3%

Chambers County racial composition
Race	Num.	Perc.
White (non-Hispanic)	18,616	53.54%
Black or African American (non-Hispanic)	13,441	38.65%
Native American	71	0.2%
Asian	385	1.11%
Pacific Islander	11	0.03%
Other/Mixed	1,011	2.91%
Hispanic or Latino	1,237	3.56%

Cherokee County racial composition
Race	Num.	Perc.
White (non-Hispanic)	22,563	90.36%
Black or African American (non-Hispanic)	987	3.95%
Native American	109	0.44%
Asian	55	0.22%
Pacific Islander	1	0.0%
Other/Mixed	856	3.43%
Hispanic or Latino	400	1.6%

Chilton County racial composition
Race	Num.	Perc.
White (non-Hispanic)	34,878	77.48%
Black or African American (non-Hispanic)	4,040	8.97%
Native American	112	0.25%
Asian	176	0.39%
Pacific Islander	5	0.01%
Other/Mixed	1,385	3.08%
Hispanic or Latino	4,418	9.81%

Choctaw County Racial Composition
Race	Num.	Perc.
White (non-Hispanic)	7,039	55.58%
Black or African American (non-Hispanic)	5,217	41.19%
Native American	24	0.19
Asian	19	0.15%
Other/Mixed	253	2.0%
Hispanic or Latino	113	0.89%

Clarke County Racial Composition
Race	Num.	Perc.
White (non-Hispanic)	11,970	51.85%
Black or African American (non-Hispanic)	10,223	44.28%
Native American	74	0.32%
Asian	91	0.39%
Pacific Islander	1	0.0%
Other/Mixed	522	2.26%
Hispanic or Latino	206	0.89%

Clay County racial composition
Race	Num.	Perc.
White (non-Hispanic)	11,261	79.1%
Black or African American (non-Hispanic)	1,942	13.64%
Native American	45	0.32%
Asian	46	0.32%
Pacific Islander	4	0.03%
Other/Mixed	489	3.43%
Hispanic or Latino	449	3.15%

Cleburne County racial composition
Race	Num.	Perc.
White (non-Hispanic)	13,740	91.26%
Black or African American (non-Hispanic)	457	3.04%
Native American	42	0.28%
Asian	21	0.14%
Pacific Islander	2	0.01%
Other/Mixed	510	3.39%
Hispanic or Latino	284	1.89%

Coffee County racial composition
Race	Num.	Perc.
White (non-Hispanic)	35,759	66.88%
Black or African American (non-Hispanic)	8,643	16.17%
Native American	405	0.76%
Asian	892	1.67%
Pacific Islander	57	0.11%
Other/Mixed	2,822	5.28%
Hispanic or Latino	4,887	9.14%

Colbert County racial composition
Race	Num.	Perc.
White (non-Hispanic)	43,241	75.56%
Black or African American (non-Hispanic)	9,222	16.11%
Native American	223	0.39%
Asian	432	0.75%
Pacific Islander	9	0.02%
Other/Mixed	2,368	4.14%
Hispanic or Latino	1,732	3.03%

Conecuh County Racial Composition
Race	Num.	Perc.
White (non-Hispanic)	5,835	50.31%
Black or African American (non-Hispanic)	5,096	43.94%
Native American	71	0.61%
Asian	33	0.28%
Other/Mixed	306	2.64%
Hispanic or Latino	256	2.21%

Coosa County racial composition
Race	Num.	Perc.
White (non-Hispanic)	6,807	65.53%
Black or African American (non-Hispanic)	3,000	28.88%
Native American	25	0.24%
Asian	8	0.08%
Other/Mixed	346	3.33%
Hispanic or Latino	201	1.94%

Covington County racial composition
Race	Num.	Perc.
White (non-Hispanic)	30,657	81.6%
Black or African American (non-Hispanic)	4,563	12.15%
Native American	140	0.37%
Asian	240	0.64%
Other/Mixed	1,316	3.5%
Hispanic or Latino	654	1.74%

Crenshaw County racial composition
Race	Num.	Perc.
White (non-Hispanic)	9,333	70.74%
Black or African American (non-Hispanic)	3,085	23.38%
Native American	48	0.36%
Asian	83	0.63%
Pacific Islander	2	0.02%
Other/Mixed	456	3.46%
Hispanic or Latino	187	1.42%

Cullman County racial composition
Race	Num.	Perc.
White (non-Hispanic)	78,298	89.11%
Black or African American (non-Hispanic)	914	1.04%
Native American	287	0.33%
Asian	522	0.59%
Pacific Islander	64	0.07%
Other/Mixed	3,635	4.14%
Hispanic or Latino	4,146	4.72%

Dale County racial composition
Race	Num.	Perc.
White (non-Hispanic)	32,602	66.09%
Black or African American (non-Hispanic)	10,100	20.48%
Native American	217	0.44%
Asian	648	1.31%
Pacific Islander	42	0.09%
Other/Mixed	2,463	4.99%
Hispanic or Latino	3,254	6.6%

Dallas County Racial Composition
Race	Num.	Perc.
White (non-Hispanic)	10,363	26.94%
Black or African American (non-Hispanic)	26,812	69.71%
Native American	56	0.15%
Asian	145	0.38%
Pacific Islander	12	0.03%
Other/Mixed	778	2.02%
Hispanic or Latino	296	0.77%

DeKalb County racial composition
Race	Num.	Perc.
White (non-Hispanic)	54,529	76.15%
Black or African American (non-Hispanic)	1,019	1.42%
Native American	715	1.0%
Asian	237	0.33%
Pacific Islander	16	0.02%
Other/Mixed	3,348	4.68%
Hispanic or Latino	11,744	16.4%

Elmore County racial composition
Race	Num.	Perc.
White (non-Hispanic)	62,540	71.09%
Black or African American (non-Hispanic)	18,126	20.6%
Native American	270	0.31%
Asian	669	0.76%
Pacific Islander	28	0.03%
Other/Mixed	3,551	4.04%
Hispanic or Latino	2,793	3.17%

Escambia County racial composition
Race	Num.	Perc.
White (non-Hispanic)	22,004	59.86%
Black or African American (non-Hispanic)	10,922	29.71%
Native American	1,488	4.05%
Asian	108	0.29%
Pacific Islander	22	0.06%
Other/Mixed	1,462	3.98%
Hispanic or Latino	751	2.04%

Etowah County racial composition
Race	Num.	Perc.
White (non-Hispanic)	77,731	75.15%
Black or African American (non-Hispanic)	14,999	14.5%
Native American	332	0.32%
Asian	921	0.89%
Pacific Islander	39	0.04%
Other/Mixed	4,519	4.37%
Hispanic or Latino	4,895	4.73%

Fayette County racial composition
Race	Num.	Perc.
White (non-Hispanic)	13,552	83.03%
Black or African American (non-Hispanic)	1,720	10.54%
Native American	43	0.26%
Asian	49	0.3%
Pacific Islander	1	0.01%
Other/Mixed	560	3.43%
Hispanic or Latino	396	2.43%

Franklin County racial composition
Race	Num.	Perc.
White (non-Hispanic)	23,581	73.43%
Black or African American (non-Hispanic)	1,139	3.55%
Native American	128	0.4%
Asian	67	0.21%
Pacific Islander	2	0.01%
Other/Mixed	937	2.92%
Hispanic or Latino	6,259	19.49%

Geneva County racial composition
Race	Num.	Perc.
White (non-Hispanic)	21,654	81.23%
Black or African American (non-Hispanic)	2,231	8.37%
Native American	166	0.62%
Asian	86	0.32%
Pacific Islander	7	0.03%
Other/Mixed	1,219	4.57%
Hispanic or Latino	1,296	4.86%

Greene County racial composition
Race	Num.	Perc.
White (non-Hispanic)	1,285	16.62%
Black or African American (non-Hispanic)	6,227	80.56%
Native American	5	0.06%
Asian	7	0.09%
Other/Mixed	145	1.88%
Hispanic or Latino	61	0.79%

Hale County racial composition
Race	Num.	Perc.
White (non-Hispanic)	5,972	40.39%
Black or African American (non-Hispanic)	8,313	56.23%
Native American	34	0.23%
Asian	18	0.12%
Pacific Islander	5	0.03%
Other/Mixed	294	1.99%
Hispanic or Latino	149	1.01%

Henry County racial composition
Race	Num.	Perc.
White (non-Hispanic)	11,842	69.07%
Black or African American (non-Hispanic)	4,232	24.68%
Native American	50	0.29%
Asian	73	0.43%
Other/Mixed	615	3.59%
Hispanic or Latino	334	1.95%

Houston County racial composition
Race	Num.	Perc.
White (non-Hispanic)	68,251	63.67%
Black or African American (non-Hispanic)	28,232	26.34%
Native American	321	0.3%
Asian	1,260	1.18%
Pacific Islander	59	0.06%
Other/Mixed	4,598	4.29%
Hispanic or Latino	4,481	4.18%

Jackson County racial composition
Race	Num.	Perc.
White (non-Hispanic)	45,123	85.82%
Black or African American (non-Hispanic)	1,624	3.09%
Native American	680	1.29%
Asian	214	0.41%
Pacific Islander	2	0.0%
Other/Mixed	3,255	6.19%
Hispanic or Latino	1,681	3.2%

Jefferson County racial composition
Race	Num.	Perc.
White (non-Hispanic)	324,252	48.06%
Black or African American (non-Hispanic)	280,112	41.52%
Native American	1,207	0.18%
Asian	13,043	1.95%
Pacific Islander	311	0.05%
Other/Mixed	20,940	3.1%
Hispanic or Latino	34,856	5.17%

Lamar County racial composition
Race	Num.	Perc.
White (non-Hispanic)	11,924	85.34%
Black or African American (non-Hispanic)	1,421	10.17%
Native American	28	0.2%
Asian	6	0.04%
Pacific Islander	2	0.03%
Other/Mixed	382	2.73%
Hispanic or Latino	208	1.49%

Lauderdale County Racial Composition
Race	Num.	Perc.
White (non-Hispanic)	76,491	81.75%
Black or African American (non-Hispanic)	9,164	9.79%
Native American	295	0.32%
Asian	748	0.8%
Pacific Islander	31	0.03%
Other/Mixed	3,757	4.02%
Hispanic or Latino	3,078	3.29%

Lawrence County racial composition
Race	Num.	Perc.
White (non-Hispanic)	24,714	74.73%
Black or African American (non-Hispanic)	3,302	9.98%
Native American	1,440	4.35%
Asian	84	0.25%
Pacific Islander	7	0.02%
Other/Mixed	2,631	7.96%
Hispanic or Latino	895	2.71%

Lee County racial composition
Race	Num.	Perc.
White (non-Hispanic)	109,795	63.01%
Black or African American (non-Hispanic)	39,252	22.53%
Native American	365	0.21%
Asian	8,544	4.9%
Pacific Islander	108	0.06%
Other/Mixed	7,042	4.04%
Hispanic or Latino	9,135	5.24%

Limestone County racial composition
Race	Num.	Perc.
White (non-Hispanic)	75,692	73.08%
Black or African American (non-Hispanic)	13,177	12.72%
Native American	458	0.44%
Asian	1,857	1.79%
Pacific Islander	70	0.07%
Other/Mixed	5,068	4.89%
Hispanic or Latino	7,248	7.0%

Lowndes County Racial Composition
Race	Num.	Perc.
White (non-Hispanic)	2,807	27.22%
Black or African American (non-Hispanic)	7,149	69.33%
Native American	9	0.09%
Asian	15	0.15%
Other/Mixed	191	1.85%
Hispanic or Latino	140	1.36%

Macon County Racial Composition
Race	Num.	Perc.
White (non-Hispanic)	3,187	16.32%
Black or African American (non-Hispanic)	15,395	78.82%
Native American	48	0.25%
Asian	74	0.38%
Pacific Islander	4	0.02%
Other/Mixed	463	2.37%
Hispanic or Latino	361	1.85%

Madison County racial composition
Race	Num.	Perc.
White (non-Hispanic)	237,497	61.19%
Black or African American (non-Hispanic)	91,079	23.46%
Native American	2,132	0.55%
Asian	10,179	2.62%
Pacific Islander	450	0.12%
Other/Mixed	21,880	5.64%
Hispanic or Latino	24,936	6.42%

Marengo County Racial Composition
Race	Num.	Perc.
White (non-Hispanic)	8,375	43.34%
Black or African American (non-Hispanic)	10,133	52.44%
Native American	6	0.03%
Asian	54	0.28%
Pacific Islander	1	0.01%
Other/Mixed	386	2.0%
Hispanic or Latino	368	1.9%

Marion County racial composition
Race	Num.	Perc.
White (non-Hispanic)	26,093	88.93%
Black or African American (non-Hispanic)	1,094	3.73%
Native American	82	0.28%
Asian	75	0.26%
Pacific Islander	14	0.05%
Other/Mixed	1,120	3.82%
Hispanic or Latino	863	2.94%

Marshall County racial composition
Race	Num.	Perc.
White (non-Hispanic)	74,666	76.49%
Black or African American (non-Hispanic)	2,293	2.35%
Native American	418	0.43%
Asian	579	0.59%
Pacific Islander	128	0.13%
Other/Mixed	3,870	3.96%
Hispanic or Latino	15,658	16.04%

Mobile County racial composition
Race	Num.	Perc.
White (non-Hispanic)	226,703	54.65%
Black or African American (non-Hispanic)	145,435	35.06%
Native American	3,743	0.9%
Asian	8,515	2.05%
Pacific Islander	216	0.05%
Other/Mixed	16,772	4.04%
Hispanic or Latino	13,425	3.24%

Monroe County Racial Composition
Race	Num.	Perc.
White (non-Hispanic)	10,334	52.27%
Black or African American (non-Hispanic)	8,253	41.74%
Native American	281	1.42%
Asian	88	0.45%
Other/Mixed	609	3.08%
Hispanic or Latino	207	1.05%

Montgomery County racial composition
Race	Num.	Perc.
White (non-Hispanic)	73,354	32.04%
Black or African American (non-Hispanic)	129,801	56.69%
Native American	364	0.16%
Asian	7,952	3.47%
Pacific Islander	119	0.05%
Other/Mixed	6,680	2.92%
Hispanic or Latino	10,684	4.67%

Morgan County racial composition
Race	Num.	Perc.
White (non-Hispanic)	88,238	71.49%
Black or African American (non-Hispanic)	15,307	12.4%
Native American	631	0.51%
Asian	829	0.67%
Pacific Islander	79	0.06%
Other/Mixed	5,960	4.83%
Hispanic or Latino	12,377	10.03%

Perry County racial composition
Race	Num.	Perc.
White (non-Hispanic)	2,345	27.55%
Black or African American (non-Hispanic)	5,914	69.49%
Native American	15	0.18%
Asian	10	0.12%
Pacific Islander	1	0.01%
Other/Mixed	137	1.61%
Hispanic or Latino	89	1.05%

Pickens County racial composition
Race	Num.	Perc.
White (non-Hispanic)	10,066	52.64%
Black or African American (non-Hispanic)	7,448	38.95%
Native American	23	0.12%
Asian	78	0.41%
Other/Mixed	455	2.38%
Hispanic or Latino	1,053	5.51%

Pike County racial composition
Race	Num.	Perc.
White (non-Hispanic)	18,036	54.64%
Black or African American (non-Hispanic)	12,068	36.56%
Native American	169	0.51%
Asian	577	1.75%
Pacific Islander	9	0.03%
Other/Mixed	1,245	3.77%
Hispanic or Latino	905	2.74%

Randolph County racial composition
Race	Num.	Perc.
White (non-Hispanic)	16,629	75.7%
Black or African American (non-Hispanic)	3,814	17.36%
Native American	50	0.23%
Asian	86	0.39%
Pacific Islander	1	0.0%
Other/Mixed	782	3.56%
Hispanic or Latino	605	2.75%

Russell County racial composition
Race	Num.	Perc.
White (non-Hispanic)	26,679	45.08%
Black or African American (non-Hispanic)	25,930	43.81%
Native American	180	0.3%
Asian	408	0.69%
Pacific Islander	128	0.22%
Other/Mixed	2,663	4.5%
Hispanic or Latino	3,195	5.4%

St. Clair County racial composition
Race	Num.	Perc.
White (non-Hispanic)	74,962	82.28%
Black or African American (non-Hispanic)	8,617	9.46%
Native American	249	0.27%
Asian	655	0.72%
Pacific Islander	20	0.02%
Other/Mixed	4,025	4.42%
Hispanic or Latino	2,575	2.83%

Shelby County racial composition
Race	Num.	Perc.
White (non-Hispanic)	162,712	72.96%
Black or African American (non-Hispanic)	28,711	12.87%
Native American	478	0.21%
Asian	5,114	2.29%
Pacific Islander	91	0.04%
Other/Mixed	9,458	4.24%
Hispanic or Latino	16,460	7.38%

Sumter County Racial Composition
Race	Num.	Perc.
White (non-Hispanic)	2,937	23.79%
Black or African American (non-Hispanic)	8,955	72.54%
Native American	26	0.21%
Asian	102	0.83%
Pacific Islander	3	0.02%
Other/Mixed	191	1.55%
Hispanic or Latino	131	1.06%

Talladega County racial composition
Race	Num.	Perc.
White (non-Hispanic)	50,732	61.76%
Black or African American (non-Hispanic)	26,340	32.06%
Native American	184	0.22%
Asian	395	0.48%
Pacific Islander	27	0.03%
Other/Mixed	2,692	3.28%
Hispanic or Latino	1,779	2.17%

Tallapoosa County racial composition
Race	Num.	Perc.
White (non-Hispanic)	28,252	68.39%
Black or African American (non-Hispanic)	10,366	25.09%
Native American	84	0.2%
Asian	222	0.54%
Other/Mixed	1,243	3.01%
Hispanic or Latino	1,144	2.77%

Tuscaloosa County, Alabama - Demographic Profile (NH = Non-Hispanic)
Race / Ethnicity	Pop 2010	Pop 2020	% 2010	% 2020
White alone (NH)	126,611	134,880	65.04%	59.41%
Black or African American alone (NH)	57,401	68,779	29.49%	30.29%
Native American or Alaska Native alone (NH)	455	420	0.23%	0.18%
Asian alone (NH)	2,293	3,241	1.18%	1.43%
Pacific Islander alone (NH)	76	94	0.04%	0.04%
Some Other Race alone (NH)	136	792	0.07%	0.35%
Mixed Race/Multi-Racial (NH)	1,735	6,532	0.89%	2.88%
Hispanic or Latino (any race)	5,949	12,298	3.06%	5.42%
Total	194,656	227,036	100.00%	100.00%

Walker County racial composition
Race	Num.	Perc.
White (non-Hispanic)	56,394	86.31%
Black or African American (non-Hispanic)	3,889	5.95%
Native American	187	0.29%
Asian	283	0.43%
Pacific Islander	2	0.0%
Other/Mixed	2,435	3.73%
Hispanic or Latino	2,152	3.29%

Washington County Racial Composition
Race	Num.	Perc.
White (non-Hispanic)	10,267	66.72%
Black or African American (non-Hispanic)	3,318	21.56%
Native American	1,102	7.16%
Asian	14	0.09%
Pacific Islander	2	0.01%
Other/Mixed	547	3.55%
Hispanic or Latino	138	0.9%

Wilcox County racial composition
Race	Num.	Perc.
White (non-Hispanic)	2,866	27.04%
Black or African American (non-Hispanic)	7,425	70.05%
Native American	11	0.1%
Asian	7	0.07%
Pacific Islander	5	0.05%
Other/Mixed	174	1.64%
Hispanic or Latino	112	1.06%

Winston County racial composition
Race	Num.	Perc.
White (non-Hispanic)	21,598	91.75%
Black or African American (non-Hispanic)	131	0.56%
Native American	83	0.35%
Asian	58	0.25%
Pacific Islander	9	0.04%
Other/Mixed	846	3.59%
Hispanic or Latino	815	3.46%

== Vital statistics ==
Note: Births in table don't add up, because Hispanics are counted both by their ethnicity and by their race, giving a higher overall number.

Live Births by Single Race/Ethnicity of Mother
Race	2014	2015	2016	2017	2018	2019	2020	2021	2022	2023	2024
White	35,929 (60.5%)	35,826 (60.1%)	34,899 (59.0%)	34,377 (58.3%)	33,776 (58.5%)	33,394 (57.0%)	32,672 (56.7%)	33,775 (58.2%)	33,725 (58.0%)	33,230 (57.4%)	33,213 (57.2%)
Black	18,417 (31.0%)	18,429 (30.9%)	17,695 (29.9%)	17,963 (30.5%)	17,597 (30.5%)	18,197 (31.0%)	17,746 (30.8%)	16,511 (28.4%)	16,067 (27.6%)	15,543 (26.9%)	14,706 (25.4%)
Asian	1,227 (2.1%)	1,193 (2.0%)	986 (1.7%)	950 (1.6%)	903 (1.6%)	886 (1.5%)	836 (1.5%)	852 (1.5%)	782 (1.3%)	820 (1.4%)	955 (1.6%)
American Indian	200 (0.3%)	190 (0.3%)	150 (0.2%)	175 (0.3%)	148 (0.2%)	188 (0.3%)	133 (0.2%)	155 (0.3%)	187 (0.3%)	139 (0.2%)	127 (0.2%)
Hispanic (any race)	4,019 (6.8%)	4,295 (7.2%)	4,580 (7.7%)	4,546 (7.7%)	4,403 (7.6%)	4,910 (8.4%)	5,233 (9.1%)	5,648 (9.7%)	6,231 (10.7%)	6,890 (11.9%)	7,701 (13.3%)
Total	59,422 (100%)	59,657 (100%)	59,151 (100%)	58,941 (100%)	57,761 (100%)	58,615 (100%)	57,647 (100%)	58,054 (100%)	58,149 (100%)	57,858 (100%)	57,934 (100%)

- Since 2016, data for births of White Hispanic origin are not collected, but included in one Hispanic group; persons of Hispanic origin may be of any race.

== Ancestry ==
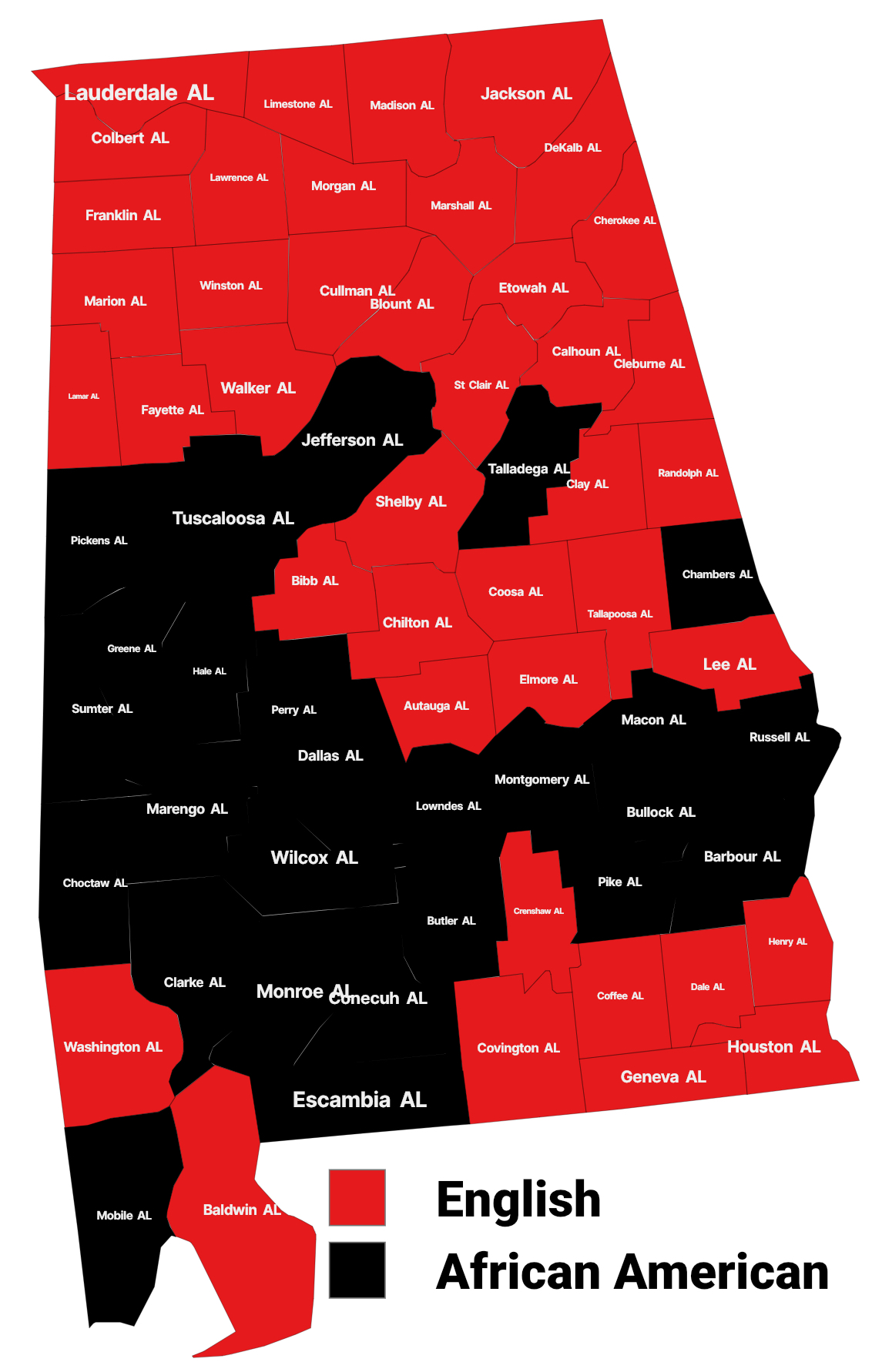
Largest alone or in any combination ethnic origin by county in Alabama, per the 2020 census

=== Black or African Americans ===
Historically, African Americans were brought to Alabama as slaves, in greatest numbers in the cotton-producing plantation region known as the Black Belt. This region remains predominantly African American, where many freedmen settled to work at agriculture after the Civil War.

=== White or European Americans ===
The northern part of the state, originally settled by small farmers with fewer slaves, is predominantly European American. The Port of Mobile, founded by the French and subsequently controlled by England, Spain, and the United States, has long had an ethnically diverse population. It has long served as an entry point for various groups settling in other parts of the state. Those citing "American" ancestry in Alabama are of overwhelmingly English extraction, however most English Americans identify simply as having American ancestry because their ancestors have been in North America for so long, in many cases since the early 1600s. Demographers estimate that a minimum of 20–23% of people in Alabama are of predominantly English ancestry and state that the figure is probably much higher. In the 1980 census 1,139,976 people in Alabama stated that they were of English ancestry out of a total state population of 2,824,719, making them 41% of the state at the time and the largest ethnic group. There are also many more people in Alabama of Scots-Irish origins than are self-reported. Many people in Alabama claim Irish ancestry because of the term "Scots-Irish", but most of the time in Alabama this term is used for those with Scottish roots, rather than Irish.

=== Native Americans ===
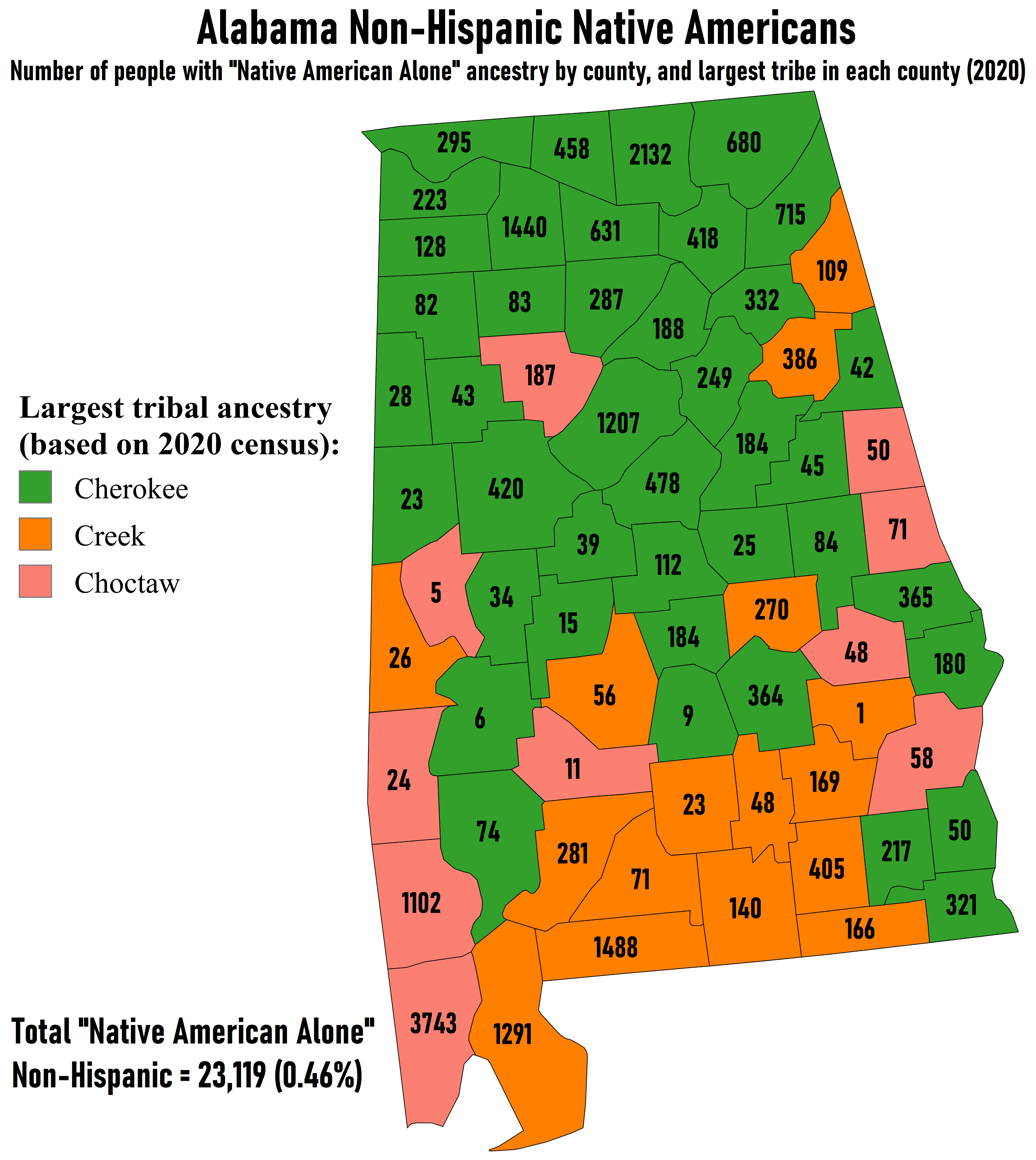
Largest Non-Hispanic Native American ancestry by county and numbers of people reporting "Native American Alone"

Alabama is home to the Cherokee, Chickasaw, Choctaw, and Creek Native American tribes. Alabama also has a growing Hispanic population.

=== Hispanic or Latino Americans ===
Mexicans are the largest Latino ethnic group in Alabama, but the state is also home to Guatemalans, Puerto Ricans, Colombians, Brazilians, Salvadorians, and Panamanians.

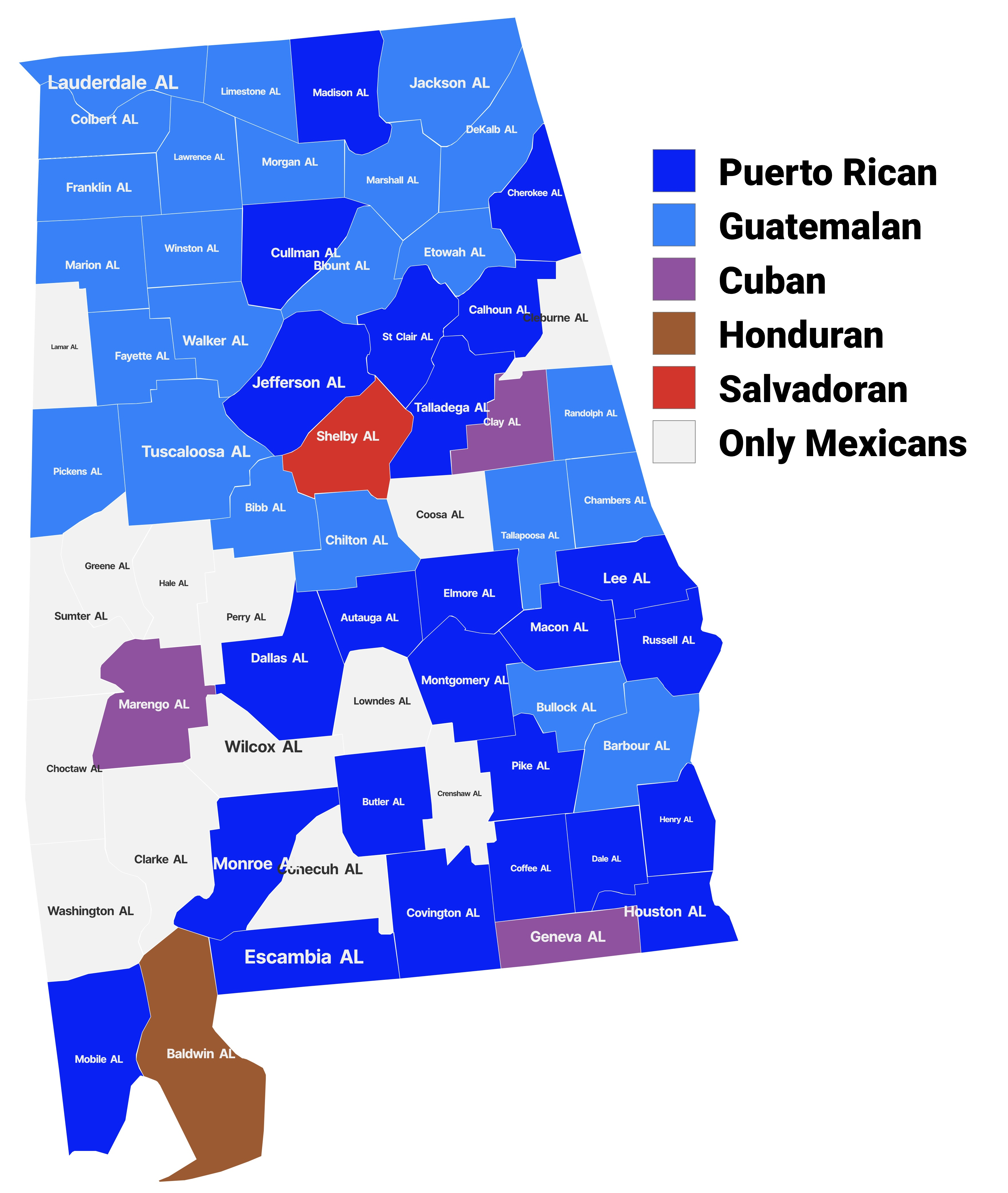
Largest non-Mexican Hispanic ethnic origin by county, per the 2020 census

=== Asian Americans ===
Filipinos, Indians, Koreans and Vietnamese people have just recently become part of the state's population.

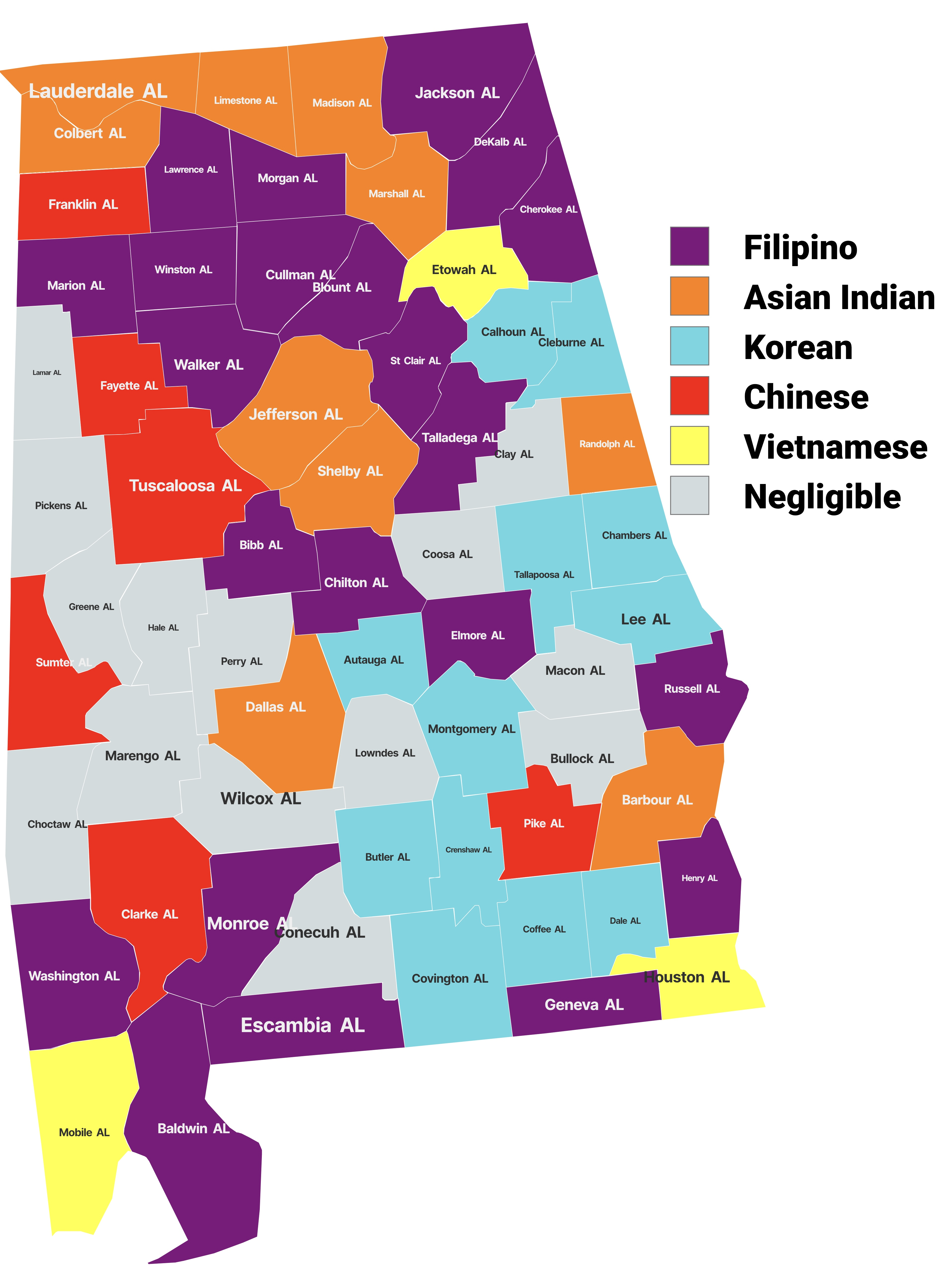
Largest Asian alone or in any combination ethnic origin in Alabama, per the 2020 census

=== Ancestries ===
Ancestry	Number (as of 2022)	%
American	594,431	11.7
Arab	15,663	0.3
Czech	4,938	0.1
Danish	4,994	0.1
Dutch	21,999	0.4
English	617,119	12.2
French (except Basque)	62,779	1.2
French Canadian	8,482	0.2
German	321,307	6.3
Greek	8,287	0.2
Hungarian	4,277	0.1
Irish	387,885	7.6
Italian	91,516	1.8
Lithuanian	1,455	0.0
Norwegian	18,331	0.4
Polish	29,225	0.6
Portuguese	3,177	0.1
Russian	8,169	0.2
Scotch-Irish	64,513	1.3
Scottish	105,300	2.1
Slovak	1,716	0.0
Subsaharan African	42,856	0.8
Swedish	18,160	0.4
Swiss	4,145	0.1
Ukrainian	3,844	0.1
Welsh	21,824	0.4
West Indian (excluding Hispanic origin groups)	12,642	0.2

== Rankings ==
Among the 50 states and the District of Columbia, Alabama ranks:
- 32nd in its percentage of European Americans
- 7th in its percentage of Blacks
- 43rd in its percentage of Hispanics
- 44th in its percentage of Asians
- 26th in its percentage of Native Americans
- 48th in its percentage of people of mixed race
- 47th in its percentage of males
- 5th in its percentage of females

== Religion ==
The religious affiliations of adult people in Alabama are as follows:

- Christian – 86%
  - Evangelical Protestant – 49%
    - Baptist – 31%
    - Pentecostal – 5%
    - Presbyterian – 2%
    - Restorationist – 3%
    - Holiness movement – 1%
  - Mainline Protestant – 13%
    - Baptist – 2%
    - Methodist – 5%
    - Lutheran – 1%
    - Presbyterian – 1%
    - Episcopalian/ – 1%
    - Congregationalist – 1%
  - Historically Black Protestant – 16%
    - Baptist – 11%
    - Methodist – 3%
    - Pentecostal – 1%
    - Holiness Family – 1%
  - Catholic – 7%
  - LDS – 1%
  - Christian – non-denominational – 6%
- Non-Christian faiths – 1%
- Other faiths – 1%
- Unaffiliated (religious "nones") – 12%
  - Atheist – 1%
  - Agnostic – 1%
  - Nothing in particular – 9%
  - Don't know – 1%

== See also ==
- Demographics of the United States
- Alabama locations by per capita income
