= Transportation in Alabama =

Overview
- Transit type: Rapid transit, commuter rail, buses, private automobile, Taxicab, bicycle, pedestrian

Operation
- Operator: Alabama Department of Transportation

The transportation system of Alabama is a cooperation of complex systems of infrastructure.

== Background ==
=== History ===
Alabama's transportation and development play a large part in the history of Alabama. From the rivers and streams to the aerospace industry, Alabama's transportation is constantly growing and evolving. In the early periods of time, water transport was the most substantial means of travel. Water transportation in Alabama began with steamboats, with the first steamboat being the Alabama that was launched in 1818 on the Alabama River. A couple years after the launch of the first steamboat, Alabama began the development of railroad transportation. Railroads solved an abundance of transportation problems and formed opportunities for businessmen. Alabama's first railroad, the Tuscumbia Railway, opened in 1832 in Franklin County. Railroads began to connect Alabama to the rest of the country. In addition, railroads played a major part in the agriculture, politics, and businesses of Alabama. Following the development of railroads, in the beginning of the twentieth century, the Good Roads Movement was organized in efforts to advance modern roads and to persuade the government to further fund the construction and maintenance of the roads. In the early 1900s, the Good Roads movement brought about change in the Alabama state law, which allowed for the production of state highways. This even went a long way in to the 1920s, where the first of many long-distance highways were created in Alabama. Although building the modern roads seemed to bring a rise in the efficiency of transportation, there were some downfalls to building these roads. A big downfall to the production of roads was the high level of maintenance that they required, such as cutting trees, pulling stumps, leveling, and shoveling eroded dirt. In 1898, John H. Bankhead and John Asa Rountree founded the North Alabama Good Roads Association. This organization was focused on improving transportation by having the state highways paid for by the state government and administered by the state highway commission. This was only the beginning of transportation in Alabama. In 1910, aviation in Alabama came into play. Wilbur and Orville Wright formed the first landing sight in Alabama, which is now known as the Maxwell Air Force Base. During World War I, aviation in Alabama became very popular; there were a good number of Alabamians who joined the war and received flight training. In addition, Alabama's airports played a significant role in World War II, by coordinating the movement of troops and providing training facilities for troops as well as support personnel. Besides water transportation, modern roads, railroads, and aviation, aerospace is Alabama's largest industrial industry. With major sites of the Marshall Space Flight Center and the Redstone Arsenal located in Hunstville, Alabama, Alabama's aerospace industry consists of four sectors: space, defense, aviation, and maintenance, repair, and overhaul. Transportation in Alabama has come a long way from steamboats to rocket ships and transportation continues to develop throughout the years.

== Roads and freeways ==
Alabama has 140,191 rural and 66,384 urban lane miles.

Alabama has 1001 miles of interstate road which cover 4558 miles of lanes. 66% of fatalities occur on rural road.

== Highways ==
Alabama is criss-crossed by many major roadways.

=== Interstate Highways ===
Current

- I-10
- I-20
- I-22
  - Future I-222
  - Future I-422
- I-59
  - I-359
  - I-459
  - I-759
- I-65
  - I-165
  - I-565
- I-85
  - Future I-685

=== U.S. Highways ===
- US 11
  - US 411
- US 29
- US 31
  - US 231
  - US 331
  - US 431
- US 43
- US 45
- US 72
- US 78
  - US 278
- US 80
  - US 280
- US 82
- US 84
- US 90
- US 98

== Port Infrastructure ==
=== Seaports ===
The Port of Mobile, Alabama's only saltwater port, is a busy seaport on the Gulf of Mexico with inland waterway access to the Midwest by way of the Tennessee-Tombigbee Waterway. The Port of Mobile is currently the 9th-largest by tonnage in the United States.

Barge transportation in and out of the Port of Tuscaloosa and other commercial navigation make the Black Warrior River useful in the state of Alabama.

== See also ==
- Plug-in electric vehicles in Alabama
