= Aviation in Alabama =

Aviation in US state

- Aviation in the United States
- Alabama State Flag

Airports
- Commercial – primary: 5
- Commercial – non-primary: 1
- General aviation: 65
- Other public-use airports: 24
- Military and other airports: 9

First flight
- 10 March 1910

Alabama's first aeronautical event was on 10 March 1910 with the flight of a Wright biplane flown by Orville Wright in Montgomery, Alabama.

== Events ==
- 1909: E.T. Odum brings an aircraft to the Alabama State Fair.
- 15 March 1910: Orville and Wilbur Wright establish the nation's first civilian flying school in Montgomery, Alabama.
- 1931: Steadham Acker starts the National Air Carnival series of air shows at Birmingham Municipal Airport.
- 10 July 1991: L'Express Airlines Flight 508 crashed at Birmingham Municipal Airport.

== Aircraft Manufacturers ==
- Boeing manufactures the Delta IV rocket in Decatur, Alabama.
- Continental Motors, Inc., Mobile, Alabama 1929- Major producer of aircraft engines for general aviation aircraft.
- Airbus builds aircraft in the A320 family at the Mobile Aeroplex at Brookley industrial complex.

== Aerospace ==
73,000 jobs are based in Alabama in support of aerospace.

- National Space Science and Technology Center a joint research venture between NASA and the seven research universities of the state of Alabama.
- Continental Motors Services provides final assembly of the CD-135 and CD-155 engine in Fairhope, Alabama.

== Airports ==
- List of Airports in Alabama

== Colleges and universities ==
- Auburn University is home to the nation's oldest continually operated flight school and is the only 4-year aviation degree in the State of Alabama. In 2022, Auburn University built the Delta Air Lines Aviation Education Building that included an Airbus 320 commercial airline simulator.

== Commercial Service ==
- Birmingham-Shuttlesworth International Airport provides air service with 1.4 million operations annually.

== Government and Military ==
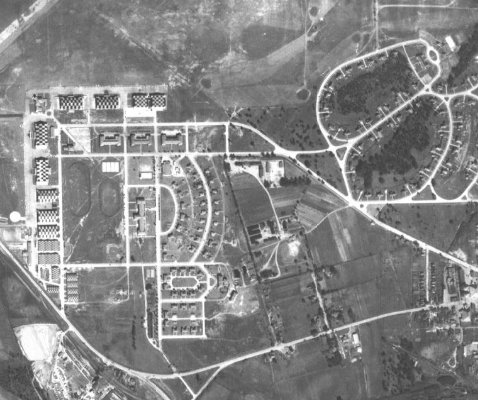
Overhead view of Maxwell Field in 1937

- All flight operations in Alabama are conducted within FAA oversight.
- Maxwell Air Force Base is the headquarters of Air University (United States Air Force).
- The Redstone Arsenal supports missile and space operations.
- The Marshall Space Flight Center supports NASA operations.
- The U. S. Army Air Corps' Tuskegee Airmen were trained at Tuskegee, Alabama
- The Alabama State Trooper Aviation Unit was formed in 1975 using four Bell H-13 Sioux and one Cessna 182. The unit currently operates one Bell 206L, one Bell 407, seven OH-58 helicopters and three Cessna 182’s, a Piper Navajo and King Air 200.
- Cullman City Police Department operates two OH-58, Dale County Sheriff's Office operates 3 OH-58's, Etowah County Sheriff's Office operates one OH-58 and one Cessna 172, Jefferson County Sheriff's Office operates two OH-58's, Limestone County Alabama Sheriff's Office operates one OH-58, Morgan County Sheriff's Office operates one OH-58, Tuscaloosa County Sheriff's Aviation Unit operates two OH-58's, Tuscaloosa Alabama Police Department operates two OH-58's

== Museums ==
- The Southern Museum of Flight is located in Birmingham, Alabama and houses the Alabama Aviation Hall of Fame.
- The United States Army Aviation Museum is located on Fort Novosel near Ozark, Alabama.
- The U.S. Space & Rocket Center is located in Huntsville, Alabama

== Gallery ==
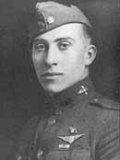
James Meissner, World War I flying ace and Birmingham resident

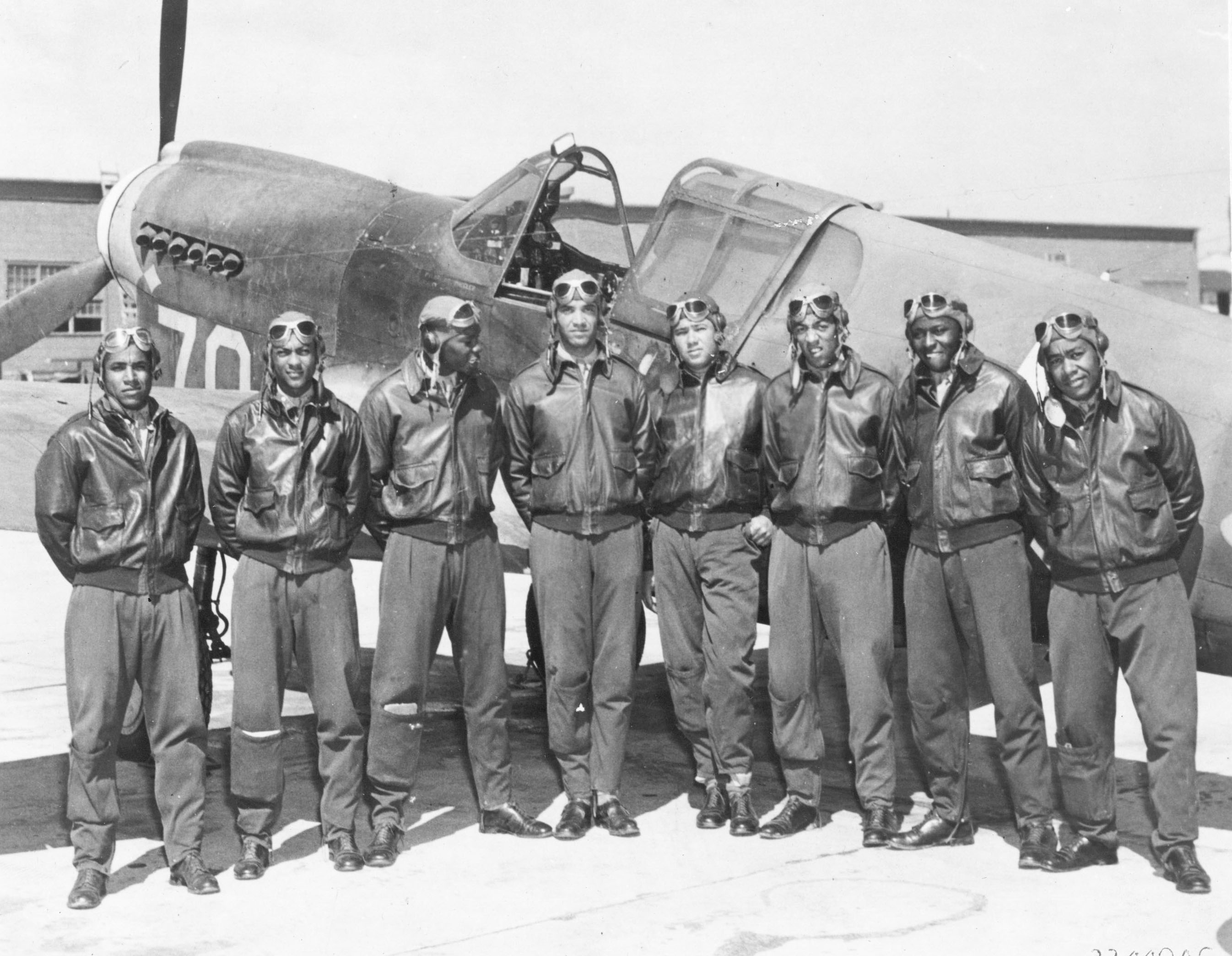
A group of Tuskegee Airmen posing with a P-40 during World War II

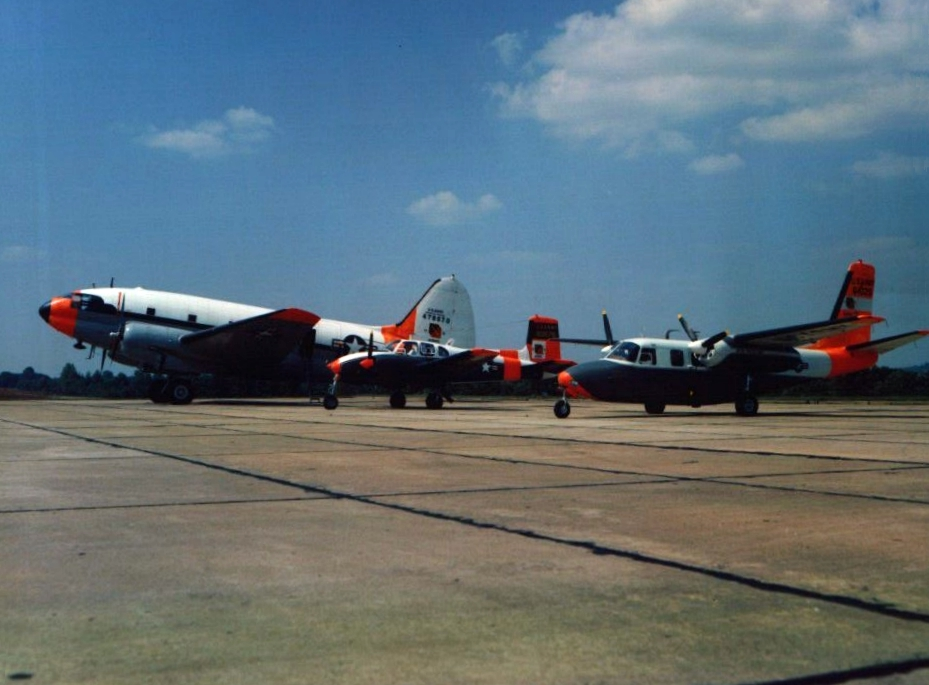
Aircraft at the Redstone Army Airfield in Huntsville

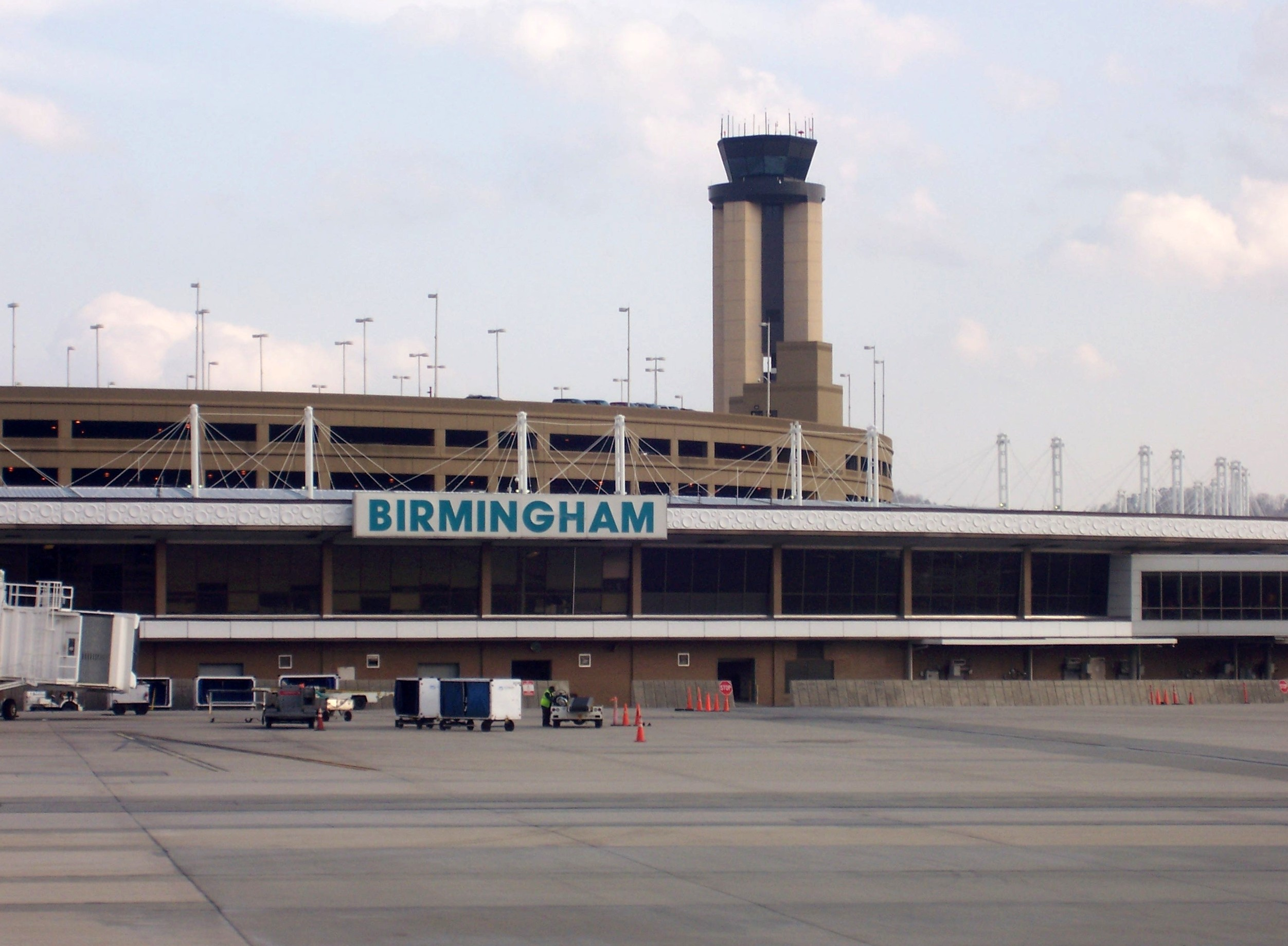
Birmingham-Shuttlesworth International Airport

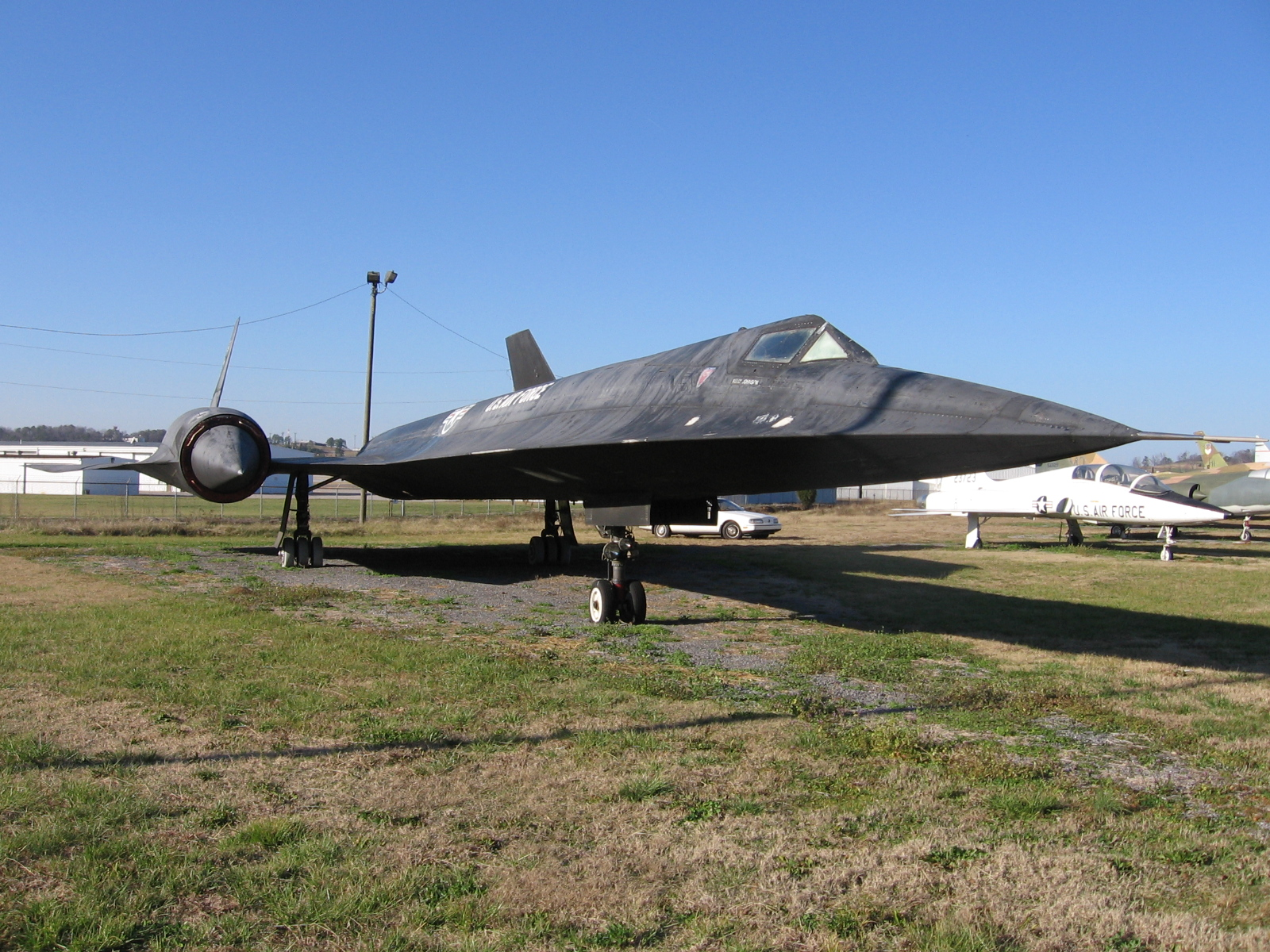
Lockheed A-12 at the Southern Museum of Flight in Birmingham

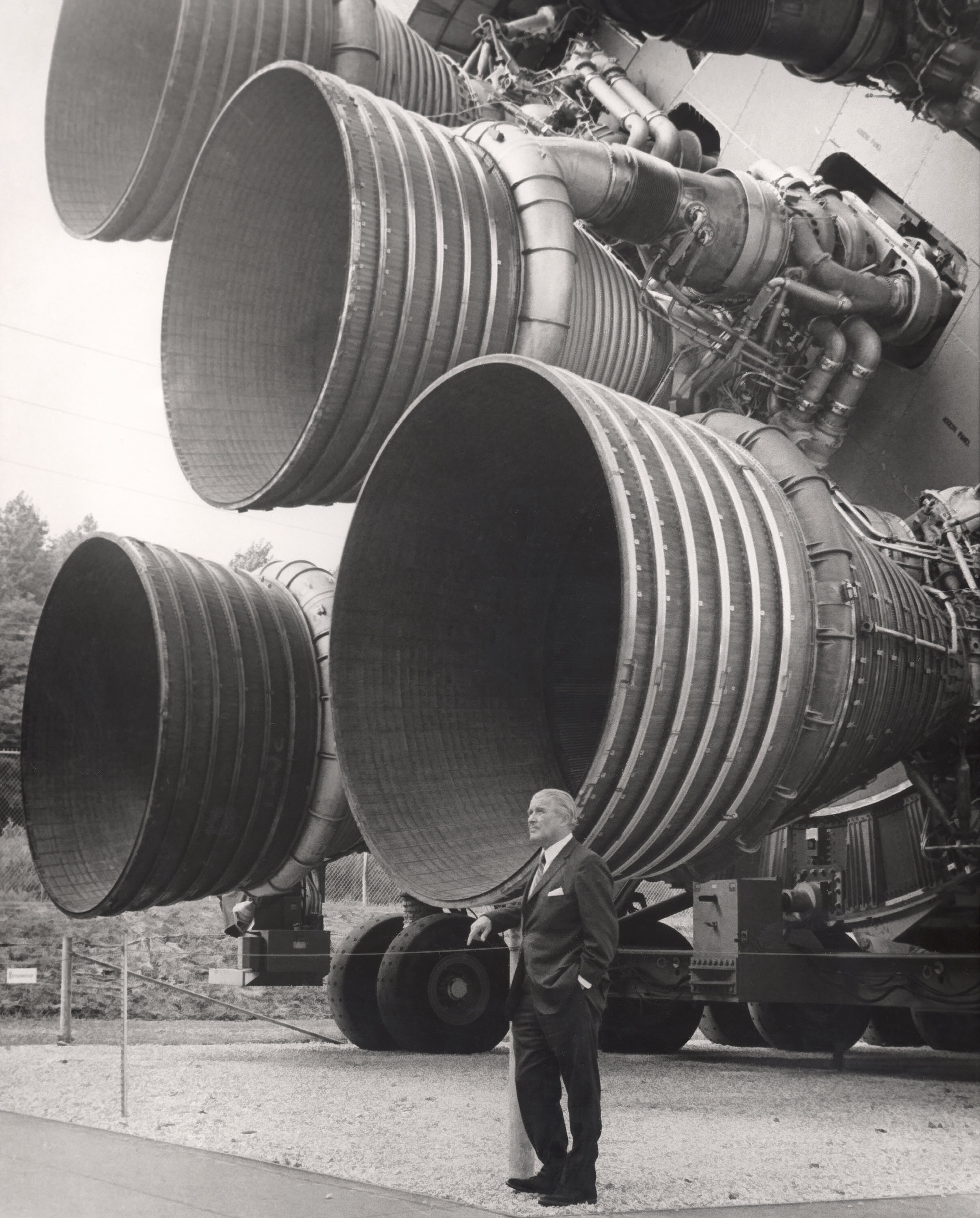
Wernher von Braun posing with the Saturn V's S-IC engines in Huntsville

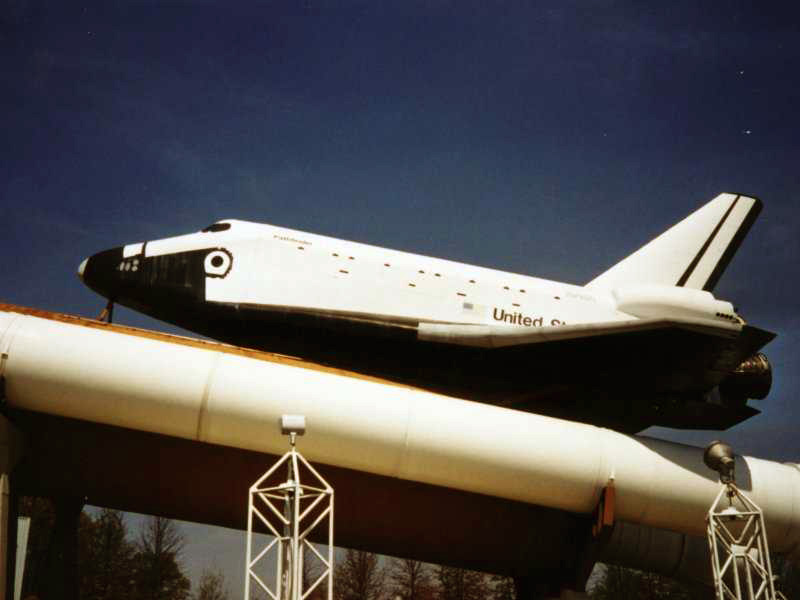
Space Shuttle Pathfinder at the U.S. Space and Rocket Center in Huntsville
