= History of the University of West Alabama =

== Early Beginnings: 1835–1919 ==
The University of West Alabama was chartered in 1835 as Livingston Female Academy and State Normal College, a church-related female academy, and admitted its first students in 1839. After difficult times during the Civil War and Reconstruction periods, the school reopened in the late 1860s or early 1870s. Although it appears that a few male students were admitted following the reopening, a resolution by the board of trustees in 1876 excluded boys, and this policy was followed until the beginning of the 20th century. Livingston Female Academy and State Normal College continued as a women's college with some State support until 1907, when the State assumed full control. It remained under its own board of trustees, however, until the Alabama Legislature created a State Board of Trustees for all the normal schools in 1911. In 1919 this board was abolished and all state normal schools were placed under the supervision of the State Board of Education. During these early years the school offered both secondary education and normal school programs for the training of teachers.

== Depression Era: 1920–1956 ==
In 1929 the school at Livingston became State Teachers College, Livingston, Alabama, with authority to confer the degree of Bachelor of Science. The Bachelor of Arts degree was authorized in 1947. Although the institution had begun accepting male students soon after 1900, the student body remained predominantly female through the 1950s.

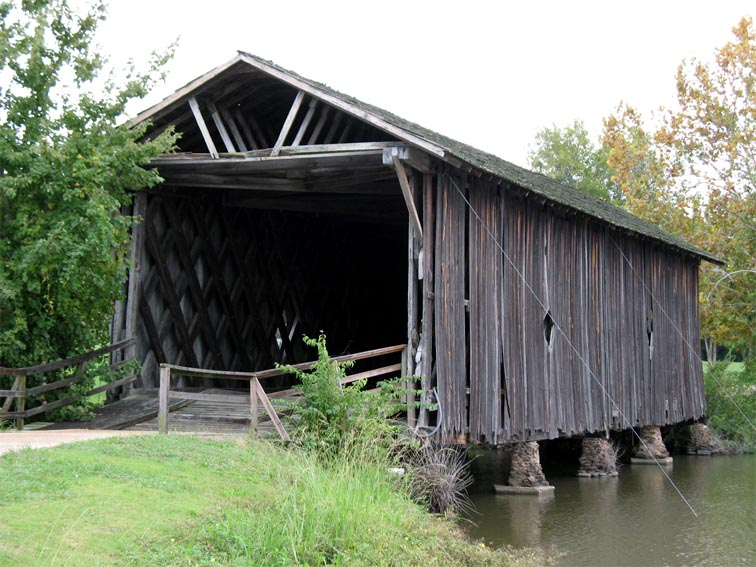
The Alamuchee-Bellamy Covered Bridge on campus

== Name Changes: 1957–1994 ==
In 1957 the name was again changed by an act of Legislature — this time to Livingston State College — and the following year the mission of the institution was broadened when the Graduate Division was established and the College was authorized to confer master's degrees in the field of professional education. In 1967 an act of the Legislature created Livingston University, with its own board of trustees. In 1971 a longtime historic landmark in Sumter County, the Alamuchee-Bellamy Covered Bridge (built 1861), was restored and moved on campus by the Sumter County Historical Society. It currently spans the northeast corner of Duck Pond behind Reed Hall.

== Present Day: 1995 – Present ==
In 1995 the institution recognized its broader mission as a regional university serving the educational needs of all the citizens of the area by changing its name to The University of West Alabama. Dating back to 2002, a record enrollment has been reached for five consecutive years at the university. In the fall of 2005, enrollment reached the 3,000 mark for the first time and went on to reach the 4,000 mark in the fall of 2007. More information about the university enrollment can be found at http://www.uwa.edu/about/universityoverview/quickfacts/quickenrollmentfacts

== Presidents ==
Presidents of The University of West Alabama http://admissions.uwa.edu/history.asp
Person	Years	Person	Years
Dr. Carlos SmithHead of Institution	1870–1881	Julia TutwilerPresident	1881–1910
Dr. George William BrockPresident	1910–1936	Dr. Noble Franklin GreenhillPresident	1936–1944
Dr. William Wilson HillPresident	1944–1954	Dr. Delos Poe CulpPresident	1954–1963
Dr. John E. DeloneyPresident	1963–1972	Dr. Ralph M. LyonActing President	1972–1973
Dr. Asa N. GreenPresident	1973–1993	Dr. James Bob DrakeInterim President	1993–1994
Dr. Don C. HinesPresident	1994–1998	Dr. Ed RoachPresident	1998–2002
Dr. Richard Holland President	2002–2014	Mr. John Blackwell President	2014
Dr. Ken Tucker President	2015–present		

NOTE: Dr. Holland is the first UWA graduate to serve as the president of the University.
Previously, he was the Dean of the College of Natural Sciences and Mathematics.
