= List of Alabama Crimson Tide in the College Football Hall of Fame =

The Alabama Crimson Tide college football team competes as part of the National Collegiate Athletic Association (NCAA) Division I Football Bowl Subdivision (FBS), and represents the University of Alabama in the Western Division of the Southeastern Conference (SEC). The College Football Hall of Fame was established in 1951 to honor the careers of selected student-athletes who have competed in college football as either a player or coach. Since its inaugural class that year, Alabama has had 28 persons elected to the Hall of Fame as either a player or coach of the Crimson Tide. (23 players and 5 coaches)

The first Alabama inductees into the Hall of Fame were Don Hutson and Frank Thomas as part of the inaugural class in 1951. The most recent inductee was Mark Ingram II as part of the 2026 class.

== Selections ==
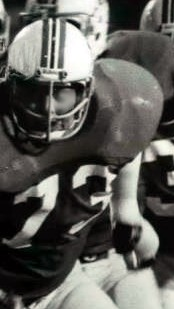
John Hannah who played for the Crimson Tide from 1970 to 1972 was inducted into the College Football Hall of Fame in 1999.

List of players in the College Football Hall of Fame showing the player, position, years at Alabama, year inducted and references (Note: Although Frank Howard played guard for Alabama from the 1928 to 1930 seasons, he was inducted to the Hall of Fame in recognition of his accomplishments as head coach at Clemson and as a result is not included as part of Alabama's listing.)
Player name	Position	Years at Alabama	Year inducted	References
Cornelius Bennett	LB	1983–1986	2005	
Johnny Mack Brown	HB	1923–1925	1957	
Paul "Bear" Bryant	Head coach	1958–1982	1986	
Johnny Cain	QB / FB	1930–1932	1973	
Sylvester Croom	C	1972–1974	2022	
Harry Gilmer	HB	1944–1947	1993	
John Hannah	G	1970–1972	1999	
Dixie Howell	HB	1932–1934	1970	
Allison "Pooley" Hubert	FB	1922–1925	1964	
Don Hutson	End	1932–1934	1951	
Mark Ingram II	RB	2008–2010	2026	
Lee Roy Jordan	LB	1960–1962	1983	
E. J. Junior	LB	1977–1980	2020	
Antonio Langham	CB	1990–1993	2024	
Woodrow Lowe	LB	1972–1975	2009	
Marty Lyons	DT	1975–1978	2011	
Vaughn Mancha	C	1944–1947	1990	
Johnny Musso	HB	1969–1971	2000	
Billy Neighbors	T	1959–1961	2003	
Ozzie Newsome	WR/TE	1974–1977	1994	
Nick Saban	Head coach	2007–2023	2025	
Fred Sington	T	1928–1930	1955	
Riley Smith	QB	1934–1935	1985	
Gene Stallings	Head coach	1990–1996	2010	
Derrick Thomas	LB	1985–1988	2014	
Frank Thomas	Head coach	1931–1946	1951	
Wallace Wade	Head coach	1923–1930	1955	
Don Whitmire	T	1941–1942	1956	
