= Tobacco in Alabama =

Tobacco is an agricultural product acting as a stimulant triggering complex biochemical and neurotransmitter disruptions. Its main ingredient is nicotine and it is present in all cigarettes. Early tobacco usage was for medical cures and religious purposes. In the early 1900s, cigarette usage became increasingly popular when it was sold in mass amounts. In 1964, the Surgeon General of the United States wrote a report concerning the dangers of cigarette smoking. In the United States, for the past 50 years efforts have been made so that the public should be aware of the risks of tobacco usage.

In Alabama, 22.1% of the adult population (ages 18+), over 783,000 individuals, are current cigarette smokers. Across all states, the prevalence of cigarette smoking among adults ranges from 9.3% to 26.5%. Alabama ranks 42nd among the states. Among youth ages 12–17, 12.0% smoke in Alabama. The range across all states is 6.5% to 15.9%. Alabama ranks 40th among the states.

Among adults age 35+ years, over 7,600 died as a result of tobacco use per year, on average, during 2000–2004. This represents a smoking-attributable mortality rate of 317.5 per 100,000. Alabama's smoking-attributable mortality rate ranks 44th among the states. Also, approximately 850 adult non-smokers die each year from exposure to secondhand smoke.

== Anti-tobacco actions ==
=== Nonprofit groups ===
The American Lung Association, an organization which campaigns against the use of tobacco, is a member of the Coalition for a Tobacco-Free Alabama and works towards reducing the tobacco usage in the state. They try to discourage tobacco usage by working to create smoke-free environments and advocating an increase of tobacco taxes.

=== State legislative efforts ===
While Alabama does not have a statewide smoking ban, smoking is prohibited in many public places and meetings because of the Alabama Clean Indoor Act which was enacted in 2003. State local governments have their own bans against smoking in their counties. A bill for a statewide smoking ban failed in the Alabama Legislature in May 2008. Alabama attempted to pass a smoking ban again in 2009, that was stalled when its author, Vivian Figures, pulled the bill from Senate consideration after it was amended by Senate to include smoking exemptions in certain places. In March 2011, a new bill was proposed, that if passed would ban smoking in all public places.

=== Youth initiatives ===
In 2008, a student group called Students Working Against Tobacco (SWAT) received $28,000 from the Alabama Department of Public Health to spread their message. SWAT operates out of Bryant, LeFlore and Murphy high schools and Phillips Preparatory middle school.

The Youth Empowerment Program is a peer-teaching model that provides anti-tobacco messages to more than 58,000 teens according to Alabama's state health officer Don Williamson. The state funds community groups to educate people about the dangers of second-hand smoke and to encourage young people to reject tobacco use. The State Health Department also has a new teen cessation project that uses advertising on television and radio, as well as a MySpace page.

The Auburn CARES Coalition and the Alabama Department of Public Health encourage young people to make healthy tobacco-free choices and for those using chewing tobacco to quit. ADPH offers a free support and counseling service to help users successfully quit.

== Economic impact ==
The State of Tobacco Control 2010 Report grades states on their anti-tobacco efforts; in this report, Alabama received straight "Fs". The state was graded in four categories:

- spending on programs to prevent and control tobacco use
- statewide smoking restrictions
- tax levied on cigarettes
- payment for medications and counseling for Medicaid patients and state employees who are trying to quit smoking

Alabama ranked right at the bottom in all four categories. For every smoker in Alabama, $993 a year is spent on hospital care as a result of smoking. A national study shows that Alabama's economy suffers $5.6 billion a year in direct costs because of smoking, which also includes more than $1 billion in lost workplace productivity and $1.7 billion in direct medical expenditures.

== Smoking costs in Alabama ==
- Alabamians spend $842 million a year on drugs directly as a result of smoking.
- Nearly $125 million a year is spent by Alabamians in nursing homes directly as a result of smoking.
- For every smoker in Alabama, $993 a year is spent on hospital care as a result of smoking.
- Annual health care costs in Alabama directly caused by smoking: $1.49 billion
- Portion covered by the state Medicaid program: $238 million
- Residents' state and federal tax burden from smoking-caused government expenditures: $540.
- Smoking-caused productivity losses in Alabama: $2.24 billion.

== Alabama bills on smoking ==
Specific smoking regulatory bills passed in Alabama include the following:

- Summary of Bill: Section 22-15A-4 focuses on issues of smoking in public places. It states Alabama's general prohibition against smoking in public arenas and lists four specific exceptions to this law.
- Section 22-15A-4 "Prohibition against smoking in public places; exceptions. (a) No person shall smoke in a public place or at a public meeting except as otherwise provided in this subsection and in Section 22-15A-7. This prohibition does not apply in any of the following places: (1) Bars and lounges. (2) Retail tobacco stores and tobacco businesses. (3) Limousines used under private hire by an individual or corporation. (4) Hotel and motel rooms rented to guests, except for those rooms designated by the hotels and motels as 'no smoking' rooms. (b) Smoking by patients in a chemical dependency treatment program or mental health program may be allowed in a separated well-ventilated area pursuant to a policy established by the administrator of the program that identifies circumstances in which prohibiting smoking would interfere with the treatment of persons recovering from chemical dependency or mental illness." (Act 2003–314, p. 770, §4.)
- Summary of Bill: Section 22-15A-6 discusses required designation of smoking areas in public venues. It states forbidden and allowed areas that may be designated, as well as ventilation requirements that must be met in areas where smoking is allowed.
- Section 22-15A-6 "Designation of smoking areas; requirements; nonsmoking policies.(a) Pursuant to this section, the person in charge of a public place may designate an area for the use of smokers. Notwithstanding the foregoing, a smoking area may not be designated and no person may smoke in any of the following unless the area is enclosed and well ventilated: (1) Child care facilities.(2) Hospitals, health care clinics, doctors' offices, physical therapy facilities, and dentists' offices. (3) Elevators. (4) Buses, taxicabs, and other means of public conveyance. (5) Government buildings, except private offices. (6) Restrooms.(7) Service lines. (8) Public areas of aquariums, galleries, libraries, and museums. (9) Lobbies, hallways, and other common areas in apartment buildings, senior citizen residences, nursing homes, and other multiple-unit residential facilities. (10) Polling places.(11) Schools or other school facilities or enclosed school sponsored events for grades K-12. (12) Retail establishments, excluding restaurants, except areas in retail establishments not open to the public. (13) Lobbies, hallways, and other common areas in multiple-unit commercial facilities. (b) If a smoking area is designated, existing physical barriers and ventilation systems shall be used to minimize the toxic effect of smoke, and no more than one-fourth of the total square footage in any public place within a single enclosed area shall be reserved and designated for smokers unless clientele dictates otherwise. No area designated as a smoking area shall contain common facilities which are expected to be used by the public. (c) Nothing in this section shall be construed to prevent any owner, operator, manager, or other person who controls any establishment or facility from declaring and enforcing a nonsmoking policy in the entire establishment or facility. (d) Notwithstanding any other provision of this section or this chapter, if any restaurant is deemed by its owner as being too small to have a designated smoking area, it shall be left up to the discretion of the owner if the facility will be a 'smoking' or a 'nonsmoking' facility." (Act 2003-314, p. 770, §6.)
- Summary of Bill: Section 22-15A-7 explores the technical aspect of non-smoking zones by discussing "No Smoking" signs, describing the "No Smoking" diagram, emphasizing the importance of proper placement of signs, and outlining repercussions of non-smoking zone violations.
- Section 22-15A-7 "Posting of 'No Smoking' and 'Smoking Area' signs; violations of chapter.(a) A 'No Smoking' sign or signs, or the international 'No Smoking' symbol, which consists of a pictorial representation of a burning cigarette enclosed in a circle with a bar across, shall be prominently posted and properly maintained where smoking is prohibited by this chapter, by the owner, operator, manager, or other person in charge of the facility. 'Smoking Area' signs shall also be posted as appropriate in public places. (b) The person(s) in charge of a public place who observes a person in possession of a lighted tobacco product in apparent violation of this chapter shall inform that person that smoking is not permitted in that area by law." (Act 2003–314, p. 770, §7.)
- Summary of Bill: Section 22-15A-10 states that chapter smoking laws will not restrict or supersede county, city, town, or village laws as long as minimum standards are met.
- Section 22-15A-10 "Local laws, ordinances, or regulations. Nothing in this chapter shall be construed to restrict the power of any county, city, town, or village to adopt and enforce local laws, ordinances, or regulations that comply with at least the minimum applicable standards set forth in this chapter." (Act 2003–314, p. 770, §11.)

== Tobacco and Alabama's youth ==
While the number of high school smokers is at an all-time low, 22.1 percent or 12,400 children under 18 still become new smokers each year. It is estimated that 174,000 kids who are now under the age of 18 and alive in Alabama will ultimately die prematurely from smoking. Furthermore, offsetting the positive trend of reduced smoking rates in youth is an increase in the use of smokeless tobacco products such as snuff, dip, and chew.

A new product called "Snus," described as a smokeless, spitless, less detectable way to use tobacco is marketed to young users. With higher levels of nicotine than other snuff products, it contains some of the same carcinogens and is more addictive.

On the 2009 Auburn City School's Pride Student Survey, 10 percent of 10th graders and one out of seven seniors reported using smokeless tobacco products in the last year. This is a dangerous trend since smokeless tobacco products are not safer, and a user's chance of getting oral cancer is 50 times greater than a non-user.
