= List of law schools in Alabama =

This is a list of law schools in Alabama, arranged in alphabetical order.

Law School	City	ABA Accredited
Birmingham School of Law	Birmingham	No
Cumberland School of Law (Samford University)	Birmingham	Yes
Miles Law School	Birmingham	No
Thomas Goode Jones School of Law (Faulkner University)	Montgomery	Yes
University of Alabama School of Law	Tuscaloosa	Yes
