= Electoral reform in Alabama =

U.S. state electoral reform

Since 2006, efforts have been made to reform the electoral system in the U.S. state of Alabama.

== Twenty-first century ==
In 2006, HB 711 was introduced to use preferential ballots for overseas military voters. It was passed by the Alabama House of Representatives. In March 2007, the 11th Circuit Court of Appeals heard arguments as to whether Alabama election law unfairly restricts third-party and independent candidates from the state ballot. Candidates are required to collect signatures from 3% of the total number of voters who voted in the previous gubernatorial election in order to gain ballot access. Ordinarily, such candidates would gather signatures at the polling place at the party primary, but Alabama made it more difficult by moving the deadline for signature turn-in to the date of the primary. Alabama ranks third nationally in disenfranchising formerly incarcerated citizens. One out of every 14 Alabama residents is disenfranchised. To regain the right to vote, individuals convicted of crimes of "moral turpitude" that have completed a felony sentence must apply to the Alabama Board of Pardons and Paroles for a Certificate of Eligibility to Register to Vote. As soon as they apply for a pardon they automatically receive the right to vote back. This is the new rule of law and was passed through the House and the Senate due to voter disenfranchisement. In 2007, HB 192 was introduced to join the National Popular Vote Interstate Compact, but it failed in the Constitution & Elections committee.

== Ballot access ==
Major party candidates are chosen through the state primary process. Independent candidates can gain ballot access by submitting a petition, while minor party candidates are nominated through a convention and also require a petition. The petition must gather 3% of the total votes from the last election for the particular race or 3% of the total votes from the last gubernatorial election for statewide ballot access. In 2006, the requirement for statewide ballot access was 41,012 approved signatures. Typically, an additional 20-30% more signatures are needed to account for invalid submissions. To maintain ballot access, a third party must achieve at least 20% of the vote in a statewide race and will retain access until the following election. Individuals like Bill Redpath, among other third party reformers, advocate for more lenient ballot access laws.
