= 2026 in Alabama =

- Decades: 2000s; 2010s; 2020s
- See also: History of Alabama; Historical outline of Alabama; List of years in Alabama; 2026 in the United States

The following is a list of events of the year 2026 in Alabama.

== Incumbents ==
=== State Government ===
- Governor: Kay Ivey (R)

== Events ==
- January 27 – The Alabama House of Representatives passes a bill (73-6) expanding the death penalty for child rapists.
- February 5 – The Alabama Senate passes the death penalty bill for child rapists with a 33-1 vote.
- February 12 – Governor Kay Ivey signs the death penalty bill for child rapists into law.
- March 10 – Governor Ivey commutes the death sentence of Charles Lee Burton. Burton had been sentenced to death for murder of Doug Battle during a 1991 robbery in Talladega, though he was not the one who shot Battle and was charged under the felony murder rule. Derrick DeBruce, the one who fired the fatal shot, was previously sent to death row before he was re-sentenced to life in prison upon appeal.
- March 27 – Five of the six men charged in connection to a 2023 mass shooting that killed four in Dadeville plead guilty to murder and assault.
- March 31 – The Alabama Senate passes a bill that requires display of Ten Commandments in public schools with a 27-6 vote.
- April 10 – The Alabama House of Representatives passes a bill (81-10) that requires the display of Ten Commandments in public schools.
- April 11 – Governor Kay Ivey signs the Ten Commandments bill into law.
- May 11 – The Supreme Court lifts a ruling that had blocked Alabama from using a congressional map that had been ruled racially discriminatory.
- May 19 – Incumbent U.S. Senator Tommy Tuberville (Republican) and former U.S. Senator Doug Jones (Democrat) win their primaries for the 2026 Alabama gubernatorial election.
- June 2 – The Supreme Court allows Alabama to redistrict their congressional map for the upcoming midterm elections. Their new map favors the Republican Party.
- June 17 – A lawsuit is filed in Montgomery County against Tommy Tuberville, claiming he should be disqualified for running for governor due to not meeting residency requirements.
- October 1
  - Death Penalty for child rapists law becomes effective.
  - Ten Commandments display in public schools law become effective.
- October 9 – Hurricane Isaias makes landfall in Alabama. Two deaths are reported in Jefferson County.
- October 31 – One person is killed and eight injured in a shooting outside the Magic City Classic in Birmingham.
- November 3 – 2026 Alabama elections:
  - 2026 Alabama gubernatorial election: Senator Tommy Tuberville wins the election, beating former Senator Doug Jones.
  - 2026 United States Senate election in Alabama: Representative Barry Moore wins election, beating Democratic candidate Everett Wess.
  - 2026 United States House of Representatives elections in Alabama: Republicans win 5 of Alabama's seats and Democrats 2, the same number as the last House election.

== See also ==
- 2026 in the United States
