= 1819 in Alabama =

- Decades: 1810s; 1820s; 1830s
- See also: History of Alabama; Historical outline of Alabama; List of years in Alabama; 1819 in the United States

The following is a list of events of the year 1819 in Alabama.

== Incumbents ==
=== State government ===
- Governor: William Wyatt Bibb (D-R)

== Events ==
- November 9 – William Wyatt Bibb is elected as the first governor of Alabama.
- December 14 – The Alabama Territory is admitted to the union of the United States, as the 22nd U.S. state.

== See also ==
- 1819 in the United States
