= 2023 in Alabama =

- Decades: 2000s; 2010s; 2020s
- See also: History of Alabama; Historical outline of Alabama; List of years in Alabama; 2023 in the United States

The following is a list of events of the year 2023 in Alabama.

== Incumbents ==
=== State government ===
- Governor: Kay Ivey (R)

== Events ==
- January 12 – Tornado outbreak of January 12, 2023: A tornado outbreak in Alabama and Georgia damages several towns and kills at least six people.
- February 15 –Two people are killed after a Sikorsky UH-60 Black Hawk helicopter crashes in Madison County.
- April 15 – Four people are killed and 28 others are injured by a mass shooting at a birthday party in Dadeville.
- April 24 – Solar Cycle 25: A geomagnetic storm hits Earth, causing auroras as far south as Alabama. The storm registers at a G4.
- August 5 – A large brawl breaks out between the operators of a private boat and the employees of a city-owned riverboat at the riverfront dock in Montgomery. The fight gains significant media attention due to its violent nature and racial undertones; the riverboat employees were mostly Black while the private boat owners were White.
- August 25 – The Alabama attorney general’s office makes a filing with the Supreme Court of Alabama indicating plans to carry out a death penalty by nitrogen hypoxia, an execution method that is authorized in three US states but has never been used.

== See also ==
- 2023 in the United States
