= 2020 in Alabama =

- Decades: 2000s; 2010s; 2020s
- See also: History of Alabama; Historical outline of Alabama; List of years in Alabama; 2020 in the United States

Events from the year 2020 in Alabama.

Major stories in Alabama during 2020 included the COVID-19 pandemic in Alabama, the 2020 United States presidential election in Alabama, the 2020 United States Senate election in Alabama, the state's response to the coronavirus pandemic, hurricane impacts during the 2020 season, and major developments in state politics, education, business, and sports.

== Office holders ==
=== State office holders ===
- Governor of Alabama: Kay Ivey (Republican)
- Lieutenant Governor of Alabama: Will Ainsworth (Republican)
- Attorney General of Alabama: Steve Marshall (Republican)
- Secretary of State of Alabama: John H. Merrill (Republican)
- Speaker of the Alabama House of Representatives: Mac McCutcheon (Republican)
- President pro tempore of the Alabama Senate Del Marsh (Republican)
- Chief Justice, Supreme Court of Alabama: Tom Parker

=== Mayors of major cities ===
- Mayor of Birmingham: Randall Woodfin
- Mayor of Montgomery: Steven Reed
- Mayor of Mobile: Sandy Stimpson
- Mayor of Huntsville: Tommy Battle
- Mayor of Tuscaloosa: Walt Maddox
- Mayor of Hoover: Frank Brocato
- Mayor of Dothan: Mark Saliba
- Mayor of Auburn: Ron Anders
- Mayor of Decatur: Tab Bowling
- Mayor of Madison: Paul Finley

=== Federal office holders ===
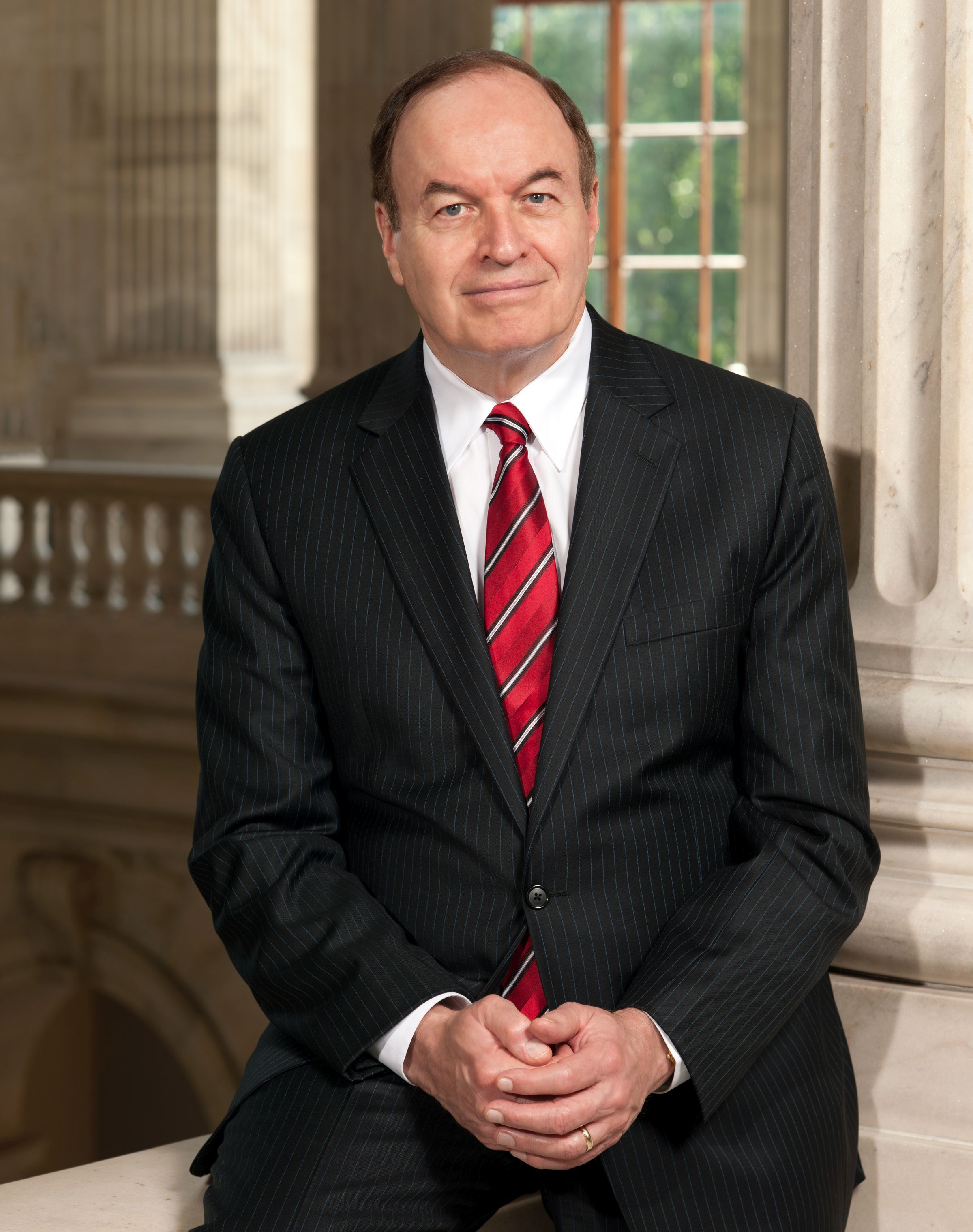
Richard Shelby

- U.S. Senator from Alabama: Richard Shelby (Republican)
- U.S. Senator from Alabama: Doug Jones (Democratic) / Tommy Tuberville (Republican) (from January 3, 2021)
- House District 1: Bradley Byrne (Republican) / Jerry Carl (Republican) (from January 3, 2021)
- House District 2: Martha Roby (Republican) / Barry Moore (Republican) (from January 3, 2021)
- House District 3: Mike Rogers (Republican)
- House District 4: Robert Aderholt (Republican)
- House District 5: Mo Brooks (Republican)
- House District 6: Gary Palmer (Republican)
- House District 7: Terri Sewell (Democratic)

== Population ==
In the 2020 United States census, Alabama had a population of 5,024,279.

The state's largest cities, based on the 2020 census, were as follows:

Rank	City	County	Population
1	Huntsville	Madison, Limestone, Morgan	215,006
2	Birmingham	Jefferson, Shelby	200,733
3	Montgomery	Montgomery	200,603
4	Mobile	Mobile	187,041
5	Tuscaloosa	Tuscaloosa	99,600
6	Hoover	Jefferson / Shelby	92,606
7	Auburn	Lee	76,143
8	Dothan	Houston, Dale, Henry	71,072
9	Decatur	Morgan, Limestone	57,938
10	Madison	Madison / Limestone	56,933

== Sports ==
=== American football ===
- 2020 Alabama Crimson Tide football team – Under head coach Nick Saban, Alabama competed in the 2020 college football season.
- 2020 Auburn Tigers football team – Under head coach Gus Malzahn, Auburn competed in the 2020 college football season.
- 2020 UAB Blazers football team – UAB competed in the 2020 season under head coach Bill Clark.
- 2020 Troy Trojans football team – Troy competed in the 2020 season under head coach Chip Lindsey.
- 2020 South Alabama Jaguars football team – South Alabama competed in the 2020 season under head coach Steve Campbell.

=== Basketball ===
- 2019–20 Alabama Crimson Tide men's basketball team – Alabama completed the 2019–20 season under head coach Nate Oats.
- 2019–20 Auburn Tigers men's basketball team – Auburn completed the 2019–20 season under head coach Bruce Pearl.
- 2019–20 UAB Blazers men's basketball team – UAB completed the 2019–20 season.
- 2019–20 Alabama Crimson Tide women's basketball team – Alabama completed the 2019–20 season.
- 2019–20 Auburn Tigers women's basketball team – Auburn completed the 2019–20 season.

=== Baseball ===
- 2020 Alabama Crimson Tide baseball team – Alabama competed in the 2020 NCAA baseball season.
- 2020 Auburn Tigers baseball team – Auburn competed in the 2020 NCAA baseball season.
- 2020 UAB Blazers baseball team – UAB competed in the 2020 NCAA baseball season.
- 2020 Birmingham Barons season – The Birmingham Barons played in the Double-A Southern League.

== Chronology of events ==
=== January ===
- Add Alabama-specific January events here.

=== February ===
- Add Alabama-specific February events here.

=== March ===
- Add Alabama-specific March events here.

=== April ===
- Add Alabama-specific April events here.

=== May ===
- Add Alabama-specific May events here.

=== June ===
- Add Alabama-specific June events here.

=== July ===
- Add Alabama-specific July events here.

=== August ===
- Add Alabama-specific August events here.

=== September ===
- Add Alabama-specific September events here.

=== October ===
- Add Alabama-specific October events here.

=== November ===
- Add Alabama-specific November events here.

=== December ===
- Add Alabama-specific December events here.

== See also ==
- 2020 in the United States
