= Tuggle =

Tuggle is a surname. Notable people with the surname include:

- Anthony Tuggle (born 1963), American football player
- Brett Tuggle (1951–2022), American singer-songwriter
- Carrie A. Tuggle (1858–1924), African-American educator, philanthropist and social activist
- De'Montre Tuggle (born 1999), American football player
- Jessie Tuggle (born 1965), American football player
- John Tuggle (1961–1986), American football player
- Justin Tuggle (born 1990), American-Canadian football player
- Kenneth H. Tuggle (1904–1978), American politician
- Mark Tuggle, American politician
- Richard Tuggle (born 1948), American film director and screenwriter
- Robert Tuggle (1932–2016), American music writer
