= 1943 in Alabama =

- Decades: 1920s; 1930s; 1940s; 1950s; 1960s
- See also: History of Alabama; Historical outline of Alabama; List of years in Alabama; 1943 in the United States

Events from the year 1943 in Alabama

== Events ==
May 11 – The Ink Spots headlined a concert at Municipal Auditorium.

May 25 – riots break out at the Alabama Dry Dock Shipping Company after 12 African Americans were promoted at their job.

August 28 – a mine explosion in Jefferson County kills 24 people.

== Births ==
- Dewey “Spooner” Oldham Jr, June 14, 1943 – songwriter
- Sam Frazier Jr, August 12, 1943 – harmonica player
- Henry Victor Gaston, January 15, 1943 – politician

== Deaths ==
- Thomas Kilby, October 22, 1943 – politician
- Charles S McDowell, May 22, 1943 – politician
