= 2022 in Alabama =

- Decades: 2000s; 2010s; 2020s
- See also: History of Alabama; Historical outline of Alabama; List of years in Alabama; 2022 in the United States

The following is a list of events of the year 2022 in Alabama.

== Incumbents ==
=== State government ===
- Governor: Kay Ivey (R)

== Events ==
- The Constitution of Alabama is adopted as Alabama's seventh state constitution.
- January 10 – 2022 College Football Playoff National Championship: In American football, Georgia defeats Alabama to win the national championship.
- June 16 – Three people are killed in a shooting at an Episcopal Church in Vestavia Hills.

== See also ==
- 2022 in the United States
