= 2024 in Alabama =

- Decades: 2000s; 2010s; 2020s
- See also: History of Alabama; Historical outline of Alabama; List of years in Alabama; 2024 in the United States

The following is a list of events of the year 2024 in Alabama.

== Incumbents ==
=== State government ===
- Governor: Kay Ivey (R)

== Events ==
- January 25 – The state of Alabama executes convicted murderer Kenneth Smith using nitrogen hypoxia, the first time the technique is used.
- February 17 – Four people are killed in a shooting at a car wash in Birmingham.
- February 21 – The Supreme Court of the U.S. state of Alabama rules that frozen embryos in test tubes are legally considered children.
- March 5 –
  - The Democratic Party holds presidential nominating contests in Alabama.
  - The Republican Party holds presidential nominating contests in Alabama.
- May 30 – The United States Department of Labor files a lawsuit against Hyundai Motors over illegal use of child labor at the company's automobile factory in Montgomery, amid a nationwide increase in child labor in the U.S.
- May 31 – Birmingham-Southern College permanently closes. Despite this, the school's baseball team continues playing in the 2024 NCAA Division III baseball tournament until losing to the University of Wisconsin–Whitewater on June 2.
- July 13 – Four people are killed and nine injured after a mass shooting at a nightclub in Birmingham.
- July 18 – Five people, a mother and four children, are killed in a mass shooting near West Blocton.
- September 21 – September 2024 Birmingham shooting: Four people are killed and seventeen others are injured following a mass shooting in Birmingham.
- September 26 – Alabama executes a man via inert gas asphyxiation using nitrogen in the country's second ever execution by this method.
- November 10 – Tuskegee University shooting: 1 person is killed and 16 others are injured in a school shooting during Homecoming weekend at Tuskegee University.

== See also ==
- 2024 in the United States
