= 1923 in Alabama =

- Decades: 1900s; 1910s; 1920s; 1930s; 1940s
- See also: History of Alabama; Historical outline of Alabama; List of years in Alabama; 1923 in the United States

Events from 1923 in Alabama

== Office holders ==
=== State office holders ===
- Governor of Alabama: William W. Brandon (Democrat)
- Lieutenant Governor of Alabama: Charles S. McDowell (Democrat)
- Alabama Attorney General: Harwell G. Davis
- Alabama Secretary of State: William Peyton Cobb (Democrat), Sidney H. Blan (Democrat)
- Speaker of the Alabama House of Representatives: Hugh D. Merrill (Democrat)
- Chief Justice, Alabama Supreme Court: John R. Tyson, J. Lister Hill

=== Mayors of major cities ===
- Mayor of Huntsville: Fraser L. Adams
- Mayor of Birmingham: David E. McClendon
- Mayor of Montgomery: William A. Gunter, Jr.
- Mayor of Mobile: Richard V. Taylor
- Mayor of Auburn: C. S. Yarbrough

=== Federal office holders ===
- U.S. senator from Alabama: Oscar Underwood (Democrat)
- U.S. senator from Alabama: J. Thomas Heflin (Democrat)
- House District 1: John McDuffie (Democrat)
- House District 2: William B. Bowling (Democrat)
- House District 3: Henry B. Steagall (Democrat)
- House District 4: Lamar Jeffers (Democrat)
- House District 5: Miles C. Allgood (Democrat)
- House District 6: William B. Bankhead (Democrat)
- House District 7: John L. Burnett (Democrat)
- House District 8: Edward B. Almon (Democrat)
- House District 9: George Huddleston (Democrat)
- House District 10: William R. Wood (Democrat)

== Population ==
In the 1920 United States census, Alabama was recorded as having a population of 2,348,174, ranking as the 18th most populous state in the country. By 1930, Alabama's population had grown 12.7% to 2,646,248.
