= 2025 in Alabama =

- Decades: 2000s; 2010s; 2020s
- See also: History of Alabama; Historical outline of Alabama; List of years in Alabama; 2025 in the United States

The following is a list of events of the year 2025 in Alabama.

== Incumbents ==
=== State government ===
- Governor: Kay Ivey (R)

== Events ==
- February 5 - The Alabama House Judiciary Committee approves proposed legislation by Matt Simpson. The legislation is a Death penalty bill for child rapists, that could ultimately challenge the precedent of Kennedy v. Louisiana. The bill is similar to the laws passed in Florida (2023) and Tennessee (2024).
- February 11 - The Alabama House of Representatives passes a bill (86-5) expanding the death penalty for child rapists.
- June 24 – 2025 Alabama Senate District 5 special election: Republican Matt Woods wins election to the Alabama Senate from the 5th district.
- July 4 – Four people are shot to death in an apartment in Talladega.
- July 23 – Seven people are charged in connection with a suspected child sex-trafficking ring based out of a bunker in Brent. Ten children, ages ranging from 3 to 15, are taken into state custody.
- August 26 – 2025 Birmingham, Alabama mayoral election: Incumbent Mayor Randall Woodfin wins reelection.
- August 30 – Two adults are killed and seven children are injured after an ATV accident at a park in Piedmont.
- September 2 – Trump announces the Space Operations Command headquarters will be moved from Colorado Springs, Colorado, to Huntsville.
- September 26 – Parts of Alabama, Louisiana, and Mississippi experience 911 outages. AT&T reports the outages were caused by fiber cuts made by "third-parties".
- October 4 – Two people are killed and 12 injured in a shooting in Montgomery. The police chief says the shooting stemmed from a disagreement that resulted in a shoot-out.
- November 22 – Two University of Alabama at Birmingham football players are stabbed at the Football Operations Building. Another UAB player is arrested. A home game against the University of South Florida later that day is played as scheduled, which UAB loses 48–18.
- December 1 – The University of Alabama suspends two student-run magazines—a women's lifestyle magazine and a magazine for Black students—saying they violate anti-DEI policies.

== See also ==
- 2025 in the United States
