= Graefenberg Medical Institute =

American medical school

- Active: 1852–1861
- Founder: Philip Madison Shepard
- Location: Dadeville, Alabama, U.S.

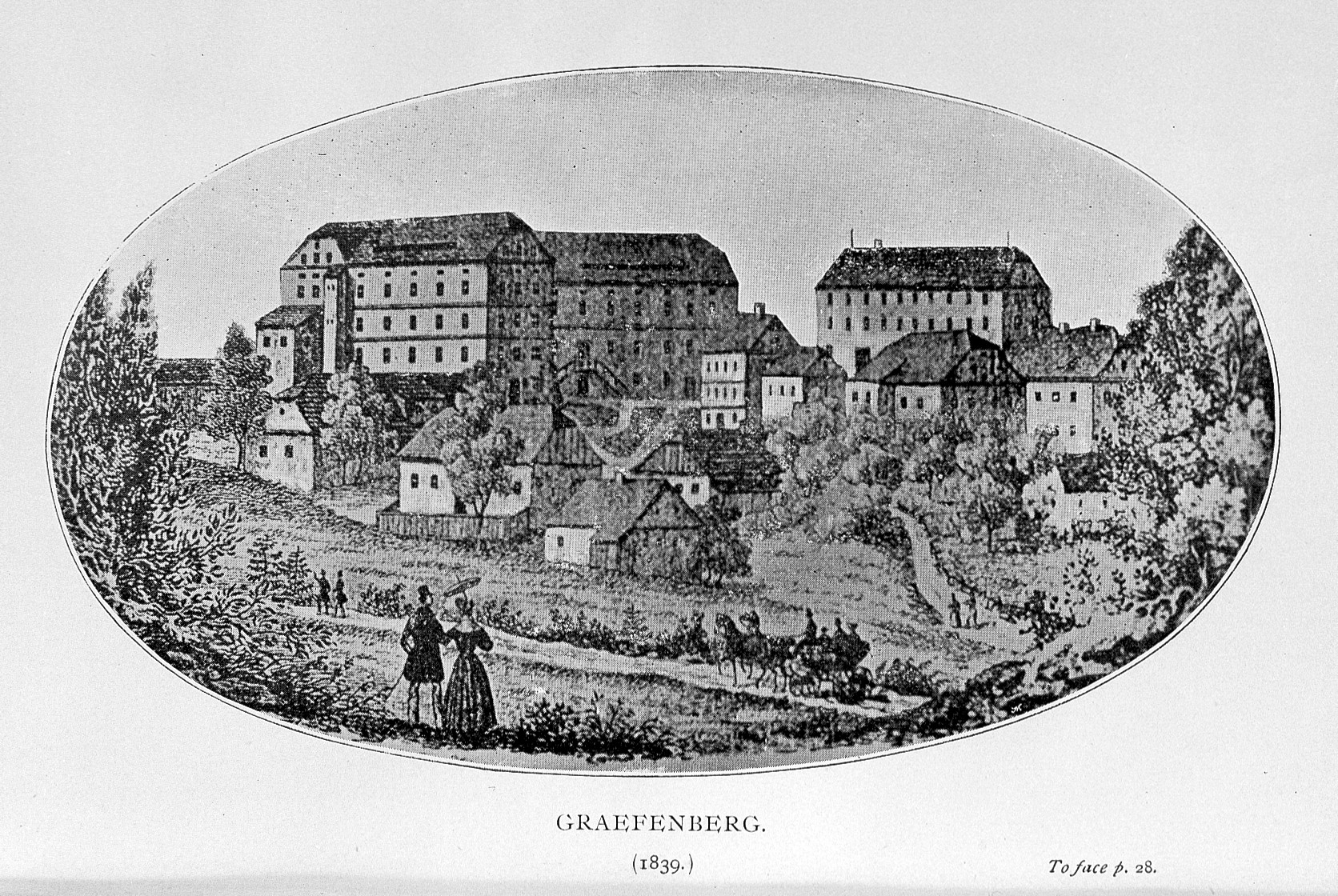
Graefenberg in Austria

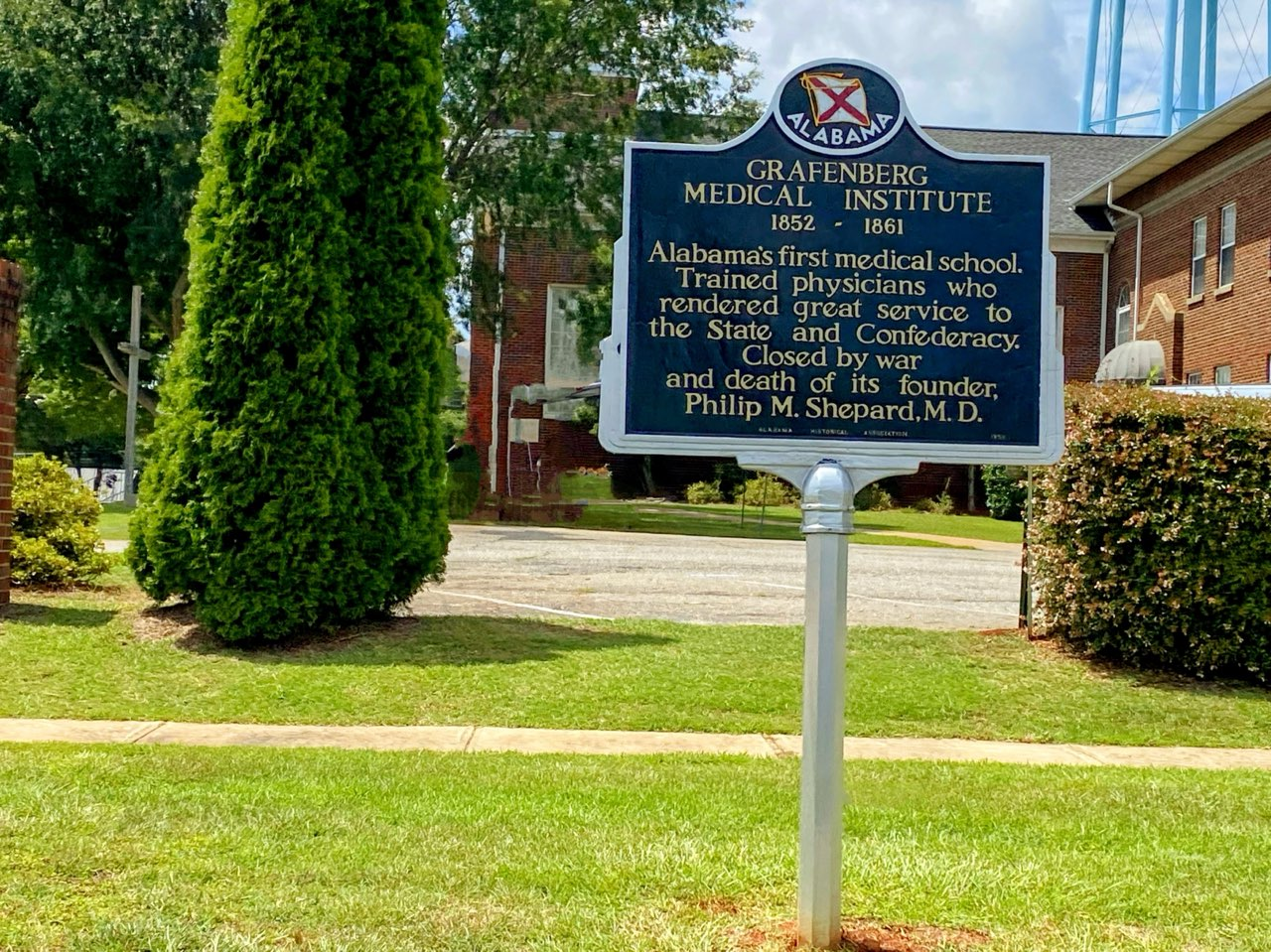
Graefenberg Medical Institute

Graefenberg Medical Institute was Alabama's first medical school, established in Dadeville, Tallapoosa, Alabama in 1852. It was the brainchild of Dr. Philip Madison Shepard, who drew inspiration from a similar medical institute in Austria. Dr. Shepard's announcement of the school's opening in local newspapers in August and September 1851 marked a significant milestone in Alabama's medical education history.

The institute operated with two sessions per year, each lasting approximately four to five months, offering a flexible admission policy. Completing just one session was sufficient for graduation, reflecting the institute's progressive approach. It was equipped with a library, pharmacy, anatomical laboratory, classrooms, and an auditorium. The three-story building, situated on the public road to Dudleyville, served as a hub for instruction, housing, and cadaver storage, creating a rich and comprehensive educational environment. The institute's location was not just a geographical detail but a testament to its pioneering role. It was the first functioning medical school chartered by the Alabama legislature, leaving a mark on medical education in the region. The school had about 50 graduates; at least five were Dr. Shepard's children. The last session recorded was held in 1860. The closure of the institute had a significant impact on the medical education landscape in Alabama, leading to the establishment of new medical schools and the adoption of new educational approaches. The school burnt down in 1873, along with all of its records.
