= Wilson Fallin =

American historian and professor emeritus at the University of Montevallo

Wilson Fallin Jr. (born c. 1942) is an American historian and professor emeritus at the University of Montevallo in Montevallo, Alabama. He specializes in African American history and the history of Alabama. Fallin met Martin Luther King Jr., where King had spoken at Fallin's Baptist church in Bessemer, Alabama.
