= Mark Barnes =

American attorney

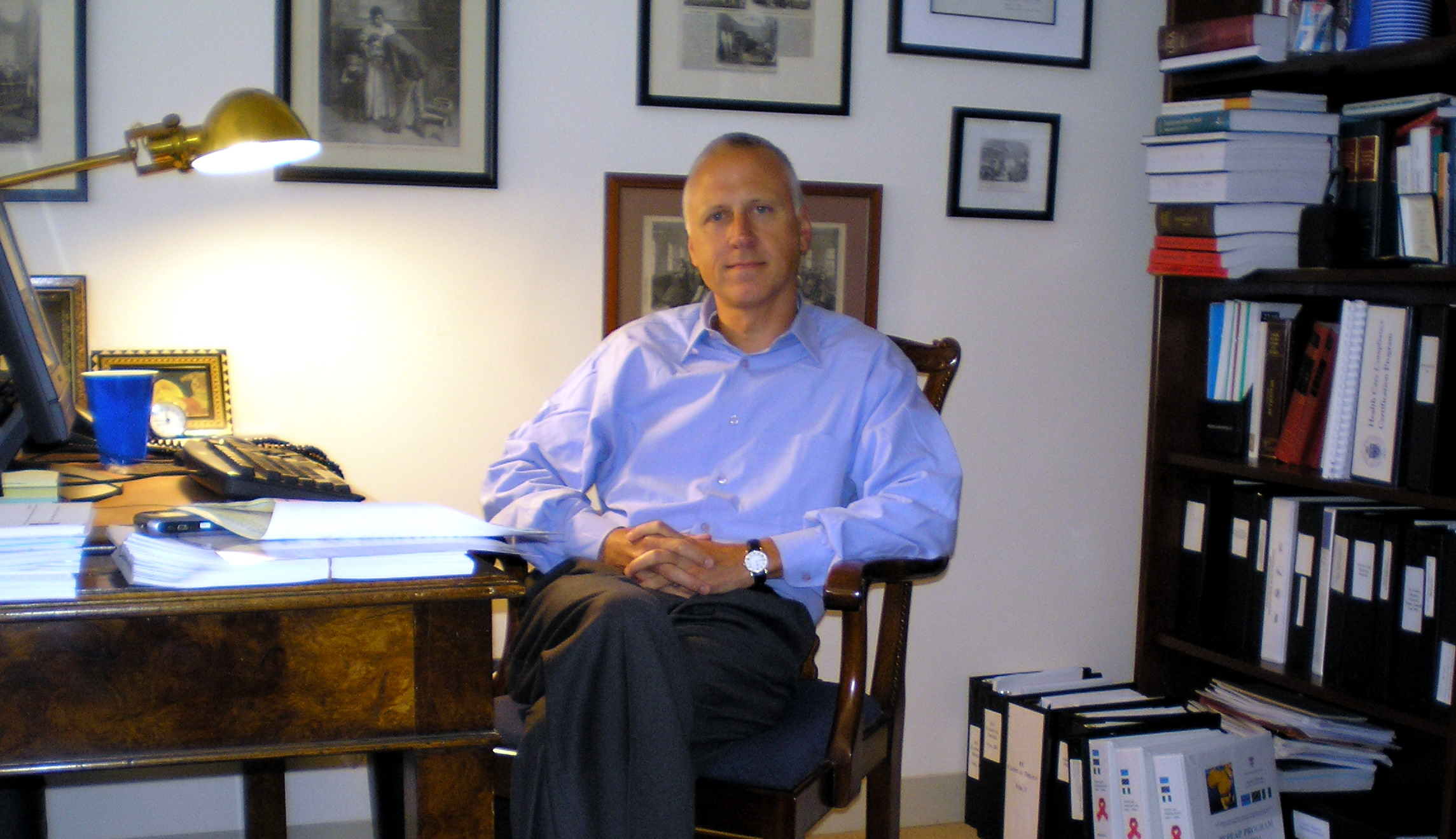
Mark Barnes

Mark Barnes is an American attorney serving as a partner in the Ropes & Gray health care and life sciences practice based in Boston. He was director of policy for the New York State Department of Health AIDS Institute, and associate commissioner for medical and legal policy for the New York City Department of Health under the mayoralty of David Dinkins. He worked on the National Health Care Reform Task Force in the Clinton Administration. He also has served as executive vice president of St. Jude Children's Research Hospital and founded and directed the Harvard University HIV/AIDS treatment programs in Africa. His current legal and advocacy work includes a focus on the fields of research compliance, the ethics and regulation of clinical trials, medical privacy, and "big data" research. He is past president of the New York State Bar Association's Health Law Section.

== Personal ==
Barnes is a native of Dadeville, Tallapoosa County, Alabama. He is the son of Elaine Robinson and Mike Barnes, and his family has lived around Tallapoosa for generations. According to his family oral history, he is a direct descendant of Daniel Boone. Barnes plans to retire to Dadeville, where he purchased family property. He has been with his partner since 1984.

Barnes attended Bennington College. In 1984 Barnes graduated from Yale Law School with a juris doctor, and in 1991 he received his L.L.M. from Columbia University School of Law.

== Legal career ==
In 1987 first-year Columbia students expressed appreciation of Barnes.

In 1988, as an associate professor of the Columbia Law School, Barnes founded the AIDS Law Clinic. He is a faculty member at the Yale Law School and lecturer at the Yale Medical School. He has taught at several other law schools, including Harvard Law School, NYU Law School, Brooklyn Law School, Cardozo Law School, and New York Law School. He has taught courses in the ethics and law of human subjects research, healthcare law, public health, managed care law, occupational health and safety law, the regulation of narcotics, and law and medicine.

=== AIDS Law Clinic ===
Barnes and Professor Deborah Greenberg at Columbia Law School founded the first legal clinic addressing the AIDS crisis, to allow law students to represent persons living with AIDS in anti-discrimination cases. The program was funded in part by the U.S. Department of Education and received referrals from the New York City Commission on Human Rights and the State Division of Human Rights. The clinical education director at Columbia said of Barnes: "[He] is a leader in the field, and we're lucky to have him. He's highly knowledgeable, he's litigated on a precedented discrimination case, and he's sensitive to the AIDS crisis."

The clinic was praised by public health officials and by students as hands-on experience, but the school did not commit to continue it. When it did not renew Barnes' contract, students protested, and the issue was covered in the press. On April 12, 1989, 200 students protested Columbia Law School's attempts to close the "school's successful and much praised 'AIDS' legal clinic." They held a sit-in at the law school building to demand the faculty committee renew Barnes's contract for another year. "We thought one of the reasons for him not being reappointed is the lack of support for the clinic by the university," said Maya Wiley, 3L and protest organizer. Dean Barbara Black said the school supported the clinic, but declined to say why Barnes was not offered another one-year contract. Wiley said, "In all of our conversations with the powers-that-be at this school, it's been very clear to us that the clinic is in jeopardy and that there is a prevailing attitude among the powers-that-be opposed to the clinical approach." Student Matt Levine said: "We do care about Mark Barnes because he has run the clinic extremely well. But the core issue is the continuation of the AIDS clinic."

On April 19, co-founder Deborah Green announced the school would keep the clinic open. On June 28, 1989, the Columbia Spectator reported that Barnes was reappointed and promoted from clinic advisor to the assistant clinical professor of law by the faculty. "I'm gratified that the clinic will continue for an additional semester, but the challenge for the Law School is going to be the continuation of the clinic after the fall semester," said Barnes.

== Public service ==
In 1989, Barnes began working as the AIDS policy director for the New York State Department of Health, and later served as the executive director of AIDS Action Council, the primary national lobbying group focused on care and prevention of HIV/AIDS. The appointment as executive director of AIDS Action Council was criticized by an activist with ACT UP/Washington, who said that Barnes' appointment was a "commitment to mediocrity" and that a director living with AIDS should have been chosen. In 1992, while serving as the associate commissioner of the New York City Department of Health he wrote and managed the adoption of new health regulations that allowed the public health authorities to detain and treat patients with tuberculosis who had failed to take their anti-tuberculosis medications. Barnes participated in the first-ever White House Conference on HIV and AIDS on December 6, 1995. He has been a consultant for the National Commission on AIDS, the Centers for Disease Control and Prevention, the American Red Cross, and the National Minority Task Force on AIDS. In 2000, he was appointed by then-Health and Human Services Secretary Donna Shalala to the new National Human Research Protections Advisory Committee, which examined issues of ethical conduct in human medical experimentation. He later served on the HHS Secretary's Advisory Committee on Human Research Protections. In 2012 he co-founded, and continues to serve as faculty co-chair of, the Multi-Regional Clinical Trials Center of Harvard University and Brigham and Women's Hospital, a project designed to improve the planning, conduct and regulation of multi-national clinical trials, with a special emphasis on trials in the emerging economies. In 2004, he was the founding executive director of the Harvard University AIDS treatment programs in Nigeria, Tanzania and Botswana funded under the PEPFAR program.

== Recognition ==
- The Best Lawyers in America (1997–2018)
- Legal 500 (2015, 2017–2018)
- Chambers USA: America's Leading Lawyers for Business (2004–2006)
- New York Super Lawyers (2006, 2008)
- Inspiring Yale Award for the Yale Law School (2018)
- Thurgood Marshall Award for Death Penalty Advocacy, Association of the Bar of the City of New York
