= Wickles =

American food manufacturer

A selection of Wickles products

Wickles is an American food manufacturer that sells pickles, relishes and pickled peppers. The company originated in Dadeville, Alabama and is still based in Alabama. Wickles offers an original sweet and spicy pickle along with other signature products in their Wicked line, such as original relish, hula relish, hula pickles, pickled okra, pickled jalapeños and pickled banana peppers. Wickles Dirty Dill line of products is spicy, with no sweet notes, and includes cocktail cornichons, pickled okra, red jalapeño relish, crinkle cut pickle chips, spears and whole baby dills. Wickles Chill'n Dill line of products is the first no-heat flavor for the brand, with notes of dill and garlic for a bold, classic deli flavor.

The company was founded in 1998 by brothers Trey and Will Sims and a third partner Andy Anderson, using a secret 70-year-old family recipe that differentiates Wickles products from all others. A custom blend of spices and ingredients makes their products "wickedly delicious". The recipe is a family secret that until a few years ago was just used for family and friends who were lucky enough to get a jar. In 2009 Wickles products were available across the United States.

Celebrity chef Emeril Lagasse has used the Wickles pickles on hamburgers. Alabama restaurateur Bob Baumhower offers "fried Wickles" at his restaurants. Rachael Ray also featured Wickles relish in a special sauce while making her Big Smacker Daym Drop Burger.

In April 2015, Wickles original pickle was selected as winner of AL.com's Alabama Food Bracket competition. This was a run-off against 32 other products that are of Alabama origin. Wickles won 52.5 percent of the final round's 10,917 votes.
