= Ed Oliver (politician) =

American politician (born 1955/56)

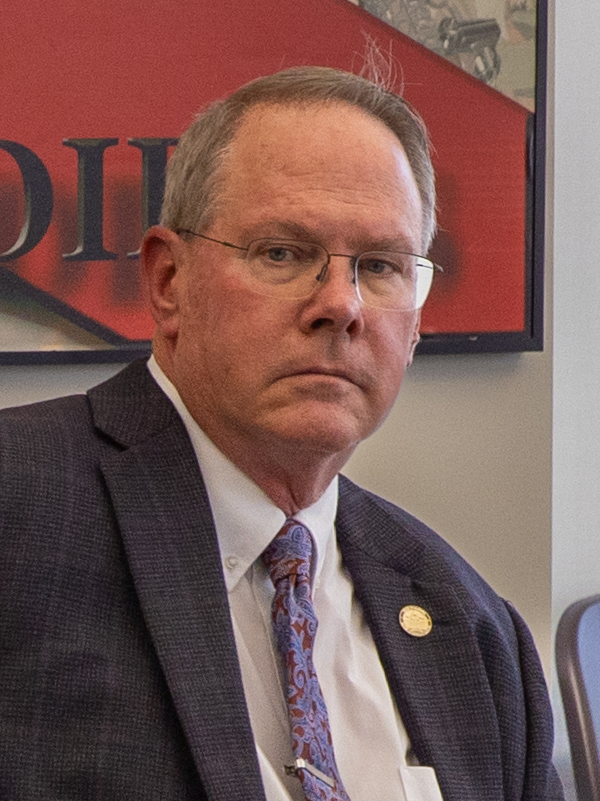

Member of the Alabama House of Representatives from the 81st district
- Incumbent
- Assumed office November 7, 2018
- Preceded by: Mark Tuggle

Personal details
- Born: 1955–1956 Dadeville, Alabama, U.S.
- Party: Republican
- Profession: Pilot

Edward Banks Oliver (born 1955–1956) is an American politician who has served as a member of the Alabama House of Representatives from the 81st district serving since 2018. He is a member of the Republican Party.

== Biography ==
Oliver, a native of Dadeville, Alabama, graduated from Dadeville High School in 1974. He then graduated from the University of Alabama in 1979. Before being elected to the Alabama House of Representatives, Oliver served as an aviator in the United States Army and worked as an air ambulance helicopter pilot.

After retiring from air service, Oliver first ran for the Alabama House of Representatives in 2018, in the Republican primary for the 81st district. He advanced to a runoff against Terry Martin, which he won. Oliver faced Democratic nominee Jeremy Jeffcoat in the general election, Oliver campaigned on industrial development and economic growth, as well as education. Oliver won against Jeffcoat in the November general election and was sworn in as state representative.
