= Mark Tuggle =

American politician

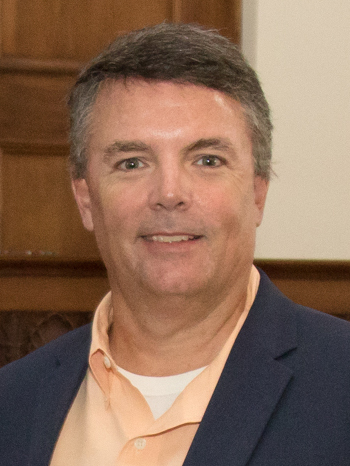
- Tuggle in 2017

Member of the Alabama House of Representatives from the 81st district
- In office November 3, 2010 – November 7, 2018
- Preceded by: Betty Carol Graham
- Succeeded by: Ed Oliver

Personal details
- Party: Republican

Mark Tuggle is an American politician who served in the Alabama House of Representatives from the 81st district from 2010 to 2018.
