= Alabama Territory =

Territory of the US 1817-1819

Coordinates: 32°39′N 86°48′W

Territory of Alabama
- Organized incorporated territory of United States
- 1817–1819
- Flag

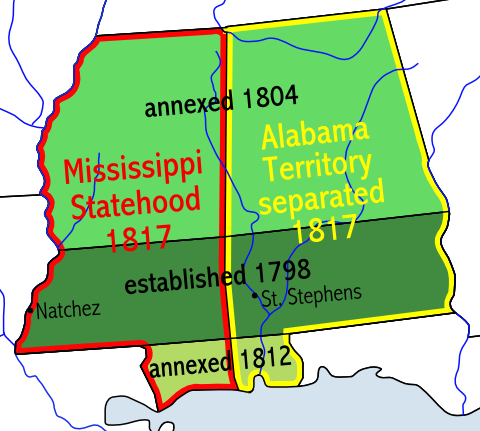
- Capital: St. Stephens
- Government
  - Type: Organized incorporated territory
- Governor
  - 1817–1819: William Wyatt Bibb
- History
  - Established: December 10, 1817 1817
  - Statehood: December 14, 1819 1819
| Preceded by | Succeeded by |
| Mississippi Territory | Alabama |

The Territory of Alabama (sometimes Alabama Territory) was an organized incorporated territory of the United States. The Alabama Territory was carved from the Mississippi Territory on August 15, 1817 and lasted until December 14, 1819, when it was admitted to the Union as the twenty-second state.

== History ==
The Alabama Territory^{[n]} was designated by two interdependent Acts of the Congress of the United States, passed by both chambers, the Senate and the House of Representatives on March 1 and 3, 1817, but it did not become effective until October 10, 1817. The delay was due to a provision in the Congressional Organic Act passed in Washington, which stated that the act would only take effect if and when the western part of the Mississippi Territory (1798–1817) were to form a state constitution and government on the road to statehood. A state constitution for Mississippi was drawn up and adopted by Mississippian delegates on August 15, 1817, elections were held the next month in September, and the first legislative session convened in October, with the western part of the Mississippi Territory existing since 1798 becoming the State of Mississippi on December 10, 1817.

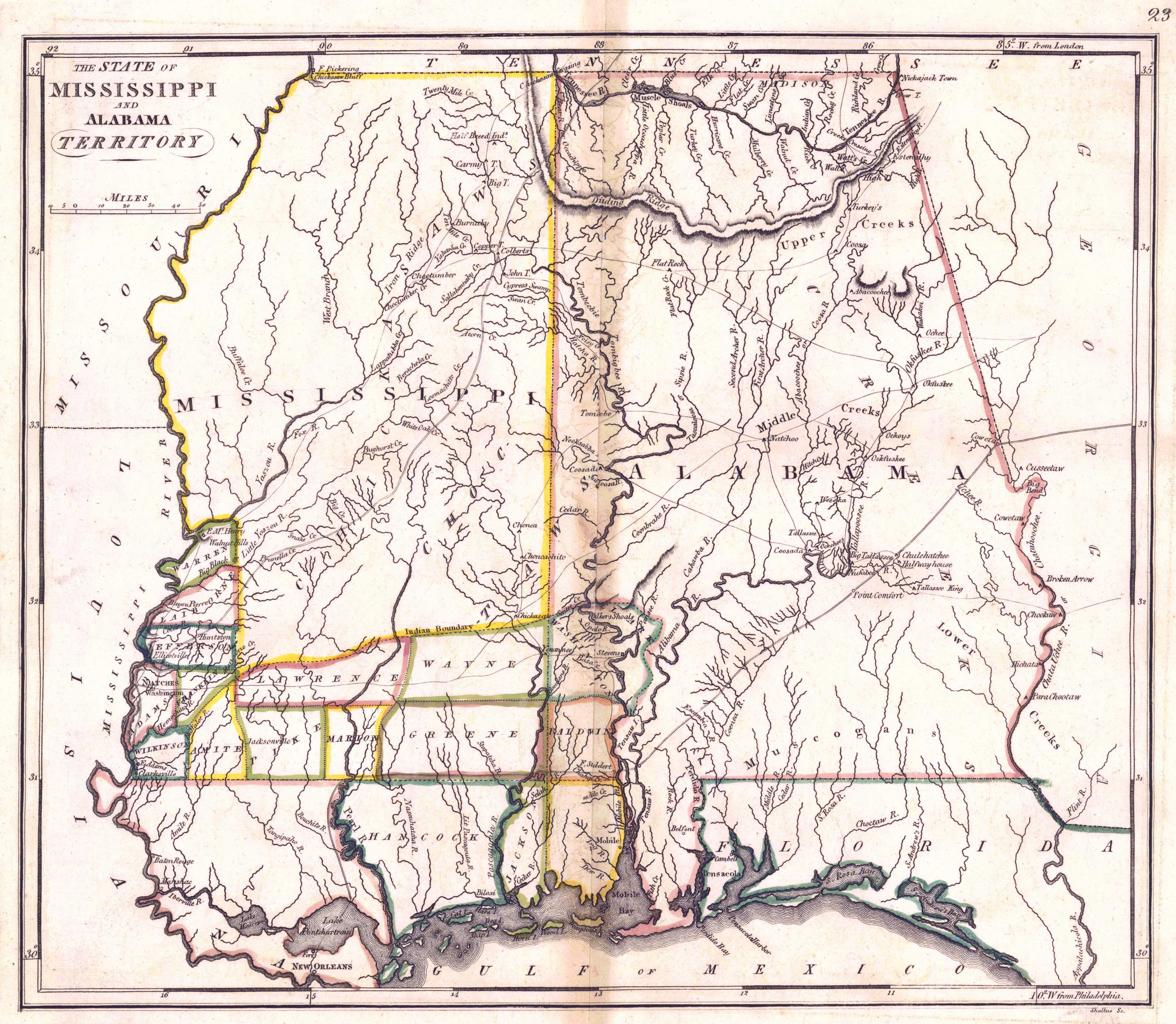
1817 era map of the former Mississippi Territory (1798-1817), of the southwestern United States, showing the new U.S. state of Mississippi (to the west / left), and adjacent remaining Alabama Territory (on the east / right). At the bottom / south is the western panhandle of Spanish Florida and West Florida along the southern coast of the Gulf of Mexico, part of the American purchase of the future Florida Territory in 1819 and subsequent state of Florida by 1845.

St. Stephens, located in the central area of the Alabama Territory on the Tombigbee River, was the only territorial capital during the period. William Wyatt Bibb (1781–1820), formerly of Georgia was the only territorial governor, later elected to that position after achieving statehood.

On December 14, 1819, Alabama was admitted to the federal Union as the 22nd state, with appointed territorial governor William W. Bibb (1781-1820), formerly of Georgia, becoming the elected first state governor (1819–1820).

== Territorial evolution of Alabama ==
- Territories of the Kingdom of Spain and its worldwide Spanish Empire that would later become part of the future territories of Alabama:
  - La Florida (Spanish Florida), 1565–1763
  - Florida Occidental (West Florida), 1783–1821
    - Mobile District
- Possession of the Kingdom of Great Britain since 1763, in the Treaty of Paris (1763) ending the French and Indian War (1756–1763), (known as the Seven Years' War in Europe), until 1783, with the Treaty of Paris (1783) that the lands would later be ceded to become part of the newly independent United States after 1776,
- Organized as the old Southwest Territory or Territory of the Southwest [also then occasionally known as the "Territory South of the Ohio River"] (1790–1796), then later
- Reorganized and renamed as the Mississippi Territory (1798–1817), then the
- Territory of Alabama was carved out of the eastern half in 1817 until 1819:
- West Florida, 1763–1783 (briefly possessed by Britain, acquired from Spain.
- U.S. states that ceded territorial claims that would later become part of the future State of Alabama:
  - State of South Carolina, 1787
  - State of Georgia, 1802 (sold the disputed Yazoo lands to the U.S. Federal government)
- U.S. territory with land that would later become part of the Territory of Alabama:
  - Mississippi Territory, 1798–1817
- U.S. state created from the Alabama Territory, 1817–1819:
  - State of Alabama, December 14, 1819 to present

== See also ==
- Historic regions of the United States
- History of Alabama
- Territorial evolution of the United States

== Notes ==
[n] - Name "Territory of Alabama" was often used in the time period, rather than "Alabama Territory".
