= Dadeville, Alabama =

County seat of Tallapoosa County

- City
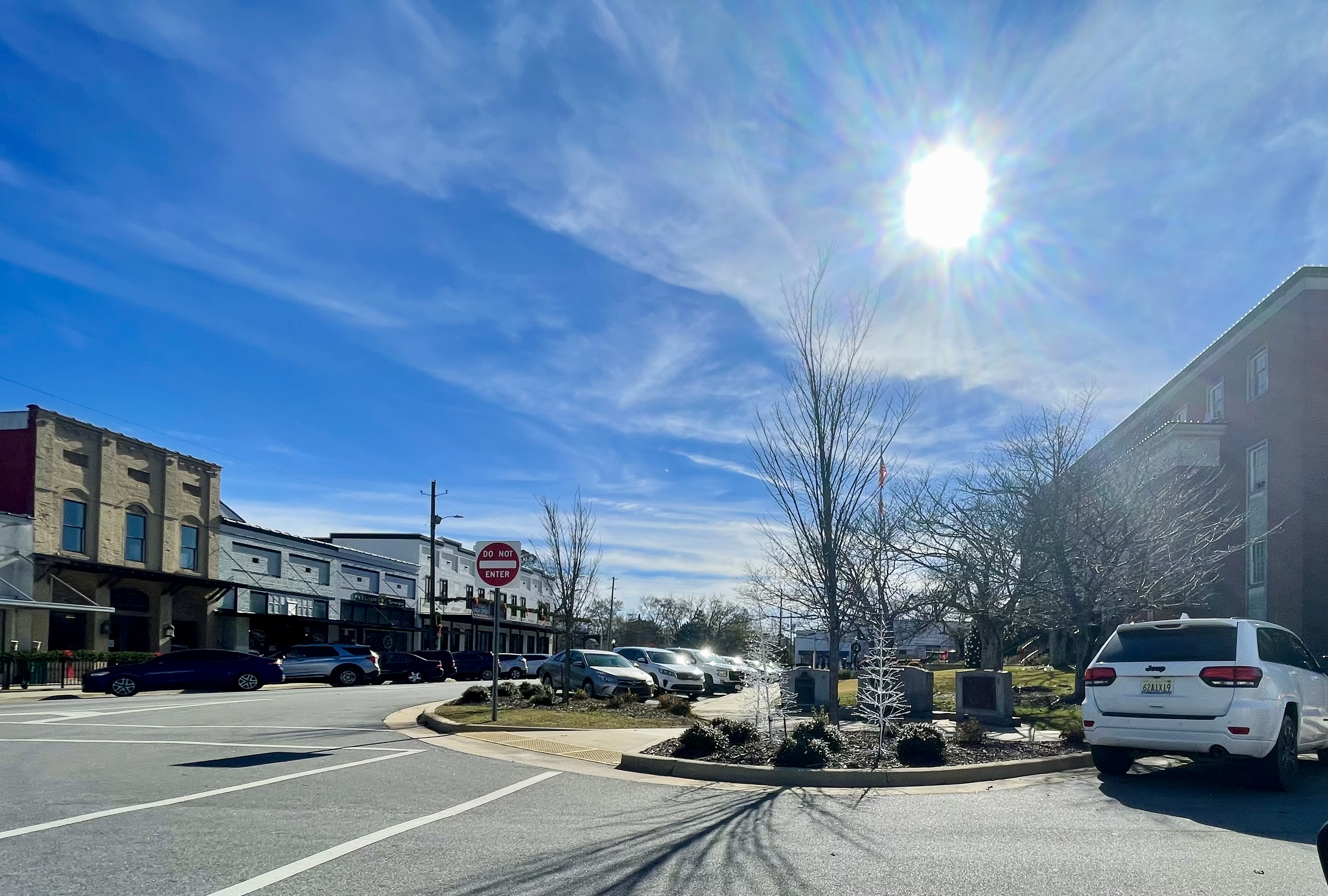
- Entering Downtown

- Logo

- Location of Dadeville in Tallapoosa County, Alabama.
- Coordinates: 32°49′36″N 85°44′38″W
- Country: United States
- State: Alabama
- County: Tallapoosa
- Named for: Francis L. Dade

Area
  - Total: 16.03 sq mi (41.51 km^{2})
  - Land: 15.94 sq mi (41.29 km^{2})
  - Water: 0.085 sq mi (0.22 km^{2})
- Elevation: 705 ft (215 m)

Population (2020)
  - Total: 3,084
  - Density: 193/sq mi (74.7/km^{2})
- Time zone: UTC−6 (Central (CST))
  - Summer (DST): UTC−5 (CDT)
- ZIP Code: 36853
- Area code: 256
- FIPS code: 01-19336
- GNIS feature ID: 2404175
- Website: www.cityofdadevilleal.org

Dadeville is a city in and the county seat of Tallapoosa County, Alabama, United States. At the 2020 census, the population was 3,084, down from 3,230 in 2000.

== History ==
Prior to its incorporation, Dadeville was an Indian trading post and a center of commerce where commodities such as cotton, lumber, tin, asbestos, and livestock were traded. The town was surveyed by John H. Broadnax in 1836, granted a charter in 1837, and first incorporated in 1858. Dadeville was named for Major Francis Langhorne Dade, who was killed in 1835 by Seminole Indians in a battle of the Second Seminole War that came to be known as the "Dade Massacre". Dade had never actually visited Tallapoosa County.

As a stagecoach stop on the Tennessee Road between Montgomery and Georgia, Dadeville was host to a stream of traders whose goods and livestock often crowded the square of the courthouse. Dadeville lost its charter during the Civil War, and was incorporated a second time in 1878. Dadeville has been the Tallapoosa County seat since 1838.

Dadeville was home to the Graefenberg Medical Institute, Alabama's first medical school, which operated from 1852 until the outbreak of the Civil War. Attempts to revive the school after the war failed, and the building burned in 1873.

The completion of the Martin Dam on the Tallapoosa River in 1926 and the subsequent creation of Lake Martin had and continues to have a strong economic impact on Dadeville.

On April 15, 2023, four people were killed and 32 others were injured in a mass shooting at a party. Most of the victims were teenagers.

== Geography ==
According to the U.S. Census Bureau, the city has a total area of 16.0 square miles (41 km^{2}), all land.

The city is located in the east central part of the state along U.S. Route 280, which runs through the northern part of the city. It leads northwest 15 mi (24 km) to Alexander City and southeast 28 mi (45 km) to Opelika. Birmingham is 85 mi (137 km) northwest via US 280. Alabama State Route 49 also runs through the city from north to south, leading north 18 mi (29 km) to New Site and south 18 mi (29 km) to Reeltown.

=== Climate ===
The climate in this area is characterized by hot, humid summers and generally mild to cool winters. According to the Köppen climate classification system, Dadeville has a humid subtropical climate, abbreviated "Cfa" on climate maps.

== Demographics ==
Historical population
Census	Pop.	Note	%±
1880	740		—
1890	873		18.0%
1900	1,136		30.1%
1910	1,193		5.0%
1920	1,146		−3.9%
1930	1,549		35.2%
1940	2,025		30.7%
1950	2,354		16.2%
1960	2,940		24.9%
1970	2,847		−3.2%
1980	3,263		14.6%
1990	3,276		0.4%
2000	3,212		−2.0%
2010	3,230		0.6%
2020	3,084		−4.5%
U.S. Decennial Census; 2013 Estimate

=== Racial and ethnic composition ===
Dadeville city, Alabama – Racial and ethnic composition Note: the US Census treats Hispanic/Latino as an ethnic category. This table excludes Latinos from the racial categories and assigns them to a separate category. Hispanics/Latinos may be of any race.
Race / Ethnicity (NH = Non-Hispanic)	Pop 1980	Pop 1990	Pop 2000	Pop 2010	Pop 2020	% 1980	% 1990	% 2000	% 2010	% 2020
White alone (NH)	1,977	2,006	1,700	1,608	1,573	60.59%	61.23%	52.93%	49.78%	51.01%
Black or African American alone (NH)	1,165	1,257	1,443	1,531	1,363	35.70%	38.37%	44.93%	47.40%	44.20%
Native American or Alaska Native alone (NH)	0	2	8	10	11	0.00%	0.06%	0.25%	0.31%	0.36%
Asian alone (NH)	0	3	9	20	10	0.00%	0.09%	0.28%	0.62%	0.32%
Native Hawaiian or Pacific Islander alone (NH)	x	x	0	0	0	x	x	0.00%	0.00%	0.00%
Other race alone (NH)	0	0	1	1	12	0.00%	0.00%	0.03%	0.03%	0.39%
Mixed race or Multiracial (NH)	x	x	25	31	74	x	x	0.78%	0.96%	2.40%
Hispanic or Latino (any race)	121	8	26	29	41	3.71%	0.24%	0.81%	0.90%	1.33%
Total	3,263	3,276	3,212	3,230	3,084	100.00%	100.00%	100.00%	100.00%	100.00%

=== 2020 census ===
As of the 2020 census, there were 3,084 people, 1,213 households, and 677 families residing in the city.

The median age was 45.3 years. 20.2% of residents were under the age of 18 and 21.2% of residents were 65 years of age or older. For every 100 females there were 88.6 males, and for every 100 females age 18 and over there were 87.2 males age 18 and over.

0.0% of residents lived in urban areas, while 100.0% lived in rural areas.

There were 1,213 households in Dadeville, of which 28.7% had children under the age of 18 living in them. Of all households, 34.6% were married-couple households, 18.1% were households with a male householder and no spouse or partner present, and 41.1% were households with a female householder and no spouse or partner present. About 33.1% of all households were made up of individuals and 16.9% had someone living alone who was 65 years of age or older.

There were 1,379 housing units, of which 12.0% were vacant. The homeowner vacancy rate was 2.2% and the rental vacancy rate was 5.7%.

=== 2010 census ===
At the 2010 census, there were 3,230 people, 1,217 households, and 807 families living in the city. The population density was 201.9 inhabitants per square mile (78.0/km^{2}). There were 1,402 housing units at an average density of 87.6 per square mile (33.8/km^{2}). The racial makeup of the city was 50.2% White, 47.5% Black or African American, 0.3% Native American, 0.6% Asian, 0.3% from other races, and 1.1% from two or more races. 0.9% of the population were Hispanic or Latino of any race. Of the 1,217 households 27.6% had children under the age of 18 living with them, 38.5% were married couples living together, 23.3% had a female householder with no husband present, and 33.7% were non-families. 30.6% of households were one person and 13.2% were one person aged 65 or older. The average household size was 2.45 and the average family size was 3.05.

The age distribution was 22.9% under the age of 18, 9.6% from 18 to 24, 23.9% from 25 to 44, 27.0% from 45 to 64, and 16.6% 65 or older. The median age was 39.9 years. For every 100 females, there were 88.4 males. For every 100 females age 18 and over, there were 94.5 males.

The median household income was $35,319 and the median family income was $38,824. Males had a median income of $32,031 versus $24,965 for females. The per capita income for the city was $15,923. About 16.9% of families and 19.4% of the population were below the poverty line, including 27.9% of those under age 18 and 15.2% of those age 65 or over.

=== 2000 census ===
At the 2000 census, there were 3,212 people, 1,122 households, and 813 families living in the city. The population density was 200.7 inhabitants per square mile (77.5/km^{2}). There were 1,278 housing units at an average density of 79.9 per square mile (30.8/km^{2}). The racial makeup of the city was 53.2% White, 45.1% Black or African American, 0.3% Native American, 0.3% Asian, 0.4% from other races, and 0.8% from two or more races. 0.8% of the population were Hispanic or Latino of any race. Of the 1,122 households 34.9% had children under the age of 18 living with them, 45.2% were married couples living together, 22.9% had a female householder with no husband present, and 27.5% were non-families. 24.8% of households were one person and 10.5% were one person aged 65 or older. The average household size was 2.57 and the average family size was 3.05.

The age distribution was 25.4% under the age of 18, 8.7% from 18 to 24, 26.7% from 25 to 44, 20.5% from 45 to 64, and 18.7% 65 or older. The median age was 38 years. For every 100 females, there were 85.3 males. For every 100 females age 18 and over, there were 81.0 males.

The median household income was $25,266 and the median family income was $31,512. Males had a median income of $24,500 versus $20,781 for females. The per capita income for the city was $14,178. About 18.1% of families and 19.3% of the population were below the poverty line, including 25.6% of those under age 18 and 21.7% of those age 65 or over.

== Economy ==
Wickles is a business in Dadeville that sells pickles, relishes and pickled peppers.

== Education ==
Dadeville is home to Dadeville Elementary School and Dadeville High School serving grades 7–12. Anfernee Jennings and Ed Oliver are alumni.

== Notable people ==
- Mark Barnes, New York attorney
- Robert E. Burke, U.S. Representative from Texas from 1897 to 1901
- Charles Allen Culberson, 21st Governor of Texas; U.S. Senator from Texas.
- Thomas W. Herren, Lieutenant General, U.S. Army, World War II and Korean War
- Johnson J. Hooper, author who lived in Dadeville while serving as circuit solicitor
- Anfernee Jennings, football player for the New England Patriots and University of Alabama.
- Andrew R. Johnson (1856–1933), Louisiana state senator and mayor of Homer in the 1910s; was born in Dadeville.
- J. Frank Norris, fundamentalist pastor in Texas. Norris was born in Dadeville in 1877.
- Ed Oliver, state legislator
- Lilius Bratton Rainey, U.S. Representative from Alabama from 1919 to 1923
- Olive Stone, sociologist
- Hoyt Winslett, former collegiate football player
