= Sustainability at American colleges and universities =

Sustainability Diagram

"Sustainability," was defined as “development which implies meeting the needs of the present without compromising the ability of future generations to meet their own needs”as defined by the 1983 Brundtland Commission (formally the World Commission on Environment and Development (WCED)). As sustainability gains support and momentum worldwide, universities across the United States have expanded initiatives towards more sustainable campuses, commitments, academic offerings, and student engagement.

In the past several decades, drastic changes in higher education administration, resource efficiency, food, recycling, and student projects have sprung up in colleges and universities of all types and sizes. In the U.S., the Association for the Advancement of Sustainability in Higher Education (AASHE) serves as the primary professional organization and resource hub for these universities.

American College & University Presidents' Climate Commitment (ACUPCC) is an effort for colleges and universities to collaboratively address global climate change by making institutional commitments to reduce net campus greenhouse gas emissions and promote the research and educational efforts of higher education to prepare society to re-stabilize the earth's climate. Today, the ACUPCC lives on in Second Nature's Presidents' Leadership Climate Commitments and the Climate Leadership Network.

There were many early leaders in college and university sustainability efforts, including:

- Oberlin College in Ohio had the first Leadership in Energy and Environmental Design (LEED) Gold certified music facility and Carnegie Mellon University had the first LEED dorm (Silver).
- Yale University in New Haven, Connecticut pledged that all new buildings would meet these same Gold standards.
- Princeton and Ohio University have both made strides toward cutting yearly carbon emissions on campus.
- Florida Gulf Coast University has implemented solar energy throughout various buildings.
- A number of universities across the U.S. have created bicycle rental stations for students and employees to help reduce greenhouse gas emissions from automobile traffic while helping reduce roadway congestion as well.

College and university sustainability efforts can provide these higher education institutions moral and ethical fulfillment alongside financial, environmental, social, and community benefits. Likewise, these universities are responsible for training future generations in sustainable practice, with an increasing number of formal certificate, minor, and major offerings. By providing undergraduate and graduate students more options focused at the nexus of equity, environment, and economics, higher education is providing more systems thinking and approaches as part of the educational and campus experience, helping ensure the responsible stewardship of land, resources, and communities for generations to come.

2022 study has concluded that universities can play a key role in regional and global agendas with their contribution through the incorporation of sustainability strategies, since universities "can not only achieve carbon neutrality, but they can help other organisations by delivering graduates who are aware of sustainability and provide specific training towards building a sustainability culture."

== Climate change ==
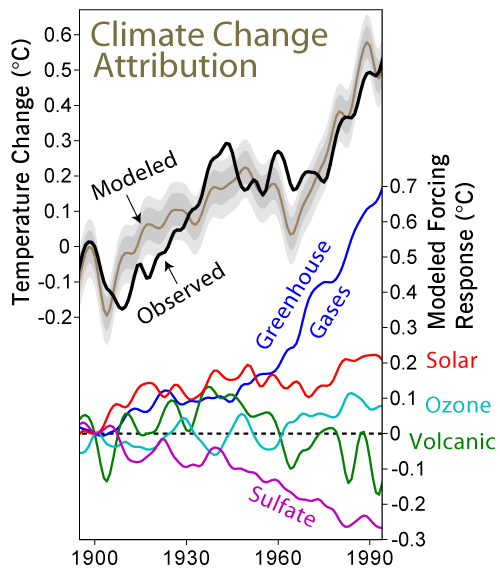
Climate change graphs

It has been evident that climate change has become the main focus in the pursuit of sustainable solutions. As more evidence grows on the significant changes in the weather patterns in the past few decades and the impacts it has on disrupting human and natural systems far more quickly than what has been predicted, actions need to be made in order to maintain efforts in eliminating greenhouse gas emissions. With the lack of help from the government in reinforcing policies to further reduce these emissions, colleges and universities have taken it upon themselves to sustain this world through efforts around their own campuses.

Several programs have been implemented into action in order to keep track and encourage these institutions in committing to reduce greenhouse gas emissions ('mitigation'). The American College & University President's Climate Change Commitment (ACUPCC) is an effort to address the issue of global climate disruption promised by a network of colleges and universities that have made commitments to eliminate greenhouse gas emission from specific campus operations, "while promoting the research and educational efforts and to promote the research and educational efforts of higher education to equip society to re-stabilize the earth’s climate. Its mission is to accelerate progress towards climate neutrality and sustainability by empowering the higher education sector to educate students, create solutions, and provide leadership-by-example for the rest of society." With nearly 673 active signatories to date, 1343 GHG inventories submitted, and 419 submitted climate action plans – greenhouse gas emissions should no longer further to exist in the future.

=== University of California at Berkeley ===
“The university has made great progress on climate action by completing an inventory of greenhouse gas emissions (GHG) and formalizing its commitment to reduce these emissions to 1990 levels by 2014. The campus will meet its 2014 target through a series of mitigation strategies including energy efficiency projects, installation of on-site renewables, reducing fuel usage by the campus fleet and commuters, and educational projects led by students aimed at changing behavior. So far, strategies are working. Campus greenhouse gas emissions were down by 4.5%- reaching its lowest level since 2005.” With Berkeley's efforts to take action has implemented the CalCAP program that collaborates administration, faculty, and student working to reduce gas emissions on campus by one “conducting an annual ten-source greenhouse gas emission inventory to track progress, developing and implementing infrastructure and behavioral strategies to reduce the climate impacts of buildings and transportation, and setting and meeting a series of emission reduction targets until climate neutrality is achieved.”

=== Clemson University ===
Founded in 1889 in South Carolina, Clemson University has committed to reducing greenhouse emissions by 20 percent on campus by the year 2020 from 2000 levels as part of their adopted sustainable energy policy in 2008. As part of their plan to further reduce gas emissions, Clemson has adopted a Sustainable Building Policy Plan in 2004 pledging “all new construction and major renovations would achieve at least a Silver LEED certification from the U.S. Green Building Council.” Becoming part of the earliest adopters of this policy, their Advanced Materials Laboratory was the first LEED-certified building in the state. Already resulting in eight more successful projects either certified as LEED-silver or LEED-gold. “Clemson will also pursue opportunities to produce carbon-free energy through three primary approaches: Determine “big-swing” projects to source renewable/clean energy at less than or equal to current prices. Evaluate other sourcing alternatives. Evaluate possible on-site power generation and/or energy storage options including combined Heat 7 Power (CHP), including microturbines; Geothermal heat pump systems (heating & cooling); Bio-fuels; Solar thermal and photovoltaics; and Energy Storage Alternatives (batteries and thermal).”

=== Ohio University ===
Ohio University plans to reduce greenhouse gas emissions by 20 percent from 2004 levels by 2014. Alden Library located on campus has a program to automatically shut down all computers once the library closes, having most computers already containing energy efficient LED monitors. A campus-wide efficiency upgrade beginning in April 2000 started a 10-year campus renewal project through a performance contract with the company Vestar. Completed projects through the 10-year plan include: “Carbon-dioxide monitors were installed in Morton and Boyd Halls; Heat recovery and heat exchangers were installed in the Life Science Center, Installation of power factor correction capacitor bank—the second half of the 69 kV system had new 1,340 kVAR capacitors installed to reduce KVA billing demand costs; Heat economizers were installed in Lausche Heating Plant” just to name a few. Ohio has also successfully developed the Green House Project that offers incentives of at least $500 to landlords for improving their energy efficiency in off-campus housing which has achieved annual reductions of more than 67,000 kilowatt-hours of electricity and more than 74 tons of avoided carbon emissions.

=== Princeton University ===
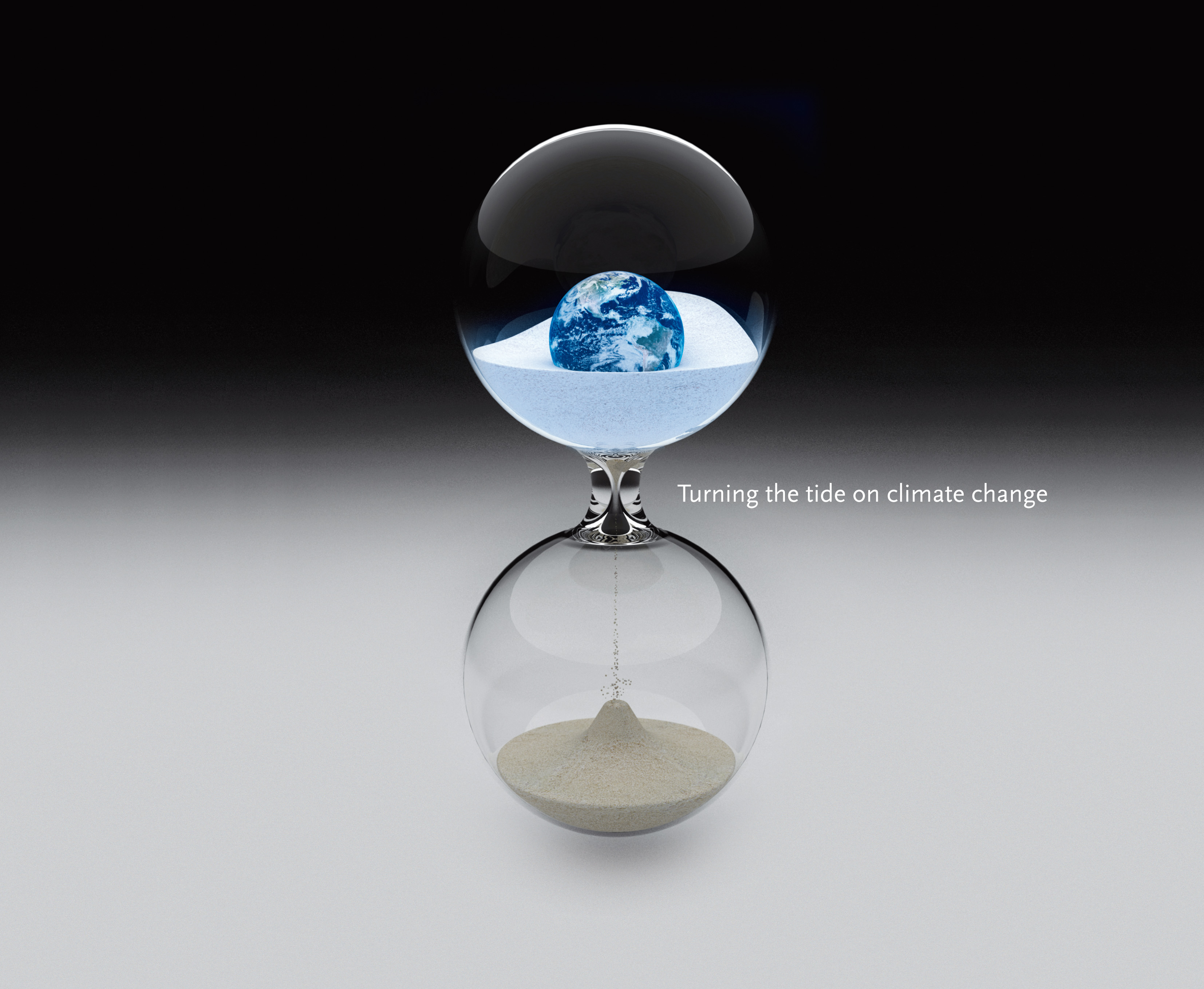
Turning the Tide on Climate Change

This Ivy League school has committed to reducing its greenhouse gas emissions 1,990 levels by 2020. In doing so, Princeton is focusing on alternative technologies and fuels to decrease the emissions from the central power facility and the buildings it heats cools, and electrifies which accounts for 85 percent of the Universities emissions. Another strategy the university is planning is to expand energy conservation through retrofits in existing buildings across campus, along with designing new constructions and renovations around campus to use 50% less energy than the amount required by current energy code. With a commitment to design all projects with at least LEED silver equivalency.

A new step in the climate change Princeton has proposed is applying an “internal voluntary “CO_{2} tax” when conducting financial cost-benefit analysis used to determine on whether to undertake energy-efficient designs and technologies.” Allowing the university to place a monetary value on environmental impact, “which in turn will increase the “savings” that we would achieve by undertaking the project.” Transportation has been another main focus considering it’s the second-largest source for the universities' campus emissions footprint. In resolving this problem Princeton has planned to replace retire campus fleet vehicles with appropriate zero or low-emission vehicles, along with encouraging walking and biking as means of commuting through incentives and enhancing bike lanes and walking paths.

=== Yale University ===
Also leading by example, Yale aims to achieve reducing a 43 percent reduction of greenhouse gas emissions by the year 2020, with already achieving the reduction of 7 percent since 2005. “Yale University has established a fifteen-year action plan to take responsibility for its emissions and will focus on increasing efficiency of on-campus energy production and distribution, energy conservation initiatives, testing renewable energy technologies, and requiring a LEED Gold minimum standard for new construction and large renovations.” One of the most significant contributors to Yale's greenhouse gas reduction was the reduction of its Sterling Power Plant to a combined heat and power facility, known as co-generate. Powering the university's medical campus, the Sterling Plant was originally built as a coal-burning steam plant but converted to “accommodate cleaner-burning fuels over the last 88 years.” Since then the new co-generator unit of the plant has “operated at about 79% thermal efficiency and the boiler operates at around 90% thermal efficiency.” An estimate reduction of 15,000 metric tons of carbon dioxide equivalent per year, “equivalent to the taking more than 2,600 cars off the road” due to the increase in efficiency from the plant.

According to the EPA's Green Power Partnership, American University is the largest east coast school to purchase 100 percent green power and the second largest in the nation, behind the University of California, Santa Cruz (57 million kilowatt-hours of annual electricity usage). In the Washington, D.C., metropolitan area, Catholic University is the only other university green power purchaser (13 million kilowatt-hours).

== Energy ==
American universities are working towards becoming more sustainable in the face of global warming. One way that many of them tackle the problem is by using more renewable energy such as solar, wind, biomass, or geothermal energy. Many are also working on getting ‘green fees’ so that they can purchase renewable energy if they do not create their own. Some universities like Middle Tennessee State University, University of North Carolina, and the Evergreen State College already have green fees in place. Other schools like the University of Florida and universities in Texas are working hard to add a green fee to their tuition so that they can improve their sustainability ratings.

According to Focus.com “Of 149 schools which reported the use of renewable energy, a score of A− was awarded to Amherst College (MA), Arizona State University-Tempe (AZ), University of California-San Diego (CA), University of Colorado (CO), Dickinson College (PA), Harvard University (MA), Luther College (IA), Macalester College (MN), Middlebury College (VT), University of Minnesota (MN), University of New Hampshire (NH), the University of North Carolina at Chapel Hill (NC), Oberlin College (OH), Pacific Lutheran University (WA), Pomona College (CA), Smith College (MA), Stanford University (CA), University of Washington (WA), Wesleyan University (CT), Williams College (MA), and Yale University (CT). Another 28 schools scored B+ and 7 institutions scored a mark of D on renewable energy use." Two out of every five schools purchase renewable energy, either through the purchase of green power directly from their utility or through renewable energy credits equivalent to a percentage of their energy use. Nearly half of the schools produce renewable energy on campus, with solar, wind, bioenergy or geothermal systems in operation."

=== Wind ===
Wind energy is a source of renewable power which comes from air current flowing across the earth's surface. Wind turbines harvest this kinetic energy and convert it into usable power which can provide electricity for homes. Many universities have invested in wind energy because it is clean, renewable, and good for the local economy. Wind energy is known for being 'clean' because it produces no pollution or greenhouse gases. Wind is a renewable energy resource, it is inexhaustible and requires no "fuel" besides the wind that blows across the earth; it is also beneficial for the local economy because the energy is harvested and produced locally. For universities, this means that their energy costs are lowered while also being more sustainable.

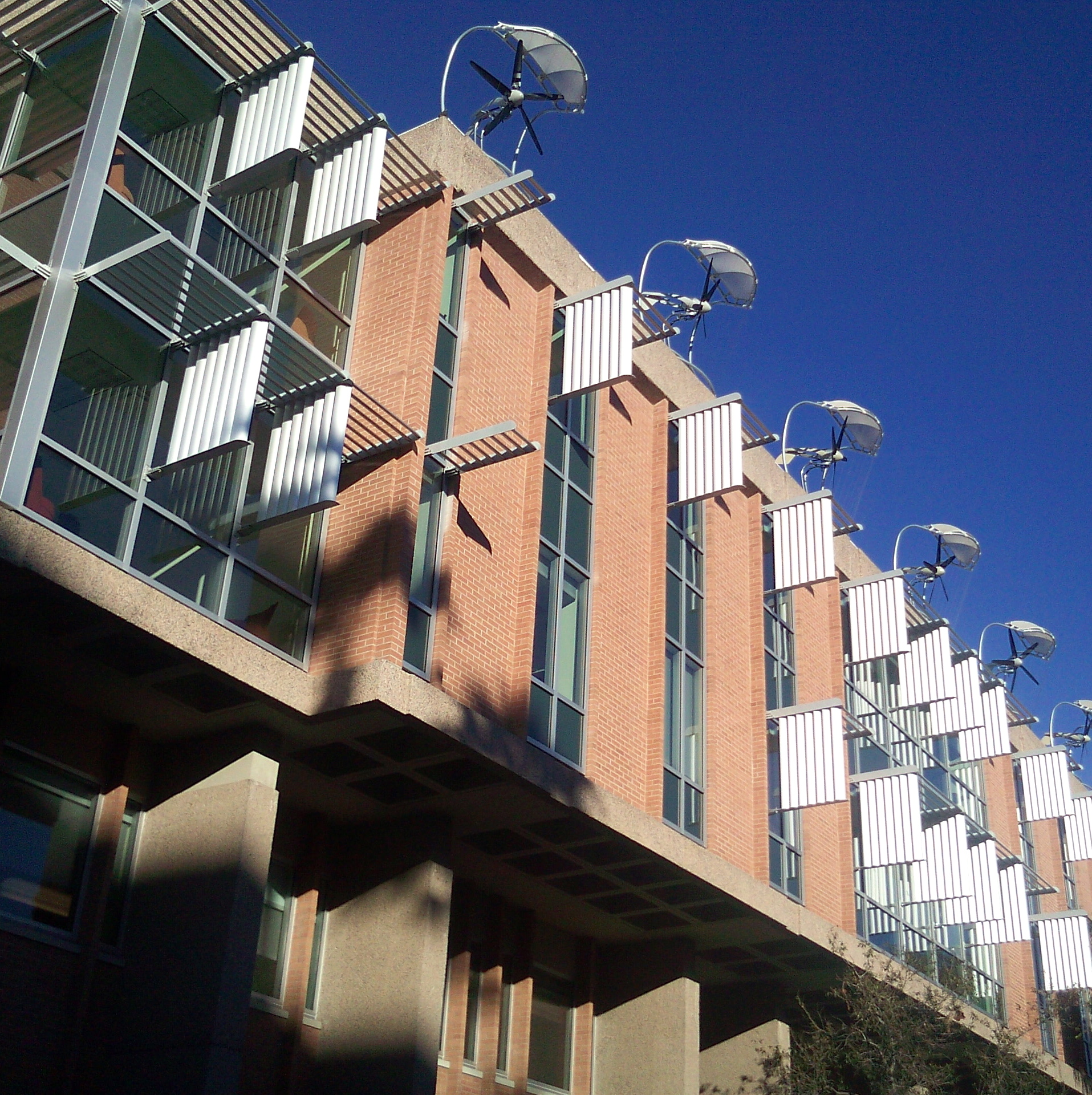
ASU School of Sustainability 3217218675

==== Yale ====
Yale University, Connecticut, decided to reduce their energy beyond solar panels so in 2009 they installed ten 1-kilowatt micro wind turbines on top of the Engineering and Applied Science Center. At only 6.5 feet tall and weighing only 60 pounds, these ten turbines generate up to 26 megawatt-hours of electricity annually, reducing Yale's carbon footprint by 20,000 pounds a year.

==== University of Vermont ====
The University of Vermont has erected and installed a small-scale, 10-kilowatt wind turbine on its campus. It is expected to generate 3,000-5,000 kilowatt-hours of electricity per year, enough to power an energy-efficient home for 12 months. “The project is part of the Vermont Department of Public Service (DPS) Wind Development Program, which supports the installation of small-scale turbines to demonstrate the benefits of wind energy. Funding for the wind turbine was provided by a $30,000 matching grant from the DPS. The funds are a portion of $1.5 million in U.S. Department of Energy funds secured by Senator James Jeffords for wind projects.”

==== University of Colorado–Boulder ====
In 2000, Students vote to purchase renewable wind-energy credits to match power used in all major campus construction after 2000, making CU-Boulder the first university in the nation to purchase wind energy.

=== Solar ===
==== Florida Gulf Coast University ====
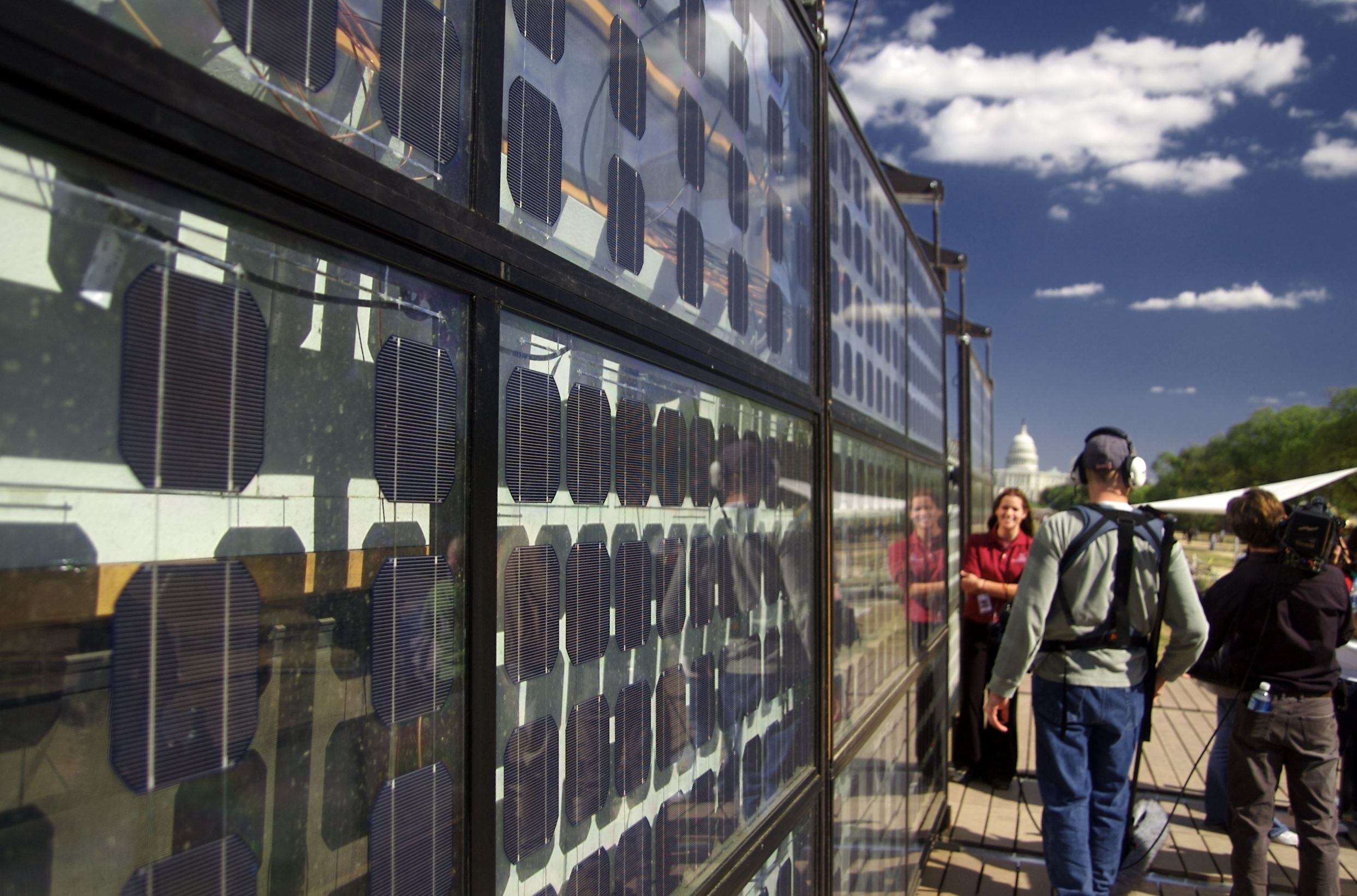
Texas A&M University (solar panels) Solar Decathlon 2007

Florida Gulf Coast University, located in Fort Myers, Florida, has made environmental sustainability their top priority. In January 2010, the university installed a 2-megawatt solar energy system on a 16-acre field. These 10,080 solar panels will generate enough electricity to power 600 homes. FGCU formed a public-private partnership with Regenesis Power resulting in the construction of the $17 million project. Regenesis Power is a national alternative energy company headquartered in Simi Valley, California, with regional offices in Florida. The solar energy field is projected to save the institution $22 million over a 30-year period. Its impact will be felt immediately as the electrical cost will be reduced from 10.5 cents per kilowatt-hour to two cents per kilowatt-hour. As a clean energy source, annually the solar energy field will prevent an estimated 9,000 pounds of nitrogen oxide, 14,000 pounds of sulfur dioxide, and 5.1 million pounds of carbon dioxide from being introduced into our environment.

==== University of Florida ====
In 2010, the University of Florida, under President Bernie Machen, installed solar panels on the roof of Powell Hall, which is home to the Florida Museum of Natural History. The 75-kilowatt panels generate one-third of the museum's electricity.

==== University of Colorado-Boulder ====
Solar panels installed on the University of Colorado-Boulder buildings have contributed to a 23 percent reduction in energy consumption despite a 14 percent growth in campus since 2005.

=== Geothermal ===
==== Ball State University ====
Ball State University, located in Indiana, started using geothermal energy in place of 4 coal fired burners in 2009. The new system will save them an estimated $2 million a year. They are the first University to build a geothermal system of this size; 50 buildings spread over 660 acres of campus are being heated by this system. Although the project is estimated to have cost between $65 and $70 million, switching from coal to geothermal energy is estimated to be cutting down schools' green house gas emissions by 50 percent. This saves 75,000 tons of carbon from being released into the atmosphere annually.

==== Lipscomb University ====
Other schools are looking to use geothermal for cooling efforts like The University of Lipscomb in Nashville, Tennessee. The university installed a geothermal pump in March 2005. Built in the 77,000-square-foot Ezell Center, the system of 144 wells sunk 300 feet below the softball field will keep the temperature steady year-round. The geothermal pump costs the university $1.2 million but saves the university on average $90,000 a year. The pump also helps the environment due to 40%-60% less energy being used compared to a standard heat pump.

=== Green fees ===
In fall 2005, 89% of voting students at Middle Tennessee State University supported an $8 per semester fee increase to purchase renewable energy and fund the installation of renewable energy and energy conservation technologies on campus.

In January 2005, 91% of voting students at Evergreen State College supported a $1 per credit fee increase (up to $20.00 maximum per quarter) to purchase renewable energy and fund the installation of renewable energy and energy conservation technologies on campus.

In February 2003, a renewable energy referendum passed at the University of North Carolina at Chapel Hill, bringing around $200,000 for renewable energy projects every year beginning 2004-2005 pending approval by the UNC Board of Trustees and the UNC system Board of Governors. The university now has a $4 per semester green fee to help them buy energy from more sustainable sources and to lower their carbon impact.

Students at the University of Florida, under the club I.D.E.A.S for UF are working to get a 50 cent per credit hour fee to be able to buy renewable energy for the school. UF hopes to be carbon neutral by 2025.

Students under the organization I.D.E.A.S. at the University of Central Florida have also been working towards passing the Green Fee in Orlando. Working hand in hand with administration, SGA and student organizations, they are working towards passing a 75 cent per credit hour fee to provide an outlet for students and staff to implement renewable energy on campus. This fee will also help to increase energy efficiencies and reach goals set out in the university's Climate Action Plan.

According to the United States Environmental Protection Agency's Green Power Partnership, American University is the largest east coast school to purchase 100 percent green power and the second largest in the nation, behind University of California, Santa Cruz (57 million kilowatt-hours of annual electricity usage).

== Recycling and materials diversion ==
Recycling symbol

Recycling is the process by which materials are processed and made into new products, after having been already used. Recycling reduces the use of raw materials, the creation and use of energy and pollution (air, water and land). Recycling is maintained and run through drop-offs for various materials, buy-back centers, curbside collection areas, etc. All of these are done in addition to landfill waste; for instance, there may be a recycling bin next to a garbage can.

Across the nation, some universities are making efforts to create recycling programs that are supposed help to create a more “green” university. Almost all programs are unique, and all are working towards the goal at a fast rate. For instance, the University of Florida was working to have zero waste going into landfills by the year 2015. Although they did not meet this goal, there are still attempts to reduce trash.

=== Reuse programs ===
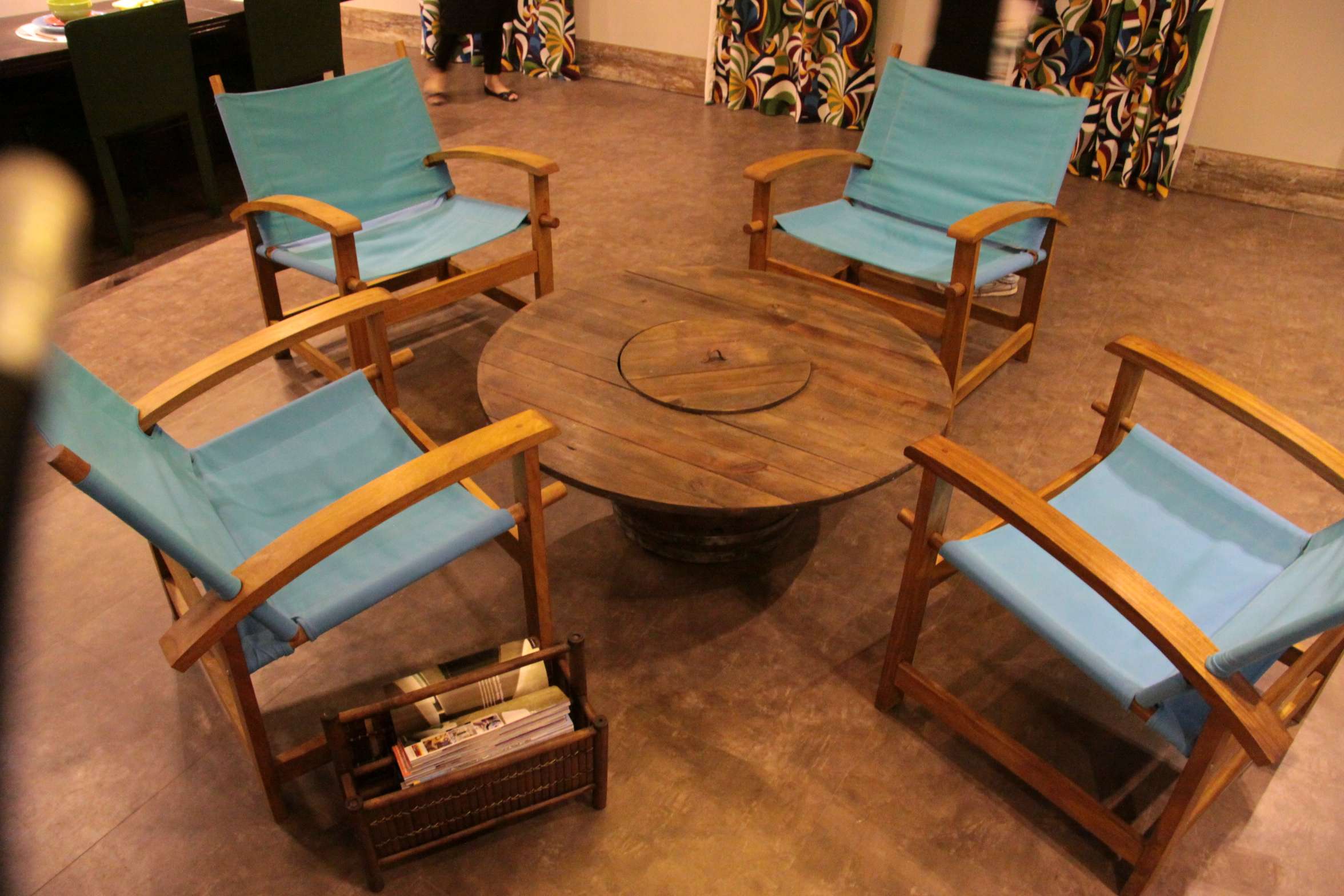
Repurposing a wire reel as a table

Universities and colleges everywhere are creating programs for the reuse of various materials. Reuse of materials involves either reusing something for its intended purpose, or repurposing an item for any intent. For instance, having a reusable water bottle is reuse in a perfect sense. However, an old wire reel as a table (not its original purpose) is a great example of repurposing a material. This example can be seen to the left.

==== University of Michigan ====
The University of Michigan in Ann Arbor, Michigan, has introduced a program called “Recycle Write!,” an initiative for students, faculty and staff to recycle pens, pencils and markers. The University Recycling Program joined forces with TerraCycle and Procurement Services to create the program. Unlike the SMART program at the University of Minnesota, Recycle Write! has no initial cost. To use the program, the university simply puts bins or boxes where they think they will get the most use with a flyer attached to them. When the bin is full, Procurement Services provides a pre-paid label to mail the contents of the box into a plant where they are re-used. However, the program doesn't just encourage the re-use of writing utensils. For every item donated, TerraCycle donates $.02 to C.S. Mott Children's Hospital, located at the University of Michigan.

==== Cornell University ====
At Cornell University in Ithaca, New York, the Cornell Computer Reuse Association is sending used computers and computer lab equipment all over the world to those in need. The club's mission is “to donate computers and other computer-related technology to humanitarian organizations in the developing world and in the local Ithaca community.” Since its introduction in 2007, the club has sent computers to countries including Mali, Tanzania, Nigeria, Jamaica, Nicaragua, Iraq and Afghanistan among others. All of the computers and equipment are donated to the club, where they are refurbished and shipped out. The club has sent printers, scanners, projectors, monitors, laptops, and computers to places such as Habitat for Humanity in Ithaca, New York, to Women's University in Iraq. Universities everywhere are doing their part to make a greener planet, from banning the sale of water bottles to donating computers around the world.

=== Waste management ===
While other universities' programs revolve around the reuse of various materials, a more common route is waste management. Waste management programs are designed to decrease the number of materials going into landfills on a daily basis. Options for management, including recycling bins and cans, are relatively easy to implement and have great success rates.

==== University of Florida ====
Through bins located all across campus, the University of Florida, located in Gainesville, Florida, has recycled over 200 million pounds of paper, glass, plastic, concrete, metal, and other materials since the introduction of recycling at the university in 1989. The University of Florida is also focusing on using the Three R's as part of its recycling program. Not only are bins for recycling used across campus, but also the university has implemented programs to recycle non-consumer waste. The university has employed United States Environmental Protection Agency and United States National Research Council approved methods of disposing of chemical waste for its various labs. At clinics and research labs across campus, there are also biomedical waste pick-ups. With these programs, hazardous and/or toxic materials are not going into landfills. Also, the university composts or otherwise repurposes all yard waste. Grass clippings and other trimmings are often left out as a source of nutrients for remaining landscaping.

==== University of Minnesota ====
The University of Minnesota has introduced the SMART (self-managed activities for recyclables and trash) program across campus to increase recycling efforts. The program is designed to take recycling to the individual – those who create waste are those responsible for recycling it. SMART operates on “The Quad System” – instead of having trash cans under desks and near shelves, there are four trash cans at each location: one for newspaper, one for office paper, one for cans and bottles, and another for trash only. Custodial workers collect from the bins once per day, instead of emptying individual trash cans from under desks. The program has taken recycling rates at the University of Minnesota from 60 to 90 percent since its introduction. Two months after the introduction of the SMART, the program published surveys for students, faculty and staff to take. Over half said that with the SMART program, they were recycling more. 86% of those polled enjoyed the SMART system. The bins cost $250,000. However, after three years, the cost of the program would be refunded because of less disposal fees and a reduction in custodial wages. Through the program, university students and employees were more aware of the waste they were creating, and the campus has become more sustainable because of it.

==== University of Oregon ====
The University of Oregon, located in Eugene, Oregon, has a campus recycling program that has made great strides in making a cleaner campus. With over 1500 campus collection sites, the university is meeting both its own and the state's goals on waste management and sustainability. Every day, the group meets to tally collection sheets to monitor waste management. They also have an annual campus waste analysis, where the group discusses how they can improve the program as a whole. In addition to recycling waste, the university is creating new re-use opportunities, another point in the three Rs (reduce, re-use, and recycle). The university has been increasing the use of surplus furniture and working with vendors that are using less of and more sustainable packaging. Currently, the program is working towards having compost bins and water bottle refill spout in all campus buildings. They are also working to have more sustainable department offices and buildings.

== Transportation and mobility ==
According to the Environmental Protection Agency, transportation is the second-largest contributor to greenhouse gas emissions in the United States, at about 29 percent. As a result, American colleges and universities focus on reducing transportation impacts through shared and active transportation modes, including increased walking, bicycle use, public transit including buses and light rail, carpooling and vanpooling programs, and car-sharing programs like Zipcar.

=== Bicycle use ===
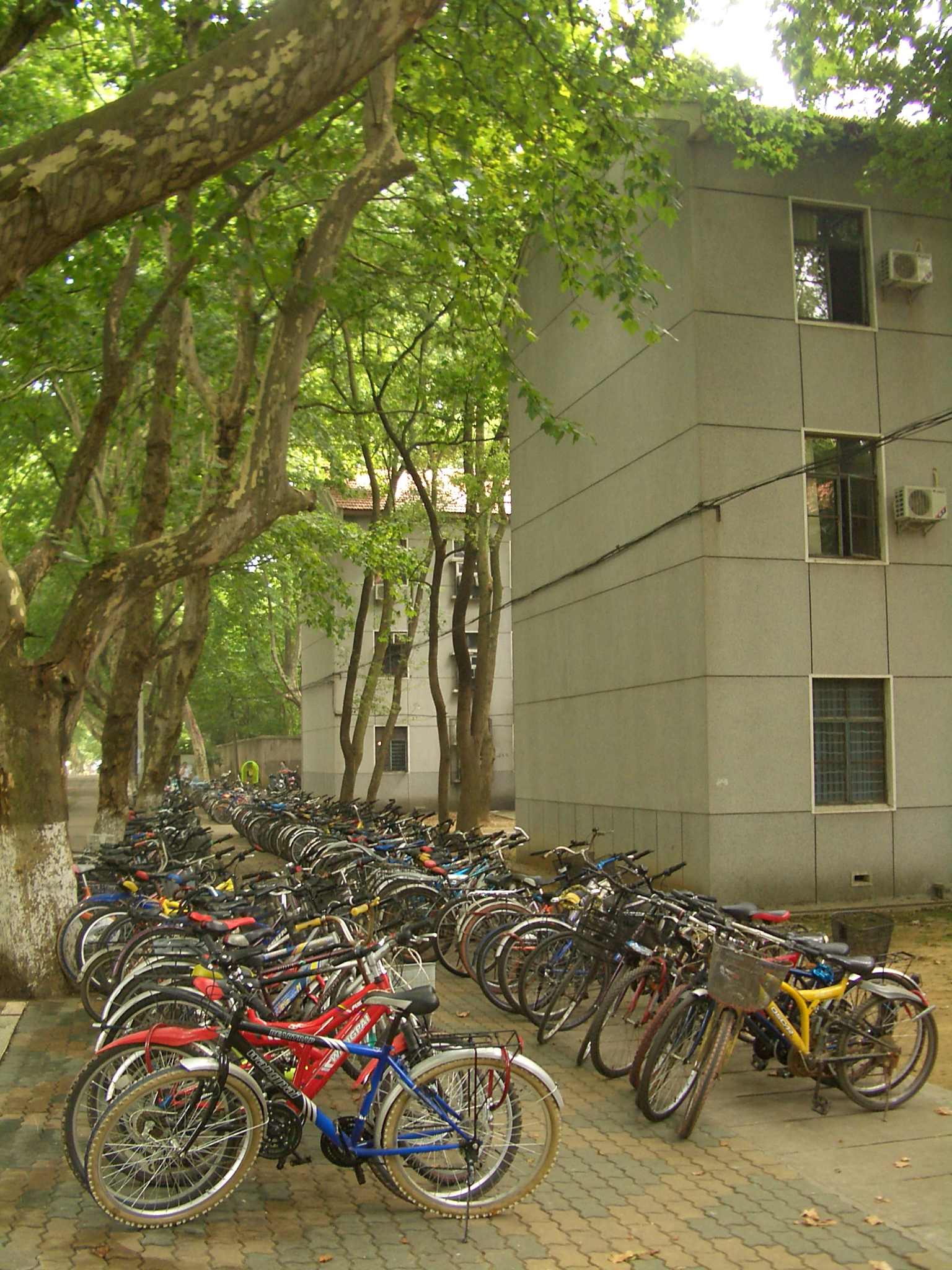
Bicycles in front of a U.S. college dormitory

Colleges and universities across the United States are increasingly encouraging students to ride bicycles to class to reduce CO_{2} emissions. Many of these colleges are implementing programs that provide students with incentives to do so. For example, Ripon College in Wisconsin provided free mountain bikes to every incoming freshman signing a pledge to not bring a vehicle to campus for the entire 2010–11 school year.

Colleges such as St. Lawrence University in New York and Castleton State College in Vermont have started programs that allow students and faculty to rent bicycles to ride on or near campus. These programs often include rental helmets and locks as well.

The University of Washington's annual Ride in the Rain Challenge encourages students and faculty to ride a bicycle to campus every day, regardless of weather conditions. The university gives out awards for “Most Commute Trips”, “Most Rides in the Rain”, “Most New Riders”, and “Most Commute Miles.”

Some universities, such as the University of California, approach sustainability from a leisure perspective. UC encourages bicycle riding by providing students with maps and directions for safe bike routes to popular destinations in the area. The college also auctions off abandoned bikes every semester to encourage bike use even more. This gives students the opportunity to purchase high quality bicycles at discounted prices.

=== Public transit ===
Buses and other modes of public transit have been always been an important part of college campuses, but awareness of carbon emissions has caused many colleges and universities to take it more seriously in recent years. Many colleges such as Cornell University provide students with free public bus passes or allow students to use student ID cards as bus passes. Students at The George Washington University in Washington, D.C., have access to campus shuttle buses as well as two Metro subway stations.

Chicago's Loyola University sets an example for public transit as well with its variety of transportation options. Students at the university have access to the Chicago Transit Authority's bus and train routes and the Red Line elevated train. Students there are granted unlimited access to these resources through the CTA U-Pass program.

=== Carpooling programs ===
Carpooling efforts on many college campuses aim to reduce the number of vehicles on the road and reduce colleges’ carbon footprints. Colleges such as the University of Michigan and Florida International University utilize a web-based application called GreenRide that helps commuters coordinate carpools and vanpools rather than driving individually to campus. In addition, a number of other rideshare software programs have been created to help Americans locate potential carpooling arrangements. Many of these, such as Zimride, CommuteSmart, and RideFinders reach out to university and college students across the United States. Some colleges offer incentives such as discounted parking permits for participants in carpooling programs.

=== Car sharing programs ===
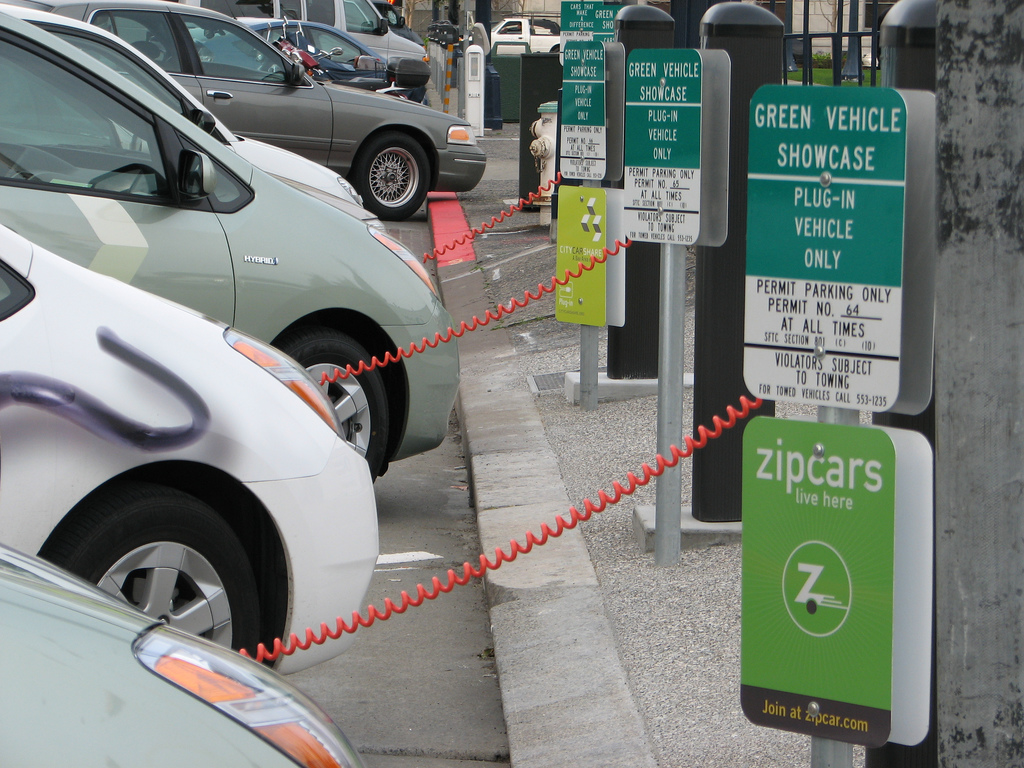
Zipcar charging stations

Car sharing programs like Zipcar have a presence on and near American college and university campuses. Zipcar aims to make the United States less dependent on personally-owned vehicles by providing vehicles that are available to rent by the hour. According to their website, “every Zipcar takes at least 15 personally-owned vehicles off the road.” Vehicles in these car-sharing programs tend to be small and fuel-efficient. Unlike typical rental car companies, car sharing companies often require participants in the program to be only 18 years old, rather than 21, thus encouraging a larger demographic of students to participate in the program.

Companies have spread to university campuses across the United States. In 2010, Lewis & Clark College in Oregon even provided free memberships to its Uhaul U Car Share program when it was first implemented.

In April 2011, Connect by Hertz (now known as Hertz on Demand), was the very first car-sharing company to bring production electric vehicles to a university or college campus. Hertz on Demand cars are Environmental Protection Agency Smartway certified, meaning that they produce fewer greenhouse gas emissions. Hertz and other car rental companies offer a variety of electric vehicles, “providing a zero emission mobility option for everyone.”

== Green buildings ==
Green buildings focus on key elements of human and environmental health. This includes sustainable site development, energy and water consumption, materials selection, and indoor environmental quality. Natural light, recycled and nontoxic materials, building controls, and efficient technologies are used in green buildings. On a college or university campus, green buildings can reduce consumption, educate students, and promote sustainable practices. Additionally, many universities educate students about green buildings with courses, minors, and majors. Likewise, many universities design and build green buildings to help reduce their energy use, water consumption, and reduce their greenhouse gas emissions.

Buildings are responsible for about 40% of total U.S. carbon emissions, making them a major focus for climate action.

Third-party green building certification programs offer an incentive for building owners to implement green design, construction, efficient operations, and eco-friendly solutions.

=== LEED ===
In 1998, the United States Green Building Council created the now internationally recognized LEED green building rating system to help set green building standards and recognition. By including LEED certified green buildings, colleges and universities work to decrease carbon emissions, conserving water and energy and saving money each month.

LEED's structure has evolved over time, but has six primary considerations: integrative process, sustainable sites, energy and water management, material and resource use, indoor environmental quality, and innovation. There are now hundreds of U.S. colleges and universities with at least one LEED certified building, with many campuses requiring all new buildings to pursue a LEED certification at certain levels.

The LEED green building rating system and rankings are:

- Certified: 40 to 49 points
- Silver: 50 to 59 points
- Gold: 60 to 79 points
- Platinum: 80 points and above

=== Green materials ===
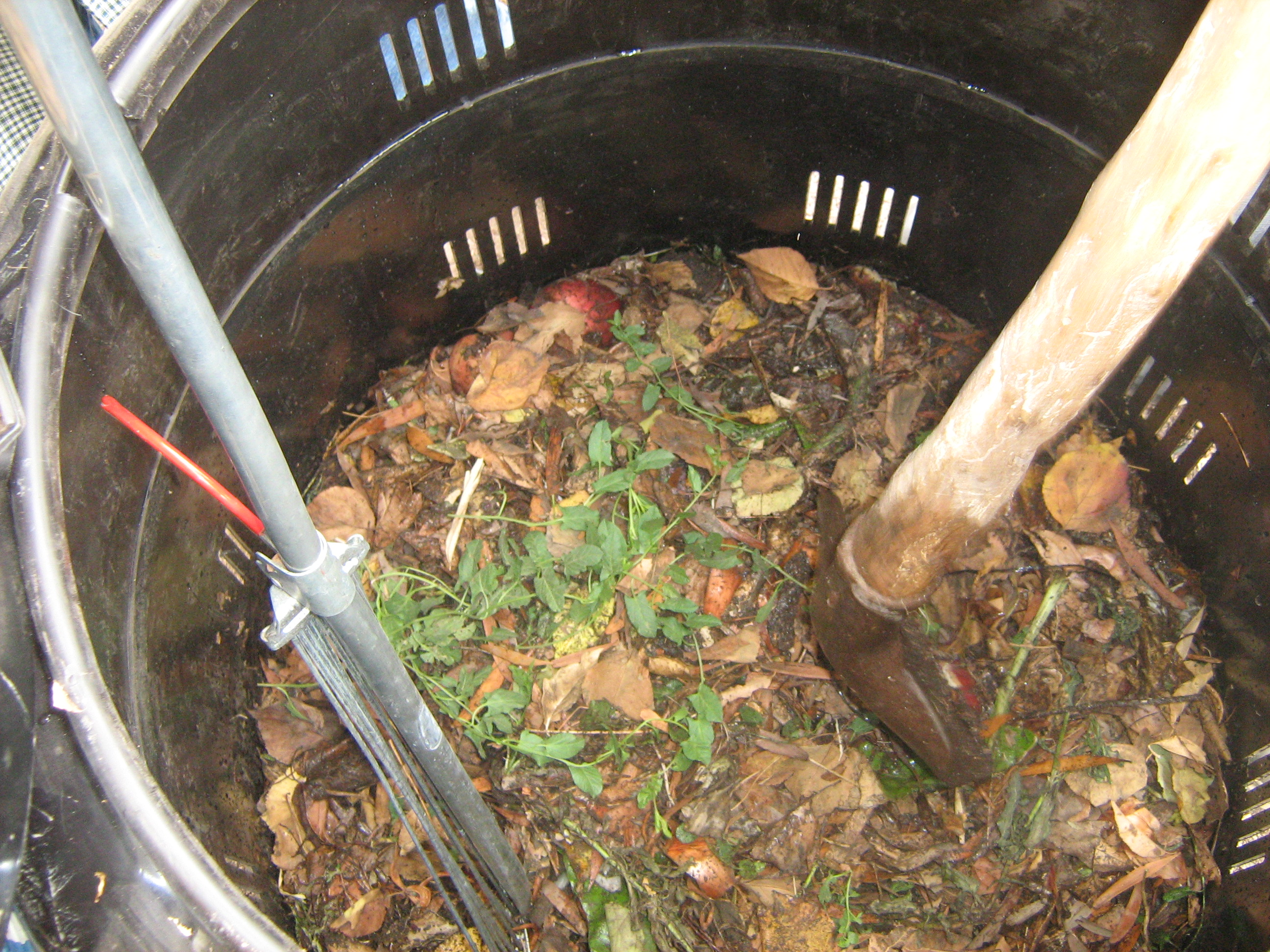
Composting

Some ways to reduce consumption, educate students, and promote sustainable practices would be:

- Green Roofs - a solution to the heat island effect associated with buildings.
- Compact fluorescent light bulbs - use less energy and give off less heat.
- Using recycled materials.
- Buying and using local materials- lower transportation costs.
- Low flow plumbing fixtures- waterless toilets, dual-flush toilets, and reclaimed water toilets.
- Low VOC paints- limit the amount of irritating emissions.

Buildings currently account for 1/6th of the world's freshwater use, 1/4th of all wood harvests, 2/5th of all material flows, and 2/5th of all energy flows. By using green buildings, consumption of resources, energy, and/or waste, could be reduced by 50-60%. Some sustainable materials used in Green Building that could reduce that percentage- fly ash, seal tech block, cold-form metal framing, isosurfaces, reclaimed lumber, composting, waterless urinals, greenscreen PVC-free fabrics, climate upholstery fabrics, evergreen solar panels, dual-flush toilets, and PS400 flat wall form.

=== Universities with LEED certifications ===
Given that LEED certifications have been awarded for buildings since 2001, many colleges and universities have LEED and other third-party certified green buildings on their campuses. An outdated selection of these are provided below as examples.

- Duke University has almost 20 buildings that have received a LEED certification and another 10 that are somewhere in the process. All new construction must also be built to LEED Silver standards. Duke's 5,600 square foot Ocean Science Teaching Center has a LEED Gold rating and it was the first Marine laboratory building that was totally green.
- Harvard University has arguably the greenest buildings of any college with 26 LEED buildings and about 75 somewhere in the LEED process. Harvard also requires that all new construction be at least LEED Gold. Harvard's Pearson Laboratory has a LEED Gold rating and it boasts a 44% reduction in water consumption below EPAct standards and carbon dioxide sensors that control the outside air to vary based on occupancy and demand.
- University of Colorado has 5 LEED buildings (3 of which are Gold) and about a dozen that qualify under LEED but are not certified. All new buildings must adhere to LEED Gold standards. The Science and Engineering Building at the University of Colorado has thin-film solar panels, an ice-storage system, high-efficiency windows, energy-efficient lighting, and low-chemical paints.
- University of Florida has 12 LEED buildings with over two dozen somewhere in the LEED process. All new construction must be built to LEED gold standards. The James W. Heavener Football Complex at the University of Florida was the first LEED Platinum athletic building in the United States and the first Platinum-rated building in Florida. The James W. Heavener Football Complex uses 100% reclaimed water for irrigation, dual flush toilets, and occupancy sensors to control and reduce lighting.
- University of Washington currently has 7 LEED buildings and is planning on adding twenty more. University of Washington has also mandated that all new construction meets LEED Silver Standards. The Benjamin Hall Interdisciplinary Research Building was the 11th structure in the United States to be rated as LEED-CS Pilot Gold. Energy savings are projected to be at least $220,000 per year and the building has underground parking, energy-efficient plumbing, recycled content, and refrigerating and air-conditioning systems free of ozone-depleting chemicals.
- Yale University also is one of the schools most dedicated to green building design with 9 projects already with LEED, several more seeking LEED, and all new buildings to be built to LEED Gold standards. The Yale University Sculpture Building and Gallery has a green roof, eight-foot operable windows, and a skin that lets in natural light.
- University of Maryland has 22 buildings with LEED Silver standard or higher as of 2024. All new developments on campus are 100% carbon neutral. The A. James Clark Hall, constructed in 2017, uses displacement ventilation and 100% storm water management.

== Sustainability among student groups ==
=== Student Knowledge, Attitudes, and Behaviors ===
Despite the millions spent each year on sustainability initiatives on college campuses, there is very little evidence that this work is going noticed by the students themselves, or that they are learning about the importance of practicing sustainable behaviors in their own lives. For example, at the University of Wisconsin-Eau Claire, Perrault and Clark found that about one-third of students surveyed did not know their campus had a Student Office of Sustainability, and nearly 80% did not know their own student fees were being used to pay for its $200,000 annual budget since its inception in 2011. When asked to define the term "sustainability," students also had a fairly uni-dimensional understanding of the concept - with the majority discussing the importance of simply maintaining the status-quo. While environmental factors were noted in about one-third of responses, the social and economic factors of the sustainability triad were largely not mentioned.

If we want students to participate in more sustainable behaviors, not only do colleges need to make performing sustainable behaviors easier, but there also needs to be more effective communication to help students understand the importance of performing these behaviors. One simple way could be through the incorporation of more sustainability-related content within existing college courses. For example, having students develop a detailed campaign plan for a campus sustainability partner in a strategic communication planning course led to increased attitudinal shifts toward sustainability over the course of a semester. Stanford University, for example, has been described as “a living lab of sustainability.” Their efforts towards sustainability include plans to reach 100% renewable electricity by 2021 and make Stanford a zero-waste campus by 2030.
