= ValloCycle Bike-Share Program =

Bike rental program in Montevallo, Alabama, U.S.

The ValloCycle Bike-Share Program is a mutual agreement between the University of Montevallo and Montevallo city to offer bicycle rentals to the surrounding community. The annual membership fees amount is roughly $2 per month for adults and $1 per month for children.

== History ==
Following educational webinar on bike-sharing programs worldwide, members of the Montevallo city council engaged students within the university's environmental studies program to research the feasibility of such a program within Montevallo.

The early development of the bike-share program had the goal of distinguishing itself from both existing campus bike-share programs, which were solely geared towards university populations, and large-scale corporate programs that required members to possess credit cards and accept usage fees based on specific time increments for every bicycle rental. The program's emphasis on differentiation was a key factor in shaping its initial programming.

In a community bicycle donation drive, over 100 bicycles were received from various sources. Students from the environmental club spent several months repairing 35 used bicycles of all types and sizes for use in the program. Bicycles were outfitted with various parts from local businesses, and were given logos of the sponsoring businesses to display.

The ValloCycle Bike-Share Program debuted October 14, 2011, in conjunction with the University of Montevallo's 114th Founder's Day celebration of sustainability. During that same month, the ValloCycle volunteer committee was also incorporated as an official recreational board underneath the supervision of the City of Montevallo.

Memberships can also be paid for through community service, with rental rights granted at the completion of 10 volunteer service hours within Montevallo.

== Community projects ==
=== "Share the Lane" Initiative ===
In conjunction with the Montevallo City Council and Public Works Department, successfully advocated and implemented the first city-wide "Share the Lane" initiative for any municipality in the state of Alabama. Initiative included the designation of over thirty high-traffic city streets, low-visibility roads and bridges, small residential neighborhoods, and school zones as "sharrows" lanes, complete with custom-made, readily identifiable signage bearing the ValloCycle logo. Recently utilized in the City of Birmingham, "sharrows" lanes are a unique infrastructure enhancement particularly adept at improving the safety and accessibility of bicyclists on roads too narrow for other roadway additions.

In addition to visible on-roadway signage to automatically raise motorist awareness as to bicyclist’ and pedestrians’ presence, a two-pronged ValloCycle educational PR campaign has resulted in positive press for this initiative in both local and regional news outlets, as well as heightened community support for the project through the display of educational placards at over fifty high-traffic community locations. These placard displays provide educational information about the need for greater bicycling and pedestrian enhancements to the roadways, and also explains just what the signs are intended to mean to both cyclists and motorists, respectively. The rights and obligations of both road users’ are represented in the educational campaign.

=== ValloCycle Town Map Project ===
It was researched, written, and designed by ValloCycle volunteer student coordinators, and developed in collaboration with the Birmingham Regional Planning Commission and the Montevallo Chamber of Commerce. The ValloCycle Town Map Project provides free publicity to over 50 cultural, sustainable, and commercial destinations unique to the Montevallo community. It outlined the easy accessibility of all of these locations via bicycle, and how individuals and families can get started cycling. Out-of-town destinations are specifically showcased as bicycling day trips, and the map also contains the most current depiction of the 2.5-mile Montevallo Parks Trail greenway system.

=== Bicycle Parking as Public Art Project ===
In conjunction with the University of Montevallo's Service Learning Department, the ValloCycle Board challenged the students of the Spring 2012 "Public Sculpture" course to design, fabricate, and install unique interpretations of bicycle parking facilities.

=== University of Montevallo student education ===
In conjunction with the University of Montevallo's Service Learning Department, the ValloCycle Board worked closely with the UM Kinesiology Department to center the curriculum of an existing required course for all Kinesiology majors to incorporate bicycle safety and maintenance skills. Upon completion of the course, students received certification to teach these same skills to children in the public school system. Throughout the course, each UM student was also required to test their knowledge in bicycle safety by administering supervised bike safety seminars to classes of children in the local elementary, intermediate, and high schools. Students’ technical knowledge was honed and tested by a required number of after-class service hours performing basic maintenance and repairs to ValloCycle bicycles.

== Community education ==
=== "Repairs to Resumes" ===
The ValloCycle Program's "Repairs to Resumes" course is a month-long series of afterschool youth workshops in bicycle safety and maintenance, hosted quarterly throughout the year. Participating students, ranging from ages 12 to 18, are recommended by local school administrators for demonstrating particular behavioral and academic "at-risk" behaviors. Students are then taught the essentials of basic and advanced bicycle repair in a structured classroom environment that emphasizes both the rights and responsibilities of bicyclists on the roadway as well as the gainful employment opportunities available to the students in the growing county and regional bicycle industry. All technical skills taught in the course are verified by the owners of local bicycle repair shops as trade skills that will put students ahead of other applicants when seeking employment. Students are required to pass a number of hands-on performance tests, and are given the opportunity to test their knowledge on ValloCycle bicycles of their own choice. Incorporated into the curriculum of every workshop are various recreational excursions that also serve to highlight community "green" spaces, such as the Montevallo Parks Trail, the UM Organic Community Garden, and historic Davis Falls.

Since students are rewarded with honorary ValloCycle memberships upon the completion of a safety and maintenance quiz, through its relationship with local school administrators, its coordinators frequently seek to bring in at-risk students whose families either suffer from inadequate transportation or whose behavior infractions have barred them from the public school bussing system.

=== Bicycle education sessions ===
Through bi-monthly, free Bicycle Education Sessions, individuals, families, and local organizations are invited to attend public bicycle practice seminars in Orr Park. Participants are taught how to ride a bike with advanced traffic and recreational riding skills taught to returning participants.

=== reCYCLEd art ===
The reCYCLEd art courses also provide a unique setting wherein participants are instructed on how to convert rusted, unusable bicycle parts into works of art. The first course, to be hosted in March, will give participants from the Montevallo Senior Center the opportunity to construct a working chandelier from bicycle parts too damaged for actual bicycle repair purposes. The second reCYCLEd art course will focus on designing and piecing together hand-crafted jewelry from bicycle parts, and will also consist of several in-class group discussions on how participants might utilize unusable or unneeded products from their own homes for personal economic benefit.

== Community events ==
=== Montevallo "Tour By Bike" ===
In conjunction with local independent business Eclipse Coffee and Books, the ValloCycle Board offers the Montevallo "Tour By Bike", a two-hour cycling tour of sustainable campus projects, community green spaces, and the local side of the downtown shopping district. The primary goal of this event was to promote bicycling within the community to the city's newest residents: the newest class of freshmen at the University of Montevallo. This event has been the focus of campus-wide campus celebrations of "green" projects and programs, and has since received significant press coverage by local news outlets. The Montevallo "Tour By Bike" is currently hosted twice throughout the year, and serves to raise student and community awareness about the wealth of outdoor recreational opportunities within the community.

== Organizational partnerships ==
In addition to its own primary partnership with the organization, the ValloCycle Board is responsible for instituting an official connection between the City of Montevallo and the CommuteSmart Program.

The CommuteSmart Program is a federally funded commuter incentive program developed and coordinated by the Birmingham Regional Planning Commission to alleviate air quality pollution and commuter traffic congestion, issues which are inextricably connected within this region.
