= University of Montevallo =

Public university in Montevallo, Alabama, US

- Former names: Alabama Girls’ Industrial School (1896–1911); Alabama Girls’ Technical Institute (1911–1919); Alabama Girls’ Technical Institute and College for Women (1919–1923); Alabama College, State College for Women (1923–1969)
- Motto: "Montevallo Means More”
- Type: Public liberal arts university
- Established: October 12, 1896; 130 years ago
- Accreditation: SACS
- Academic affiliations: COPLAC
- President: Michelle Johnston
- Students: 2,600
- Location: Montevallo, Alabama, United States; 33.10378°N 86.86497°W
- Campus: 160 acres (65 ha); Fringe town
- Newspaper: The Alabamian
- Colors: Purple and gold
- Nickname: Falcons
- Sporting affiliations: NCAA Division II - GSC
- Mascot: Freddie the Falcon
- Website: www.montevallo.edu

The University of Montevallo is a public university in Montevallo, Alabama. Founded on October 12, 1896, the university is Alabama's only public liberal arts college and a member of the Council of Public Liberal Arts Colleges. The University of Montevallo Historic District was established on campus in 1979. The school is located in a rural area in central Alabama.

== History ==
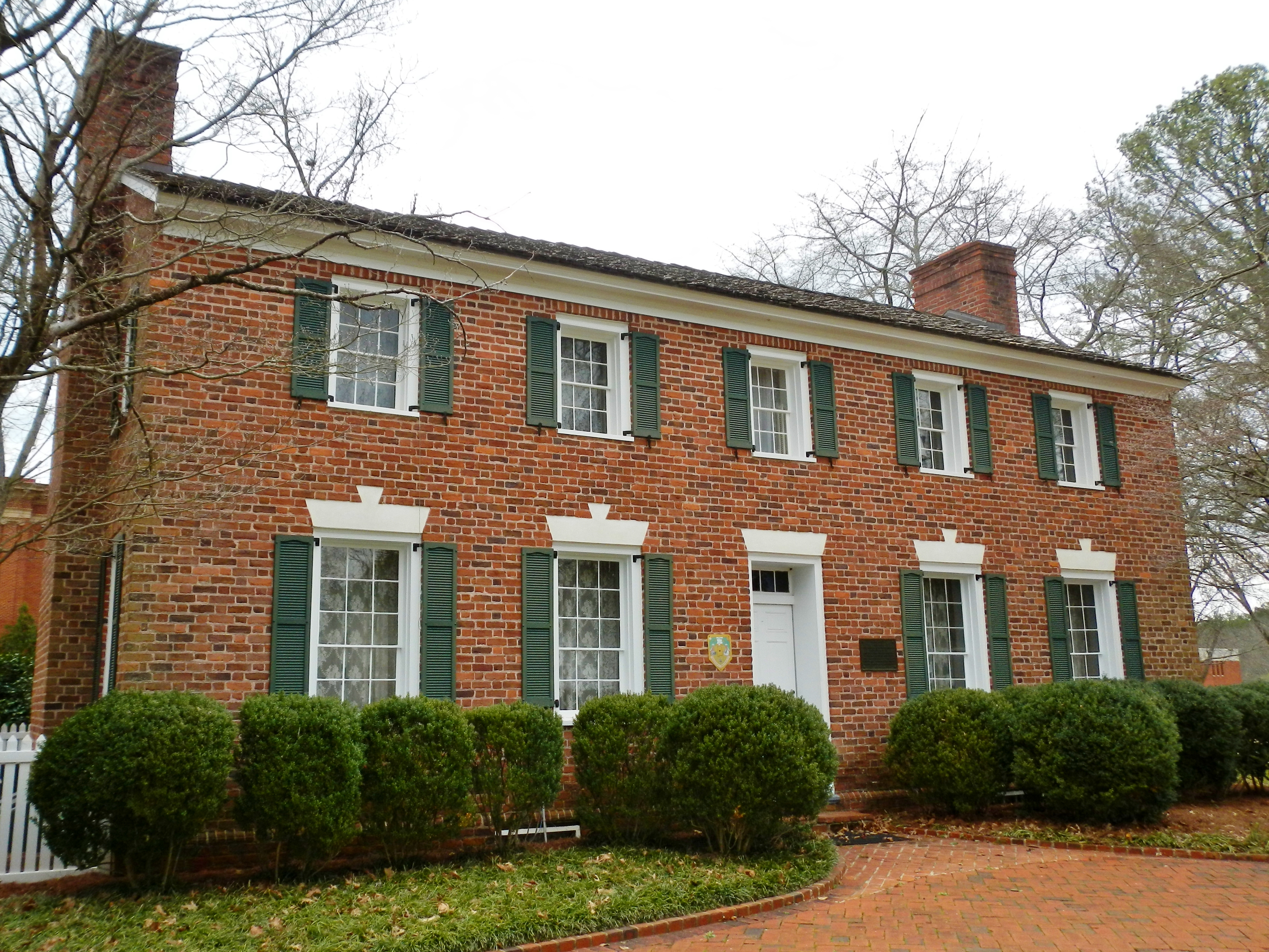
Built in the Federal style in 1823, the King House is the oldest building on campus, and was added to the National Register of Historic Places on January 14, 1972.

- Alabama Girls' Industrial School
- U.S. National Register of Historic Places
- U.S. Historic district
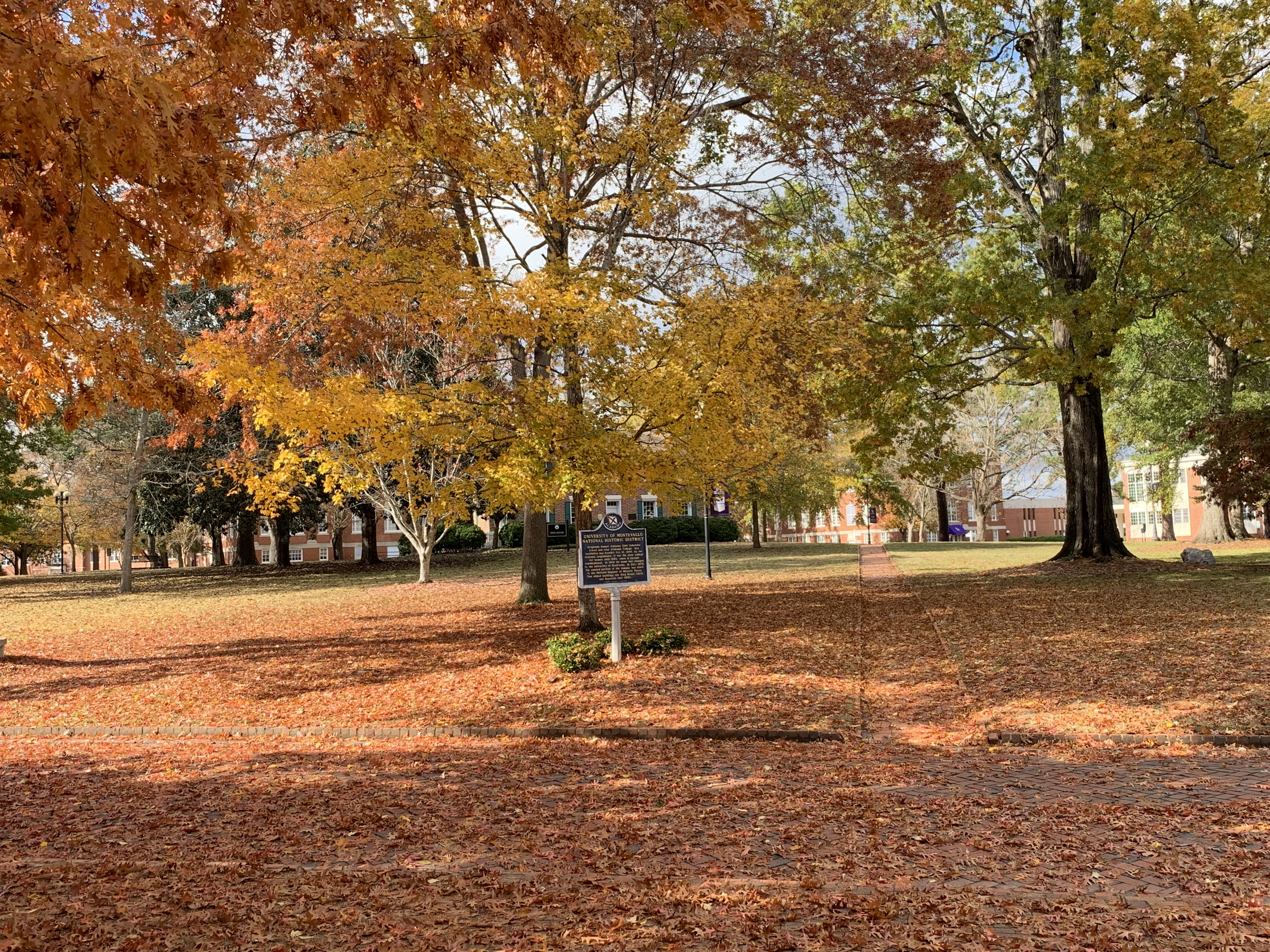
- King Quad at the University of Montevallo

- Location within Alabama
- Location: Bounded by Middle Campus Dr., Oak, Bloch and Middle Sts., Montevallo, Alabama
- Area: 25.7 acres (10.4 ha)
- Built: 1851
- Architectural style: Colonial Revival, Greek Revival, Federal
- NRHP reference No.: 78000509
- Added to NRHP: December 11, 1978

The main part of the campus was designed by the Olmsted Brothers, and the central part is a historic district listed on the National Register of Historic Places. The university opened in October 1896 as the Alabama Girls' Industrial School (AGIS), a women-only technical school that also offered high school-level courses. Annie Kennedy was the first member of the faculty elected at the AGIS. AGIS became the Alabama Girls' Technical Institute in 1911, further adding "and College for Women" in 1919. The school gradually developed as a traditional degree-granting institution, becoming Alabama College, State College for Women in 1923.

The school effectively became coeducational after lobbying by the school's supporters resulted in the Alabama Legislature passing a bill on January 15, 1956, to remove the designation "State College for Women". The first men entered the school that same month. Its student body still maintains a 7:5 ratio of women to men.

In 1965, the board of trustees authorized President D.P. Culp to sign the Certificates of Assurance of Compliance with the Civil Rights Act of 1964. In the fall of 1968, three African American women enrolled in the university. On September 1, 1969, Alabama College was renamed the University of Montevallo.

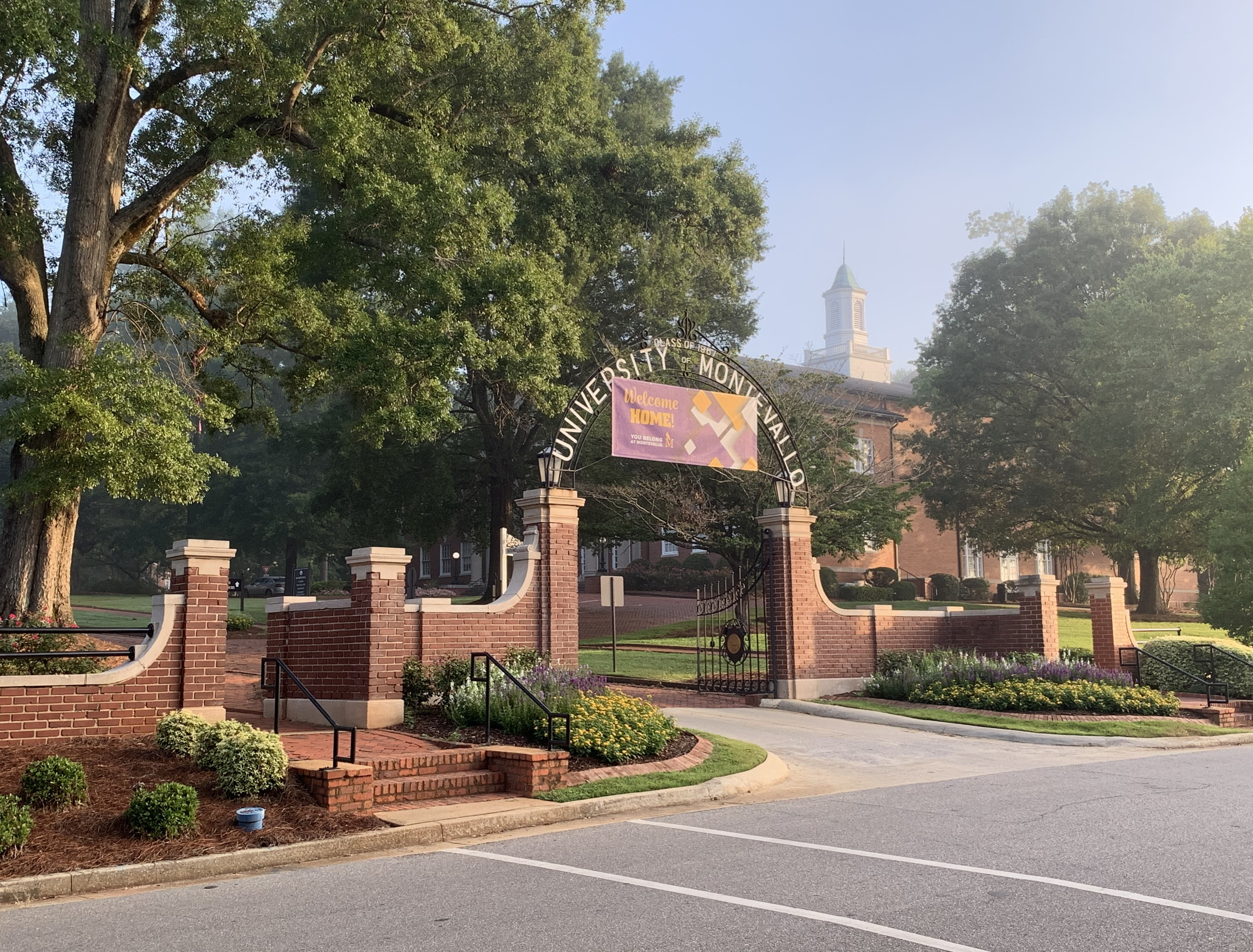
Main entrance to the campus of the University of Montevallo

Montevallo is in the geographic center of Alabama in an area rich with Civil War history. Many of the buildings on campus predate the founding of the college, including King House (reserved for special guests of the campus) and Reynolds Hall (used by the Theater Department and alumni relations). King House was reportedly the first home in Alabama to receive pane glass windows. With nearly 3,000 students, the university has a significant economic impact on the surrounding communities in Shelby County.

== Traditions ==
=== College Night ===
The University of Montevallo's homecoming tradition, called College Night, is a coeducational competition in which students may participate for either the Purple Side or the Gold Side, named after the school's colors. The tradition of College Night began as a celebration of the upcoming renaming of Alabama Girls' Technical Institute to Alabama College. First taking place on March 3, 1919, as a competition between the four classes, the Class of 1919 said that "now that our school is becoming a college, we have begun to take up college stunts."

The main event of College Night is the performance of musical theater productions by each side. The shows are composed, directed, produced, and performed by student participants. The competition also currently involves four athletic events: men's and women's basketball, women's volleyball, and men's ultimate Frisbee.

In honor of A.G.T.I.'s 25th anniversary in 1921, College Night became a competition between two sides, Purple and Gold, instead of a competition between the classes.

In 2000, College Night was declared a "Local Legacy" by the Library of Congress, with an exhibit containing audio recordings of Purple and Gold side songs, photographs, College Night programs, and other artifacts.

=== Crook Week/Senior March ===
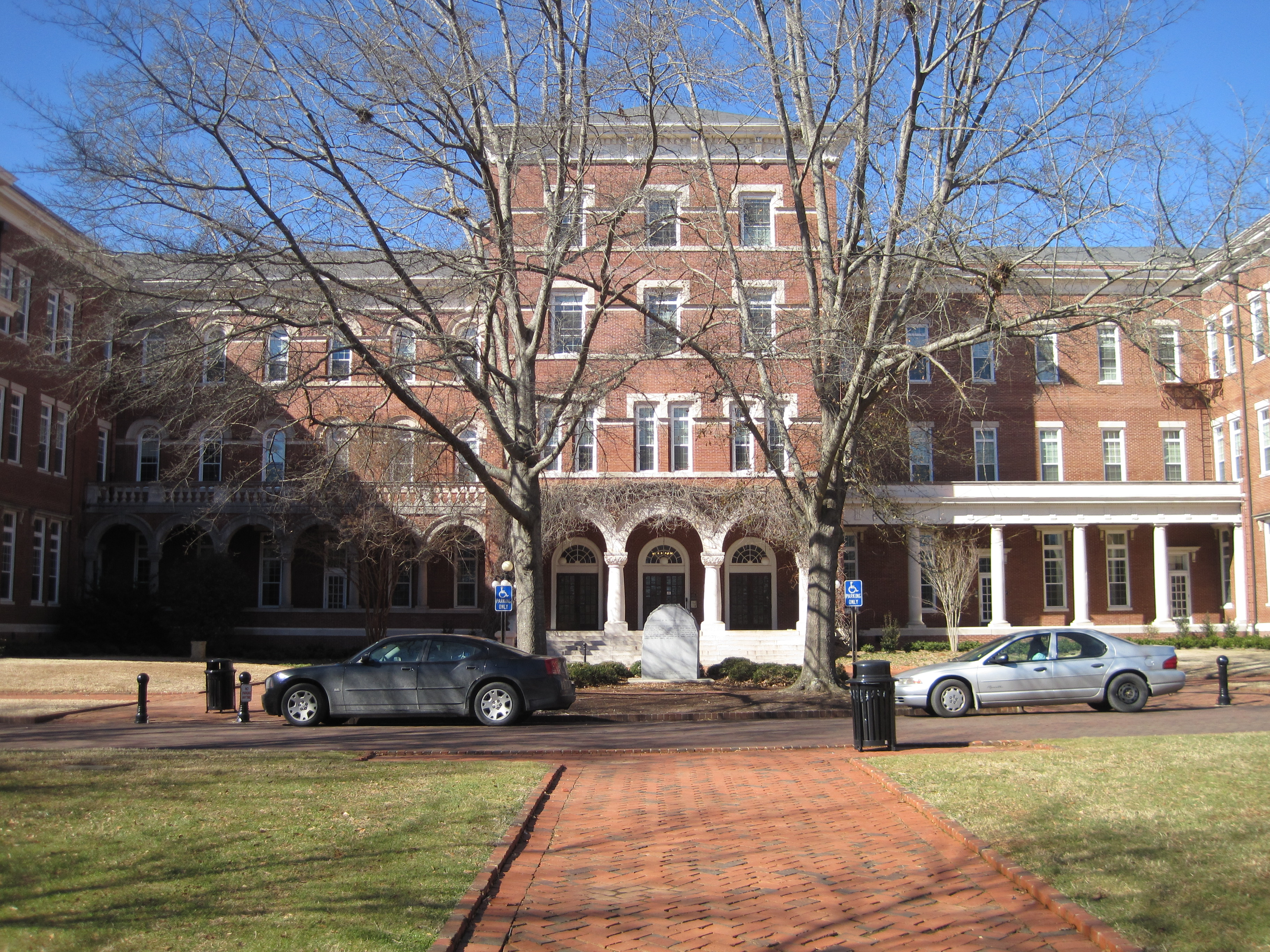
Main Hall, University of Montevallo

Traditionally, Crook Week was a week in late October when the senior class women would hide the "crook"—a staff shaped roughly like a shepherd's crook—and give obscure clues for the underclass women who were to find it.

At the end of Crook Week was Senior March. When the chimes struck thirteen, if the underclass women did not find the crook, the seniors march on them, getting them out of their rooms and onto Main Quad where they would have a shaving cream and water balloon battle. If the underclass women found the crook, they were safe that year. This tradition ended in the 1990s because the administration considered it hazing.

=== Life Raft Debate ===
The Life Raft Debate is an annual event sponsored by the Philosophy Club. The debate has occurred each fall semester since 1998, on the second Thursday in October during the university's Founders' Day commemoration.

In the Life Raft Debate, the audience is asked to imagine that there has been a nuclear war and that they, as the survivors, are setting sail to rebuild society from the ground up. There are a group of professors vying to win the coveted Oar and get on the raft, and only one seat is left. Each professor has to argue that their discipline is the one indispensable area of study that the new civilization will need to flourish.

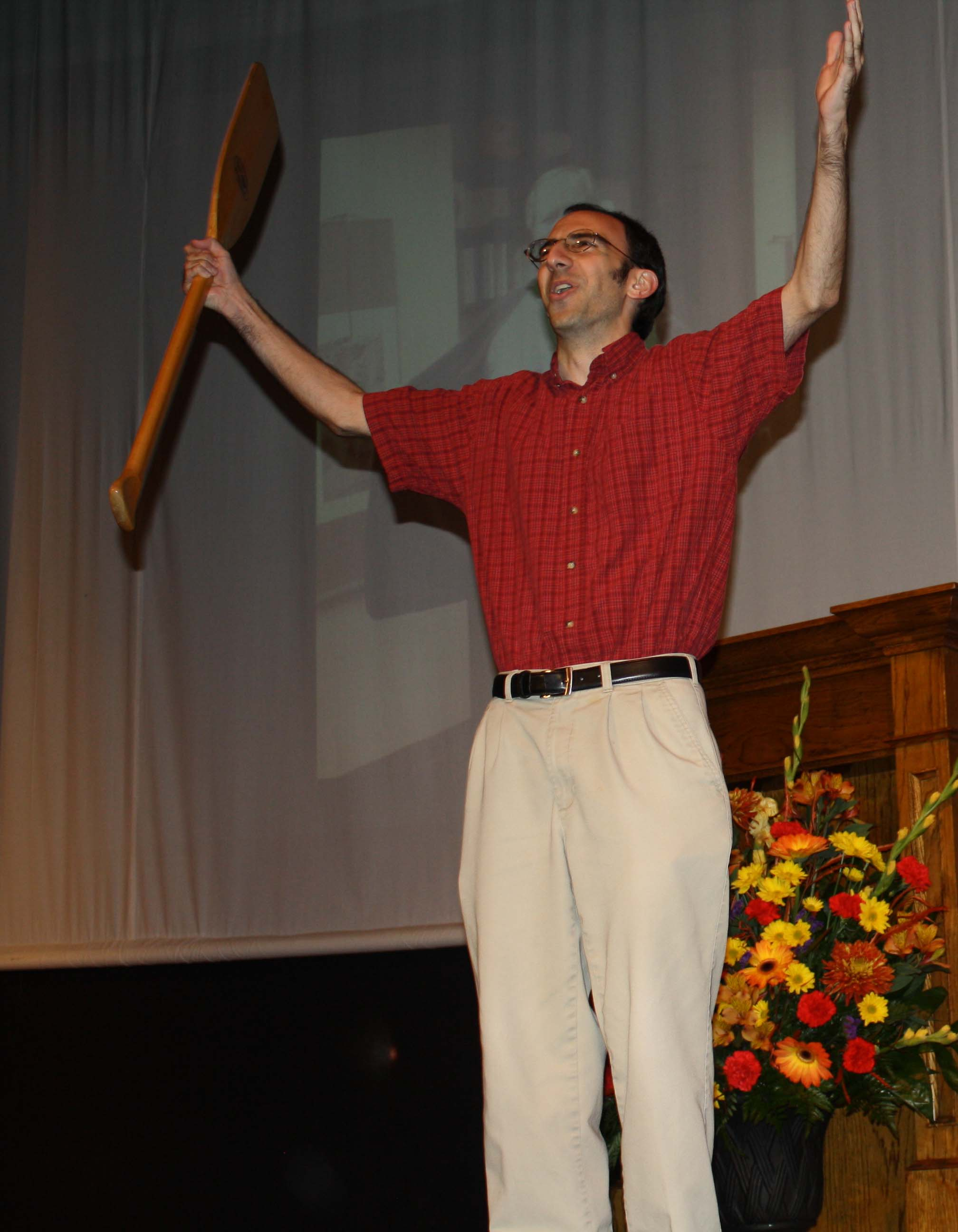
Scott Varagona with the Oar

Each professor gives an introductory account of their discipline then a brief rebuttal to the others. At the end of the debate, the audience votes and the lucky winner claims the Oar and climbs aboard, waving goodbye to the others. Often, a seventh participant, the Devil's Advocate, appears and tries to convince the audience that the entire panel is unworthy and that all should be left behind to drown. In the following year, the defending champion faces five new challengers in a new debate. To date, no one has successfully defended the Oar.

The first event was held in 1998 before an audience of roughly 200 people. Michael Sterner of the Mathematics Department carried the day with an impassioned defense of his discipline, touting both its usefulness and beauty and promising that, if he were to be saved, there would be "no more word problems ever." In the subsequent years the debate's popularity grew to attract more than 800 audience members per year. Following years saw victories by professors from a variety of academic disciplines.

On March 12, 2010, the public radio show This American Life ran a story on the Life Raft Debate entitled "I'd Like to Spank the Academy." The story followed the events of the 2007 Life Raft Debate in which the Devil's Advocate, Jon Smith, a professor in the Department of English, successfully argued that all the panelists should be drowned because they were merely trying to be funny, not to educate or to defend the importance of their respective disciplines. Following the broadcast, several colleges and universities in the United States and abroad began hosting Life Raft Debates of their own.

== Campus resources ==
Undergraduate demographics as of Fall 2023
Race and ethnicity	Total
White	66%
Black	16%
Hispanic	7%
International student	4%
Two or more races	3%
Unknown	2%
Asian	1%
Economic diversity
Low-income (Note: The percentage of students who received an income-based federal Pell grant intended for low-income students.)	41%
Affluent (Note: The percentage of students who are a part of the American middle class at the bare minimum.)	59%

=== James Wylie Shepherd Observatory ===
The James Wylie Shepherd Observatory at the University of Montevallo was opened in the Fall of 2009. The observatory was built on the site of a former construction landfill, now remade into Gentry Springs field. The observatory is a U of M sustainability landmark.

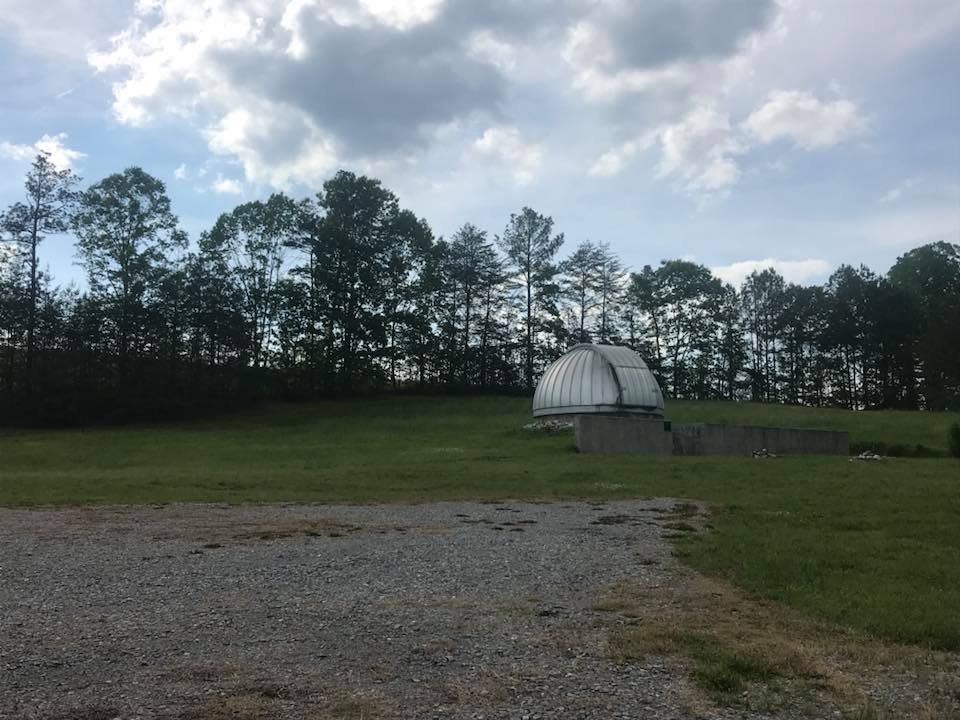
The James Wylie Shepherd Observatory is located roughly three miles from the university campus.

The observatory is located roughly three miles from the main campus on the 150-acre Gentry Springs site owned by the university. The JWSO is capable of astronomical telescopic observation and astrophotography, has a dedicated telescope for solar viewing, and is one of very few observatories in the country that is designed specifically to be completely accessible to people of all disabilities.

=== Ebenezer Swamp Ecological Preserve ===
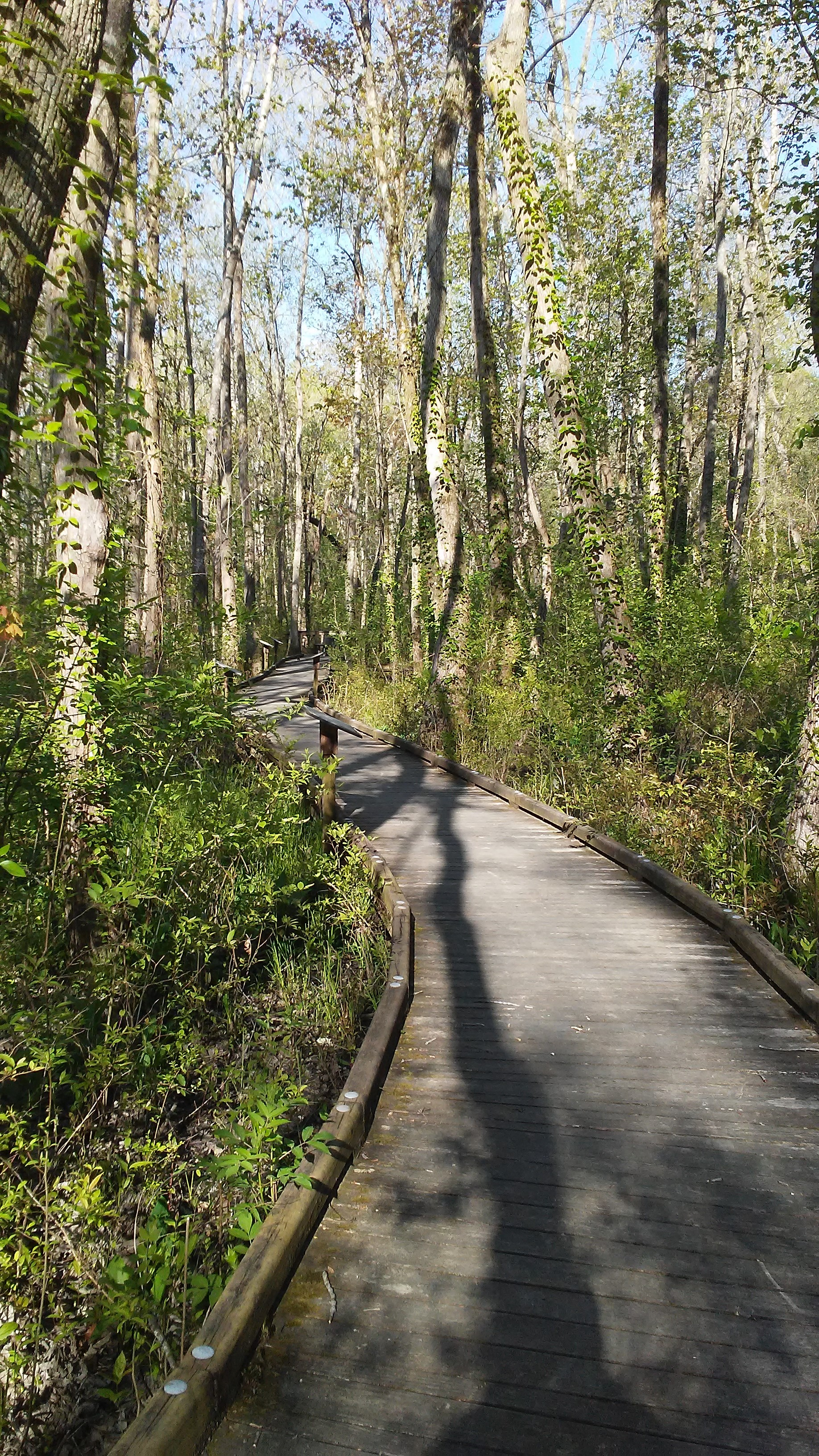
The Ebenezer Swamp Ecological Preserve is located in Shelby County, Alabama. It is maintained by The University of Montevallo for teaching and research.

The University of Montevallo's Ebenezer Swamp consists of approximately 60 acres (240,000 m^{2}) of wooded wetlands and is located on near the headwaters of Spring Creek, approximately 6 miles (9.7 km) northeast of the University in central Alabama.

Spring Creek and Ebenezer Swamp form a portion of the headwaters for the ecologically diverse and environmentally sensitive Cahaba River Watershed. The Cahaba is the longest remaining free-flowing river, has more species of fish per mile than any river in North America and is one of eight river biodiversity hotspots in the U.S.

UM is creating the Ebenezer Swamp Wetlands Interpretive and Research Center (ESWIRC) to focus greater research on wetland ecology and to increase educational opportunities for high school and middle school students from across the state of Alabama. Research goals center on: establishing and maintaining an inventory of plant, animal and fungal species; monitoring water quality, rainfall and stream flow rates; and future studies of wetland ecological processes and the effects of encroachment along the swamp margin. Education goals center on raising the profile of the ecologic importance of wetlands to high school and middle school students, while simultaneously providing them with a sound introduction to the underlying principles of biology.

=== ValloCycle: Montevallo Bike-Share Program ===
Formed through a collaborative partnership between the City of Montevallo and the University of Montevallo, the ValloCycle Bike-Share Program exists as a citywide initiative to enhance overall community walkability and individual citizen engagement with a lifestyle of sustainable, alternative transportation. The ValloCycle Bike-Share Program's primary means of achieving these goals is through its day-to-day operation of the ValloCycle Bike-Share Program, the first county-wide bicycle sharing program in the state of Alabama to offer low-cost bicycle rentals to all the members of its community.

Unlike other nearby campus bike-share programs, ValloCycle bicycle rentals are not limited solely to university students and are also not confined to one location. Rather, bicycle rentals are offered to all residents of Montevallo and the surrounding Shelby County area in three separate check-out locations. Annual membership fees amount to roughly $2 a month for adults and $1 a month per child.

The all-volunteer ValloCycle Board oversees the implementation of a number of other campus and community programs, events, resources and public bicyclist/pedestrian infrastructure enhancements, including the Montevallo "Share the Lane" Initiative, the ValloCycle Town Map Project, and the Montevallo "Tour By Bike". Membership forms are available at ValloCycle's public website, vallocycle.com.

=== Anagama Kiln ===
Montevallo's kiln was hand-built by the ceramics professor Scott Meyer and students beginning in 1999. Fired once or twice a year, the kiln fires for 100 hours and consumes up to 14 cords of split wood.

=== Carmichael Library ===
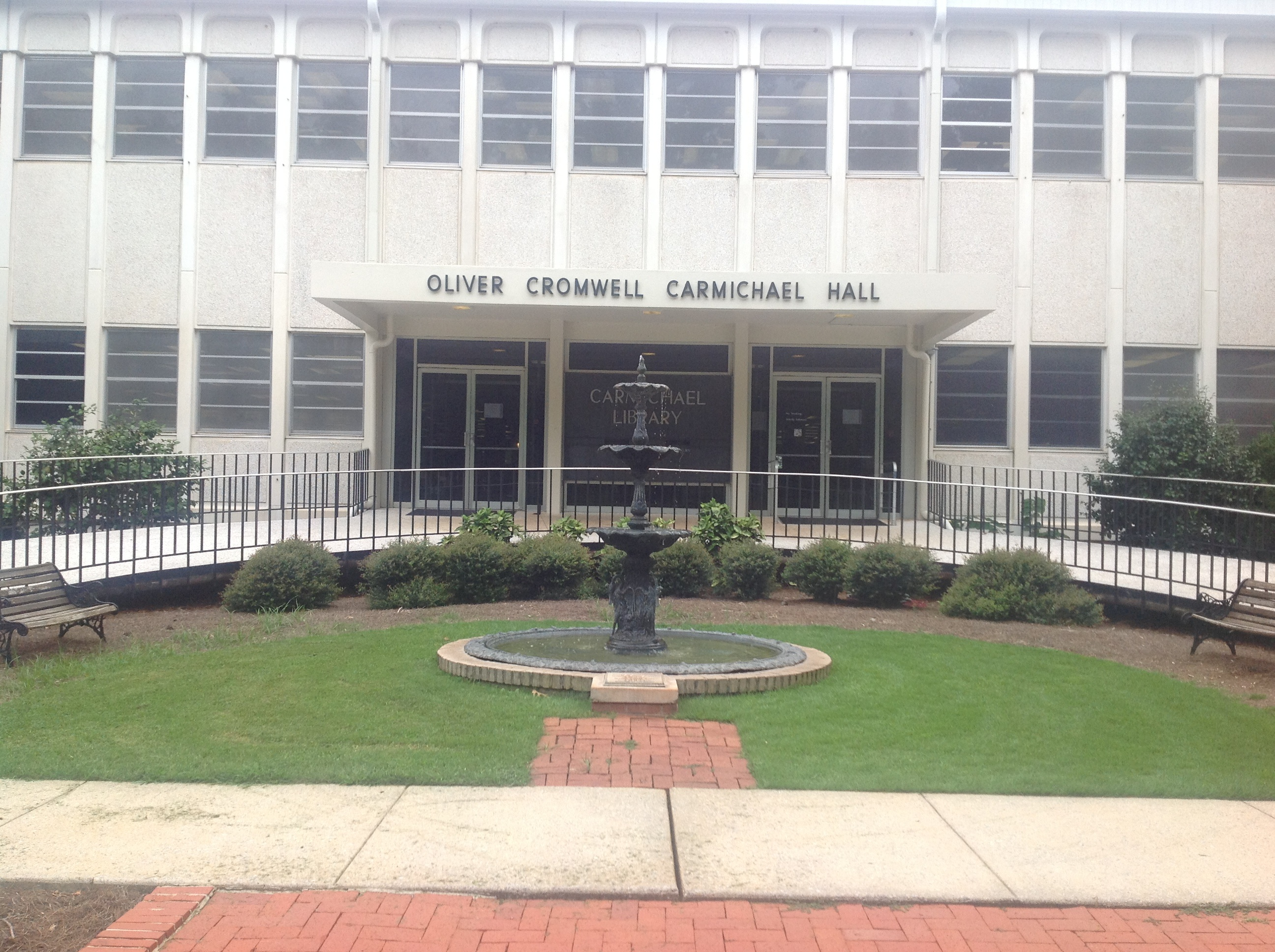
Oliver Cromwell Carmichael Library

Named for Alabama College President Oliver Cromwell Carmichael, the current library opened in 1968 at the corner of Highland and Bloch Streets. The facility features three floors of stacks, meeting spaces, and campus amenities such as the Anna Crawford Milner Archives and Special Collections, the Pat Scales Special Collection Room, the Digital Media Lab, Learning Enrichment Center and the Information Services and Technology Helpdesk. As of 2022, Carmichael Hall houses over 185,000 print titles.

=== Greek life ===
There are several fraternities and sororities on campus. Fraternities include Phi Gamma Delta, Alpha Kappa Lambda and Alpha Tau Omega, while sororities include Delta Gamma, Alpha Gamma Delta, Phi Mu, and Chi Omega.

=== Disc golf course ===
In 2007, The University of Montevallo, in cooperation with the Professional Disc Golf Association, built a full size, 18 hole, disc golf course on the grounds of the campus.

== Athletics ==
The University of Montevallo fields 20 varsity teams that are members of NCAA Division II which currently compete in the Gulf South Conference (GSC).

Men's sports include baseball, basketball, soccer, golf, lacrosse, tennis, track and field, cross-country and wrestling. Women's sports include lacrosse, basketball, soccer, golf, cross-country, tennis, track and field and volleyball. The Falcons were members of the Gulf South Conference previously, from 1995 until 2009. They then competed in the Peach Belt Conference until re-joining the GSC before the 2017–18 academic year.

== Notable faculty and staff ==
- Oliver Carmichael, university administrator and president
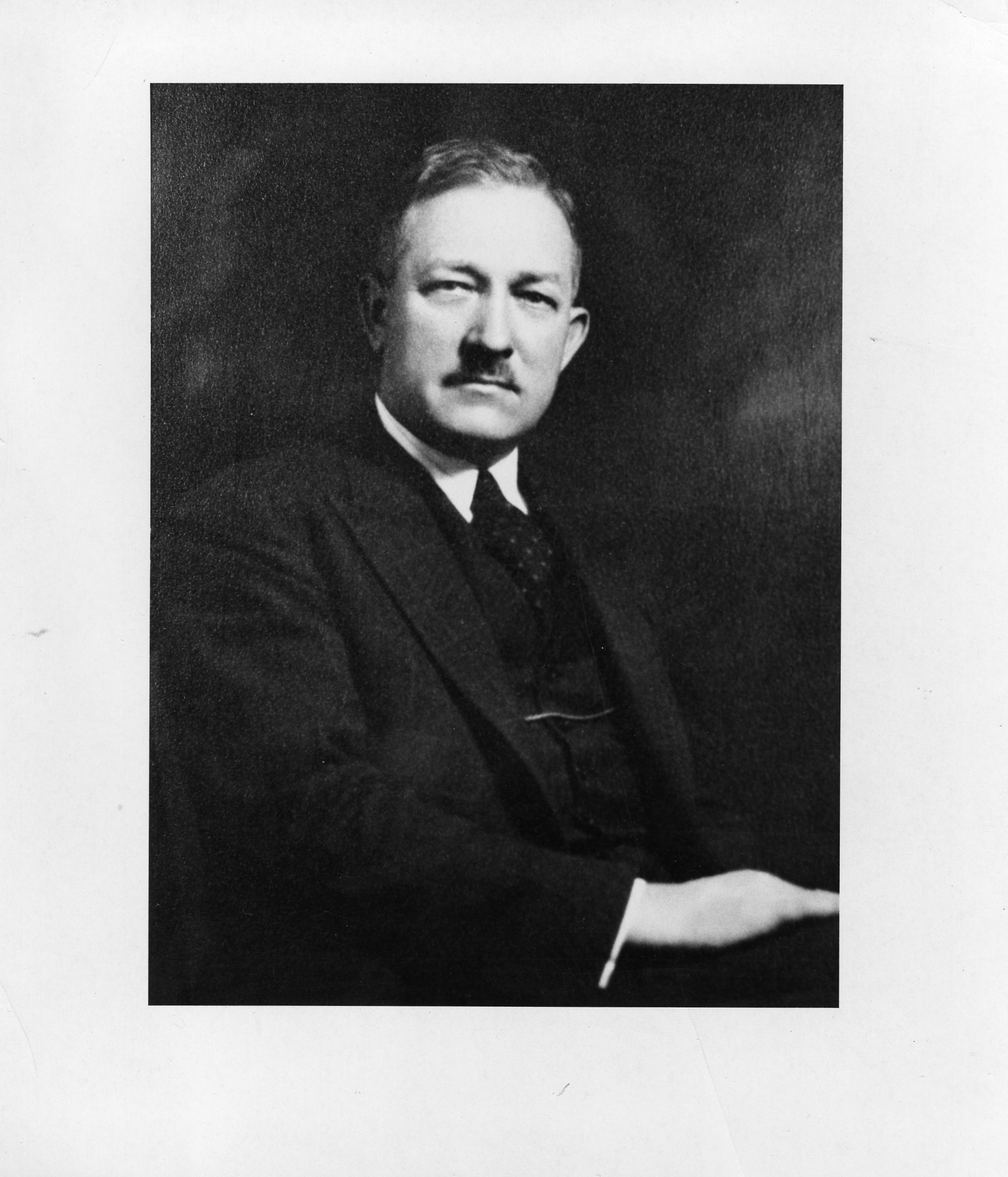
  Carmichael served as the institution's fourth president from 1926-1935.
- Margaret Cuninggim, Dean of Women
- Wilson Fallin, historian
- Annie Kennedy, first member of the faculty elected at the AGIS
- Garnie W. McGinty, historian
- Eugene Sledge, professor of biology and veteran
- John R. Steelman, sociologist and White House Chief of Staff
- Olive Stone, sociologist
- Julia Tutwiler, women's rights advocate and composer of Alabama's official state song

== Notable alumni ==
- Elizabeth B. Andrews, former U.S. Congresswoman for the 3rd District of Alabama and the first woman elected to represent Alabama in the U.S. Congress
- Slade Blackwell, member of the Alabama Senate, 2010-2018
- Beth Chapman, Secretary of State of Alabama, 2007–2013
- Matt Fridy, judge on the Alabama Court of Civil Appeals and served in the Alabama House of Representatives from the 73rd district from 2014 to 2020
- Hannah Godwin, television personality known for The Bachelor and Bachelor in Paradise
- Rusty Greer, baseball player
- Polly Holliday, actress best known for the character of Flo from the television show Alice
- Jo Kittinger, children's book author and speaker
- Rebecca Luker, actress and three-time Tony Award nominee
- Jon Maloney, soccer player
- Willie L. Phillips, Chairman of the Federal Energy Regulatory Commission
- Ray Reach, jazz pianist, vocalist, arranger, composer, and educator
- Annette Shelby, academic
- Doug Sisson, baseball coach
- Rodger Smitherman, Democratic member of the Alabama Senate
- Todd Strange, former mayor of Montgomery, Alabama
- David Howard Thornton, actor
- Jeanne Appleton Voltz, food journalist and cookbook author
- Nancy Worley, former president, Alabama Education Association; Secretary of State of Alabama, 2003–2007; chair, Alabama Democratic Party
