= Annie Kennedy =

Annie Kennedy (July 16, 1851 – June 16, 1918) was an American educator. She was the head teacher and first member of the faculty elected at the Alabama Girls' Industrial School (later, Technical institute; now, University of Montevallo).

== Biography ==
Anne Elizabeth Kennedy was born in Centerville, Alabama, July 16, 1851. She was the daughter of Josiah Sparks and Anne Eliza (McNeill) Kennedy; sister of John Percy Kennedy.

She received her elementary education from the Rev. H. A. Smith, a graduate of Amherst College, and his wife, a graduate of Mount Holyoke College, who conducted a private school at Centerville. Her first college work was given under the instruction of Mr. J. D. Cooper, of Trinity, Pennsylvania, who was also a teacher in Centerville. She later studied at the University of Tennessee, and completed her work for a bachelor's degree in the School of education at the University of Chicago. In addition, she added to her preparation for teaching by normal school correspondence courses.

She entered upon the profession by teaching the children of her neighbors in her hometown. Two years later, she was offered a position in the Centerville school which she accepted. A course of study in Mobile, Alabama followed this experience and she next taught in the Crozier-French school in Knoxville, Tennessee, for one year, followed by a year in the public schools of Union Springs, Alabama. In 1896, she returned to Knoxville, but when the Alabama Girls' Industrial School (later, the Technical Institute; now, the University of Montevallo) was opened, she was the first member of the faculty elected and for 16 years, filled the chairs of English and history.

Anne Elizabeth Kennedy made her home in Centerville. She died June 16, 1918.

== Awards and honors ==
The central wing of the university's main dormitory, Annie Kennedy Hall, is named in her honor.
