= Olive Stone =

American sociologist

Olive "Polly" Matthews Stone (13 January 1897 – 8 November 1977) was an American sociologist whose interests focused on human welfare, race relations, and southern American farmers. Throughout her life, she was actively involved in several Marxist reading groups and financially contributed to union organizing in the Black Belt region.

== Biography ==
Stone was born in Dadeville, Alabama, and attended Huntingdon College in Montgomery, Alabama. She taught at various schools before earning her Ph.D. in sociology from UNC-Chapel Hill in 1939, including Alabama College, Huntingdon College, Brookings Institution, UNC-Chapel Hill, College of William and Mary, and Richmond School of Social Work. She later worked as a professor of sociology at Georgia State College for Women, a professor of sociology and dean at University of Montevallo and as an associate professor at the School of Social Welfare, University of California at Los Angeles. Stone also traveled throughout India, China, and Japan for the Fellowship of Reconciliation during 1931–1932 to observe group relations and tensions.

Stone's involvement in radical politics and civil rights, especially in the 1930s, brought her to several race relations conferences, including the Swarthmore Institute of Race Relations in 1934; the Negro-White Conference at Shaw University in Raleigh, North Carolina in 1934; and the Southern Conference for Human Welfare in Birmingham, Alabama, 1938. She also helped establish the Southern Committee for People's Rights, was involved with the Southern Negro Youth Congress, advocated for the rights of farmers and sharecroppers, and worked with a Montgomery hospitality group for those involved in sharecroppers' union, peace, and civil rights work.
