= James Ronald Walker =

American politician

Ronnie Walker

Member of the Georgia State Senate from the 19th district
- In office 1977–1984
- Succeeded by: Walter S. Ray

Personal details
- Born: June 28, 1947 Telfair County, Georgia, U.S.
- Died: June 2, 2022 (aged 74) Jeff Davis Hospital Hazlehurst, Georgia
- Party: Democratic
- Spouse(s): Carliss E. Cadwell (m. 1969, div. 1990); Dianne Marchant (m. 1992)
- Children: 2
- Education: Georgia Southwestern State University (B.S.)

James Ronald "Ronnie" Walker I (June 28, 1947 – June 2, 2022) was an American politician. He served as a Democratic member for the 19th district of the Georgia State Senate and as sheriff of Telfair County, Georgia.

== Life and career ==
Walker was born in Telfair County, Georgia, the son of Hilda White and James Wimbric Walker. He attended Georgia Southwestern State University and graduated with a Bachelor of Science.

In 1977, Walker was elected to represent the 19th district of the Georgia State Senate. He served until 1984, when he was succeeded by Walter S. Ray. He was sheriff of Telfair County, Georgia, where he served from 1985 until December 31, 1992, when he was term-limited.

Walker was part-owner of Walker Concrete Pipe Company with his father and uncle. He was a lifelong member of McRae United Methodist Church.

Walker was suspected of part owning a cockfighting gambling enterprise and of accepting bribes from cocaine dealers and other criminal. In 1994 Walker was found guilty of conspiring to manufacture, possess and distribute marijuana and was sentenced to serve ten years in prison.

Walker was married to Carliss Cadwell at 19 years of age. They had two children and lived in McRae, Georgia. They divorced after 21 years of marriage.

He later married Dianne Marchant McDuffie, and they lived in Jacksonville, Georgia.

Walker died in June 2022, at the age of 74 from complications of leukemia and liver failure at Jeff Davis Hospital in Hazlehurst, Georgia.
