= Michelle Johnston =

President of Georgia Southwestern State University
- Incumbent
- Assumed office June 1, 2024
- Preceded by: Teresa MacCartney (interim)

President of College of Coastal Georgia
- In office July 2018 – 2024
- Succeeded by: Johnny L. Evans (interim)

Personal details
- Education: University of Alabama; Louisiana State University; Mississippi State University

Michelle R. Johnston is an American academic administrator serving as the president of Georgia Southwestern State University since 2024. She was president of College of Coastal Georgia from 2018 to 2024.

== Life ==
Johnston earned a bachelor's degree in piano performance from the University of Alabama. She completed a master's degree in piano performance at the Louisiana State University. She received a Ph.D. in educational leadership from Mississippi State University. She earned a post-doctorate in marketing and management from the University of Florida.

Johnston worked at the University of Montevallo, the University of Louisiana at Monroe, and Mississippi State University. From 2014 to 2018, she was president of the University of Rio Grande. In July 2018 she became president of the College of Coastal Georgia. She was succeeded by interim president Johnny L. Evans. On June 1, 2024, Johnston became president of Georgia Southwestern State University. She succeeded interim president Teresa MacCartney.

Johnston has been selected as the next president of the University of Montevallo in Montevallo, Alabama after being approved by the UM Board of Trustees during a specially called meeting on May 22, 2026. Johnston will be the first female president in the institution's history.
