= Jon Maloney =

English footballer (born 1985)

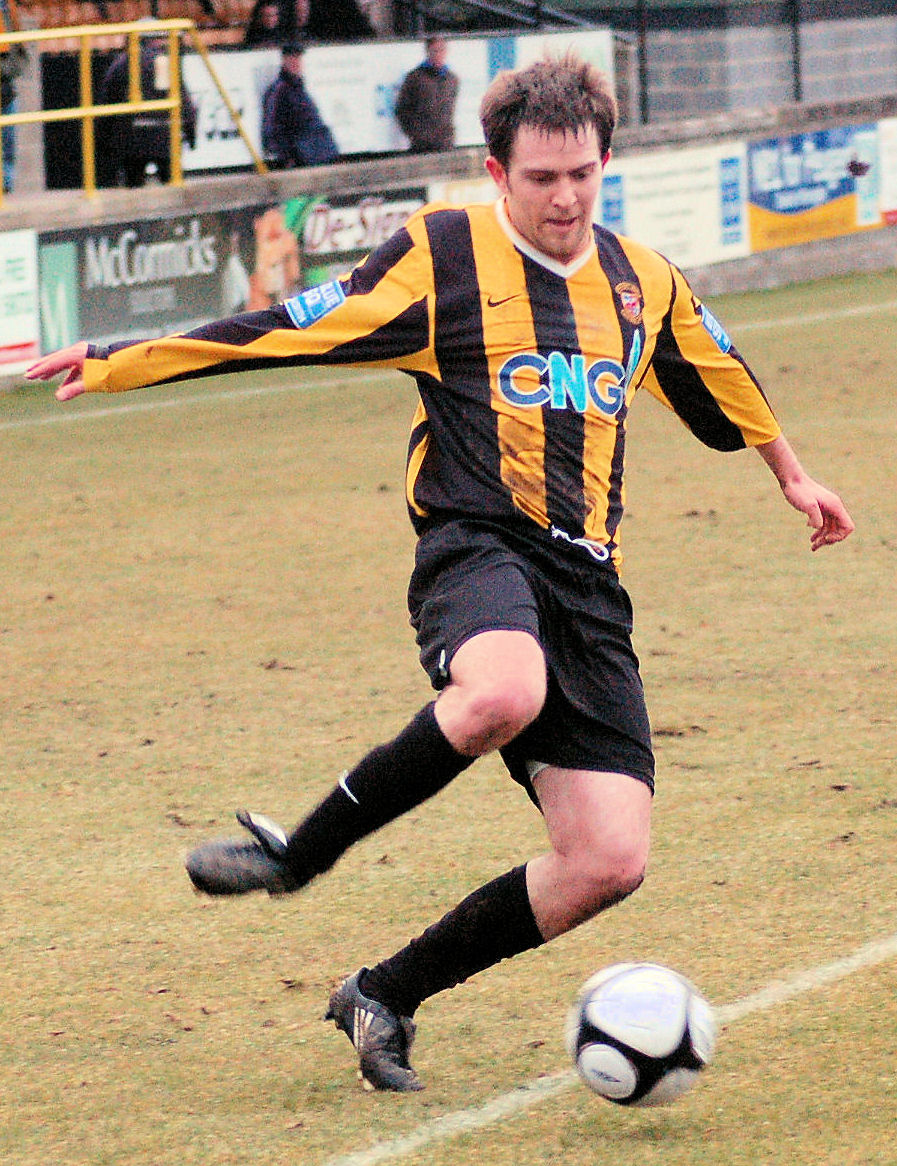
- Maloney playing for Harrogate Town

Personal information
- Full name: Jonathan Duncan Maloney
- Date of birth: 3 March 1985 (age 41)
- Place of birth: Leeds, England
- Height: 6 ft 0 in (1.83 m)
- Positions: Defender; striker

Team information
- Current team: Harrogate Railway Athletic

Senior career*
Years	Team	Apps	(Gls)
2003–2005	Doncaster Rovers	3	(0)
2005	→ York City (loan)	13	(3)
2005–2009	University of Montevallo	75	(70)
2009–2010	Harrogate Town	33	(1)
2010–	Harrogate Railway Athletic	150	(24)
- * Club domestic league appearances and goals as of 13:00, 29 August 2014 (UTC)

Jonathan Duncan Maloney (born 3 March 1985) is an English footballer who plays for Wetherby Athletic as a defender although he has also been utilised as a striker.

== Career ==
Born in Leeds, West Yorkshire, Maloney started his career at Doncaster Rovers. He joined York City on a month's loan on 5 January 2005. This loan was extended for another month in late January. This was extended for a third month in late February. Maloney was released by Doncaster at the end of the 2004–05 season.

Following his release by Doncaster, Maloney went to the United States to play for the University of Montevallo men's soccer team. After four years at the university he returned to England and was invited to pre-season training with former club Doncaster, although he stated he was looking to earn a contract with another former club, York.

Following a successful trial he signed for Conference North side Harrogate Town on 27 July. Maloney would make 33 appearances, scoring his only goal of the season against Vauxhall Motors. He went on to sign for Harrogate Railway Athletic.
