= Georgia Southwestern State University =

Public university in Americus, Georgia, US

Coordinates: 32.057°N 84.218°W

- Former names: Third District Agricultural and Mechanical School (1906–1926); Third District Agricultural and Normal College (1926–1932); Georgia Southwestern College (1932–1996)
- Type: Public university
- Established: 1906; 120 years ago
- Parent institution: University System of Georgia
- Endowment: $35.8 million (2025)
- President: Michelle Johnston
- Students: 3,408 (fall 2023)
- Undergraduates: 2,753 (fall 2023)
- Postgraduates: 655 (fall 2023)
- Location: Americus, Georgia, U.S.
- Campus: 250 acres (100 ha)
- Colors: (Navy blue and gold)
- Nickname: Hurricanes
- Sporting affiliations: NCAA Division II; Peach Belt Conference
- Mascot: "Surge"
- Website: gsw.edu

Georgia Southwestern State University (GSW) is a state public university in Americus, Georgia, United States. Founded as the Third District Agricultural and Mechanical School in 1906, the university was established and is administrated by the Georgia Board of Regents of the University System of Georgia. The historic core of the campus has been listed as a historic district on the National Register of Historic Places, since 2007.

== History ==
In 1906, the Georgia General Assembly passed a resolution establishing one agricultural and mechanical school in each of the state's eleven congressional districts. Signed by Governor Joseph M. Terrell, the bill left the location of the schools up to the local communities that offered the most financial support. Oversight of the schools came from the Georgia State College of Agriculture and a local board consisting of one member from each county in the school's congressional district. Funding for the schools came from taxes and fees associated with fertilizer and oil inspections.

=== Third District Agricultural and Mechanical School (1906–1926) ===
From the 15 counties that made up Georgia's Third Congressional District, Sumter County pledged the most support for a new school: 300 acres of land along the Seaboard Airline Railroad, $40,000, and water supply.

From 1907 to 1926, the Third District Agricultural and Mechanical School prepared students for farm work. The minimum age for admission was thirteen years old for girls and fourteen years old for boys. The curriculum for boys included plants, soils, animals, fertilizers, construction, concrete, and other physical skills. The curriculum for girls included many of the same subjects as boys as well as courses on household skills from cooking and sewing to sanitation and first aid.

=== Third District Agricultural and Normal College (1926–1932) ===
In 1924, the school's trustees authorized a one-year curriculum for teachers and eliminated one year from the A&M curriculum. Two years later, the Georgia General Assembly converted the school into a teacher's college and changed its name to the Third District Agricultural and Normal College. The State Department of Education granted teacher certification to all students who completed the teacher training program.

=== Georgia Southwestern College (1932–1996) ===
The college joined the University System of Georgia (USG) in 1932 along with other state-supported institutions of higher learning in Georgia. The newly formed USG was also placed under the jurisdiction of the Board of Regents. Now a member of the USG, Georgia Southwestern College continues to offer its two-year curriculum.

The Board of Regents approved Georgia Southwestern College to transition to a four-year institution in 1964. The first bachelor's degrees were conferred in June 1968. The name of the institution was changed to Georgia Southwestern State University in July 1996.

Since becoming a four-year institution, Georgia Southwestern has developed several master's programs over the years. A Master of Education degree was approved by the Board of Regents in 1973, followed by a Specialist in Education degree in 1982. The Master of Science in Administration was made part of the curriculum in 1983. The Master of Science in Computer Science was added in the Spring of 1986, and the Master of Business Administration was added to the curriculum in 2003. Most recently, the Master of Arts in English was added in the fall of 2011, and the Master Science in Nursing (online) was added in the fall of 2012.

== Academics ==
Georgia Southwestern's academic degrees are offered through four colleges, which include the following:

=== The College of Arts and Sciences ===
The College of Arts and Sciences at GSW offers undergraduate degrees and a Master of Arts degree. It is the only university in the USG with an undergraduate art program that has a concentration in glassblowing.

=== College of Business and Computing ===
The College of Business and Computing offers the Bachelor of Business Administration, Master of Business Administration, Bachelor of Science degrees, and the Master of Science in computer science. The college is accredited by the Association to Advance Collegiate Schools of Business.

=== College of Education ===
The College of Education is accredited by the National Council for Accreditation of Teacher Education (NCATE). All initial teacher preparation programs are approved by the Georgia Professional Standards Commission (PSC). The school offers bachelors, masters, and specialist degrees.

=== College of Nursing and Health Sciences ===
The College of Nursing and Health Sciences offers a Bachelor of Science in Nursing (BSN) degree through:

- Generic
- RN to BSN
- Accelerated BSN
- Master of Science in Nursing (online)

There is a Georgia Southwestern Association of Nursing Students and a chapter of Sigma Theta Tau, Mu Pi.

The two buildings which house the College of Nursing and Health Sciences and related colleges are together known as the Rosalynn Carter Health and Human Sciences Complex.

=== Dual and cooperative programs ===
Georgia Southwestern and the Georgia Institute of Technology offer a dual-degree program in engineering leading to a bachelor's degree in science or mathematics from Georgia Southwestern and a bachelor's degree in engineering from Georgia Tech. The university also offers cooperative programs with South Georgia Technical College and several two-year institutions within the university system, culminating in a baccalaureate degree from Georgia Southwestern.

== Athletics ==
The Georgia Southwestern State (GSW) athletic teams are called the Hurricanes. The university is a member of the Division II level of the National Collegiate Athletic Association (NCAA), primarily competing in the Peach Belt Conference (PBC) since the 2006–07 academic year. The Hurricanes previously competed in the Southern States Athletic Conference (SSAC; formerly known as Georgia–Alabama–Carolina Conference (GACC) until after the 2003–04 school year) of the National Association of Intercollegiate Athletics (NAIA) from 1999–2000 to 2005–06.

Football was played at the university between 1983 and 1989. The men's tennis program was discontinued in 2019, while men's cross country was added. GSW competes in ten intercollegiate varsity sports: Men's sports include baseball, basketball, cross country, golf and soccer; while women's sports include basketball, cross country, soccer, softball, and tennis. Club sports include eSports.

== Facilities ==
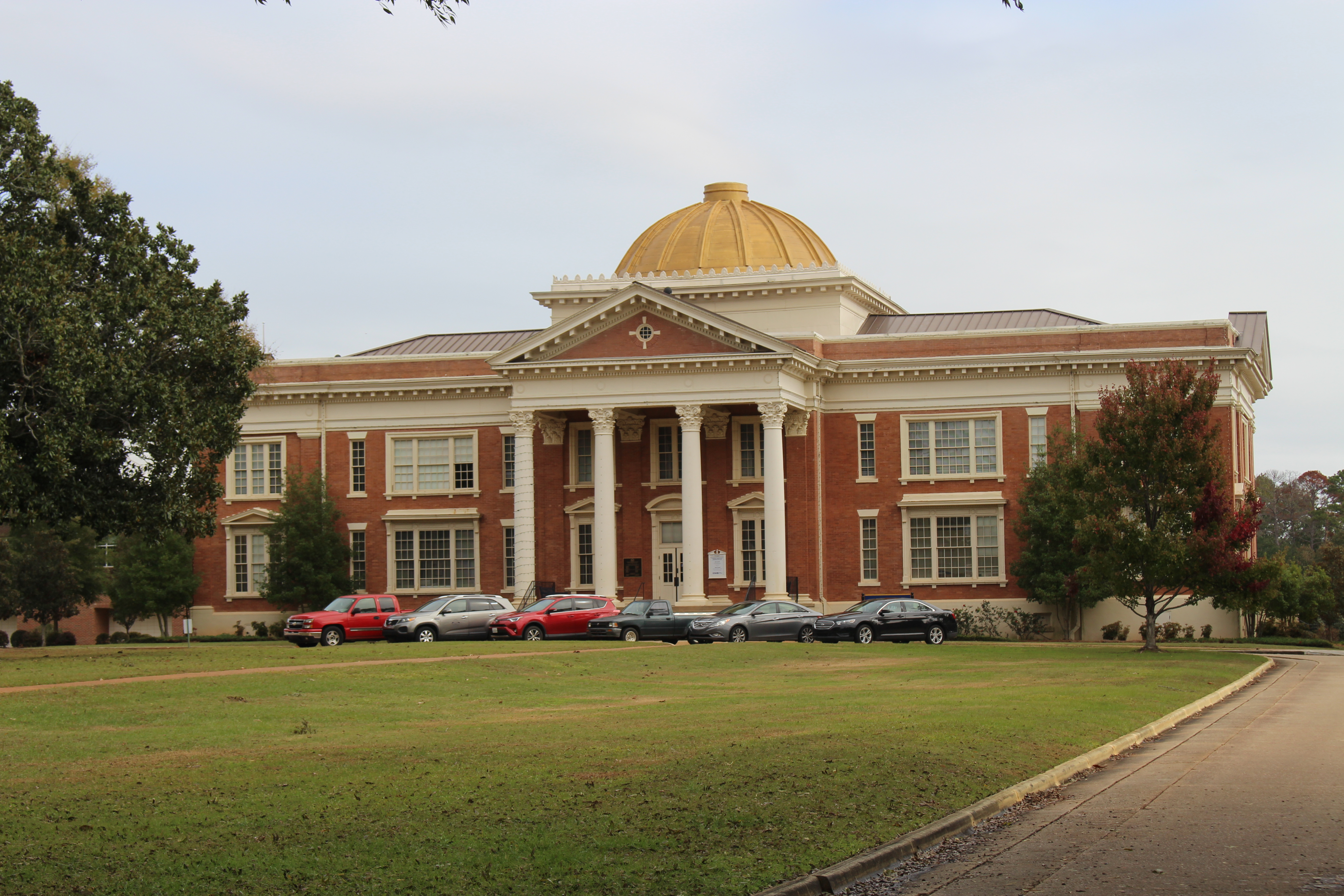
Administration building

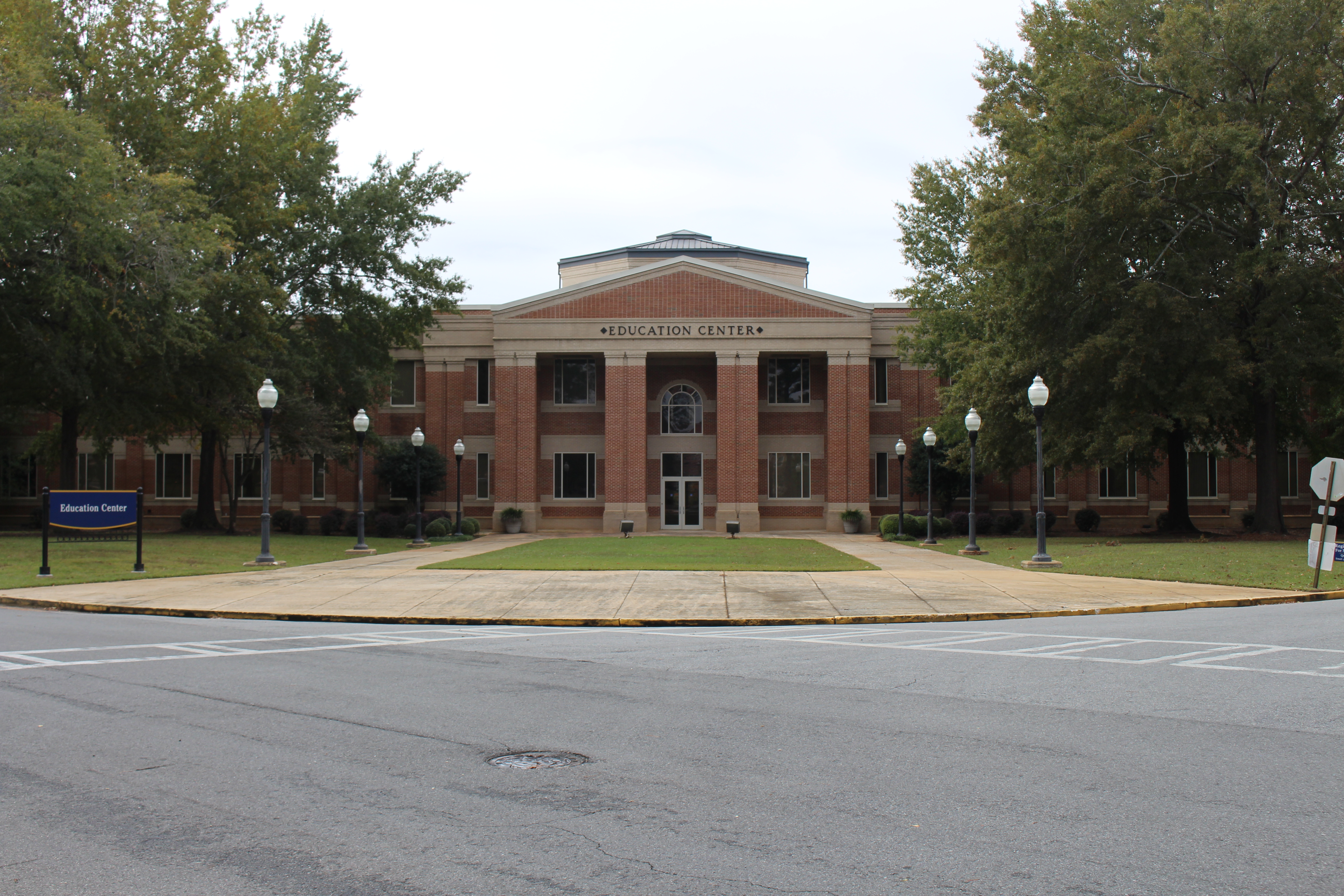
Education Center

GSW has four sets of dorm complexes, most of which bear tree-related monikers.

All freshmen are housed in Southwestern Oaks 1 and 2. The Oaks facilities offer both shared and private bedroom suites and semi-private bathrooms. Freshmen are allowed to park cars on campus in the parking lot located next to Oaks 1 and 2. Southwestern Oaks is also home to GSW's First Year Experience Program.

Southwestern Pines offers apartment-style housing for upperclassmen. Southwestern Magnolia offers private bedroom suites for upperclassman students.

=== Library ===
Georgia Southwestern is home to the James Earl Carter Library, named in honor of the father of former President Jimmy Carter. In addition to the library's own collection, books and other materials may be borrowed from other University System of Georgia libraries through interlibrary loan. The James Earl Carter Library also has a cooperative lending agreement with the local Lake Blackshear Regional Library and the South Georgia Technical College Library.

Other services and materials available to students through the library are audio-visual materials, microfiche documents and current newspapers through the Education Resources Information Center (ERIC), and select government documents. The Library also has computer workstations and a computer lab.

=== Student Success Center ===
The Student Success Center (SSC) houses several recreational facilities for the campus. The GSW Fitness Center is located on the first floor of the Student Success Center. In addition to the fitness center, the SSC is the location of several racquetball courts, the intramural basketball court, a rock-climbing wall, and a Chick-fil-A/Boar's Head restaurant.

=== Marshall Student Center ===
The Marshall Student Center is the location of the university cafeteria; Higher Grounds Café, a small coffee shop; Provisions on Demand (P.O.D.), a convenience store; the university bookstore; and the campus post office.

== Third District A & M School – Georgia Southwestern College Historic District ==
- Third District A & M School--Georgia Southwestern College Historic District
- U.S. National Register of Historic Places
- U.S. Historic district
- Location: 800 Wheatley St., Americus, Georgia
- Area: 13 acres (5.3 ha)
- Built: 1906
- Architect: Haralson Bleckley, et al.
- Architectural style: Colonial Revival, Classical Revival
- NRHP reference No.: 07001002
- Added to NRHP: September 27, 2007

The Third District A & M School–Georgia Southwestern College Historic District is located on the current Georgia Southwestern State University campus within the city limits of Americus approximately two miles southeast of the downtown business district. It is a 13 acres (5.3 ha) historic district in the central core of a larger university campus, and contains eight contributing properties.

- Wheatley Administration Building (1918)
- Collum I (1951–1952)
- Crawford Wheatley Hall (1912)
- Newman Alumni Center (1915)
- Sanford Hall (1937–1939)
- Morgan Hall (1937–1939)
- Florrie Chappell Gymnasium (1939)
- Jackson Hall (1956)

== Student life ==
Undergraduate demographics as of Fall 2023
Race and ethnicity	Total
White	54%
Black	34%
Hispanic	5%
Two or more races	3%
Asian	1%
International student	1%
Economic diversity
Low-income (Note: The percentage of students who received an income-based federal Pell grant intended for low-income students.)	48%
Affluent (Note: The percentage of students who are a part of the American middle class at the bare minimum.)	52%

=== Organizations ===
GSW has many major-related clubs and organizations including the American Institute of Professional Geologists Student Chapter, the GSW Association of Nursing Students (GSWANS), Chemistry Club, History Club, Geology Club, Psychology/Sociology Club, Exercise Science and Wellness Club, and more. Campus ministries include the Presbyterian Student Center, the Wesley Foundation, the Baptist Collegiate Ministry (BCM), and the non-denominational Christian Student Center (CSC). Athletic clubs and organizations include the Outdoor Club as well as an active Campus Recreation and Intramural Sports program featuring intramural flag football and basketball.

Honor societies include the Alpha Lambda Delta Honor Society for first-year students with a GPA of 3.5 or higher, Epsilon Delta Lambda for online students, the National Honor Society for Leadership and Success (Sigma Alpha Pi) and Alpha Psi Omega, the National Theatre Honor Society.

GSW has several organizations in media and arts including the Sou’Wester, the student newspaper; Hurricane Watch, GSW's student-produced video organization; and Sirocco, GSW's magazine for the arts.

Georgia Southwestern has the following sororities and fraternities:

Interfraternity Council

- Chi Phi
- Kappa Sigma
- Sigma Chi

Panhellenic Council

- Kappa Delta
- Zeta Tau Alpha

National Panhellenic Council

- Alpha Kappa Alpha sorority
- Kappa Alpha Psi fraternity
- Alpha Phi Alpha fraternity
- Delta Sigma Theta sorority
- Omega Psi Phi fraternity
- Sigma Gamma Rho sorority
- Zeta Phi Beta sorority

== Institutes ==
=== The Rosalynn Carter Institute for Caregiving ===
Former First Lady Rosalynn Carter is the Board Chair of the Rosalynn Carter Institute (RCI) at Georgia Southwestern State University. The RCI was established in 1987. The Institute focuses its work on both family and professional caregivers for individuals living with chronic illness and disabilities, limitations related to aging, and other health concerns.

Operation Family Caregiver (OFC)—an RCI program launched in 2012—is a one-on-one support program for military families with traumatic experiences and/or a physical disability.

== Accreditation ==
Georgia Southwestern State University is accredited by the Commission on Colleges of the Southern Association of Colleges and Schools to award associate, baccalaureate, masters, and specialist degrees.

== Notable people ==
=== Alumni ===
- Griffin B. Bell (1936), former U.S. Attorney General under President Jimmy Carter
- Dean Burke (1977), commissioner of Georgia Department of Community Health
- Major General Thomas M. Carden, Jr (1992), The Adjutant General of Georgia
- Hugh Carter, politician and first cousin of Jimmy Carter
- Jimmy Carter, former president of the United States
- Rosalynn Smith Carter (1946), wife of Jimmy Carter and former First Lady of the United States
- Jaha Dukureh (2013), women's rights activist
- Quentin Fulks (2012), campaign manager
- Gerald Greene (1977), member of the Georgia House of Representatives
- The Honorable Robert H. Jordan (1936), former Chief Justice of the Georgia Supreme Court
- Lucas Knecht, youngest ever international soccer player for the Northern Mariana Islands
- Mary Elizabeth Lado (2001), professional figure competitor
- Vincent Norrman, Swedish professional golfer
- Alan Powell (politician) (1973)
- Gloria Carter Spann, sister of former United States President Jimmy Carter
- Etchu Tabe, American soccer player
- James Ronald Walker (1971), former member of the Georgia State Senate
- Dick West (baseball), former professional baseball player

=== Faculty ===
- Michelle Johnston, 2024-present
