= Doug Sisson =

American baseball coach (born 1963)

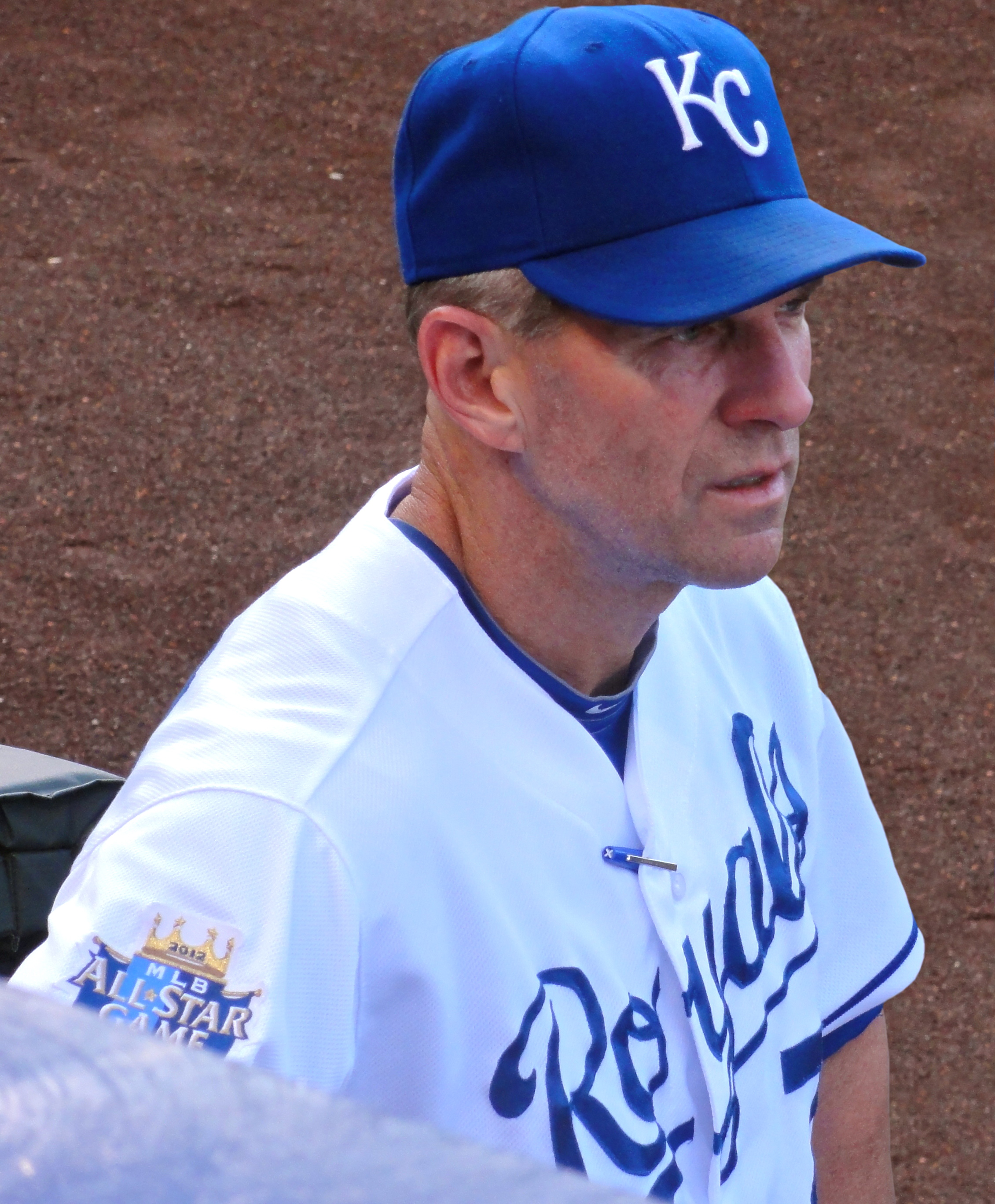
- Sisson with the Kansas City Royals in 2012

Chicago White Sox
- Coach
- Born: September 20, 1963 (age 62); Titusville, Florida, U.S.
- Bats: Right Throws: Right
- Stats at Baseball Reference

Teams
- As coach: Kansas City Royals (2011–2012); Chicago White Sox (2024)

Douglas Dean Sisson (born September 20, 1963) is an American professional baseball coach in the Chicago White Sox organization. This is his 30th season managing, coaching or working in professional baseball. He currently serving as a special assistant to the senior vice president/general manager. He has previously served as a coach, manager, and executive, working at the college, minor league, and major league levels. He served as the first base coach for the Kansas City Royals from 2011 to 2012 and is often credited with creating the style of play that led the Royals to back-to-back World Series. He served as the bench coach for the Chicago White Sox in 2024.

== Career ==
Sisson played baseball at Rollins College and the University of Montevallo.

He played professionally for two seasons. He then served as a minor league manager for the Texas Rangers, Anaheim Angels, and Montreal Expos organizations, winning several championships and Manager of the Year awards. He served as the associate head coach of the Georgia Bulldogs baseball team in 2006 and 2007.

After coaching at Georgia, Sisson served as the field coordinator for the Royals' minor league system. He was promoted to the major league coaching staff prior to the 2011 season.

Sisson was released of his major league coaching duties with the Kansas City Royals on August 4, 2012.

On August 8, 2024, Sisson was named interim bench coach for the Chicago White Sox following the firing of Charlie Montoyo.

He was named the Special Assistant to the Senior Vice President/General Manager for the 2025 season.

== Personal life ==
Sisson, his wife, Crickett, and daughters Tori and Delaney live in Auburn, Alabama.
