= CommuteSmart =

CommuteSmart is a program of the Regional Planning Commission of Greater Birmingham, Alabama, which works with employers and commuters to reduce traffic congestion and improve air quality in Jefferson and Shelby Counties.

== Description ==
Federally funded and started in 1999, CommuteSmart uses an online ride-matching database to help residents and workers in greater Birmingham get to work through carpooling, vanpooling, bicycling, walking, taking transit or teleworking.

According to the American Lung Association State of the Air: 2009 report, Birmingham ranks as the fifth most-polluted city for particle pollution and in the top 25 most-polluted cities for ozone

== Programs ==
The report recommends that individuals drive less as a way to improve air quality in their area, as automobile emissions contribute to air pollution

CommuteSmart offers the following programs and services to commuters and employers.

GetGreen

- Commuters who live or work in Jefferson and Shelby Counties can earn $2 a day, up to $120 over three months, for every day they use a qualified commute alternative instead of driving alone. These include carpooling, bicycling, walking, taking transit and teleworking.

Commuter Club

- Workers and residents already using a commute alternative can join the Commuter Club. As a participant, commuters can earn gift cards for logging 20 qualified clean commutes in a three-month period. Carpools are eligible for one gift card per member. The program is open to anyone who works or lives in Jefferson and Shelby Counties.

Emergency Ride Home (ERH)

- The Emergency Ride Home (ERH) program provides up to five free rides home each year for carpoolers and vanpoolers in the event of an unexpected situation, such as illness, a family emergency or unscheduled overtime.

Vanpooling

- Vanpools are groups of seven to 15 co-workers, friends or neighbors who ride a van to and from work. By splitting the cost of fuel, maintenance and insurance costs for the van, riders can reduce commuting costs.

== Key Personnel ==
- Ricki Hall, Project Manager
- Brian Atkinson, Business Outreach Manager
- Jeniese Hosey, Outreach Coordinator
- Lisa Smith, Special Projects Coordinator
- Kelly Leake, Vanpool Coordinator
