= Index of Alabama-related articles =

The location of the state of Alabama in the United States of America

The following is an alphabetical list of articles related to the U.S. state of Alabama.

== 0–9 ==
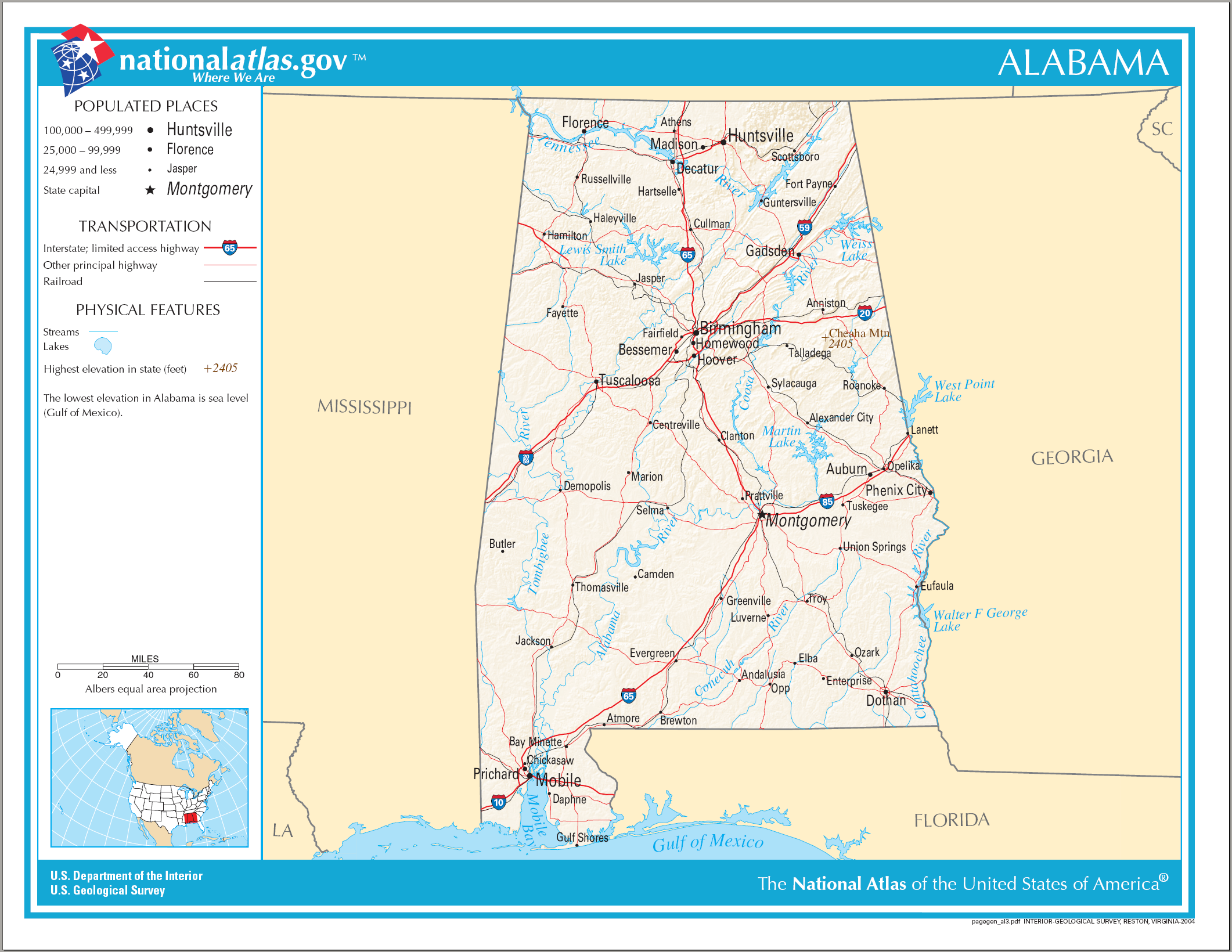
An enlargeable map of the state of Alabama

- .al.us – Internet second-level domain for the state of Alabama
- 22nd state to join the United States of America
- 31st parallel north
- 32nd parallel north
- 33rd parallel north
- 34th parallel north
- 35th parallel north
- 85th meridian west
- 87th meridian west
- 88th meridian west

== A ==
- Abortion in Alabama
- Adams-Onís Treaty of 1819
- Adjacent states:
  - State of Florida
  - State of Georgia
  - State of Mississippi
  - State of Tennessee
- Agriculture in Alabama
- Airports in Alabama
- AL – United States Postal Service postal code for the state of Alabama
- Alabama website
  - Category:Alabama
    - commons:Category:Alabama
      - commons:Category:Maps of Alabama
- Alabama Academy of Honor
- Alabama Clean Water Partnership
- Alabama Cooperative Extension System
- Alabama Highway Patrol
- Alabama in the American Civil War, 1861–1865
- Alabama Jubilee Hot Air Balloon Classic
- Alabama real estate bubble of the 1810s
- Alabama Shakespeare Festival
- Alabama Sports Festival
- Alabama State Capitol
- Alabama Symphony Orchestra
- The Alabama Theatre
- Alys Robinson Stephens Performing Arts Center (Home of the Alabama Symphony Orchestra), Birmingham
- American Village, Montevallo
- Amusement parks in Alabama
- Arboreta in Alabama
  - commons:Category:Arboreta in Alabama
- Archaeology in Alabama
  - Category:Archaeological sites in Alabama
    - commons:Category:Archaeological sites in Alabama
- Architecture in Alabama
- Area codes in Alabama
- Art museums and galleries in Alabama
  - commons:Category:Art museums and galleries in Alabama
- Astronomical observatories in Alabama
  - commons:Category:Astronomical observatories in Alabama
- Attorney General of the State of Alabama

== B ==
- Battle of Athens (1864)
- Battle of Cherokee Station
- Battle of Columbus (1865)
- Battle of Day's Gap
- Battle of Decatur
- Battle of Ebenezer Church
- Battle of Fort Blakeley
- Battle of Mobile Bay
- Battle of Munford
- Battle of Newtown
- Battle of Selma
- Battle of Spanish Fort
- Battle of Sulphur Creek Trestle
- Bayfest, Mobile's Music Festival
- Ben E. May, Mobile philanthropist
- Big Spring Jam
- Birmingham, Alabama
- Birmingham Jefferson Convention Complex, Birmingham
- Birmingham Astronomical Society
- Birmingham Civil Rights Institute
- Birmingham Museum of Art
- Birmingham riot of 1963
- Black Belt
- Bloody Tuesday (1964)
- Botanical gardens in Alabama
  - commons:Category:Botanical gardens in Alabama
- Bryant–Denny Stadium, Tuscaloosa
- Buildings and structures in Alabama
  - commons:Category:Buildings in Alabama

== C ==
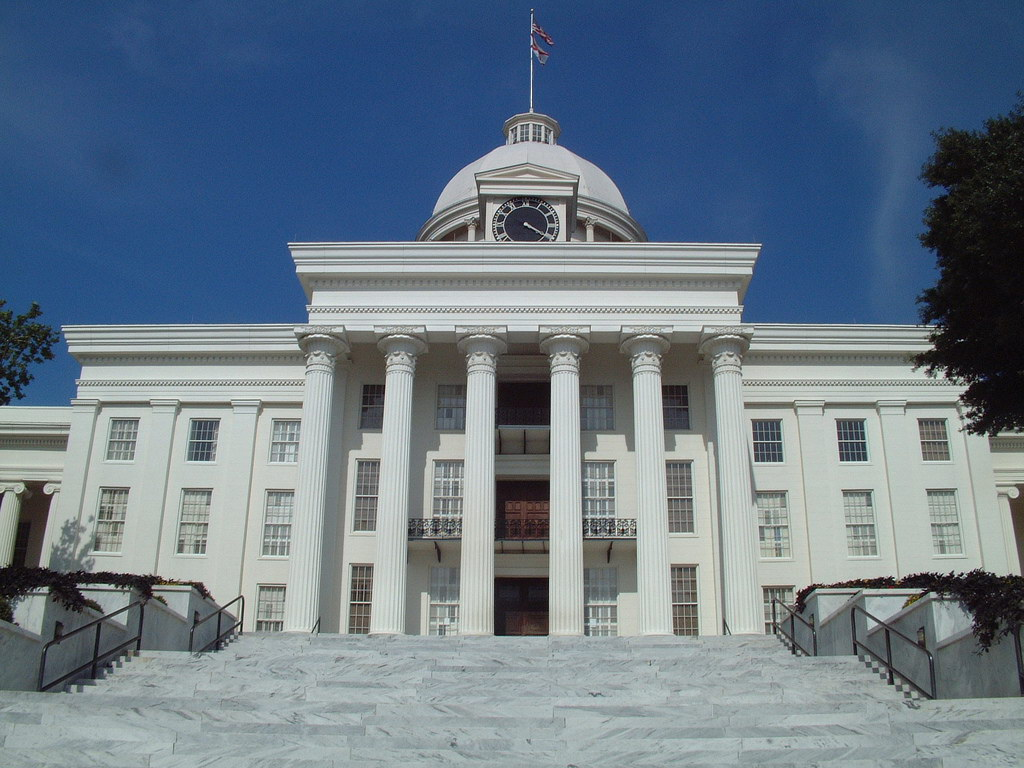
The Alabama State Capitol in Montgomery

- Cahawba, Alabama, state capital 1820-1826
- Cannabis in Alabama
- Capital of the State of Alabama
- Capital punishment in Alabama
- Capitol of the State of Alabama
  - commons:Category:Alabama State Capitol
- Caves of Alabama
  - commons:Category:Caves of Alabama
- Celebration Arena, Priceville
- Census statistical areas of Alabama
- Cities in Alabama
  - Nicknames of Alabama cities
  - Category:Cities in Alabama
    - commons:Category:Cities in Alabama
- City Stages Music Festival, Birmingham
- Climate of Alabama
- Climate change in Alabama
- Coat of arms of the state of Alabama
- Colleges and universities in Alabama
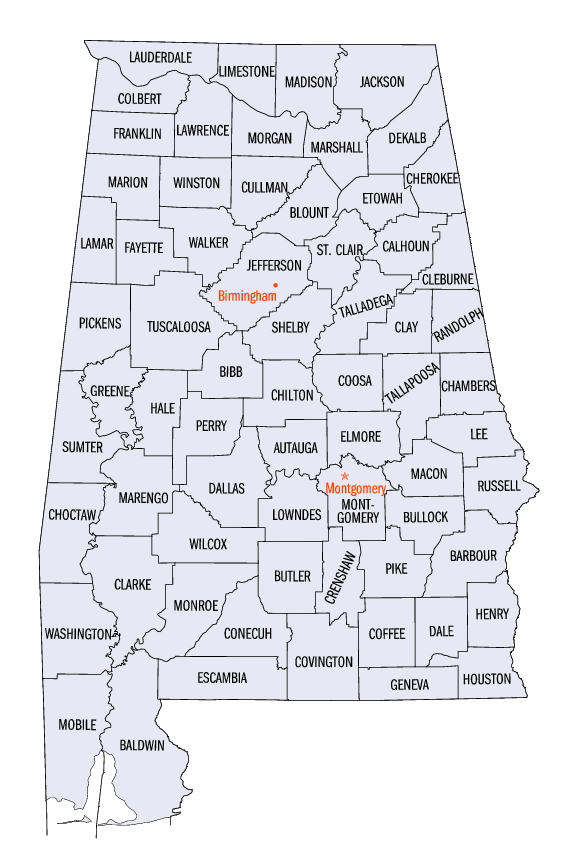
  An enlargeable map of the 67 counties of the state of Alabama
- Colony of Georgia, 1732–1776
  - commons:Category:Universities and colleges in Alabama
- Colony of West Florida, 1763–1783
- Communications in Alabama
  - commons:Category:Communications in Alabama
- Companies in Alabama
  - Category:Companies based in Alabama
- Congressional districts of Alabama
- Constitution of the State of Alabama
- Convention centers in Alabama
  - commons:Category:Convention centers in Alabama
- Counties of the state of Alabama
  - commons:Category:Counties in Alabama
- Crime in Alabama
- Culture of Alabama
  - commons:Category:Alabama culture

== D ==
- Demographics of Alabama
  - Category:Demographics of Alabama

== E ==
- Economy of Alabama
  - Category:Economy of Alabama
    - commons:Category:Economy of Alabama
- Education in Alabama
  - Category:Education in Alabama
    - commons:Category:Education in Alabama
- Elections of the state of Alabama
  - commons:Category:Elections in Alabama
- Environment of Alabama
  - commons:Category:Environment of Alabama

== F ==
The flag of the state of Alabama

- Fair Park Arena, Birmingham
- Festivals in Alabama
  - commons:Category:Festivals in Alabama
- Flag of the state of Alabama
- Florida Occidental, 1783–1821
- Forts in Alabama
  - Category:Forts in Alabama
    - commons:Category:Forts in Alabama

== G ==
The Great Seal of the State of Alabama

- Geography of Alabama
  - Category:Geography of Alabama
    - commons:Category:Geography of Alabama
- Geology of Alabama
  - Category:Geology of Alabama
    - commons:Category:Geology of Alabama
- Ghost towns in Alabama
  - Category:Ghost towns in Alabama
    - commons:Category:Ghost towns in Alabama
- GMAC Bowl
- Golf clubs and courses in Alabama
- Government of the state of Alabama website
  - Category:Government of Alabama
    - commons:Category:Government of Alabama
- Governors Drive
- Governor of the State of Alabama
  - List of governors of Alabama
- Great Seal of the State of Alabama
- Gulf Shores, Alabama
- Gun laws in Alabama

== H ==
- Hank Aaron Stadium, Mobile
- Hatton-Brown Publishers
- Heritage railroads in Alabama
  - commons:Category:Heritage railroads in Alabama
- High schools of Alabama
- Higher education in Alabama
- Highway Patrol of Alabama
- Highways in Alabama
- Hiking trails in Alabama
  - commons:Category:Hiking trails in Alabama
- Historical Panorama of Alabama Agriculture
- History of Alabama
  - Historical outline of Alabama
  - History of Baptists in Alabama
    - Category:History of Alabama
      - commons:Category:History of Alabama
- History of slavery in Alabama
- Hospitals in Alabama
- House of Representatives of the State of Alabama
- Huntsville, Alabama, first state capital 1819-1820

== I ==
- Images of Alabama
  - commons:Category:Alabama
- The International Motorsports Hall of Fame & Museum, Talladega
- Islands of Alabama

== J ==
- Joe W. Davis Stadium, Huntsville
- Jordan–Hare Stadium, Auburn
- Jubilee City Fest, Montgomery

== L ==
- La Florida, 1565–1763
- Ladd–Peebles Stadium, Mobile
- Lakes in Alabama
  - Category:Lakes of Alabama
    - commons:Category:Lakes of Alabama
- Landmarks in Alabama
  - commons:Category:Landmarks in Alabama
- Legion Field, Birmingham
- LGBT rights in Alabama
- Lieutenant Governor of the State of Alabama
- Lists related to the state of Alabama:
  - List of airports in Alabama
  - List of amphibians of Alabama
  - List of census statistical areas in Alabama
  - List of cities in Alabama
    - List of city nicknames in Alabama
  - List of colleges and universities in Alabama
  - List of companies in Alabama
  - List of counties in Alabama
  - List of forts in Alabama
  - List of ghost towns in Alabama
  - List of governors of Alabama
  - List of high schools in Alabama
  - List of highway routes in Alabama
  - List of hospitals in Alabama
  - List of individuals executed in Alabama
  - List of islands of Alabama
  - List of lakes of Alabama
  - List of law enforcement agencies in Alabama
  - List of lieutenant governors of Alabama
  - List of mammals of Alabama
  - List of museums in Alabama
  - List of National Historic Landmarks in Alabama
  - List of newspapers in Alabama
  - List of the oldest buildings in Alabama
  - List of people from Alabama
  - List of places in Alabama
  - List of radio stations in Alabama
  - List of railroads in Alabama
  - List of Registered Historic Places in Alabama
  - List of reptiles of Alabama
  - List of rivers in Alabama
  - List of school districts in Alabama
  - List of state forests in Alabama
  - List of state highways in Alabama
  - List of state parks in Alabama
  - List of state prisons in Alabama
  - List of state symbols of Alabama
  - List of telephone area codes in Alabama
  - List of television stations in Alabama
  - List of Alabama's congressional delegations
  - List of United States congressional districts in Alabama
  - List of United States representatives from Alabama
  - List of United States senators from Alabama

== M ==
- Maps of Alabama
  - commons:Category:Maps of Alabama
- Mardi Gras, Mobile
- Mass media in Alabama
- Ben E. May, Mobile philanthropist
- McWane Science Center, Birmingham
- Mitchell Center, Mobile
- Mobile, Alabama
- Mobile, Alabama in the American Civil War
- Mobile Bay Jubilee
- Mobile campaign (1865)
- Mobile Civic Center, Mobile
- Mobile District, 1810–1821
- Montgomery, Alabama, state capital since 1846, CSA capital 1861
- Montgomery bus boycott
- Montgomery Riverwalk Stadium, Montgomery
- Monuments and memorials in Alabama
  - commons:Category:Monuments and memorials in Alabama
- Mountains of Alabama
  - commons:Category:Mountains of Alabama
- Movie Gallery Veterans Stadium, Troy
- Museums in Alabama
  - Category:Museums in Alabama
    - commons:Category:Museums in Alabama
- Music of Alabama
  - Category:Music of Alabama
    - commons:Category:Music of Alabama
  - Category:Musical groups from Alabama
  - Category:Musicians from Alabama

== N ==
- National forests of Alabama
  - commons:Category:National Forests of Alabama
- National historic landmarks of Alabama
  - commons:Category:National Historic Landmarks in Alabama
- National Peanut Festival
- Natural history of Alabama
  - commons:Category:Natural history of Alabama
- Nature centers in Alabama
  - commons:Category:Nature centers in Alabama
- Newspapers of Alabama

== O ==
- Old Saint Stephens
- Old State Bank
- Outdoor sculptures in Alabama
  - commons:Category:Outdoor sculptures in Alabama

== P ==
- Papajohns.com Bowl (formerly the Birmingham Bowl)
- Paul Snow Stadium, Jacksonville
- People from Alabama
  - Category:People from Alabama
    - commons:Category:People from Alabama
    - Category:People from Alabama by populated place
    - Category:People from Alabama by county
    - Category:People from Alabama by occupation
- Places in Alabama
- Point Mallard Aquatic Center, Decatur
- Politics of Alabama
  - Category:Politics of Alabama
    - commons:Category:Politics of Alabama
- Portal:Alabama
- Protected areas of Alabama
  - commons:Category:Protected areas of Alabama
- Province of Georgia

== Q ==
- Quad site

== R ==
- Radio stations in Alabama
- Railroad museums in Alabama
  - commons:Category:Railroad museums in Alabama
- Railroads in Alabama
- Regions Charity Classic (formerly the Bruno's Memorial Classic)
- Regions Park, Hoover
- Registered historic places in Alabama
  - commons:Category:Registered Historic Places in Alabama
- Religion in Alabama
  - Category:Religion in Alabama
    - commons:Category:Religion in Alabama
- Republic of West Florida, 1810
- Rhea-McEntire House
- Rickwood Field, Birmingham
- Rivers of Alabama
  - commons:Category:Rivers of Alabama
- Robert Trent Jones Golf Trail

== S ==
- Stand in the Schoolhouse Door
- St. Stephens, Alabama, territorial capital 1817-1819
- School districts of Alabama
- Scouting in Alabama
- Selma, Alabama
- Selma, Alabama in the American Civil War
- Selma to Montgomery marches
- Senate of the State of Alabama
- Senior Bowl
- Settlements in Alabama
  - Cities in Alabama
  - Towns in Alabama
  - Census Designated Places in Alabama
  - Other unincorporated communities in Alabama
  - List of ghost towns in Alabama
  - List of places in Alabama
- Sidewalk Moving Picture Festival
- Skirmish at Paint Rock Bridge
- Spirit of America Festival
- Sports in Alabama
  - commons:Category:Sports in Alabama
- Sports venues in Alabama
  - commons:Category:Sports venues in Alabama
- State Capitol of Alabama
- State of Alabama website
  - Constitution of the State of Alabama
  - Government of the state of Alabama
    - Category:Government of Alabama
      - commons:Category:Government of Alabama
  - Executive branch of the government of the state of Alabama
    - Governor of the State of Alabama
  - Legislative branch of the government of the state of Alabama
    - Legislature of the State of Alabama
      - Senate of the State of Alabama
      - House of Representatives of the State of Alabama
  - Judicial branch of the government of the state of Alabama
    - Supreme Court of the State of Alabama
- State of Georgia, western claims 1776-1802
- State parks of Alabama
  - commons:Category:State parks of Alabama
- State police of Alabama
- State prisons of Alabama
- Structures in Alabama
  - commons:Category:Buildings and structures in Alabama
- Superfund sites in Alabama
- Supreme Court of the State of Alabama
- Symbols of the state of Alabama
  - Category:Symbols of Alabama
    - commons:Category:Symbols of Alabama

== T ==
- Talladega Superspeedway
- Telecommunications in Alabama
  - commons:Category:Communications in Alabama
- Telephone area codes in Alabama
- Television stations in Alabama
- Tennessee River
- Tennessee Valley Authority
- Territory of Alabama, 1817–1819
- Territory of Mississippi, 1798–1817
- Theatres in Alabama
  - commons:Category:Theatres in Alabama
- Tourism in Alabama website
  - commons:Category:Tourism in Alabama
- Trail of Tears, 1830–1838
- Treaty of Madrid of 1795
- Transportation in Alabama
  - Category:Transportation in Alabama
    - commons:Category:Transport in Alabama
- Tuscaloosa, Alabama, state capital 1826-1846

== U ==
- United States of America
  - States of the United States of America
  - United States census statistical areas of Alabama
  - Alabama's congressional delegations
  - United States congressional districts in Alabama
  - United States Court of Appeals for the Eleventh Circuit
  - United States District Court for the Middle District of Alabama
  - United States District Court for the Northern District of Alabama
  - United States District Court for the Southern District of Alabama
  - United States representatives from Alabama
  - United States senators from Alabama
- Universities and colleges in Alabama
  - commons:Category:Universities and colleges in Alabama
- U.S. Space and Rocket Center, Huntsville
- U.S. Space Camp, Huntsville
- US-AL – ISO 3166-2:US region code for the State of Alabama
- USS Alabama

== V ==
- Von Braun Center, Huntsville
- Vulcan statue, Birmingham

== W ==
- Water parks in Alabama
- Waterfalls of Alabama
  - commons:Category:Waterfalls of Alabama
  Wikimedia
  - Wikimedia Commons:Category:Alabama
    - commons:Category:Maps of Alabama
  - Wikinews:Category:Alabama
    - Wikinews:Portal:Alabama
  - Wikipedia Category:Alabama
    - Wikipedia Portal:Alabama
    - Wikipedia:WikiProject Alabama
      - Category:WikiProject Alabama articles
      - Category:WikiProject Alabama participants

== Y ==
- Yellowhammer

== Z ==
- Zoos in Alabama

== See also ==
- Topic overview:
  - Alabama
  - Outline of Alabama
