= Climate of Alabama =

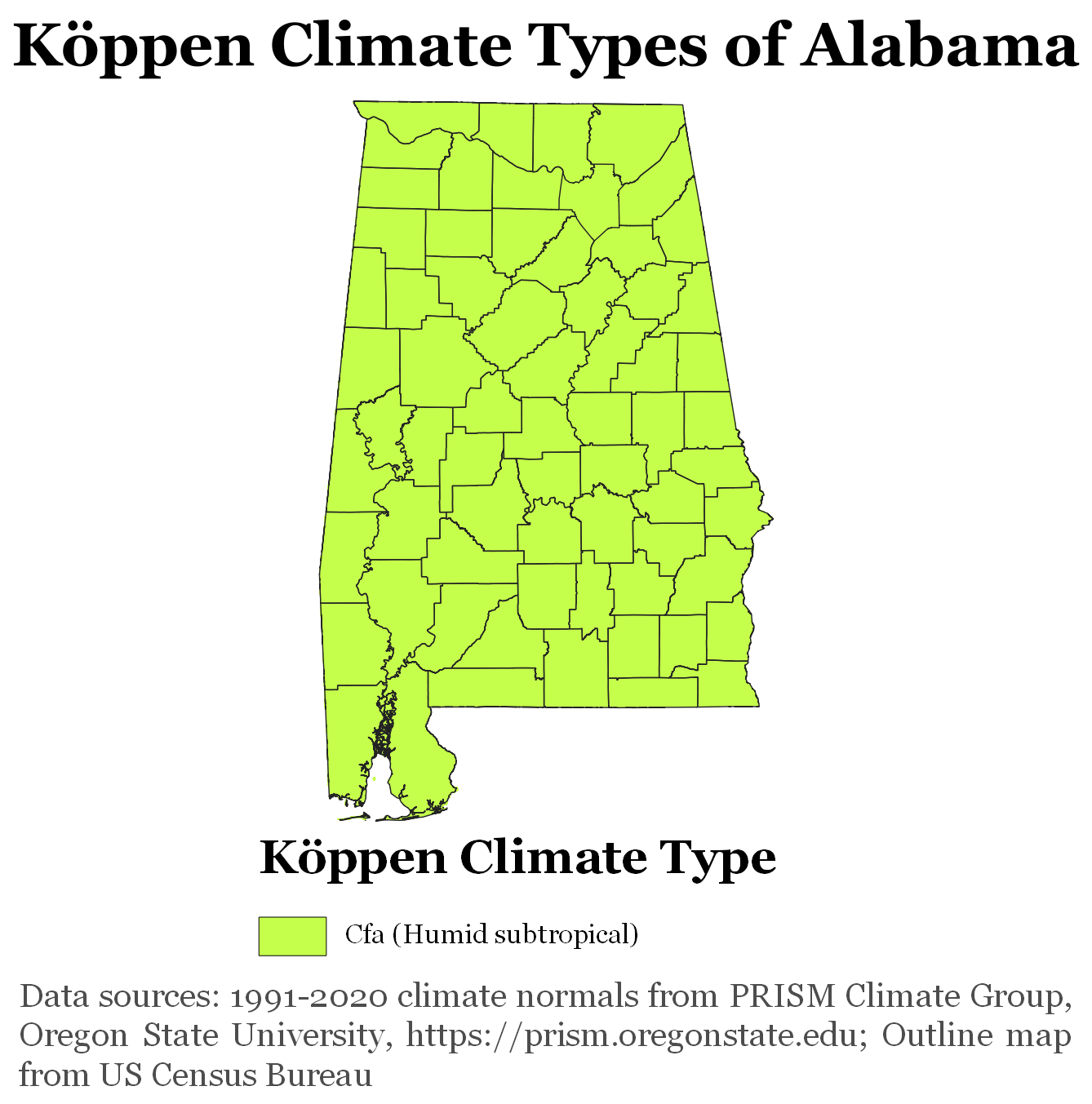
Köppen climate types of Alabama, using 1991–2020 climate normals.

The state of Alabama is classified as humid subtropical (Cfa) under the Köppen climate classification. The state's average annual temperature is 64 °F (18 °C). Temperatures tend to be warmer in the state's southern portion with its proximity to the Gulf of Mexico, while its northern portions, especially in the Appalachian Mountains in the northeast, tend to be slightly cooler. Alabama generally has hot, humid summers and mild winters with copious precipitation throughout the year. The state receives an average of 56 inches (1,400 mm) of rainfall each year and experiences a lengthy growing season of up to 300 days in its southern portion. Hailstorms occur occasionally during the spring and summer here, but they are seldom destructive. Heavy fogs are rare, and they are confined chiefly to the coast. Thunderstorms also occur year-around. They are most common in the summer, but they are most commonly severe during the spring (i.e. March through May) and late autumn (i.e. November). That is when destructive winds and tornadoes occur frequently, especially in the northern and central parts of the state. Central and northern Alabama are squarely within Dixie Alley, the primary area in the U.S. outside the Southern Plains (i.e. the traditional Tornado Alley) with relatively high tornado risk. Alabama is ranked second in the U.S for the deadliest tornadoes. Hurricanes are quite common in the state, especially in the southern part. Major hurricanes occasionally strike the coast, such as Hurricane Frederic in September 1979 and Hurricane Ivan in September 2004; both storms resulted in significant to devastating damage in the Mobile area.

== Temperature ==
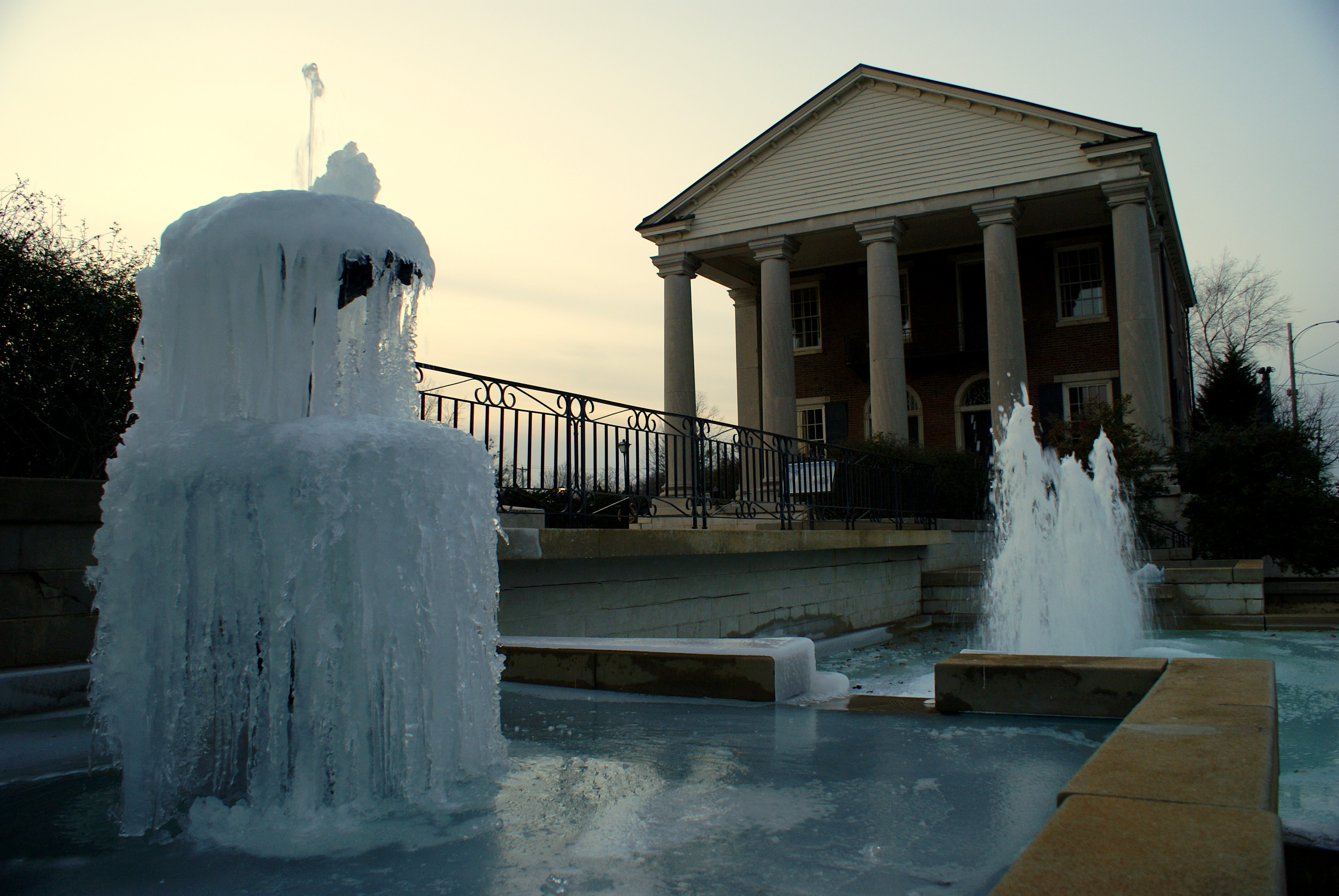
Though winters in the state are usually mild, nightly freezing occurs frequently in the North Alabama region. This is shown in this picture taken at the Old State Bank in Decatur during early January.

Summers in Alabama are among the hottest in the United States, with high temperatures averaging over 90 °F (32 °C) throughout the summer in many parts of the state. In the extreme south, summer's heat is tempered slightly by winds from the Gulf of Mexico which often blow inland by up to 10–15 miles (16–24 km). In parts of northern Alabama, the elevation above sea level similarly tempers the summer heat. The average nighttime humidity is highest in southwest Alabama, which results in the highest daily average temperatures for weather stations in the state. While afternoon highs in Mobile are slightly cooler than those in Alabama's inland cities, the warm nights produced by proximity to the Gulf of Mexico results in the average annual temperature for Mobile being the highest in the state. Cool morning temperatures help keep the northeast highlands among the more temperate locations in the state and lowest in the northeast among the highlands. At Mobile, the annual mean temperature is 67.6 °F (19.8 °C), the summer mean temperature is 81.3 °F (27.4 °C), and the winter mean temperature is 53.1 °F (11.7 °C); at Valley Head, in DeKalb County, the annual mean temperature is 58.7 °F (14.8 °C), the summer mean temperature is 75.5 °F (24.2 °C), and the winter mean temperature is 41.4 °F (5.2 °C). At Montgomery, in the central region, the average annual temperature is 66.4 °F (19.1 °C), with a winter average of 50.3 °F (10.2 °C), and a summer average of 81.9 °F (27.7 °C). The average winter minimum for the entire state is 35 °F (2 °C), and there is an average of 35 days in each year in which the thermometer falls below the freezing-point. At extremely rare intervals the thermometer has fallen below 0 °F (−18 °C), as was the case in the extreme cold wave of 12–13 February 1899, when an absolute minimum of −17 °F (−27 °C) was registered at Valley Head. The highest temperature ever recorded was 112 °F (44 °C) in Centreville on September 6, 1925. During the exceptional August 2007 heat wave, three instances of official 108 °F (42 °C) heat were recorded at Maxwell Air Force Base in Montgomery, each tying the all-time record for the capital city. Winters are generally mild in Alabama, as they are throughout most of the southeastern United States, with average January low temperatures around 40.7 °F (4.8 °C) in Mobile, 33.1 °F (0.6 °C) in Huntsville, 36.5 °F (2.5 °C) in Montgomery, and 34.9 °F (1.6 °C) in Birmingham.

Monthly normal high and low temperatures for various Alabama cities [°F (°C)]
Month		Jan	Feb	Mar	Apr	May	Jun	Jul	Aug	Sep	Oct	Nov	Dec	Year	Cities in Alabama
Huntsville	Average high	52.3 (11.3)	57.1 (13.9)	65.5 (18.6)	74.8 (23.8)	82.5 (28.1)	89.1 (31.7)	91.5 (33.1)	91.3 (32.9)	86.5 (30.3)	76.0 (24.4)	63.9 (17.7)	55.0 (12.8)	73.8 (23.2)	Cities in Alabama
Huntsville	Average low	33.1 (0.6)	36.4 (2.4)	43.0 (6.1)	51.0 (10.6)	60.2 (15.7)	68.0 (20.0)	71.1 (21.7)	69.7 (20.9)	63.4 (17.4)	51.8 (11.0)	41.2 (5.1)	35.9 (2.2)	52.1 (11.2)	Cities in Alabama
Birmingham	Average high	54.5 (12.5)	59.1 (15.1)	67.1 (19.5)	75.0 (23.9)	82.0 (27.8)	88.1 (31.2)	91.0 (32.8)	90.6 (32.6)	85.9 (29.9)	76.0 (24.4)	65.0 (18.3)	56.9 (13.8)	74.3 (23.5)	Cities in Alabama
Birmingham	Average low	34.9 (1.6)	38.4 (3.6)	45.0 (7.2)	52.1 (11.2)	61.0 (16.1)	68.5 (20.3)	72.1 (22.3)	71.3 (21.8)	65.3 (18.5)	53.9 (12.2)	43.0 (6.1)	37.9 (3.3)	53.6 (12.0)	Cities in Alabama
Montgomery	Average high	59.8 (15.4)	64.7 (18.2)	71.9 (22.2)	78.8 (26.0)	86.0 (30.0)	91.5 (33.1)	93.7 (34.3)	93.6 (34.2)	89.3 (31.8)	80.2 (26.8)	69.8 (21.0)	61.9 (16.6)	78.4 (25.8)	Cities in Alabama
Montgomery	Average low	36.5 (2.5)	40.4 (4.7)	46.5 (8.1)	52.6 (11.4)	61.3 (16.3)	69.0 (20.6)	72.1 (22.3)	71.4 (21.9)	66.3 (19.1)	54.5 (12.5)	43.3 (6.3)	38.6 (3.7)	54.4 (12.4)	Cities in Alabama
Mobile	Average high	61.5 (16.4)	65.6 (18.7)	71.8 (22.1)	77.8 (25.4)	84.9 (29.4)	89.4 (31.9)	90.9 (32.7)	90.8 (32.7)	87.5 (30.8)	79.7 (26.5)	70.2 (21.2)	63.5 (17.5)	77.8 (25.4)	Cities in Alabama
Mobile	Average low	40.7 (4.8)	44.4 (6.9)	50.0 (10.0)	56.0 (13.3)	63.8 (17.7)	70.8 (21.6)	73.1 (22.8)	72.9 (22.7)	68.8 (20.4)	58.2 (14.6)	47.7 (8.7)	43.0 (6.1)	57.4 (14.1)	Cities in Alabama

== Extremes ==
Climate data for Alabama
Month	Jan	Feb	Mar	Apr	May	Jun	Jul	Aug	Sep	Oct	Nov	Dec	Year
Record high °F (°C)	88 (31)	89 (32)	94 (34)	98 (37)	105 (41)	109 (43)	111 (44)	109 (43)	112 (44)	103 (39)	92 (33)	88 (31)	112 (44)
Record low °F (°C)	−27 (−33)	−18 (−28)	2 (−17)	19 (−7)	29 (−2)	35 (2)	41 (5)	39 (4)	29 (−2)	19 (−7)	−2 (−19)	−10 (−23)	−27 (−33)
Source: ?

== Precipitation ==
The amount of precipitation is greatest along the coast (62 inches/1,574 mm) and evenly distributed through the rest of the state (about 52 inches/1,320 mm). Much of the rainfall is produced by thunderstorms and, occasionally, by hurricanes and other tropical disturbances. In central and northern Alabama, average monthly precipitation amounts are highest from November to April, typically peaking in December or March, as at Huntsville (December maximum) or Birmingham (March maximum), with August to October the driest months. Along the coast, summer thunderstorm rains are markedly more frequent and tropical weather systems are a threat from July to October. Accordingly, at Mobile, virtually the wettest city annually anywhere in the eastern United States (wetter than even Miami, FL with its drier winters), monthly average precipitation peaks in July and August, but virtually the entire year is wet, with October a slightly drier month.

Although snow is a rare event in much of Alabama, areas of the state north of Montgomery may receive a dusting of snow a few times every winter, with an occasional moderately heavy snowfall every few years. Historic heavy snowfall events include the New Year's Eve 1963 snowstorm and the 1993 Storm of the Century. The annual average snowfall for the Birmingham area is 2 inches (51 mm) per year. In the southern Gulf coast, snowfall is less frequent, sometimes going several years without any snowfall.

== El Niño and La Niña ==
During El Niño, Alabama receives colder than average winter temperatures with wetter than average conditions along the southern parts of the state and drier than average conditions in the northern parts. La Niña brings warmer than average temperatures with the drier weather in the southern parts of the state due to a northern storm track.

== Hazards ==
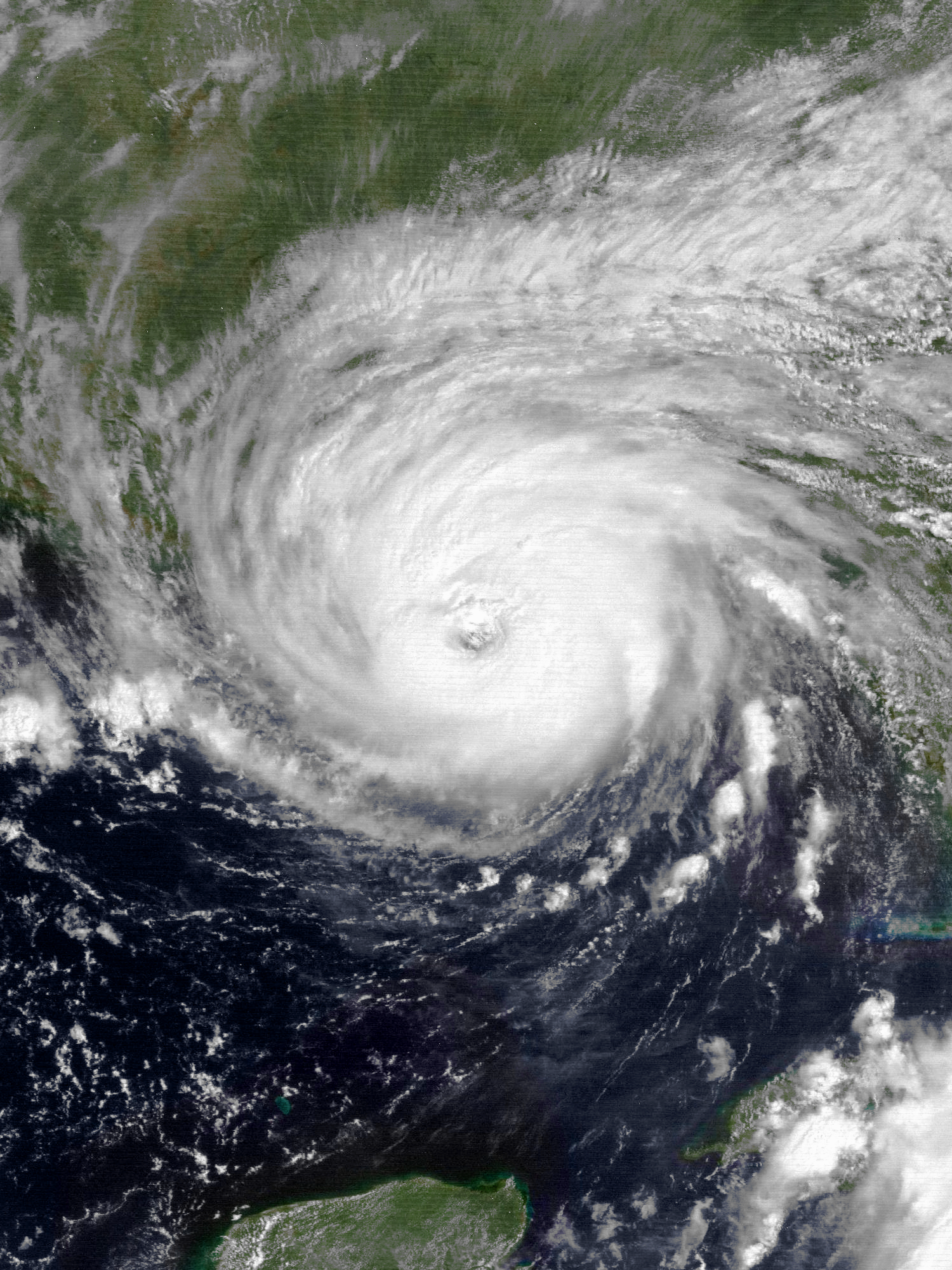
Hurricane Frederic, a major hurricane which struck Alabama in September 1979

Alabama is also prone to tropical storms and even hurricanes. Areas of the state far away from the Gulf are not immune to the effects of the storms, which often dump tremendous amounts of rain as they move inland and weaken. Thunderstorms are common during the summer throughout Alabama and also occur during other times of the year including winter. South Alabama reports many thunderstorms. The Gulf Coast, around Mobile Bay, averages between 100 and 110 days per year with thunder reported, which eastern and northwest Alabama have 70 to 80 thunderstorm days per year. Occasionally, thunderstorms are severe with frequent lightning and large hail – the central and northern parts of the state are most vulnerable to this type of storm, the northern and central regions of Alabama are especially prone to tornadoes. Alabama ranks seventh in the number of deaths from lightning and ninth in the number of deaths from lightning strikes per capita.

Tornadoes occur frequently in Alabama during the spring and fall months, these tornadoes can be devastating and even deadly.– these are common throughout the state, although the peak season for tornadoes varies from the northern to southern parts of the state. Alabama, along with Kansas, has more reported F5/EF5 tornadoes than any other state – according to statistics from the National Climatic Data Center for the period January 1, 1950, to October 31, 2006. An F5 tornado is the most powerful of its kind. Several long – tracked F5 tornadoes have contributed to Alabama reporting more tornado fatalities than any other state except for Texas and Mississippi. The Super Outbreaks of April 1974 and April 2011 both badly affected Alabama. The northern part of the state – along the Tennessee Valley – is one of the areas in the US most vulnerable to violent tornadoes . The area of Alabama and Mississippi most affected by tornadoes is sometimes referred to as Dixie Alley, as distinct from the Tornado Alley of the Southern Plains. Alabama is one of the few places in the world that has a secondary tornado season (November and December) along with the spring severe weather season.

== See also ==
- Climate change in Alabama
