= Alabama Department of Environmental Management =

Government agency in Alabama, United States

- Logo of the Alabama Department of Environmental Management

Agency overview
- Formed: 1982
- Jurisdiction: State of Alabama
- Headquarters: 1400 Coliseum Boulevard Montgomery, Alabama; 32°24′42″N 86°15′54″W
- Agency executives: Edward F. Poolos, Director; Jeffery W. Kitchens, Deputy Director
- Website: www.adem.alabama.gov

The Alabama Department of Environmental Management (ADEM) is a state government agency charged with the enforcement of environmental policy in the U.S. state of Alabama. It is authorized to adopt and enforce rules and regulations consistent with the statutory authority granted to the Alabama Environmental Management Commission and ADEM by the United States Environmental Protection Agency (EPA). It was created in 1982 with the passage of the Alabama Environmental Management Act by the Alabama Legislature. The act consolidated the various commissions, agencies, and programs that had been responsible for implementing environmental law into the Alabama Environmental Management Commission and ADEM. In past years, the agency has been repeatedly accused of not enforcing environmental regulations.

== Organization ==
The Alabama Environmental Management Commission (AEMC), whose members are appointed to six-year terms by the Governor of Alabama with advice and consent by the Alabama Senate, provides oversight of ADEM. This seven-member panel develops state environmental policy; hears administrative appeals of permits, administrative orders, and variances issued by ADEM; adopts environmental regulations; and selects the ADEM director. The commission must include a physician licensed to practice medicine in the state, a professional engineer registered in the state, an attorney licensed to practice law in the state, a chemist or veterinarian, an individual certified by the National Water Well Association certification program, a biologist or an ecologist, and one member-at-large who has been a resident of the state for at least two years.

ADEM administers federal environmental laws, including the Clean Air, Clean Water and Safe Drinking Water acts and federal solid and hazardous waste laws. The agency assumed these responsibilities after state laws and regulations were demonstrated to be at least equivalent to the federal standards and that the state had the funds and personnel available to administer them. The agency has eight internal divisions: Air Division, Land Division, Water Division, Field Operations Division, the Office of Environmental Quality, Permits and Services Division, Office of General Counsel, and Human Resources. All are overseen by the Office of the Director. The Office of the Director is headed by the commission-appointed director and includes a deputy director, environmental counsel, and an environmental justice ombudsman.

== Criticism ==
Since the 1990s the agency and commission have been criticized by numerous Alabama-based environmental protection groups for not enforcing regulations, and one consequence of this criticism was the establishment of the ADEM Reform Coalition in 2002. It comprises 38 organizations and has an agenda of improving the agency’s enforcement of existing environment laws. In the past, the coalition has accused the Alabama Environmental Management Commission of not doing its job of holding the director and agency accountable. In 2003, coalition member groups gained the right for the public to speak at commission meetings. Following this, the commission supported the establishment of stronger enforcement policies. The former director, Jim Warr, retired from the agency. A new director, Trey Glenn, was brought on board in January 2005, although his hiring, in itself, would later prove controversial and prompt a grand jury inquiry into accusations of ethics violations by him. In 2006 an environmental justice ombudsman was appointed to oversee ADEM's efforts to ensure that burdens of pollution are not borne disproportionately by communities with low income or "people of color."

During his tenure with the agency, Glenn took some controversial positions. Accusations of non-enforcement continued to be leveled against the agency, most notably by the Southern Environmental Law Center, which filed a lawsuit on December 22, 2008. The lawsuit challenged ADEM's issuance of a permit for a proposed strip coal mine that would discharge waste water into the Mulberry Fork of the Black Warrior River, 800 feet (240 m) upstream from a major drinking water intake for Birmingham. Glenn, a former engineer with Alabama Power, was also noted during his time at the agency for his effort to enable Alabama companies to emit more air pollution than their permits allow. Following lawsuits and legal wrangling, the EPA refused to authorize that rule change. A review by the ADEM Reform Coalition found that pollution penalties assessed to emitters by ADEM declined by roughly 78 percent in 2009, compared to 2007 and 2008. Glenn resigned his position on December 11, 2009. The commission appointed John Hagood, an ADEM attorney, as the interim director. On January 15, 2010, the environmental group coalition petitioned the EPA to take away Alabama's regulatory authority, charging that ADEM failed to enforce key sections of the federal Clean Water Act.

== Awards ==
2009 Innovative Alabama Governments Awards Honorable Mention

2012 Green Apple Award Winner

== See also ==
- Climate change in Alabama
- Government of Alabama
