= Historical Panorama of Alabama Agriculture =

Series of murals commissioned in Alabama in 1939

The Historical Panorama of Alabama Agriculture is a series of murals commissioned by the Alabama Extension Service (now the Alabama Cooperative Extension System) and partly funded by the Works Progress Administration (WPA) for the Alabama State Fair in 1939, held October 2–7 in Birmingham, Alabama.

The project was assigned to John Augustus Walker, an artist from Mobile, Alabama, who had previously completed several WPA-related art commissions. Walker was originally commissioned to paint 29 murals for the exhibition, each intended to depict scenes from Alabama’s agricultural history. However, due to time constraints, he was only able to complete ten murals.

These murals illustrated key periods of Alabama’s agricultural development, beginning with Native American farming practices and progressing through later developments. The series was part of a broader WPA initiative designed to support artists during the Great Depression, while also encouraging public interest in the arts.

At the time of the commission, Walker was 37 years old. The project is one of several funded by the WPA to sustain artists and stimulate appreciation for American culture during and after the economic crisis. The completed murals are considered by art historians to be notable examples of WPA-sponsored public art from the Great Depression era.

== Background ==
Then-Alabama Extension Director P. O. Davis noted that "agriculture in Alabama, and in this nation, is in a period of change — a change toward improvement and progress."

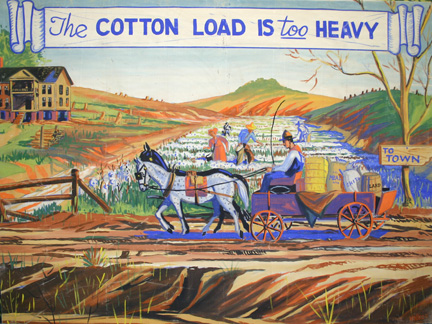
Originally intended to depict an impoverished "one-armed Confederate" veteran working in a soil-eroded field, All of the elements in the painting were intended to represent the antithesis of everything farming was supposed to be in the 20th century, such as a dilapidated plantation house, highly eroded cropland soil, a farming operation exclusively dependent on cotton, and a wagon loaded with supplies that should have been produced on the farm.

Alabama, Davis stressed, was diversifying, moving from a primarily cotton-based economy "into a combination of cotton and other cash crops plus livestock and poultry." He envisioned murals and the supporting fair exhibits not only as a celebration of the past, but also as a means of focusing farmers on a "vision of the future." He also wrote that "it will reveal also that Alabama agriculture is not only changing and improving but that it is geared to go forward in a big way and in terms of efficiency and economy". Davis viewed the murals as yet another form of educational communication that had distinguished previous Extension efforts — a means for "guiding farmers as to what to do and how to do it."

State fairs were considered a prime venue for this type of educational outreach in the Depression-era Thirties. Agricultural exhibits were a mainstay of these state fairs. According to Bruce Dupree, an Alabama Cooperative Extension System art specialist and Walker expert,

Fairgoers moved excitedly through poorly lit, unair-conditioned buildings to view prize-winning livestock, colorful quilts, farm exhibits, baking contests, and canning demonstrations. In Alabama, each of the state's 67 counties was given space to showcase local produce and a specific agricultural industry.

Managing the large number of entries often proved to be a daunting task for fair planners, leading many of them to consider different strategies for handling these agricultural exhibits. The Historical Panorama of Alabama Agriculture was conceived as one such strategy by Vice President Warren Leech, who wanted to develop a radically different and more effective way to showcase Alabama agriculture by combining separate county exhibits into one agricultural show. Leech paid a visit to Davis in Auburn to discuss his ideas. Davis quickly grasped this opportunity, seeing it as a way to highlight the role served by the Alabama Extension Service and the Alabama Polytechnic Institute (now Auburn University) in advancing the state's food and fiber sector.

== Production ==
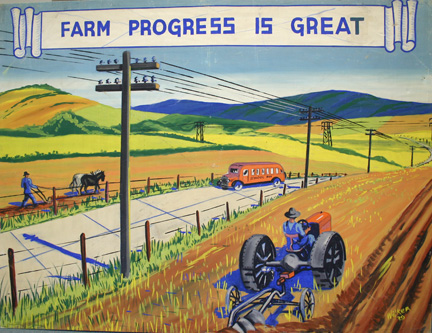
All the elements of this painting were included to reflect Cooperative Extension's vision for 20th century farming – mechanized farming, crop diversification and rural electrification.

In an "Informal Report on Alabama Pageant of Agriculture Exhibit" submitted to Davis in May 1939, the project was described as being "in good hands" and was predicted to be "unusually successful." Extension employees dispatched to Mobile to consult with Walker reported to Davis that they were confident that panorama would "present Alabama agriculture in a most interesting way" and that "the entire series, especially if they are properly interpreted, should make a very strong impression on those who see it."

Alabama Extension project planners also were impressed with the price associated with the commission. The sponsors reasoned that with the WPA underwriting, they were getting a series of murals with a market value of $6,000 for "approximately the cost of materials involved."

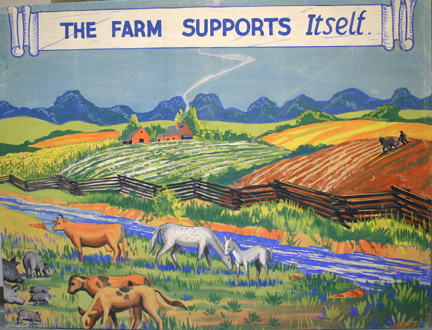
Another mural extolling the virtues of farm diversification, depicting livestock and row crops raised side by side

The planners were unwilling to defer solely to Walker's talents and exercised creative oversight throughout the course of the project. Davis and other Alabama Extension employees involved with the project expressed concerns about historical accuracy. For example, in a letter dated April 18, 1939, Alabama Extension Agricultural Editor Donald Robertson instructed Walker to replace the male depicted in a proposed sketch about Native American agricultural life with a female, because "according to Indian Legend, the women did most of the field work while the men did the hunting and 'took life easy.'" Robertson also suggested another picture that would depict "the arrival of women folks on the farm and perhaps one or two children to show the beginning of a well-rounded farm family."

Walker's Extension Service sponsors and U.S. Department of Agriculture employees became intimately involved in the planning, offering detailed instructions even for the selection and placement of the objects for display in the foreground of the murals. For example, each mural was to have a drapery border and a table in front of it filled with produce, farm implements, or household items that would complete the artwork.

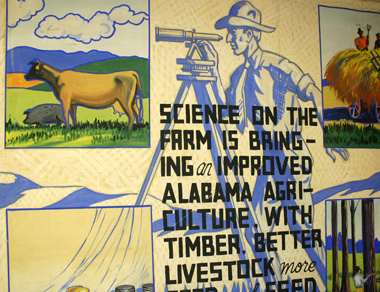
Another depiction of how Alabama was changing as a result of the application of sound agricultural and domestic practices promoted by Cooperative Extension and the land-grant university

H.T Baldwin wrote instructions that "the objects should be 100 percent pertinent to the stage of development represented by the mural". Baldwin was an employee with the Extension Exhibits Division of the USDA, one of several communications professionals who traveled throughout the country providing advice to state Extension services and providing quality control for Cooperative Extension-related visuals projects.

Baldwin also advised placing more objects in the foreground to relieve Walker of detailed painting. Due to lighting constraints, he also recommended that Walker use dull-finish colors rather than oils, which would create a shiny surface.

Moreover, he suggested that Walker include descriptive signage to help visitors "absorb" the information of all episodes. Baldwin also recommended that the interior elements of the hall be painted in API's school colors.

The effort placed immense physical and mental strain on Walker, who, in addition to managing the demands of a day job, also was contending with a serious family illness at the time. With only three weeks remaining before the fair's opening, the project was scaled down to 10 murals. The artist was also given full authority to purchase any materials needed to complete the exhibit and to fill the space made vacant by the 10 unfinished paintings. He ordered 40 new spotlights, more than 600 yards of fabric, hundreds of feet of rope, and all the crepe paper he could find to cover the exhibit hall ceiling.

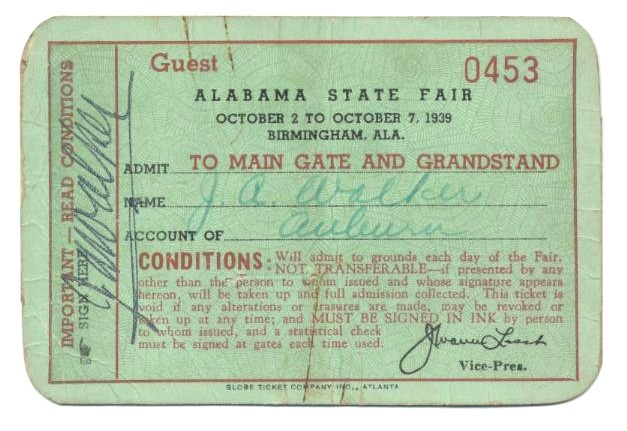
John A. Walker's pass to the 1939 Alabama State Fair

The murals ended up being approximately 7.5 feet by 5.5 feet with dry color on unbleached canvas. Because the murals were intended to last only for the duration of the fair, Walker painted them with tempera, a water-based and less durable medium, rather than his preferred medium of oils.

== Showing at the fair ==
The fair and the panorama turned out to be well-attended, highly successful undertakings. Record crowds filled the midway, grandstand, and exhibit halls throughout the day and night. Then-Governor Frank Dixon praised the fair and the planning that preceded it, describing the fair as "the best ever and a model for the entire nation to see." The fair also garnered front-page news coverage for five consecutive days. Moreover, the agriculture and industry exhibits appeared to generate more public interest than the rides and games.

== Aftermath ==
Immediately following the Alabama State Fair, the murals were packed and shipped to Shreveport, Louisiana, for display at the Louisiana State Fair, held October 21–30, 1939. Sometime thereafter, the murals were taken to Auburn University and stored in Duncan Hall, the state headquarters of the Alabama Extension Service, where they remained basically undisturbed for the next 45 years until they were rediscovered in the early 1980s. They were subsequently refurbished and displayed in Foy Student Union on the Auburn University campus.

Following their rediscovery, at least one Walker admirer advocated purchasing the murals from Auburn University and returning them to the artist's native Mobile. However, they remained in Auburn. As part of Auburn University's sesquicentennial celebration in 2006, the Alabama Cooperative Extension System, through Dupree's efforts, reintroduced the paintings after more than 20 years with a public lecture and display in the Foy Union Student Union Gallery. The son and grandchildren of the late artist were on hand for the lecture and exhibition to greet attendees and to answer questions.

== Notes ==
- Dupree, Bruce (Summer 2008) "John Augustus Walker and the Historical Panorama of Alabama Agriculture." Alabama Heritage. No. 89
