= Climate change in Alabama =

Climate change in the US state of Alabama

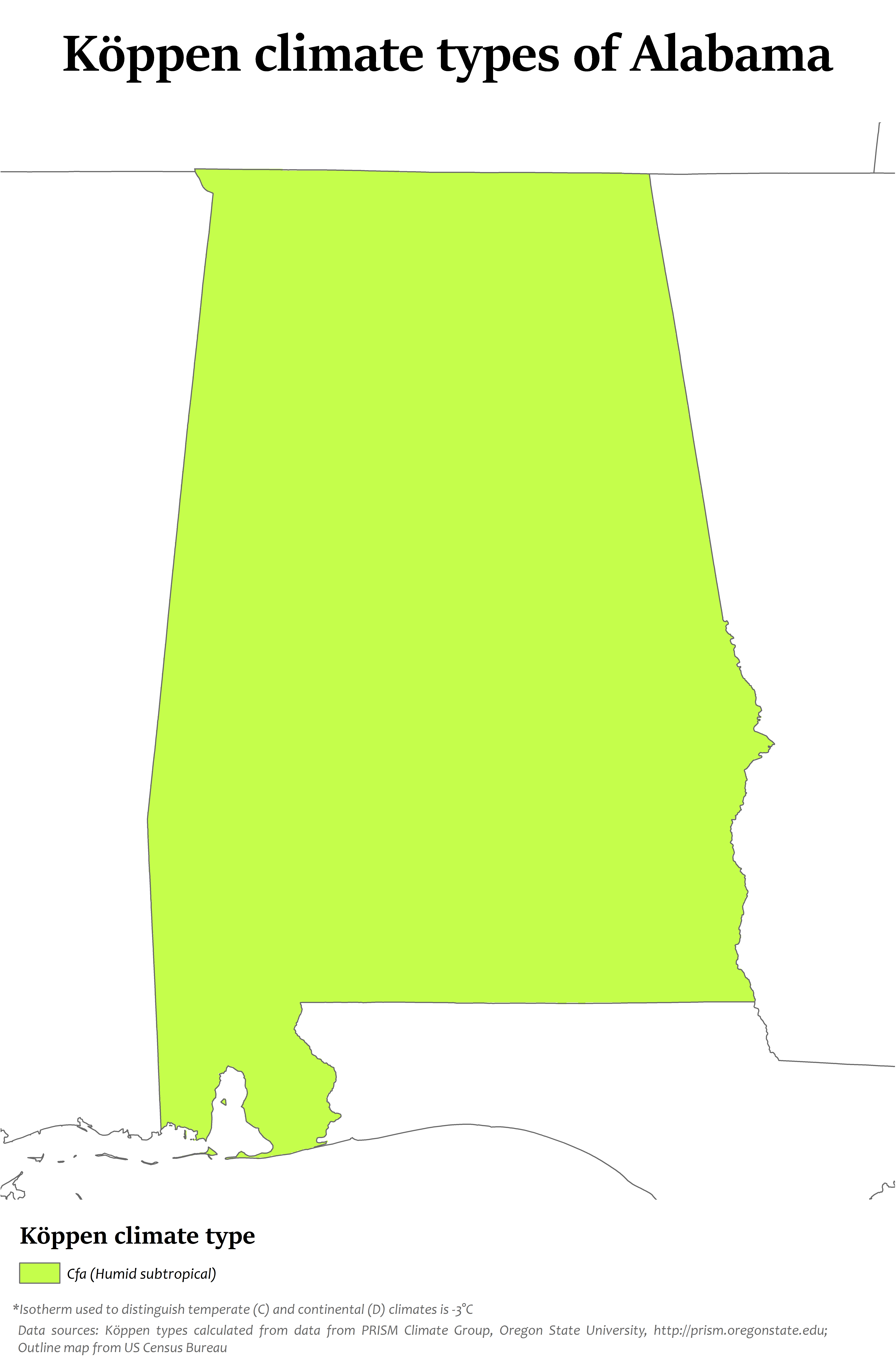
Köppen climate types in Alabama show the entire state to be humid subtropical.

Climate change in Alabama encompasses the effects of climate change, attributed to man-made increases in atmospheric carbon dioxide, in the U.S. state of Alabama.

== Projected effects of climate change ==
In 2016, the United States Environmental Protection Agency released an assessment of the effect of climate change on Alabama, assessing various likely outcomes, noting that "[c]hanging the climate is likely to increase damages from tropical storms, reduce crop yields, harm livestock, increase the number of unpleasantly hot days, and increase the risk of heat stroke and other heat-related illnesses". Other studies show that Alabama is among a string of "Deep South" states that will experience the worst effects of climate change.

=== Temperature ===
"In the coming decades, Alabama will become warmer, and the state will probably experience more severe floods and drought. Unlike most of the nation, Alabama has not become warmer during the last 50 years. But soils have become drier, annual rainfall has increased in most of the state, more rain arrives in heavy downpours, and sea level is rising about one inch every eight years".

"Sea level is rising more rapidly in Alabama than most coastal areas because the land is sinking. If the oceans and atmosphere continue to warm, sea level along the Alabama coast is likely to rise eighteen inches to four feet in the next century. Rising sea level submerges wetlands and dry land, erodes beaches, and exacerbates coastal flooding".

=== Precipitation ===
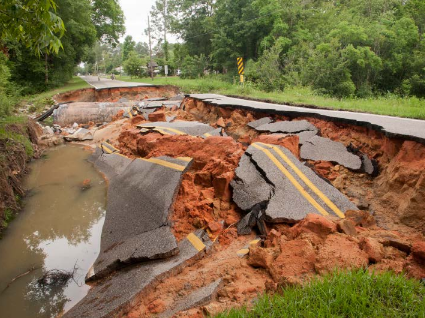
Flooding of a small stream in June 2014 destroyed this roadbed in Foley, Alabama.

The EPA projects increased more extreme precipitation in the future. These extremes include much higher rainfall during spring, leading to more flooding events, and longer dry seasons, causing drought. Although rainfall during spring is likely to increase during the next 40 to 50 years, the total amount of water running off into rivers or recharging ground water is likely to decline 2.5 to 5 percent, as increased evaporation offsets the greater rainfall. Droughts are likely to be more severe, because periods without rain may be longer and very hot days will be more frequent". At the same time, the increased rate of flooding observed since 1958 is expected to continue and increase

"Droughts create a different set of challenges. When reservoirs release water for navigation along the Tennessee or Black Warrior rivers, too little water may be available for lake recreation or hydropower. Low flows from drought occasionally limit navigation along the Alabama River. During severe droughts in the Mississippi River’s watershed, however, navigation can potentially increase on the Tennessee-Tombigbee Waterway, which provides an alternative route to the Gulf of Mexico".

=== Agriculture ===
"Changing the climate will have both harmful and beneficial effects on farming. Seventy years from now, Alabama is likely to have 30 to 60 days per year with temperatures above 95°F, compared with about 15 days today. Even during the next few decades, hotter summers are likely to reduce yields of corn. But higher concentrations of atmospheric carbon dioxide increase crop yields, and that fertilizing effect is likely to offset the harmful effects of heat on soybeans, cotton, wheat, and peanuts—if adequate water is available. More severe droughts, however, could cause crop failures. Higher temperatures are also likely to reduce livestock productivity, because heat stress disrupts the animals' metabolism".

=== Risk to superfund sites ===
On November 22, 2019, the U.S. Government Accountability Office announced that the flooding, wildfires, and sealevel rise associated with climate change put eleven Superfund sites in Alabama at risk.

The sites are:

- Triana/Tennessee River, in Limestone/Madison/Morgan AL (flood hazard)
- Interstate Lead Co. (ILCO), in Leeds, AL (flood hazard)
- Alabama Plating Company, Inc., in Vincent, AL (high wildfire hazard potential, flood hazard)
- T.H. Agriculture & Nutrition Co. (Montgomery Plant), in Montgomery, AL (flood hazard)
- Mowbray Engineering Co., in Greenville, AL (flood hazard)
- Olin Corp. (McIntosh Plant), in McIntosh, AL (high wildfire hazard potential, flood hazard)
- Ciba-Geigy Corp. (McIntosh Plant), in McIntosh, AL (high wildfire hazard potential, flood hazard)
- Stauffer Chemical Co. (Lemoyne Plant), in Axis, AL (high wildfire hazard potential)
- Perdido Ground Water Contamination, in Perdido, AL (high wildfire hazard potential)
- Redwing Carriers, Inc. (Saraland), in Saraland, AL (high wildfire hazard potential, flood hazard, at risk in Category 4 or 5 hurricanes)
- American Brass Inc., in Headland, AL (specific hazard not identified)

== Observed effects of climate change ==
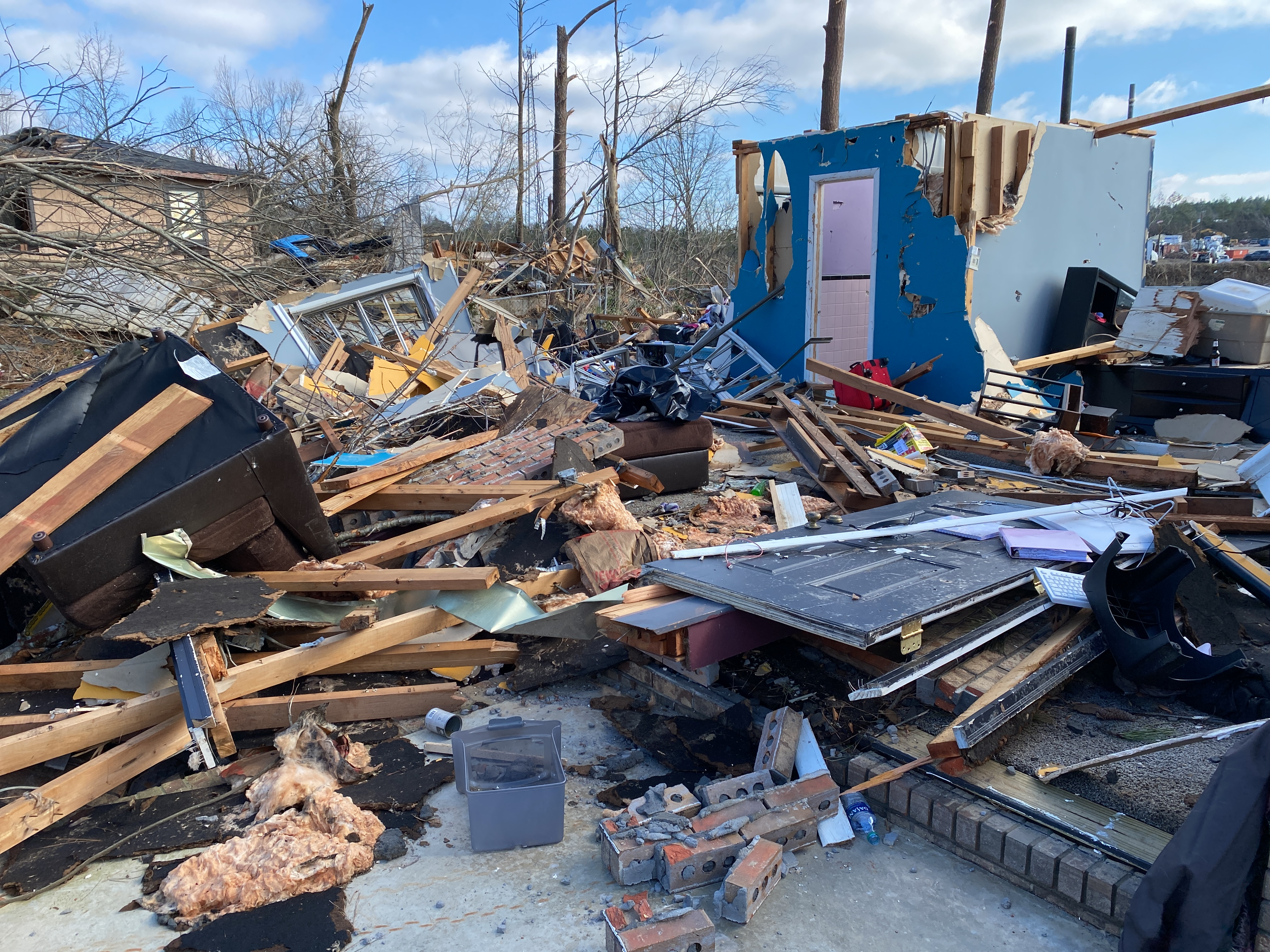
Tornado damage, Fultondale

A primary global effect of climate change is climatic temperature changes. However, the EPA notes that Alabama is unusual in that local temperatures have not increased in the state in the fifty years between 1966 and 2016. However, significant changes in rainfall has occurred. Rainfall has become more 'lumpy,' with longer periods of low rainfall and drought, as well as more intensely wet and rainy spring seasons. Overall rainfall has increased 5-10%, while the amount of precipitation during heavy rain events has increased 27%. While some rivers such as the Tennessee have dams to help prevent flooding, other rivers either have no dams or have dams with too little capacity to significantly reduce flooding. Heavy rains have caused the Pea River to flood Elba several times, and the Alabama River flooded two thousand homes in Selma and Montgomery during 1990".

This uneven rainfall pattern has led to second-order effects, including in the energy sector. "Droughts... affect the amount of electricity that Alabama Power and the Tennessee Valley Authority (TVA) can produce from their hydroelectric dams, which account for about 8 percent of the electricity produced in the state. During the 2007 drought, total production from the TVA’s hydroelectric plants fell by more than 30 percent, which forced the TVA to meet customer demand by using more expensive fuel-burning power plants".

Climate change may be affecting the rate of extreme weather events such as tornadoes and tropical storms. The EPA and the NOAA note that the rate of these events has increased in the last decades, and is expected to increase in the future. However, it remains unclear whether tornado or coastal storm rates have been affected by climate change in particular.

In July 2019, it was reported that giant wasp nests, having multiple queens and averaging three to four times the normal size, and sometimes growing as large as a car, were proliferating around the state. This was deemed to be partly due to milder winters in the state.

== Climate change policy in Alabama ==
Alabama ranked 15th in CO_{2} emissions in 2016, with 115.7 million metric tons of carbon emitted. Alabama ranked 11th in per capita carbon emissions, at 23.1 metric tons per person. (The state ranked 24th in population in the United States.) However, overall emissions in Alabama fell 20.6% between 2005 and 2016. This is largely the result of moving away from coal power generation. In 1990, 70% of Alabama's electricity came from coal. Since 2015, Alabama Power has closed 16 of its 23 coal units.

Alabama has only minor legislation for clean or renewable energy in 2019, and older, larger programs have been repealed. For instance, Governor Fob James implemented a 25% tax credit on active solar systems and a 12.5% credit on passive systems in 1981, but this law has since been repealed. Similarly, the Tennessee Valley Authority (TVA) at one point provided solar subsidies in northern Alabama as consumer incentives through its Green Power Providers program, but the TVA plans to end the program in late 2019. Solar and alternative energy providers and consumers find even the minor initiatives ineffective or perverse. The tax increase signed by Governor Kay Ivey added a $200 tax to electric vehicles and a $100 tax to plug-ins, nominally to support public installation of plug-in stations. However, the low number of such vehicles in Alabama (<1200) means that this tax fails to provide the capital for a robust program. This leads some drivers to see that part of the gas bill as purely punitive.

Some state agencies and projects do not take climate projects into account in their activities. This is the case for EPA planning in Alabama, and the U.S. Government Accountability Office warns that this lack of consideration increases risk to superfund sites.

== See also ==
- Climate of Alabama
- List of U.S. states and territories by carbon dioxide emissions
- Plug-in electric vehicles in Alabama
