= New Year's Eve 1963 snowstorm =

Winter storm in the United States

New Year's Eve snowstorm 1963
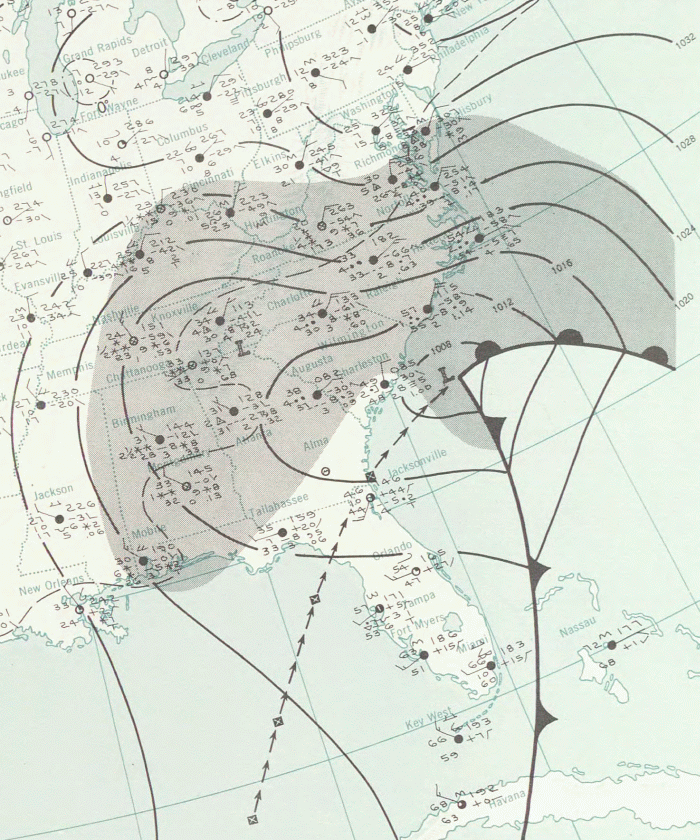
- Surface analysis of the cyclone during time of heaviest snow in Tennessee

Meteorological history
- Formed: December 30, 1963
- Dissipated: January 4, 1964

Category 2 "Minor" winter storm
- Regional snowfall index: 4.09 (NOAA)
- Lowest pressure: 970 mbar (hPa); 28.64 inHg
- Maximum snowfall or ice accretion: 17.1 inches (43 cm)

Overall effects
- Fatalities: 3
- Damage: $700,000 (1963 dollars)
- Areas affected: Central Gulf coast of the United States and Tennessee

From December 31, 1963, to January 1, 1964, a significant winter storm occurred over most of the Southern United States. The storm began when a surface low-pressure system moved northward through the eastern Gulf of Mexico and up the Fall Line east of the Appalachians, leading to a snowstorm from the central Gulf coast northward into Tennessee. Three people perished during the storm, and travel was severely restricted for a couple of days following the snowfall. The strong winds accompanied by heavy snow fall set historic new snowfall records in Alabama.

== Synoptic history ==
A shortwave in the southern stream of the Westerlies closed off as it approached the central United States Gulf of Mexico coastline. A surface cyclone formed in the Yucatán Peninsula of Mexico, slowly deepening as it moved north-northeast across the eastern Gulf. Cold air was residing across the Deep South in advance of this system, and as the surface cyclone tracked across northern Florida, heavy snowfall fell in its comma head from the Mouth of the Mississippi River northeast through Mississippi and Alabama into Tennessee, where the snow persisted into January 1. The cyclone ultimately moved along the east coast of the United States and Atlantic Canada, moving out into the far north Atlantic as a strengthening storm.

== Effects ==
Southeast Louisiana saw 4 to 8 inches (10 to 20 cm), mainly east of the Mississippi river, with New Orleans, Louisiana measuring 4.5 inches (11 cm). Damages totalled at least US$50,000 (1963 dollars). A stripe of 15 to 17 inches (38 to 43 cm) of snow fell across portions of Mississippi, northwest Alabama, and into Tennessee, with lesser amounts falling on either side of this axis. Tree branches and power lines were downed as over a foot of snow fell in a band across eastern Mississippi. Three people lost their lives in traffic accidents relating to the storm. Damage totalled at least US$50,000. Across Alabama, Huntsville recorded 17.1 inches (43 cm) of snow, setting a new record for daily, weekly, and monthly snowfall. It was the worst snow storm for the area since 1899. In Mississippi, Meridian saw 15 inches (38 cm) while Bay St. Louis saw a 10.5 inches (27 cm) snowfall. This became the snowiest day in Biloxi, Mississippi history. Mobile, Alabama measured 2 inches (5.1 cm) of snow. Many roads and highways were impassable for two to three days after the snow fell. Damage totaled at least US$550,000 (1963 dollars).

Across Tennessee, central and eastern sections of the state recorded over 6 inches (15 cm) of snow, with up to 16 inches in south-central Tennessee at Lawrenceburg. Power and telephone lines were downed. Several boats were sunk at their docks when a shed covering them collapsed under the weight of the snow. Damage totaled more than US$50,000. Farther north across Pennsylvania on January 1, 3 inches (7.6 cm) fell at Millersville.

== See also ==
- Surface weather analysis
