= List of mammals of Alabama =

The U.S. state of Alabama is home to these known indigenous mammal species. Historically, the state's indigenous species included one armadillo species, sixteen bat species, thirteen carnivore species, six insectivore species, one opossum species, four rabbit species, twenty-two rodent species, and three ungulate species. Four of these native species have become extirpated within the state, including the American bison (Bos bison), cougar (Puma concolor), red wolf (Canis rufus), and the elk (Cervus canadensis).

There are six known introduced mammal species in the state. These include the black rat, brown rat, fallow deer, wild boar, house mouse, and nutria.

Human predation and habitat destruction has placed several mammal species at risk of extirpation or extinction. The Alabama Department of Conservation and Natural Resources lists the conservation status of each species within the state with a rank of lowest, low, moderate, high, and highest concern.

== Armadillo ==
Image	Scientific name	Common name	Family	Conservation concern
	Dasypus novemcinctus	nine-banded armadillo common long-nosed armadillo	Dasypodidae	Low

== Bats ==
Image	Scientific name	Common name	Family	Conservation concern
	Corynorhinus rafinesquii	Rafinesque's big-eared bat	Vespertilionidae	Highest
	Eptesicus fuscus	big brown bat	Vespertilionidae	Lowest
	Lasionycteris noctivagans	silver-haired bat	Vespertilionidae	Moderate
	Lasiurus borealis	eastern red bat	Vespertilionidae	Lowest
	Lasiurus cinereus	hoary bat	Vespertilionidae	Moderate
	Lasiurus intermedius	northern yellow bat	Vespertilionidae	High
	Lasiurus seminolus	Seminole bat	Vespertilionidae	Lowest
	Myotis austroriparius	southeastern myotis	Vespertilionidae	High
	Myotis grisescens	gray bat	Vespertilionidae	Highest
	Myotis leibii	eastern small-footed myotis	Vespertilionidae	Moderate
	Myotis lucifugus	little brown bat	Vespertilionidae	High
	Myotis septentrionalis	northern long-eared myotis	Vespertilionidae	High
	Myotis sodalis	Indiana myotis	Vespertilionidae	Highest
	Nycticeius humeralis	evening bat	Vespertilionidae	Lowest
	Perimyotis subflavus	eastern pipistrelle tricolored bat	Vespertilionidae	Lowest
	Tadarida brasiliensis	Mexican free-tailed bat Brazilian free-tailed bat	Molossidae	High

== Carnivores ==
Image	Scientific name	Common name	Family	Conservation concern
	Canis latrans	coyote	Canidae	Lowest
	Canis rufus	red wolf	Canidae	Extirpated
	Urocyon cinereoargenteus	gray fox	Canidae	Lowest
	Vulpes vulpes	red fox	Canidae	Lowest
	Ursus americanus	American black bear	Ursidae	Highest Range limited to northeast Alabama and Mobile-Tensaw River Delta. Designated as state land mammal.
	Procyon lotor	raccoon	Procyonidae	Lowest
	Lontra canadensis	North American river otter	Mustelidae	Low
	Neogale frenata	long-tailed weasel	Mustelidae	High
	Neogale vison	American mink	Mustelidae	Low
	Mephitis mephitis	striped skunk	Mephitidae	Low
	Spilogale putorius	eastern spotted skunk	Mephitidae	High
	Lynx rufus	bobcat	Felidae	Lowest
	Puma concolor	cougar mountain lion panther puma	Felidae	Extirpated

== Eulipotyphlans ==
Image	Scientific name	Common name	Family	Conservation concern
	Blarina brevicauda	northern short-tailed shrew	Soricidae	Moderate
	Blarina carolinensis	southern short-tailed shrew	Soricidae	Moderate
	Cryptotis parva	North American least shrew	Soricidae	Moderate
	Sorex hoyi	American pygmy shrew	Soricidae	High
	Sorex longirostris	southeastern shrew	Soricidae	Moderate
	Scalopus aquaticus	eastern mole	Talpidae	Low

== Opossums ==
Image	Scientific name	Common name	Family	Conservation concern
	Didelphis virginiana	Virginia opossum North American opossum	Didelphidae	Low

== Rabbits ==
Image	Scientific name	Common name	Family	Conservation concern
	Sylvilagus aquaticus	swamp rabbit	Leporidae	Low
	Sylvilagus floridanus	eastern cottontail	Leporidae	Lowest
	Sylvilagus obscurus	Appalachian cottontail	Leporidae	High
	Sylvilagus palustris	marsh rabbit	Leporidae	High

== Rodents ==
Image	Scientific name	Common name	Family	Conservation concern
	Castor canadensis	North American beaver	Castoridae	Lowest
	Glaucomys volans	southern flying squirrel	Sciuridae	Lowest
	Marmota monax	woodchuck groundhog	Sciuridae	Lowest
	Sciurus carolinensis	eastern gray squirrel	Sciuridae	Lowest
	Sciurus niger	fox squirrel eastern fox squirrel Bryant's fox squirrel	Sciuridae	Low
	Tamias striatus	eastern chipmunk	Sciuridae	Lowest
	Geomys pinetis	southeastern pocket gopher	Geomyidae	High
	Microtus ochrogaster	prairie vole	Cricetidae	Moderate
	Microtus pinetorum	pine vole woodland vole	Cricetidae	Low
	Neotoma cinerea	eastern woodrat Florida woodrat	Cricetidae	Moderate
	Neotoma magister	Allegheny woodrat	Cricetidae	High
	Ochrotomys nuttalli	golden mouse	Cricetidae	Lowest
	Ondatra zibethicus	muskrat	Cricetidae	Lowest
	Oryzomys palustris	marsh rice rat	Cricetidae	Lowest
	Peromyscus gossypinus	cotton mouse	Cricetidae	Lowest
	Peromyscus leucopus	white-footed mouse	Cricetidae	Lowest
	Peromyscus polionotus	oldfield mouse beach mouse	Cricetidae	Moderate
	Peromyscus polionotus ammobates	Alabama beach mouse	Cricetidae	Highest Range limited to Fort Morgan Peninsula and Ono Island in Baldwin County.
	Peromyscus polionotus trissyllepsis	Perdido Key beach mouse	Cricetidae	Highest Range limited to the barrier island of Perdido Key in Baldwin County, Alabama and Escambia County, Florida.
	Reithrodontomys humulis	eastern harvest mouse	Cricetidae	Moderate
	Sigmodon hispidus	hispid cotton rat	Cricetidae	Lowest
	Mus musculus	house mouse	Muridae	Introduced
	Rattus rattus	black rat	Muridae	Introduced
	Rattus norvegicus	Norway rat brown rat	Muridae	Introduced
	Zapus hudsonius	meadow jumping mouse	Dipodidae	High
	Myocastor coypus	nutria coypu river rat	Myocastoridae	Introduced

== Cetaceans ==
Image	Scientific name	Common name	Family	Conservation concern
	Eubalaena glacialis	North Atlantic right whale	Balaenidae	Critically endangered
	Balaenoptera ricei	Rice's whale	Balaenopteridae	Critically endangered
	Balaenoptera acutorostrata	common minke whale	Balaenopteridae	Least concern
	Balaenoptera borealis	sei whale	Balaenopteridae	Endangered
	Balaenoptera brydei	Bryde's whale	Balaenopteridae	Least concern
	Balaenoptera musculus	blue whale	Balaenopteridae	Endangered
	Balaenoptera physalus	fin whale	Balaenopteridae	Vulnerable
	Megaptera novaeangliae	humpback whale	Balaenopteridae	Least concern
	Physeter macrocephalus	sperm whale	Physeteridae	Vulnerable
	Kogia breviceps	pygmy sperm whale	Kogiidae	Least concern
	Kogia sima	dwarf sperm whale	Kogiidae	Least concern
	Mesoplodon bidens	Sowerby's beaked whale	Ziphiidae	Least concern
	Mesoplodon densirostris	Blainville's beaked whale	Ziphiidae	Least concern
	Mesoplodon europaeus	Gervais' beaked whale	Ziphiidae	Least concern
	Peponocephala electra	melon-headed whale	Ziphiidae	Least concern
	Ziphius cavirostris	Cuvier's beaked whale	Ziphiidae	Least concern
	Feresa attenuata	pygmy killer Whale	Delphinidae	Least concern
	Globicephala macrorhynchus	short-finned pilot whale	Delphinidae	Least concern
	Grampus griseus	Risso's dolphin	Delphinidae	Least concern
	Lagenodelphis hosei	Fraser's dolphin	Delphinidae	Least concern
	Orcinus orca	killer whale	Delphinidae	Data deficient
	Pseudorca crassidens	false killer Whale	Delphinidae	Near threatened
	Stenella frontalis	Atlantic spotted dolphin	Delphinidae	Least concern
	Stenella coeruleoalba	striped dolphin	Delphinidae	Least concern
	Stenella attenuata	pantropical spotted dolphin	Delphinidae	Least concern
	Stenella longirostris	spinner dolphin	Delphinidae	Least concern
	Stenella clymene	Clymene dolphin	Delphinidae	Least concern
	Steno bredanensis	rough-toothed dolphin	Delphinidae	Least concern
	Tursiops truncatus	common bottlenose dolphin	Delphinidae	Least concern

== Ungulates ==
Image	Scientific name	Common name	Family	Conservation concern
	Bison bison	American bison American buffalo	Bovidae	Extirpated
	Cervus canadensis	elk	Cervidae	Extirpated; reintroduction in 1920s failed
	Dama dama	fallow deer	Cervidae	Introduced
	Odocoileus virginianus	white-tailed deer Virginia deer	Cervidae	Lowest
	Sus scrofa	wild boar	Suidae	Introduced
