= List of city nicknames in Alabama =

This partial list of city nicknames in Alabama compiles the aliases, sobriquets and slogans that cities in the U.S. state of Alabama are known by (or have been known by historically), officially and unofficially, to locals, outsiders or their tourism boards.

City nicknames can help establish a civic identity, help outsiders recognize a community, attract people to a community because of its nickname, promote civic pride, and build community unity. Nicknames and slogans that successfully create a new community "ideology or myth" are also believed to have economic value. This value is difficult to measure, but there are anecdotal reports of cities that have achieved substantial economic benefits by "branding" themselves by adopting new slogans.

Some unofficial nicknames are positive, while others are derisive. The unofficial nicknames listed here have been in use for a long time or have gained wide currency.

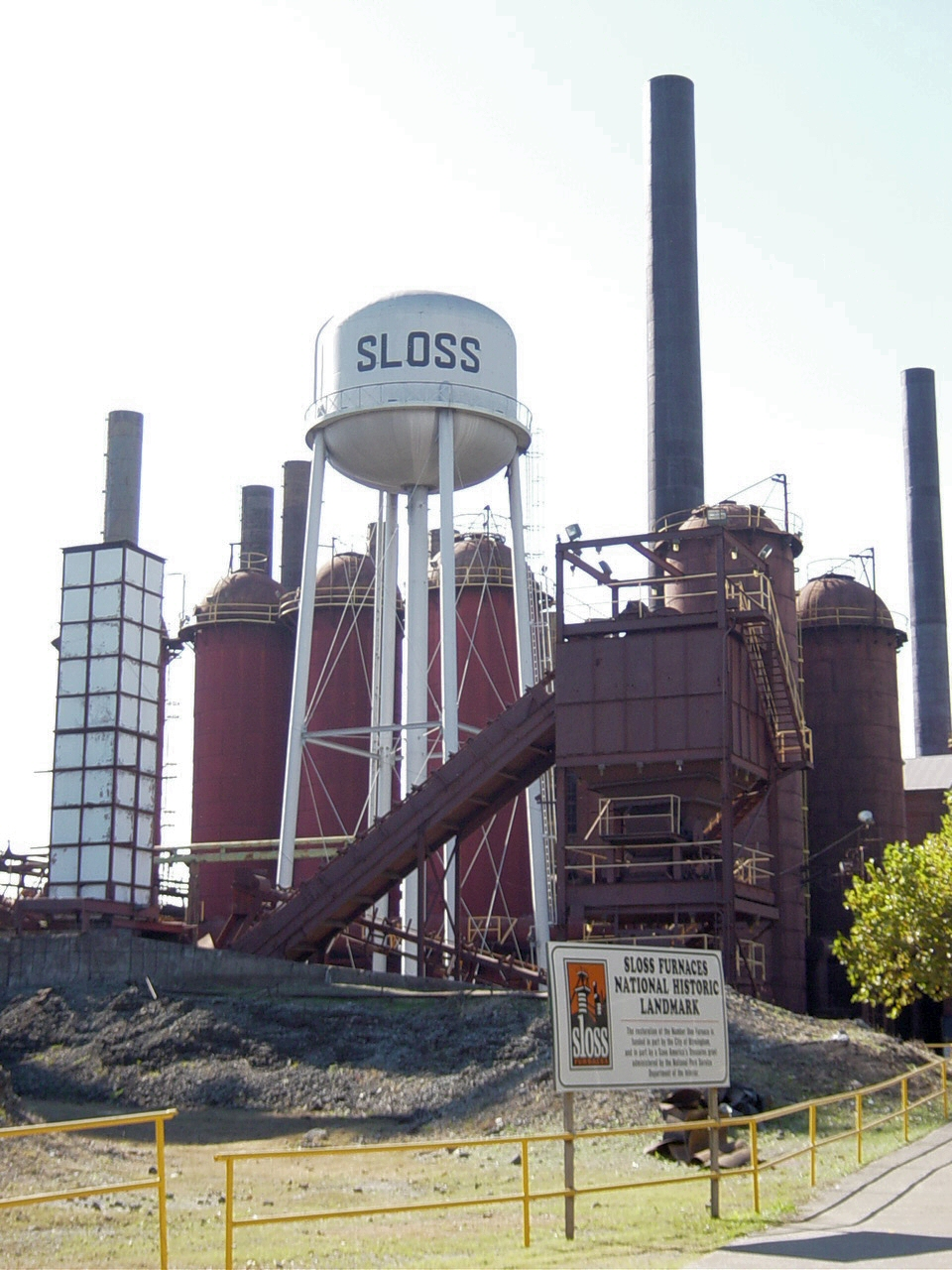
Birmingham's nickname "The Pittsburgh of the South" recalls the historical importance of the steel industry in both cities. This history is the focus of the Sloss Furnaces historical site in Birmingham.

- Alabaster – The City for Families
- Albertville – The Fire Hydrant Capital of the World
- Anniston – The Model City
- Auburn – Loveliest Village on the Plains
- Bayou La Batre – Seafood Capital of Alabama
- Bessemer – The Marvel City
- Birmingham
  - B'ham
  - Bombingham
  - The Magic City
  - The Pittsburgh of the South
  - The Steel City
  - The Tragic City
- Cedar Bluff – Crappie Capital of the World
- Daphne – The Jubilee City
- Decatur
  - Ballooning Capital of Alabama
  - The Chicago of the South
  - Home of America's First Wave Pool
  - The River City
  - Wave Pool Capital of the World
- Demopolis – City of the People
- Dothan
  - Condom Capital of the World
  - The Peanut Capital of the World
- Douglas – City of Eagles
- Enterprise – City of Progress
- Eufaula – Bass Capital of the World
- Fort Payne – Sock Capital of the World
- Gadsden – City of Champions
- Greenville – The Camellia City
- Haleyville – Home of 911
- Hartselle – The City of Southern Hospitality
- Hueytown – Home of the Alabama Gang
- Huntsville
  - The Rocket City
  - Watercress Capital of the World
- Jackson – The Pine City
- Jacksonville – Gem of the Hills
- Lincoln – The Motorsports City
- Madison – Where Progress Meets Preservation
- Mentone – Camping Capital of the World
- Mobile
  - The Azalea City
  - The City of Six Flags
  - The Home of Mardi Gras
  - The Port City
- Monroeville – Literary Capital of the World
- Montgomery
  - Capital of the South
  - The Cradle of the Confederacy
  - The Gump
- Mountain Brook
  - Small Kingdom [52]
- Muscle Shoals – The Hit Recording Capital of the World (formerly)
- Ozark – The Home of Fort Rucker
- Prattville
  - The Fountain City
  - The Preferred City
- Selma
  - Butterfly Capital of Alabama
  - Queen of the Alabama Black Belt
- Slocomb – The Tomato Capital of the South
- Summerdale – The Sunshine City
- Sylacauga – The Marble City
- Tuscaloosa
  - The Druid City
  - T-Town
  - Tusca Town
- Tuskegee – The Pride of the Swift-Growing South
- Union Springs – Bird Dog Field Trial Capital of the World
- Vestavia Hills – The Jewel City
- Wetumpka – Rumbling Waters
- Winfield – City on the Move

== See also ==
- List of city nicknames in the United States
- List of cities in Alabama
