= Plug-in electric vehicles in Alabama =

As of July 2023, there were 15,400 plug-in electric vehicles registered in Alabama.

== Government policy ==
As of August 2022, the state government does not offer any tax incentives for electric vehicle purchases.

As of 2021, the state government charges an annual $200 registration fee for electric vehicles.

As of 2026, Huntsville, Tuscaloosa, and Prattville require EV chargers for large developments.

== Charging stations ==
As of 2022, there were 276 public charging stations in Alabama.

The Infrastructure Investment and Jobs Act, signed into law in November 2021, allocates US$79 million to charging stations in Alabama.

== Manufacturing ==
Alabama has been widely proposed as a hub for electric vehicle manufacturing.

== By region ==
=== Birmingham ===
As of February 2021, there were 100 public charging stations in Birmingham.

=== Huntsville ===
As of June 2022, there were 15 public charging stations in the Huntsville metropolitan area.

=== Mobile ===
As of February 2022, there were 43 public charging stations in Mobile.

=== The Shoals ===
The first public DC charging station in The Shoals was installed in Tuscumbia in August 2023.
