= Alabama Clean Water Partnership =

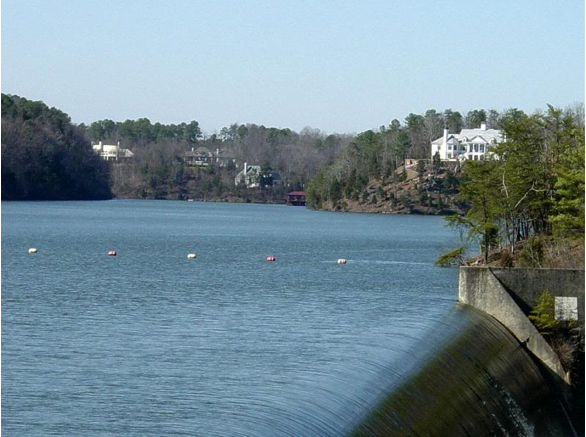
Lake Tuscaloosa in Tuscaloosa, AL.

The Alabama Clean Water Partnership (ACWP) is a coordinated effort of public and private stakeholders to restore and protect the State of Alabama's river basins.

ACWP guidelines are in accordance with the goals of the Clean Water Act (CWA) set by the US Environmental Protection Agency in 1972. The CWA includes requirements to fulfill the provisions of the 303(d) list. A statewide 501(c)(3) organization, the Alabama Clean Water Partnership encourages the involvement of local stakeholders in addressing the protection and restoration of Alabama's water resources. The organization maintains facilitators in the ten major river basins throughout the state. These facilitators organize and initiate activities within their working basins to bring a broad group of people together for a common good.

The ACWP is a non-adversarial organization. Lake Tuscaloosa is one of the partnership's cleanup projects, for which it organizes voluntary efforts. In 2010, participants collected rubbish and debris from the lake, gathering up 27,360 lbs.

The Chattahoochee River, part of one of ACWP's projects, was the subject of an interactive DVD developed by an environment educational center. It won the Panda Award at the 2004 Wildscreen Festival in Bristol England, a very prestigious award. This DVD is freely available the ACWP in conjunction with its partners to educators.
