= List of places in Alabama =

This list of current cities, towns, unincorporated communities, counties, and other recognized places in the U.S. state of Alabama also includes information on the number of counties in which the place lies, the name of its principal county, and its lower and upper ZIP Code bounds, if applicable.

== See also ==
- Alabama
- List of cities in Alabama
- List of counties in Alabama
