= List of Alabama area codes =

Area codes of Alabama

The U.S. state of Alabama is served by six area codes. When the North American Numbering Plan was first defined in 1947, Alabama was a single numbering plan area (NPA), with area code 205. This configuration existed until 1995 when area code 334 was added for the southeastern part of the state. In 1998, area code 256 was assigned for northern Alabama. It had an overlay area code 938 added in 2010, which required ten-digit dialing. The area code 251 in south Alabama was split from 334 in 2001. Area code 659 was installed in 2019, after having been proposed in 2001.

Area code	Established	Parent NPA	Overlay	Numbering plan area	Map
205	1947	–	205/659	Central and west central Alabama; Entire state before the creation of area code 334	
659	2019	205	205/659	Central and west central Alabama, including Birmingham, Tuscaloosa, Hoover, Northport, Jasper, Oneonta, Clanton, and Pell City	
256	1998	205	256/938	Northern and east central Alabama, including Huntsville-Decatur, Florence-Muscle Shoals, Gadsden, Anniston, Alexander City, and Sylacauga	
938	2010	256	256/938	Northern and east central Alabama, including Huntsville-Decatur, Florence-Muscle Shoals, Gadsden, Anniston, Alexander City, and Sylacauga	
334	1995	205	334/483	South central and southeastern Alabama, including Montgomery, Auburn-Opelika, Dothan, Valley, and Selma; southern half of the state before area code 251 created;	
483	2026	334	334/483	South central and southeastern Alabama, including Montgomery, Auburn-Opelika, Dothan, Valley, and Selma; southern half of the state before area code 251 created;	
251	2001	334	–	Southwestern Alabama, including Mobile, Monroeville, Atmore, Gulf Shores, and Daphne	

== See also ==
- List of North American Numbering Plan area codes
