= National Register of Historic Places listings in Barbour County, Alabama =

Location of Barbour County in Alabama

This is a list of the National Register of Historic Places listings in Barbour County, Alabama.

This is intended to be a complete list of the properties and districts on the National Register of Historic Places in Barbour County, Alabama, United States. Latitude and longitude coordinates are provided for many National Register properties and districts; these locations may be seen together in a Google map.

There are 19 properties and districts listed on the National Register in the county, including one National Historic Landmark.

This National Park Service list is complete through NPS recent listings posted May 1, 2026.

== Current listings ==
	Name on the Register	Image	Date listed	Location	City or town	Description
1	Bray-Barron House	Bray-Barron House	May 27, 1971 (#71000093)	N. Eufaula Ave. 31°53′50″N 85°08′40″W	Eufaula	
2	Cato House	Cato House	May 27, 1971 (#71000094)	823 W. Barbour St. 31°53′30″N 85°09′22″W	Eufaula	
3	Henry D. Clayton House	Henry D. Clayton House	December 8, 1976 (#76002259)	1 mile south of Clayton off State Route 30; 31°51′55″N 85°27′03″W	Clayton	Built around 1850, this was the home of Confederate General Henry D. Clayton, Sr., former President of the University of Alabama as well as his son Henry D. Clayton, Jr., a legislator, a judge and the author of the Clayton Antitrust Act of 1914.
4	Drewry-Mitchell-Moorer House	Drewry-Mitchell-Moorer House	April 13, 1972 (#72000154)	640 N. Eufaula Ave. 31°53′58″N 85°08′40″W	Eufaula	
5	Fendall Hall	Fendall Hall	July 28, 1970 (#70000097)	Barbour St. 31°53′30″N 85°25′30″W	Eufaula	
6	Grace Episcopal Church	Grace Episcopal Church	September 22, 1995 (#95001116)	Louisville St. south of Courthouse Sq. 31°52′38″N 85°27′00″W	Clayton	
7	Kendall Manor	Kendall Manor	January 14, 1972 (#72000155)	534 W. Broad St. 31°53′35″N 85°09′08″W	Eufaula	Also known as Kendall Manor Bed and Breakfast
8	Kiels-McNab House	Kiels-McNab House	January 21, 1982 (#82001996)	W. Washington St. 31°53′16″N 85°09′16″W	Eufaula	
9	Lore Historic District	Lore Historic District	December 12, 1973 (#73000330)	Bounded by Eufaula Ave. and Browder, Livingston, and Barbour Sts.; also roughly bounded by Browder St., Van Buren Ave., Washington St., and Sanford Ave. 31°53′48″N 85°08′36″W	Eufaula	Second set of boundaries represents a boundary increase, the Seth Lore and Irwinton Historic District, listed on August 14, 1986 with ref#86001534
10	McNab Bank Building	McNab Bank Building	June 24, 1971 (#71000095)	201 East Broad St. 31°53′33″N 85°08′37″W	Eufaula	Now known as The Lewis Agency, the building dates back to the 1850s and is one of the oldest bank buildings in Alabama.
11	Miller-Martin Town House	Miller-Martin Town House	December 16, 1974 (#74000399)	Louisville Ave. 31°52′29″N 85°27′07″W	Clayton	Built in 1859 by John H. Miller, this Gothic Revival townhouse is noteworthy for its hand-painted murals on the entrance hall ceiling which depict the four seasons as well as other designs on the parlor and dining hall ceilings.
12	Petty-Roberts-Beatty House	Petty-Roberts-Beatty House	January 21, 1974 (#74000400)	103 N. Midway; 31°52′43″N 85°26′58″W	Clayton	Octagon house built in 1861 by Benjamin Franklin Petty. One of only two antebellum octagonal houses built in Alabama and the only one to survive.
13	Sheppard Cottage	Sheppard Cottage	May 27, 1971 (#71000096)	504 E. Barbour St. 31°53′28″N 85°08′20″W	Eufaula	Built in 1837, Sheppard Cottage is the oldest known residence in Eufaula. The cottage still has original wood mantels, fireplaces, and oak flooring.
14	Shorter Mansion	Shorter Mansion	January 14, 1972 (#72000156)	340 N. Eufaula Ave. 31°53′46″N 85°08′46″W	Eufaula	
15	Governor Chauncy Sparks House	Governor Chauncy Sparks House	June 28, 1972 (#72000157)	257 West Broad St. 31°53′40″N 85°08′45″W	Eufaula	The Sparks-Irby House was the home of the 44th Alabama Governor, Chauncey Sparks and his sister, Mrs. Louise Sparks Flewellen.
16	Spring Hill Methodist Church	Spring Hill Methodist Church	February 16, 1996 (#96000110)	Southern side of County Road 89, approximately 750 feet west of its junction with County Road 49; 32°04′47″N 85°20′22″W	Spring Hill	Greek revival church built in 1841 by John Fletcher Comer, father of B. B. Comer.
17	The Tavern	The Tavern	October 6, 1970 (#70000098)	105 Riverside Dr. 31°53′30″N 85°08′30″W	Eufaula	Originally built in the 1830s, The Tavern is Eufaula's oldest frame structure. During its history, it has been used as an Episcopal Church, a Confederate hospital, and as an inn where it accommodated Chattahoochee River travelers and the local gentry.
18	Wellborn	Wellborn	July 14, 1971 (#71000097)	630 East Broad St. 31°53′37″N 85°08′23″W	Eufaula	Also known as the Dr. Levi Thomas House, this classic Greek Revival mansion, dated from 1839, was the first of its sort to be built in this area. It was moved to its present location from 134 Livingston Avenue. The facade and inside floor plan remain little changed. It currently serves as business offices.
19	Woodlane Plantation	Woodlane Plantation	March 29, 2006 (#06000183)	State Route 431, S. 31°50′59″N 85°10′22″W	Eufaula	

== See also ==
- List of National Historic Landmarks in Alabama
- National Register of Historic Places listings in Alabama
