= Walthour =

Walthour is a surname. Notable people with the surname include:

- Henry C. Walthour (1874–1940), American businessman
- Isaac Walthour (1930–1977), American basketball player
- John B. Walthour (1904–1952), bishop of Atlanta, US
- Margaret Walthour Lippitt (1872–1964), American artist
- Robert Walthour (1878–1949), American cyclist
