= Henry D. Clayton House =

Historic house in Alabama, United States

- U.S. National Register of Historic Places
- U.S. National Historic Landmark
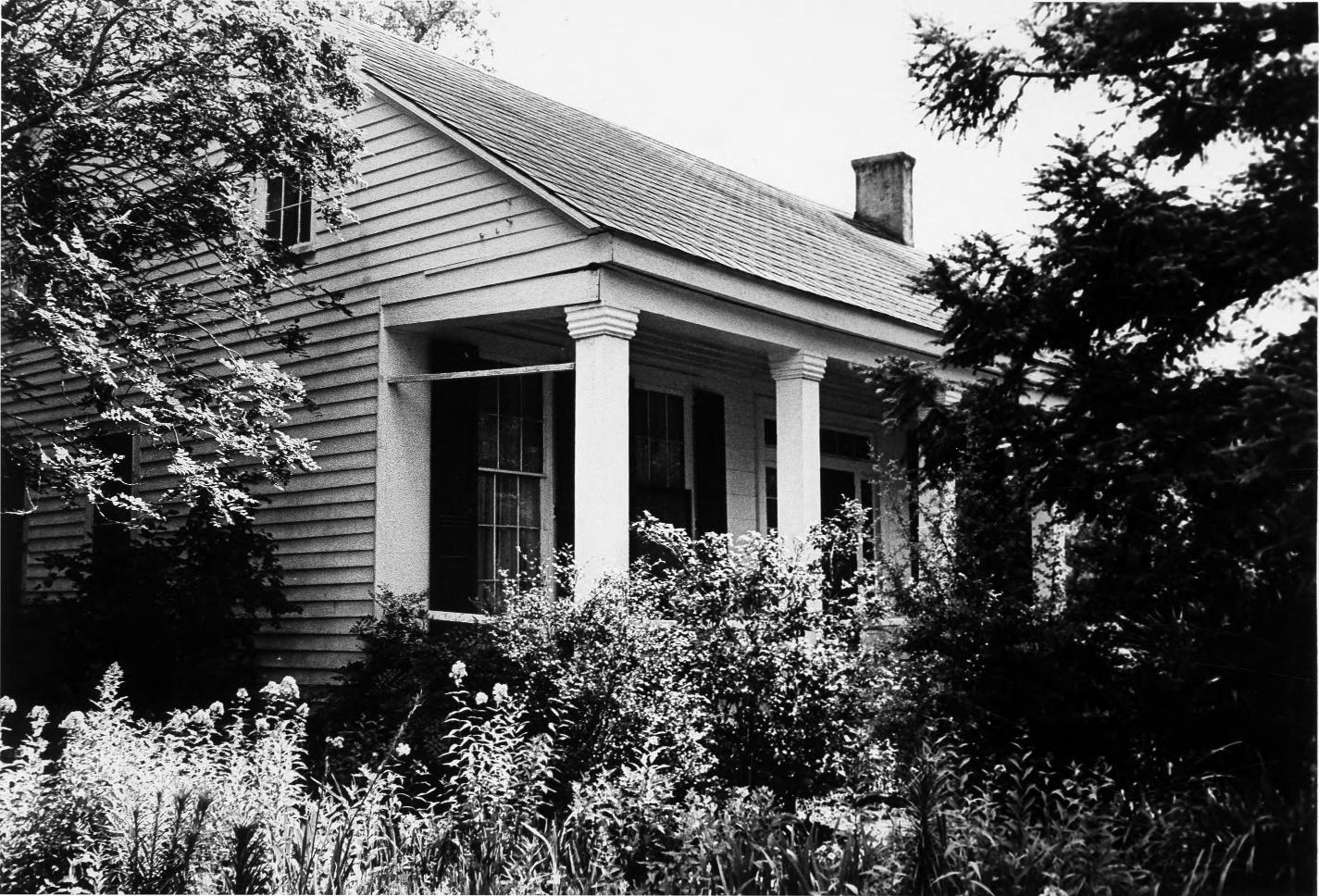
- Henry De Lamar Clayton House, 1975

- Location within Alabama Location within the United States
- Location: SR 30 in Clayton, Alabama
- Coordinates: 31°51′56.2″N 85°27′08.5″W
- Area: c. 51 acres (21 ha)
- Built: 1850
- Architect: Henry D. Clayton, Sr.
- NRHP reference No.: 76002259

Significant dates
- Added to NRHP: December 8, 1976
- Designated NHL: December 8, 1976

The Henry D. Clayton House is a historic plantation house in Clayton, Alabama, United States, most notable as the birthplace and childhood home of Henry De Lamar Clayton, Jr. (1857–1929), a legislator and judge. Clayton came to prominence while serving in the United States Congress as the author of the Clayton Antitrust Act of 1914. This act prohibited particular types of conduct deemed not to be in the best interest of a competitive market. He was appointed a Federal District Judge in 1914, where he became recognized as an advocate for judicial reform. The house was built by his father, Confederate General Henry DeLamar Clayton, Sr. It was declared a National Historic Landmark on December 8, 1976.

== Description and history ==
The Henry D. Clayton House is located approximately 1 mile (1.6 km) from Clayton on a remnant of the former 1,000-acre (400 ha) Clayton Plantation. It is accessed via the original plantation drive, extending south from SR 30 at Clayton Street. The house is a 1 1/2-story wood-frame structure, with a gabled roof and clapboarded exterior. The main roof extends beyond the north facade to shelter a porch with square supports. A shed-roofed porch also extends across part of the house's rear, where it joins with the kitchen ell. Outbuildings in the plantation complex include a smokehouse, carriage barn, and a small cottage used by Henry Clayton Jr. as his office.

The house was built circa 1850 by Henry DeLamar Clayton, Sr., who served in the American Civil War as a general in the Confederate Army. It was the birthplace and childhood home of his son, Henry Clayton Jr. The younger Clayton studied law at the University of Alabama, and embarked on a political career in the Democratic Party in 1880. In 1910, as head of the House Judiciary Committee, he successfully prosecuted the impeachment of Robert W. Archbald, a Commerce Court judge accused of profiting from his position. His best-known accomplishment was the passage of the Clayton Antitrust Act, a significant amendment to the Sherman Antitrust Act.

== See also ==
- List of National Historic Landmarks in Alabama
- National Register of Historic Places listings in Barbour County, Alabama
