= Miller-Martin Town House =

Historic house in Alabama, United States

- U.S. National Register of Historic Places
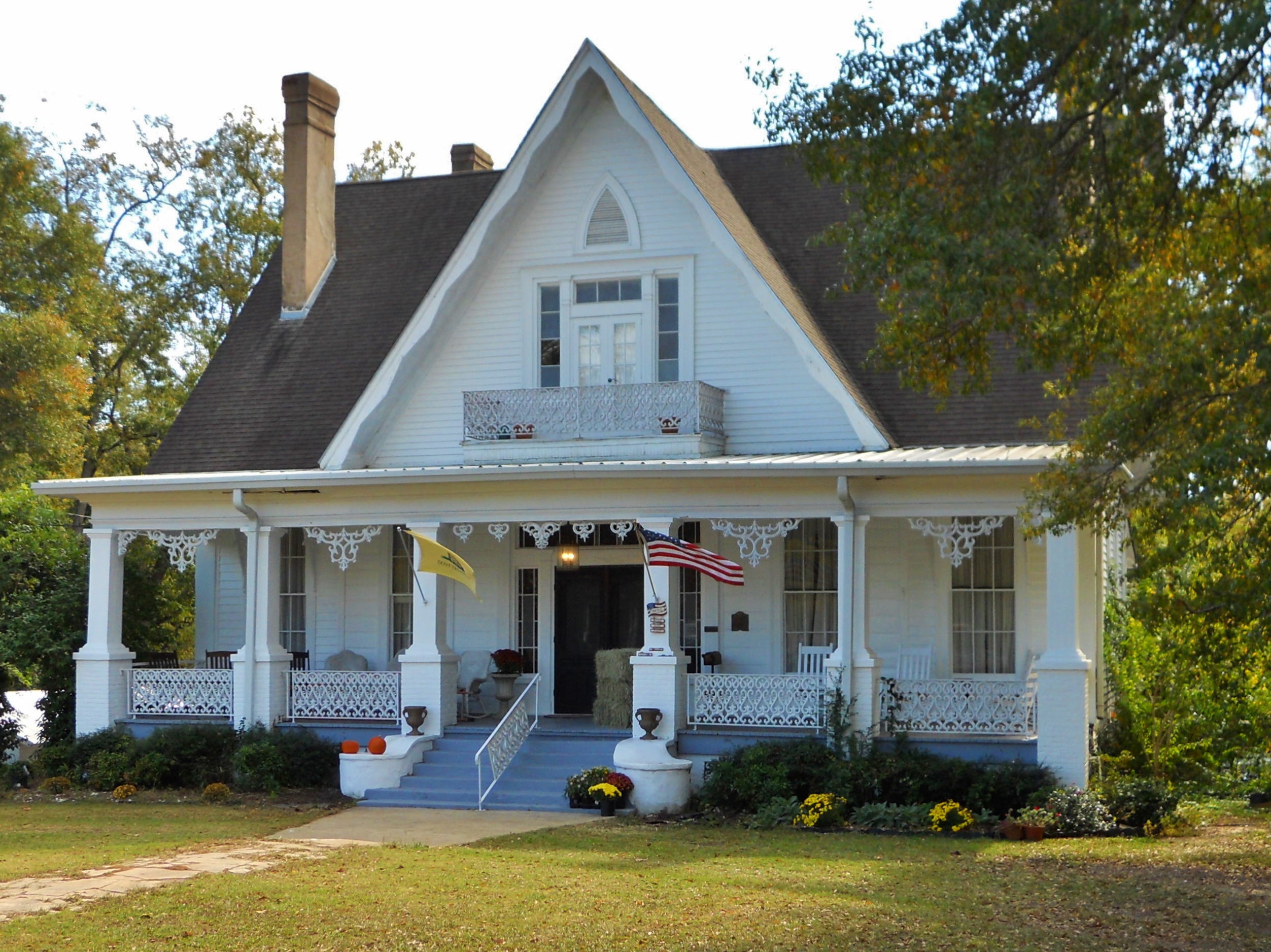
- The Miller-Martin Town House in 2011

- Location within Alabama Location within the United States
- Location: Louisville Avenue, Clayton, Alabama
- Coordinates: 31°52′29″N 85°27′7″W
- Area: 1 acre (0.40 ha)
- Built: 1859
- Architectural style: Gothic Revival
- NRHP reference No.: 74000399
- Added to NRHP: December 16, 1974

The Miller-Martin Town House is a historic house in Clayton, Alabama, U.S.. It was built as a townhouse for John H. Miller in 1859, and it was designed in the Gothic Revival architectural style. In 1871, it was purchased by Judge Henry Clinton Russell, who served on Barbour County's probate court. In 1915, it was purchased by John Council Martin, who went on to serve as the mayor of Clayton from 1926 to 1930. It was later inherited by his daughter. It has been listed on the National Register of Historic Places since December 16, 1974.
