= Margaret Walthour Lippitt =

American painter and teacher (1872–1964)

Margaret Walthour Lippitt (November 5, 1872 – July 23, 1964) was an oil painter and art teacher.

== Early life ==
Margaret Walthour was born in 1872 in Clayton, Alabama, to Andrew Maxwell Walthour and Sarah Clayton. She was their firstborn, followed two years later by Henry Clayton Walthour, who became a noted businessman in Savannah, Georgia. As a young woman, she taught art at a private girls' school in Tuscaloosa, where she lived with her grandfather, Major General Henry D. Clayton, then president of the University of Alabama at Tuscaloosa. She was also the granddaughter of Captain William L. Walthour.

Lippitt spent several years in Washington, D.C., living with her aunt and uncle, Senator James L. Pugh, while she studied painting under Howard Helmick. While in another of Helmick's classes in Blowing Rock, North Carolina, Lippitt met her future husband, Devereux H. Lippitt, whom she married in 1894.

In 1898, Lippitt attended the Académie Julian. John Singer Sargent commented on her Titian hair when she was sketching at the Louvre. In 1904 she moved to Bremen for her husband's business. While there, she frequently visited the artists' colony at Worpswede and befriended Paula Modersohn-Becker and Rilke.

== Death ==
Lippitt died in 1964, aged 91. She was interred in Oakdale Cemetery in Wilmington, North Carolina. She had survived her husband by thirty years and was buried alongside him.

=== Legacy ===
The University of North Carolina at Wilmington has named a scholarship in Lippitt's honor.
