= Bertram T. Clayton =

American politician

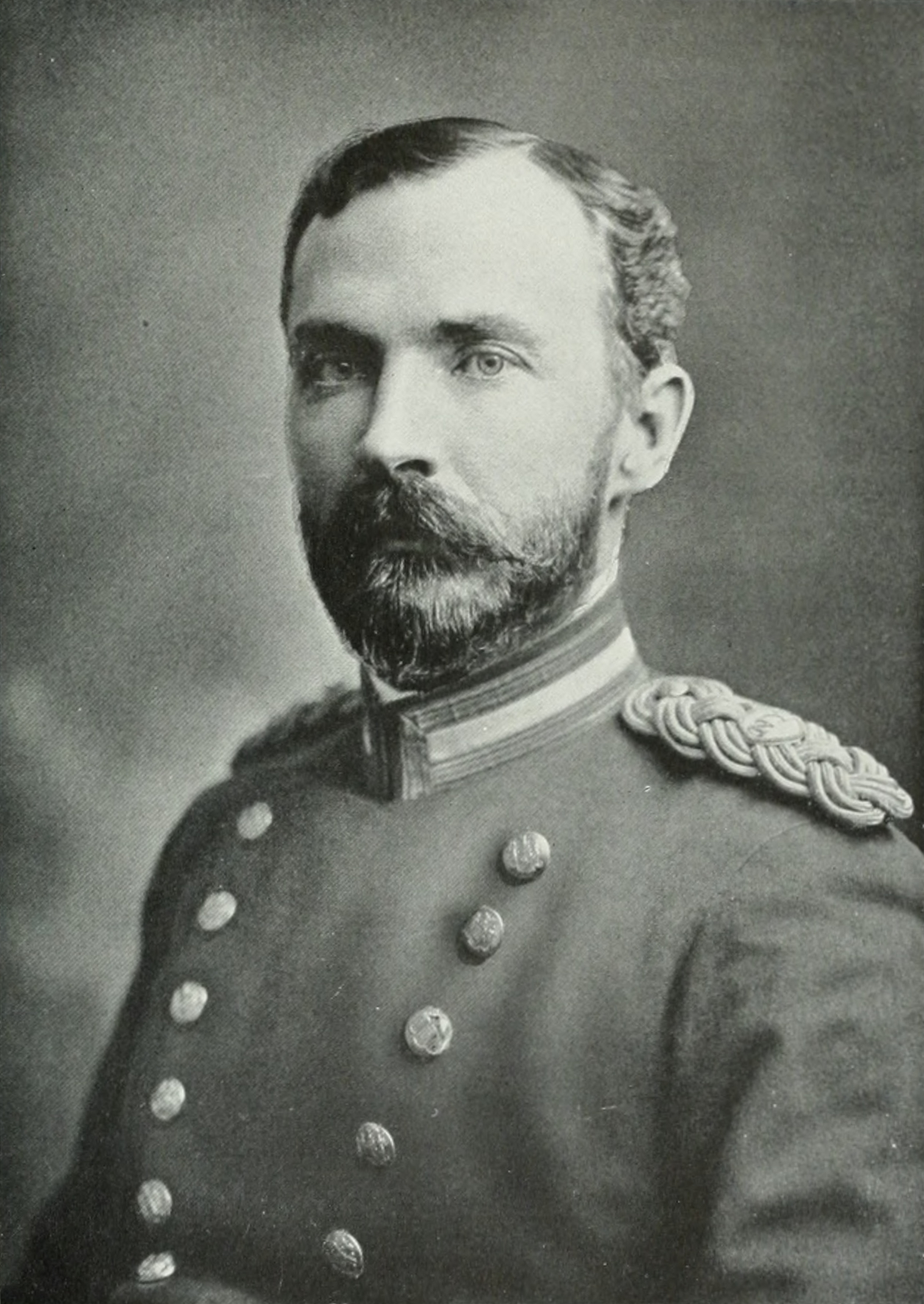
- Clayton c. 1899–1901

Member of the U.S. House of Representatives from New York's 4th district
- In office March 4, 1899 – March 3, 1901
- Preceded by: Israel F. Fischer
- Succeeded by: Harry A. Hanbury

Personal details
- Born: Bertram Tracy Clayton; October 19, 1862 Clayton, Alabama, US
- Died: May 30, 1918 (aged 55) Montdidier, Moselle, France
- Cause of death: Killed in action
- Resting place: Arlington National Cemetery
- Party: Democratic
- Spouse: Mary Elizabeth D'Aubert
- Relatives: Henry D. Clayton (father); Henry D. Clayton Jr. (brother)
- Education: United States Military Academy

Military service
- Allegiance: United States
- Branch/service: United States Army
- Years of service: 1886–1888; 1898; 1901–1918
- Rank: Second Lieutenant; Captain; Colonel
- Unit: 1st Infantry Division
- Battles/wars: Spanish–American War; World War I †

Bertram Tracy Clayton (October 19, 1862 – May 30, 1918) was an American soldier and politician who served as a U.S. representative from New York from 1899 to 1901.

== Biography ==
Born on the Clayton estate near Clayton, Alabama, he went on to attend the United States Military Academy, graduating 45th of 77th in 1886 with John J. Pershing. He was then appointed a second lieutenant in the Eleventh Regiment, United States Infantry and served until April 30, 1888, when he resigned to go into business as a civil engineer. On May 20, 1898, he went on to serve with Troop C, New York Volunteer Cavalry (Brooklyn's Own) during the Spanish–American War in Puerto Rico, winning distinction.

=== Tenure in Congress ===
After the war, Clayton served in the House of Representatives from 1899 until 1901, representing New York's fourth district. After an unsuccessful reelection bid, he was appointed as a captain in the Regular Army.

=== World War I ===
He stayed on active duty and was promoted several times up to the rank of colonel, serving in the Quartermaster Corps until World War I.

While serving in France as quartermaster of the 1st Infantry Division, Clayton was killed during a German air raid on American trenches. He was the highest-ranking West Point graduate killed in action during the war. Clayton is buried at Arlington National Cemetery with his wife, Mary Elizabeth D'Aubert Clayton.

=== Family ===
His brother, Henry De Lamar Clayton, Jr., also served as a Member of Congress from their home state, Alabama. Their father, Henry DeLamar Clayton, Sr., was a prominent judge and major general in the Confederate army during the American Civil War and president of the University of Alabama.

Political offices
U.S. House of Representatives
Preceded by Israel F. Fischer	Member of the U.S. House of Representatives from New York's 4th congressional district 1899–1901	Succeeded by Harry A. Hanbury
