= Kiels-McNab House =

Historic house in Alabama, United States

- U.S. National Register of Historic Places
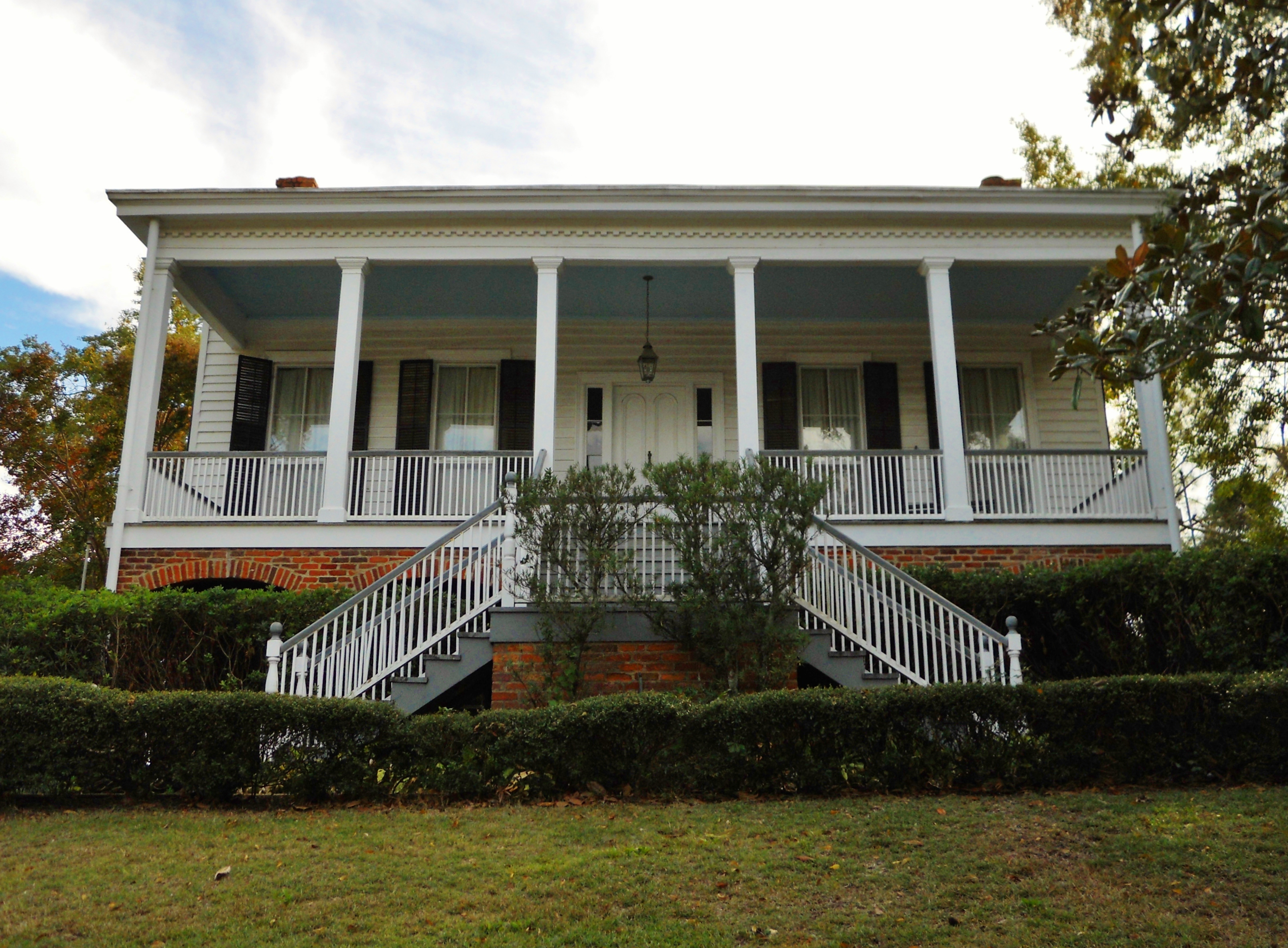
- The house in 2011

- Location within Alabama Location within the United States
- Location: West Washington St., Eufaula, Alabama
- Coordinates: 31°53′16″N 85°9′16″W
- Area: 1.6 acres (0.65 ha)
- Built: c. 1840
- Architectural style: Greek Revival
- NRHP reference No.: 82001996
- Added to NRHP: January 21, 1982

The Kiels-McNab House is a historic house located on west Washington Street in Eufaula, Alabama, United States.

== Description and history ==
It was originally built as a Greek Revival-style cottage of frame and brick construction for Elias M. Kiels in about 1840. In the aftermath of the American Civil War of 1861–1865, the cottage was expanded to a proper mansion. In 1880, it was purchased by John McNab, a banker. It remained in the McNab family until 1973.

It was listed on the National Register of Historic Places on January 21, 1982.
