= Kendall Manor =

Historic house in Alabama, United States

- U.S. National Register of Historic Places
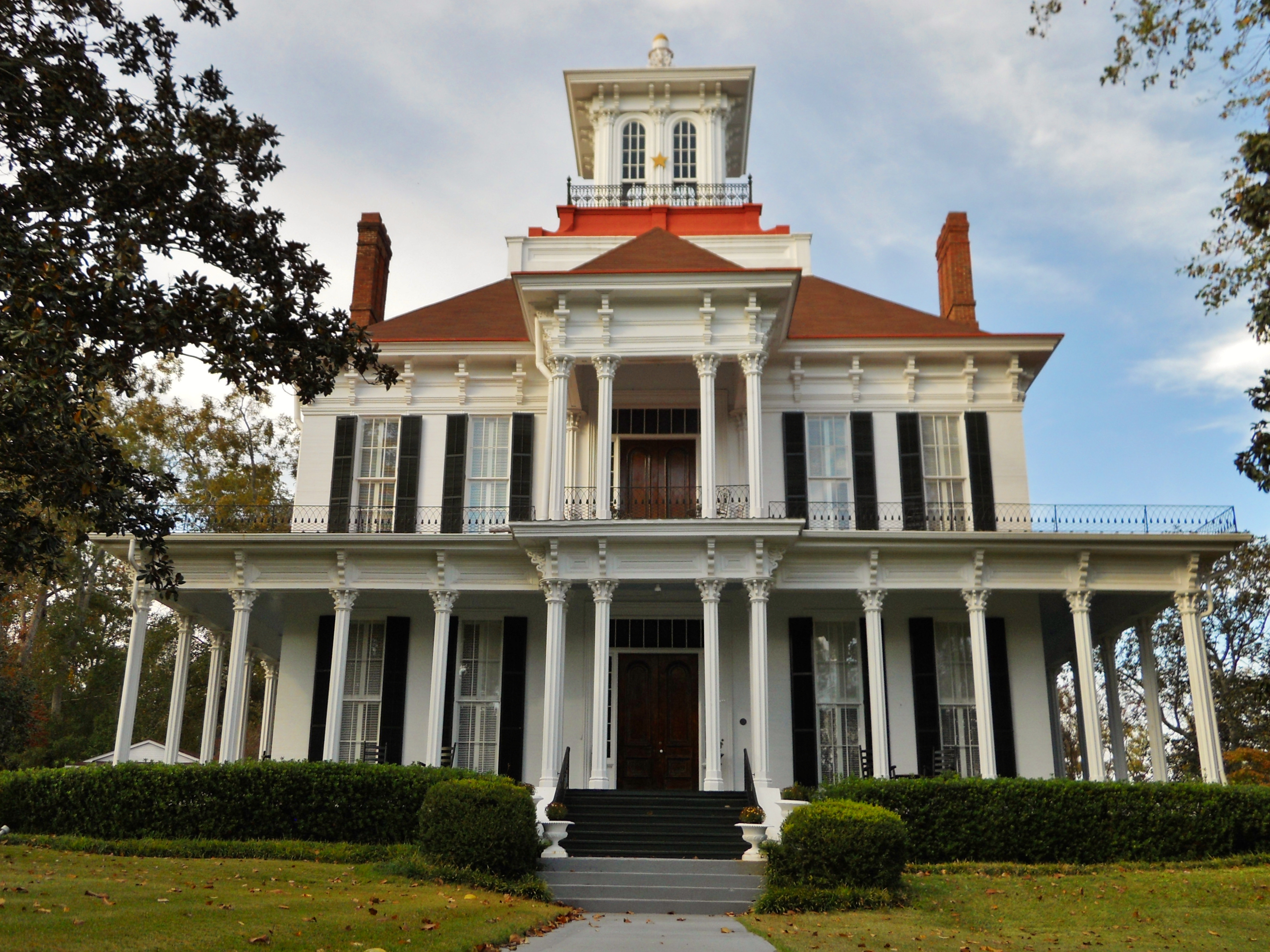
- Kendall Manor in 2011

- Location within Alabama Location within the United States
- Location: 534 West Broad Street, Eufaula, Alabama
- Coordinates: 31°53′35″N 85°9′8″W
- Area: less than one acre
- Built: 1860
- Architectural style: Italianate
- NRHP reference No.: 72000155
- Added to NRHP: January 14, 1972

Kendall Manor is a historic mansion in Eufaula, Alabama, U.S.. It was built for planter James Turner Kendall. It was designed by architect H. George Whipple in the Italianate style. Construction began prior to the outset of the American Civil War of 1861–1865, and it was completed in 1867. It remained in the Kendall family; by the 1970s, it belonged to Dr. Kendall Eppes, Kendall's great-grandson. It has been listed on the National Register of Historic Places since January 14, 1972.
