= Henry B. Steagall =

American politician (1873–1943)

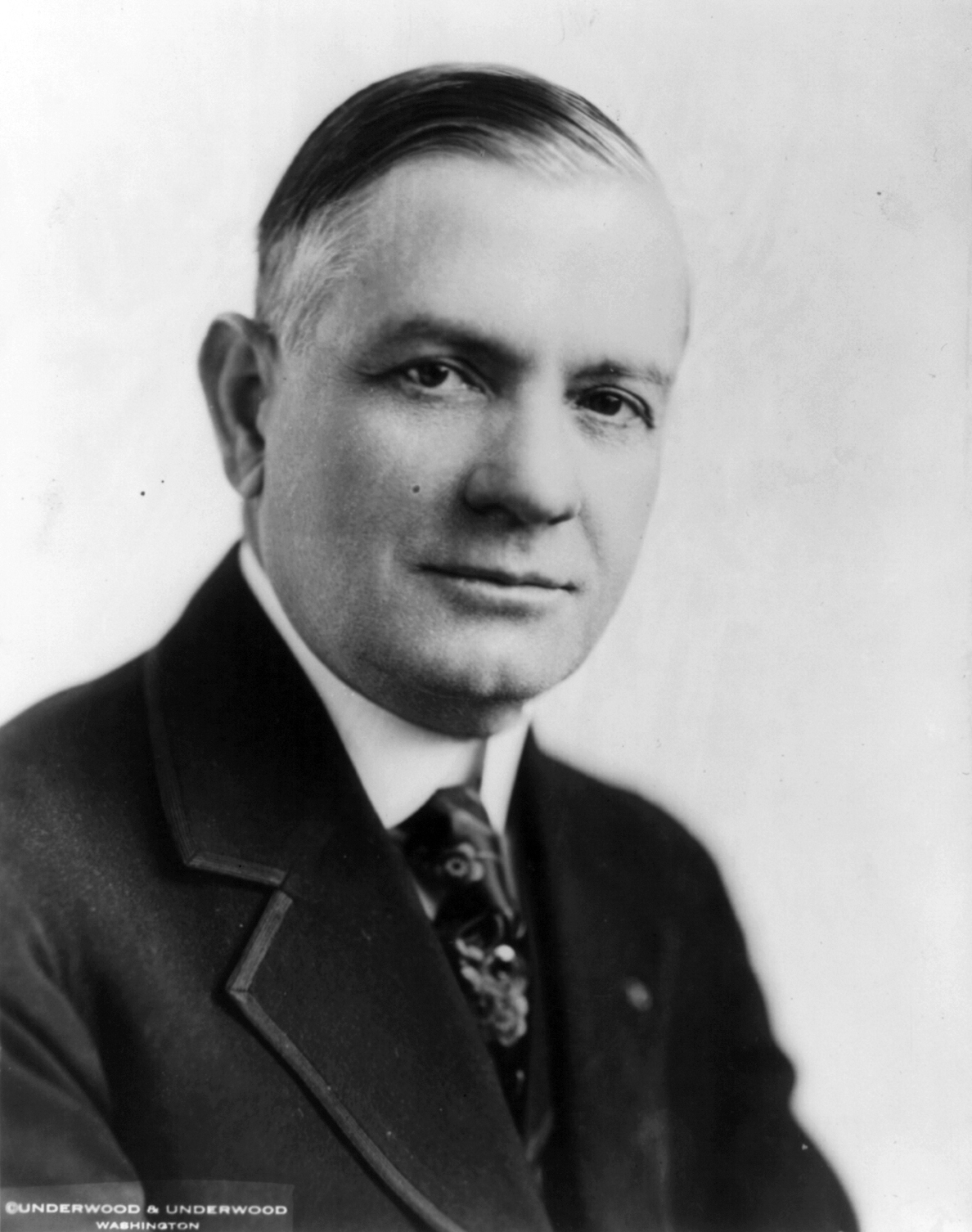

Member of the U.S. House of Representatives from Alabama's 3rd district
- In office March 4, 1915 – November 22, 1943
- Preceded by: William O. Mulkey
- Succeeded by: George W. Andrews

Chairman of the Committee on Banking and Currency
- In office March 4, 1931 – November 22, 1943
- Preceded by: Louis T. McFadden

Personal details
- Born: Henry Bascom Steagall; May 19, 1873 Clopton, Alabama, U.S.
- Died: November 22, 1943 (aged 70) Washington, D.C., U.S.
- Party: Democratic

Henry Bascom Steagall (May 19, 1873 – November 22, 1943) was a United States representative from Alabama. He was chairman of the Committee on Banking and Currency and in 1933, he co-sponsored the Glass–Steagall Act with Carter Glass, an act that introduced banking reforms and established the Federal Deposit Insurance Corporation (FDIC). With Senator Robert F. Wagner, he co-sponsored the Wagner-Steagall National Housing Act of September 1937 which created the United States Housing Authority.

== Life ==
Steagall was born in Clopton, Alabama, on May 19, 1873. His paternal grandfather came to America from England. Steagall attended the Southeast Alabama Agricultural School at Abbeville and graduated from the law department of the University of Alabama in Tuscaloosa in 1893. He served as the county solicitor of Dale County from 1902 to 1908 and was a Democratic member of the Alabama House of Representatives from 1906 to 1907. Steagall was elected to the U.S. House of Representatives for Alabama's 3rd District in 1915 and served until 1943. He voted in favor of the 1941 Lend Lease act to provide military aid to the United Kingdom in World War II. He died while in office on November 22, 1943, in Washington, D.C. He was inducted into the Alabama Lawyers' Hall of Fame in 2002.

== Pronunciation ==
Asked how to say his name, he told The Literary Digest that it was stee-gall (like the words tea and gall), with equal stress on each syllable. He added, "This pronunciation is generally used throughout the South, and rarely used in the North. American northerners persist in stressing the first syllable and rhyming the name with 'eagle'." He was known by African-Americans in Alabama as "Marse Henry."

== See also ==
- List of members of the United States Congress who died in office (1900–1949)

U.S. House of Representatives
Preceded by William O. Mulkey	Member of the U.S. House of Representatives from Alabama's 3rd congressional district 1915–1943	Succeeded by George W. Andrews
