= Drewry-Mitchell-Moorer House =

Historic house in Alabama, United States

- U.S. National Register of Historic Places
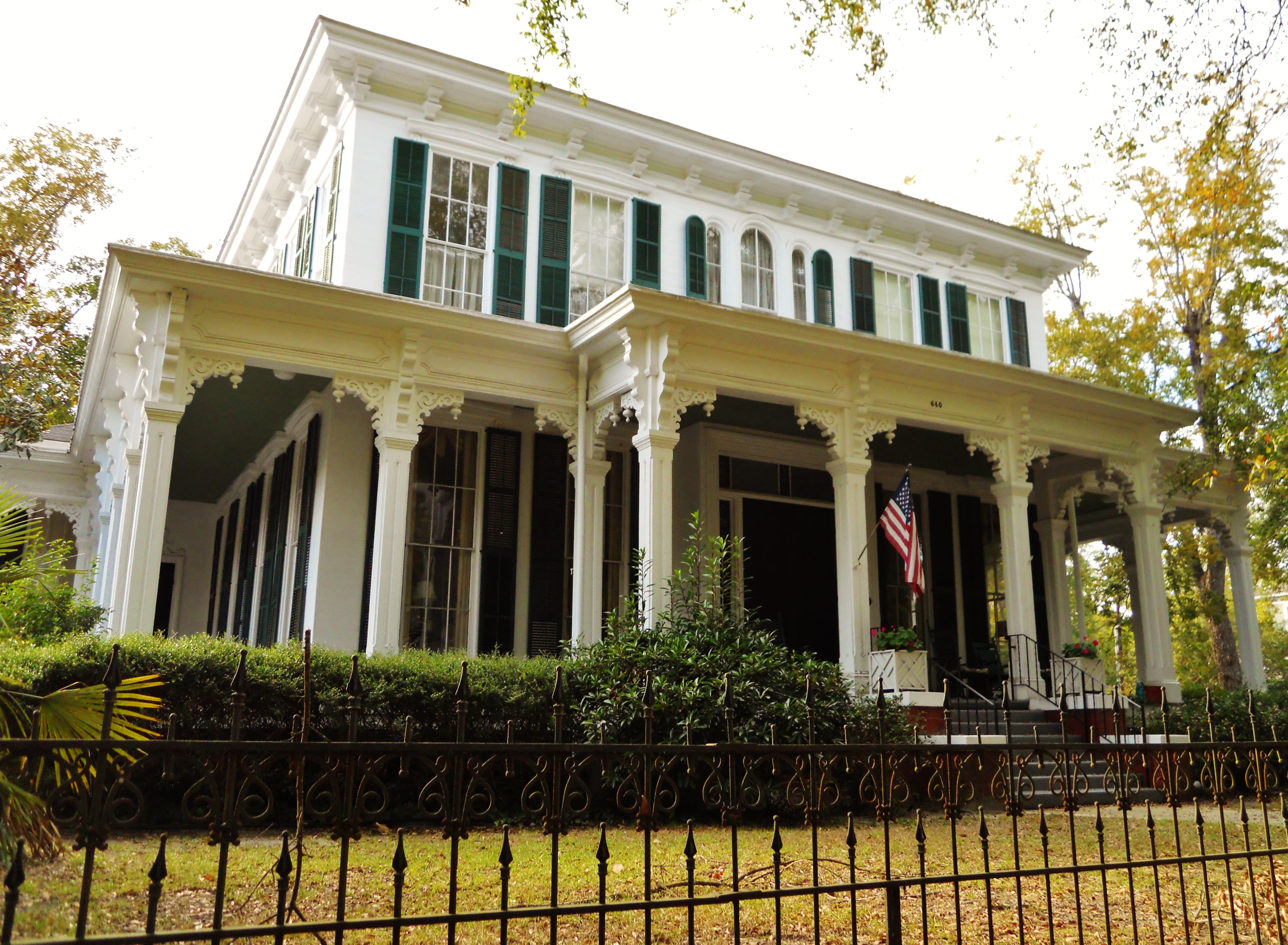
- The Drewry-Mitchell-Moorer House in 2011

- Location within Alabama Location within the United States
- Location: 640 North Eufaula Avenue, Eufaula, Alabama
- Coordinates: 31°53′58″N 85°8′40″W
- Area: 1.5 acres (0.61 ha)
- Built: 1867
- Architectural style: Italianate
- NRHP reference No.: 72000154
- Added to NRHP: April 13, 1972

The Drewry-Mitchell-Moorer House is a historic mansion in Eufaula, Alabama, U.S.. It was built for Dr. John Drewry in 1867. It remained in the family until the 1970s, having been inherited by Drewry's daughter, Lilly Mitchell, followed by her son, A. C. Mitchell, and his daughter, Mrs. W. D. Moorer. It has been listed on the National Register of Historic Places since April 13, 1972.
