= William Oscar Mulkey =

American politician

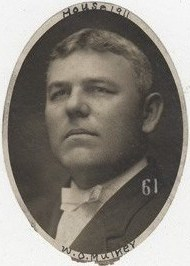

Member of the U.S. House of Representatives from Alabama's 3rd district
- In office June 29, 1914 – March 3, 1915
- Preceded by: Henry D. Clayton
- Succeeded by: Henry B. Steagall

Member of the Alabama House of Representatives
- In office 1911

Personal details
- Born: William Oscar Mulkey; July 27, 1871 Brundidge, Alabama
- Died: June 30, 1943 (aged 71) Geneva, Alabama
- Party: Democratic

William Oscar Mulkey (July 27, 1871 – June 30, 1943) was a U.S. representative from Alabama.

Born in Brundidge, Alabama, Mulkey attended the public schools and graduated from State Normal College, Troy, Alabama, (now Troy University) in 1892. He studied law. He was admitted to the bar in 1893 and commenced practice in Troy, Alabama, in 1894. He served as member of the State constitutional convention in 1901. He served in the State house of representatives in 1911.

Mulkey was elected as a Democrat to the Sixty-third Congress to fill the vacancy caused by the resignation of Henry D. Clayton and served from June 29, 1914, to March 3, 1915. He was not a candidate for renomination in 1914. He resumed the practice of law. He died in Geneva, Alabama, June 30, 1943. He was interred in Geneva Cemetery.

U.S. House of Representatives
Preceded by Henry D. Clayton	Member of the U.S. House of Representatives from Alabama's 3rd congressional district June 29, 1914 – March 3, 1915	Succeeded by Henry B. Steagall
