= Henry C. Walthour =

American businessman

- Pictured around 1930
- Born: February 22, 1874; Opelika, Alabama, U.S.
- Died: September 21, 1940 (aged 66); Savannah, Georgia, U.S.
- Resting place: Bonaventure Cemetery, Savannah, Georgia, U.S.
- Spouse: Helen Buckman (m. 1901–1940; his death)
- Children: 4
- Relatives: Margaret Walthour Lippitt (sister)

Henry Clayton Walthour (February 22, 1874 – September 21, 1940) was an American businessman based in Savannah, Georgia. He was described as being "one of the outstanding figures in business circles" of that city.

== Early life and career ==
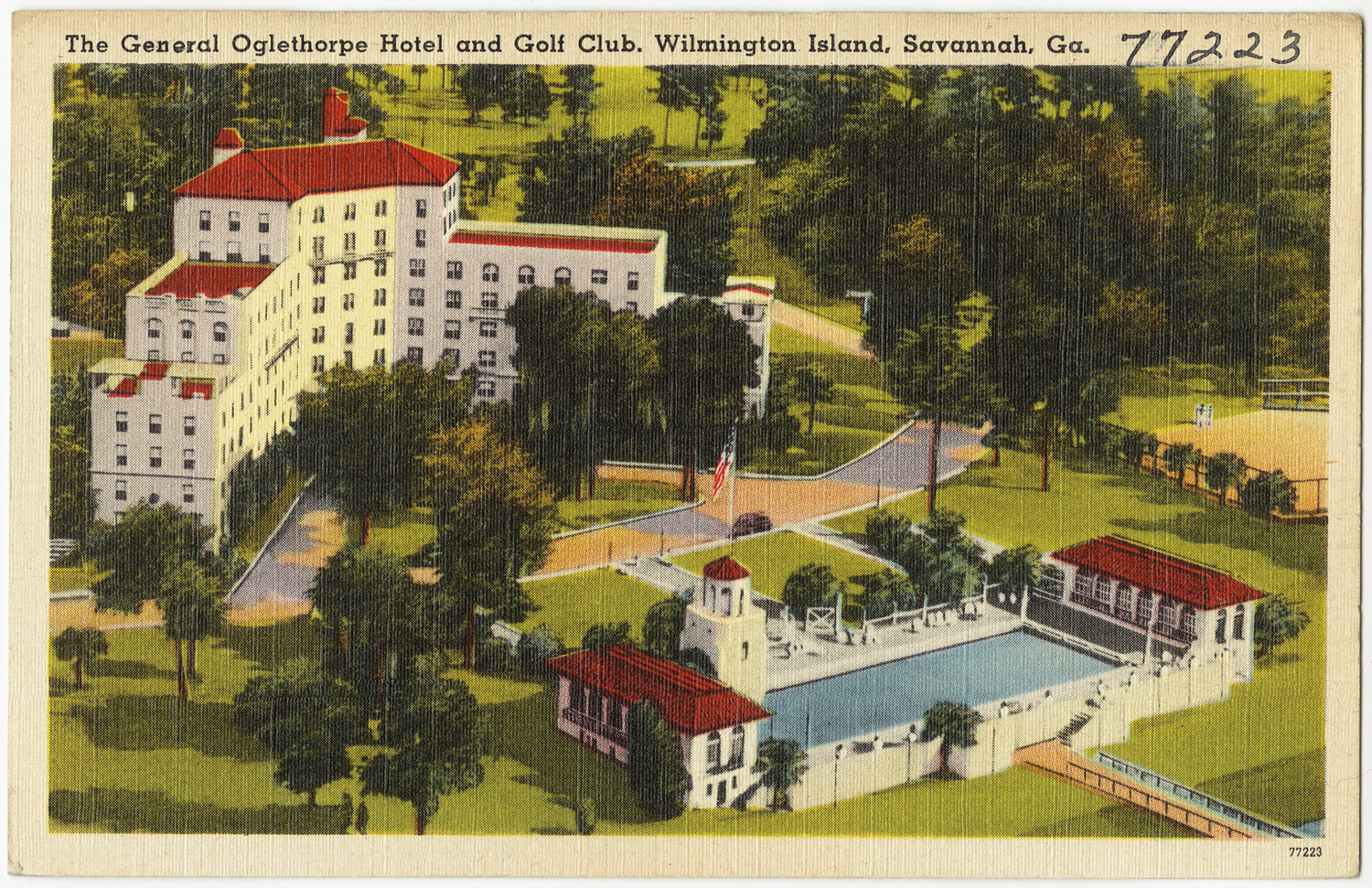
The former General Oglethorpe Hotel in Wilmington Island, Georgia

Walthour was born in 1874 in Opelika, Alabama, to Andrew Maxwell Walthour and Sarah Clayton. He was their second child, two years after Margaret Walthour Lippitt. He was the grandson of Major Henry D. Clayton, a noted Civil War veteran, and of Captain William L. Walthour.

He received his education in the public schools of Clayton, Alabama, before spending a year at the University of Alabama. He then attended the Agricultural & Mechanical College in Auburn, Alabama, before moving to his father's hometown of Savannah, Georgia, in the mid-1890s to begin working for the Florida Central and Peninsular Railroad. In 1900, he formed his own cotton-exporting business, later becoming the president of the Savannah Cotton Exchange. He was succeeded by David F. Griffin in 1928.

In 1906, he became vice president of the Espy Cotton Company. He later organized the Hutton Engineering & Contracting Company. Having become one of the largest landowners in the state of Georgia, he purchased Tybee Island with two other capitalists and became a co-owner of Hotel Tybee on said island. He also owned half of Wilmington Island. With the goal of creating a prized golf community, he donated the land on which the 500-room General Oglethorpe Hotel, designed by Henrik Wallin, was built in 1927.

In 1937, Walthour was listed as a Marshal of Georgia's Southern District of the United States district courts.

== Personal life ==
In 1901, Walthour married Helen Buckman, a native of Philadelphia, with whom he had four children: Sarah (1902), John (1904), Helen (1907) and Virginia.

Walthour was a 32nd-degree Freemason and was affiliated with Christ Church in Savannah.

== Death ==
Walthour died in 1940, aged 66. He was interred in Savannah's Bonaventure Cemetery. His widow survived him by seventeen years and was buried beside him.
