= Woodlane Plantation =

Historic house in Alabama, United States

- U.S. National Register of Historic Places
- Alabama Register of Landmarks and Heritage
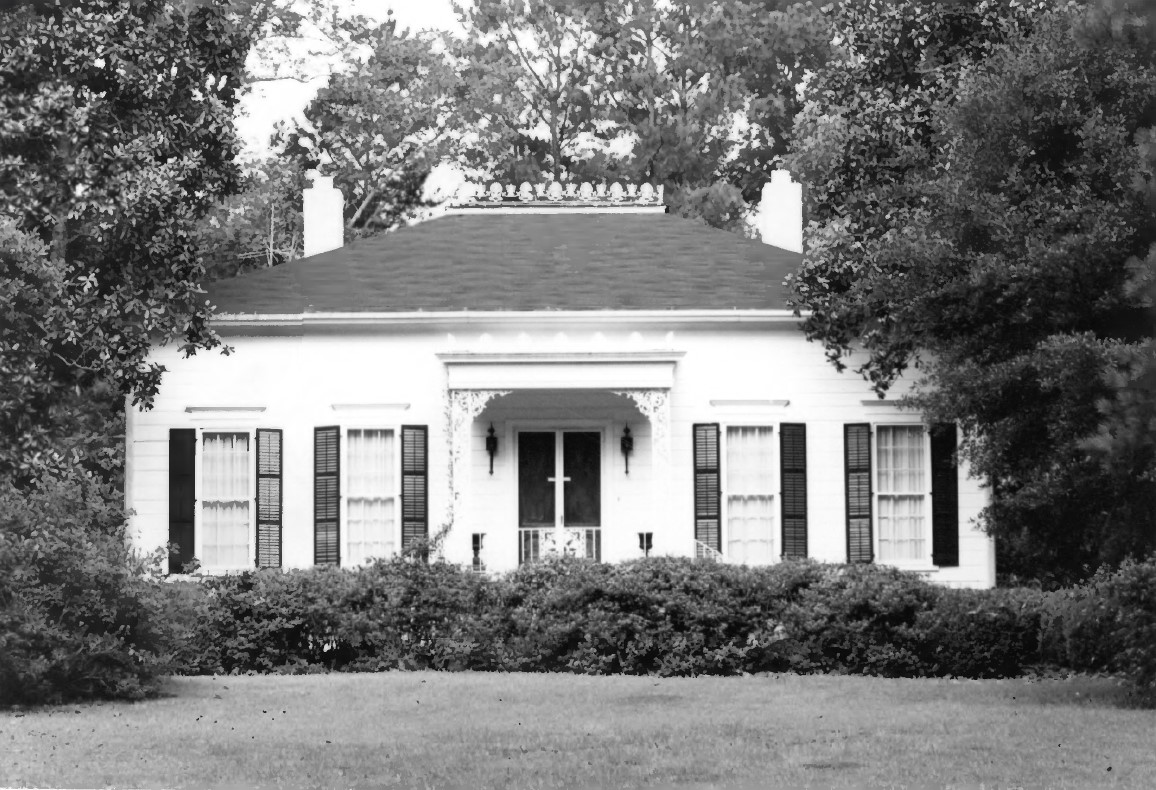
- Woodlane Mansion in 2001

- Location within Alabama Location within the United States
- Location: AL 431 S, Eufaula, Alabama
- Coordinates: 31°50′52.64″N 85°10′18.22″W
- Area: 124 acres (50 ha)
- Built: 1852
- Architectural style: Greek Revival
- NRHP reference No.: 06000183

Significant dates
- Added to NRHP: March 29, 2006
- Designated ARLH: December 15, 1989

The Woodlane Plantation is a historic plantation with a mansion in Eufaula, Alabama, U.S.. It was established as a cotton and tobacco plantation in the 1850s for John W. Raines. The mansion was designed in the Greek Revival architectural style, and its construction was completed in 1852. By the 1880s, it was the home of Reuben Kolb. It has been listed on the National Register of Historic Places since March 29, 2006.
