= Petty–Roberts–Beatty House =

Historic house in Alabama, United States

- U.S. National Register of Historic Places
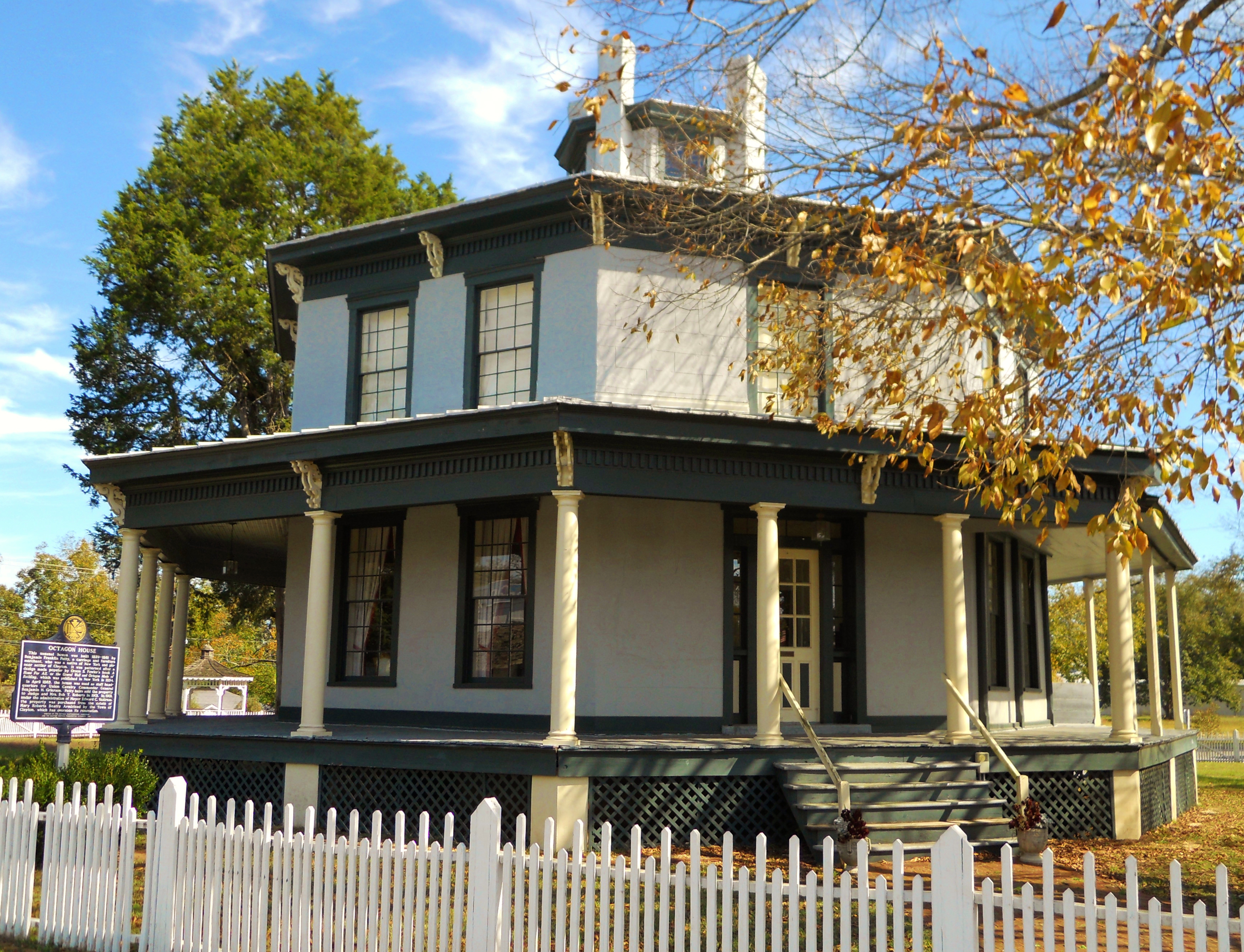
- The Octagon House in 2011

- Location within Alabama Location within the United States
- Location: N. Midway & M.L.K. Jr. Ave, Clayton, Alabama
- Coordinates: 31°52′43″N 85°26′58″W
- Built: 1861
- Architect: Petty, B.F.
- Architectural style: Octagon house
- NRHP reference No.: 74000400
- Added to NRHP: January 21, 1974

The Petty–Roberts–Beatty House, also known as the Octagon House, is an historic octagonal house in Clayton, Alabama, United States. The structure was one of only two antebellum octagonal houses built in Alabama and is the only one to survive.

This unusual house was built by Benjamin Franklin Petty starting in 1859 and completed in 1861. Petty was a carriage and furniture merchant who was a native of New York and pioneer settler of Clayton. The house was patterned after a design made popular by Orson Squire Fowler's book, A Home For All, or the Gravel Wall and Octagon Mode of Building which was published in 1854.

In April 1865, the house was used as staff headquarters for Union Cavalry Commander General Benjamin H. Grierson. Petty's heirs sold the property to Judge and Mrs. Bob T. Roberts in 1901. In 1981, under the administration of Mayor Edward C. Ventress, the property was purchased from the estate of Mary Roberts Beatty Armistead by the Town of Clayton which has overseen its renovation.

The house was added to the National Register of Historic Places on January 21, 1974.

== See also ==
- National Register of Historic Places listings in Barbour County, Alabama
