= Sheppard Cottage =

Historic house in Alabama, United States

- U.S. National Register of Historic Places
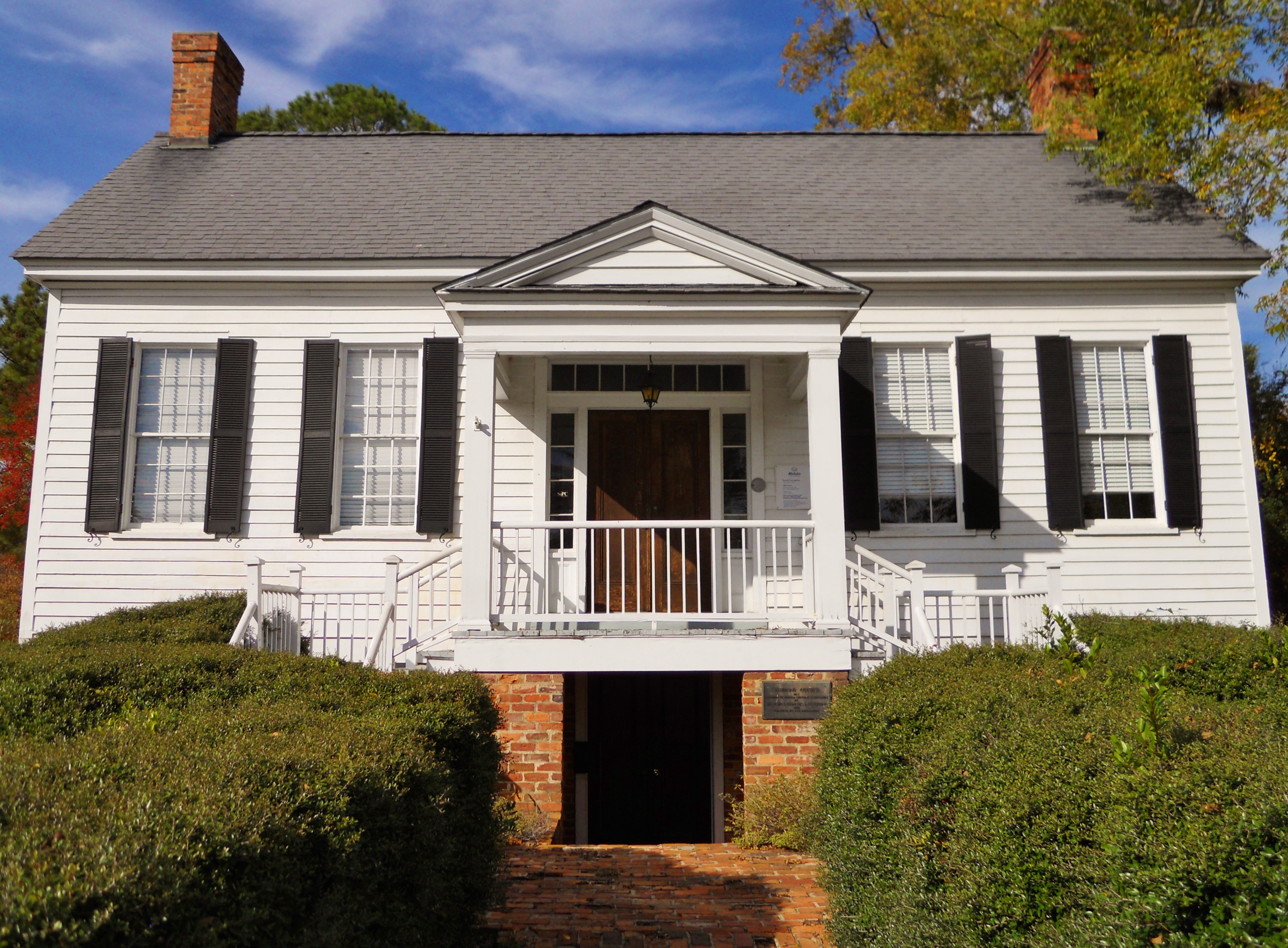
- Sheppard Cottage in 2011

- Location within Alabama Location within the United States
- Location: East Barbour Street, Eufaula, Alabama
- Coordinates: 31°53′28″N 85°8′20″W
- Area: 0 acres (0 ha)
- Built: 1837
- Architectural style: Southern Cape Cod Cottage
- NRHP reference No.: 71000096
- Added to NRHP: May 27, 1971

Sheppard Cottage is a historic house in Eufaula, Alabama, U.S.. It was built for Henry H. Field in 1837. It was later purchased by Mariah A. Snipes, who lived in the house until she deeded it to John DeWitt Snipes in 1858. In 1868, it was acquired Dr. Edmund Sheppard, a physician and a veteran of the Confederate States Army during the American Civil War of 1861–1865. It was later purchased by C. L. Lunsford, who eventually gave it to the Eufaula Heritage Association. It has been listed on the National Register of Historic Places since May 27, 1971.
