= Bray-Barron House =

Historic house in Alabama, United States

- U.S. National Register of Historic Places
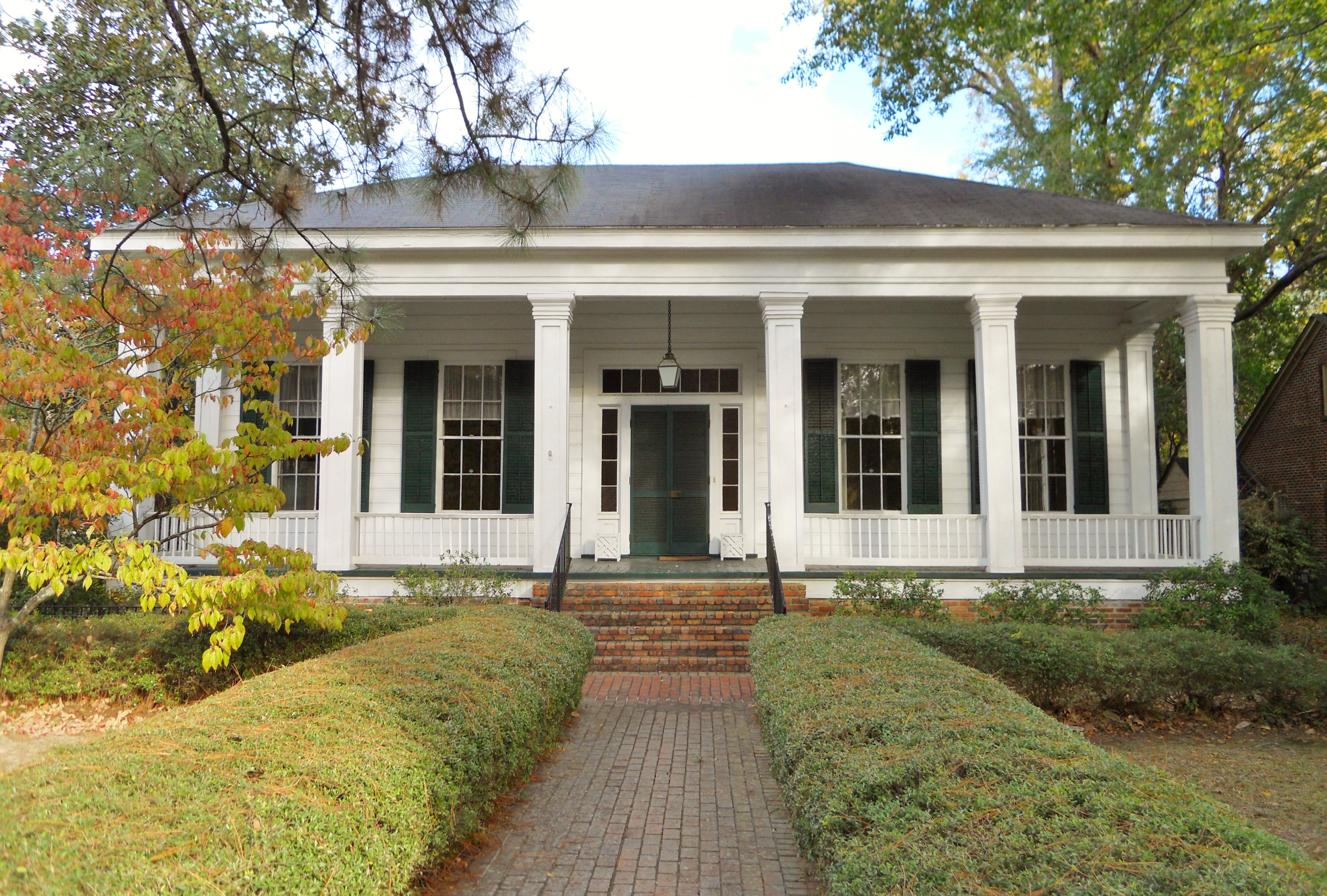
- The Bray-Barron House in 2011

- Location within Alabama Location within the United States
- Location: North Eufaula Avenue, Eufaula, Alabama
- Coordinates: 31°53′50″N 85°8′40″W
- Area: 9.9 acres (4.0 ha)
- Built: 1845
- Architectural style: Greek Revival
- NRHP reference No.: 71000093
- Added to NRHP: May 27, 1971

The Bray-Barron House is a historic house in Eufaula, Alabama, United States. It was built prior to 1850 for Nathan Bray, who went on to serve in the Confederate States Army during the American Civil War of 1861–1865 alongside his three brothers. The house remained in the family until 1963. It was purchased by N. G. Barron and his wife Ruby Hutton Barron in 1965. It has been listed on the National Register of Historic Places since May 27, 1971.

The house was built sometime before 1850 by former New Englander and later Confederate Army arms receipt manager Nathan Bray. The house was occupied by Bray family members until 1963, when the last surviving member, Katie Bray, died. The house was then donated to the Presbyterian Church of Eufaula, and, in 1964, was sold to A.M. Rudderman. Rudderman sold the property to Ralph Pyburn the same year and was sold again the following year to N.G. Barron and his wife, Ruby Hutton Barron.
