= Harry A. Hanbury =

American politician from New York State (1863–1940)

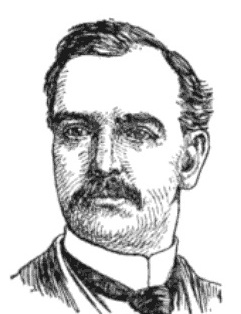

Member of the U.S. House of Representatives from New York's 4th district
- In office March 4, 1901 – March 3, 1903
- Preceded by: Bertram T. Clayton
- Succeeded by: Frank E. Wilson

Personal details
- Born: Harry Alfred Hanbury; January 1, 1863 Bristol, England
- Died: August 22, 1940 (aged 77) Methuen, Massachusetts, U.S.
- Resting place: Greenwood Cemetery, New York City, U.S.
- Party: Republican
- Profession: Politician

Harry Alfred Hanbury (January 1, 1863 – August 22, 1940) was a U.S. representative from New York.

Hanbury was born in Bristol, England and immigrated to the United States with his parents at an early age. He attended the public schools and graduated from the Boys' High School in New York City. He entered mercantile life and established ironworks. He served as delegate to State conventions in 1896, 1898, 1900, 1902, 1906, and 1914.

Hanbury was elected as a Republican to the 57th United States Congress(March 4, 1901 – March 3, 1903). United States shipping commissioner, port of New York, from March 1903 to November 1909. He established a foundry and machine works in Brooklyn, New York. He engaged in mechanical engineering and ship reconstruction in Brooklyn, New York. He died in Methuen, Massachusetts, on August 22, 1940. He was interred in Greenwood Cemetery, Brooklyn, New York.

U.S. House of Representatives
Preceded by Bertram Tracy Clayton	Member of the U.S. House of Representatives from New York's 4th congressional district 1901–1903	Succeeded by Frank E. Wilson
