= George W. Andrews =

American politician (1906–1971)

George William Andrews
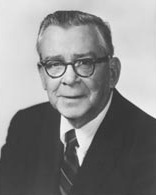

Member of the U.S. House of Representatives from Alabama
- In office March 14, 1944 – December 25, 1971
- Preceded by: Henry B. Steagall
- Succeeded by: Elizabeth B. Andrews
- Constituency: 3rd district (1944-1963); At-large (1963–1965); 3rd district (1965-1971)

Personal details
- Born: December 12, 1906 Clayton, Alabama, U.S.
- Died: December 25, 1971 (aged 65) Birmingham, Alabama, U.S.
- Spouse: Leslie Elizabeth Bullock (m. 1936)
- Children: 2
- Education: University of Alabama at Tuscaloosa
- Occupation: lawyer, politician, judge

George William Andrews (December 12, 1906 – December 25, 1971) was an American politician and a U.S. representative from Alabama, and the husband of Elizabeth B. Andrews.

Andrews is known for objecting to the Supreme Court decisions banning school segregation and school prayer by saying, "They put the Negroes in the schools and now they've driven God out."

== Biography ==
Andrews was born in Clayton, Alabama, son of George William and Addie Bell (King) Andrews. He attended the public schools, and graduated from the University of Alabama at Tuscaloosa in 1928. He was admitted to the bar in 1928 and commenced practice in Union Springs, Alabama. On November 25, 1936, he married Leslie Elizabeth Bullock.

== Career ==
He served as district attorney for the third judicial circuit of Alabama, from 1931 to 1943. During the Second World War, he served as a lieutenant (jg.) in the United States Naval Reserve from January 1943 until his election to Congress, at which time he was serving at Pearl Harbor, Hawaii.

Andrews was elected as a Democrat to the Seventy-eighth Congress to fill the vacancy caused by the death of Henry B. Steagall. He was reelected to the fourteen succeeding Congresses and served from March 14, 1944, until his death from complications following heart surgery in Birmingham, Alabama on December 25, 1971.

Andrews was a signatory to the 1956 Southern Manifesto that opposed the desegregation of public schools ordered by the Supreme Court in Brown v. Board of Education. Andrews voted against the Civil Rights Acts of 1957, the Civil Rights Acts of 1960, the Civil Rights Acts of 1964, and the Civil Rights Acts of 1968 as well as the 24th Amendment to the U.S. Constitution and the Voting Rights Act of 1965.

== Death and legacy ==
Andrews died in Birmingham, Alabama, on December 25, 1971, 13 days after turning 65. He is interred at Oak Hill Cemetery, Union Springs, Alabama. The George W. Andrews Lake and George W. Andrews Federal Building are named for him.

== See also ==
- List of members of the United States Congress who died in office (1950–1999)

U.S. House of Representatives
Preceded by Henry B. Steagall	Member of the U.S. House of Representatives from Alabama's 3rd congressional district 1944–1963	Succeeded by District inactive
Preceded by District inactive	Member of the U.S. House of Representatives from Alabama's at-large congressional district 1963–1965	Succeeded by District inactive
Preceded by District inactive	Member of the U.S. House of Representatives from Alabama's 3rd congressional district 1965–1971	Succeeded by Elizabeth B. Andrews
