= McDowell Lee =

American politician

Secretary of the Alabama Senate
- In office 1963–2011
- Preceded by: Jesse E. Speight
- Succeeded by: D. Patrick Harris

Member of the Alabama House of Representatives from Barbour County
- In office 1955–1963

Personal details
- Born: Charles McDowell Lee; February 12, 1925 Clayton, Alabama, U.S.
- Died: April 17, 2014 (aged 89) Auburn, Alabama, U.S.
- Party: Democratic
- Education: Troy University

Military service
- Allegiance: United States
- Branch/service: United States Navy
- Years of service: 1943–1945
- Battles/wars: World War II

Charles McDowell Lee (February 12, 1925 – April 17, 2014) was an American politician.

Born in Clayton, Alabama, Lee went to Auburn University. He then served in the United States Navy from 1943 to 1945 during World War II. He received his bachelor's degree from Troy University and worked as a Federal Bureau of Investigation agent. In 1948, Lee was elected Mayor of Clio, Alabama. From 1954 to 1962, Lee served in the Alabama House of Representatives as a Democrat. He then worked for Governor of Alabama George Wallace. Then, from 1963 until 2011, Lee served as Secretary of the Alabama State Senate. The Lieutenant Governor of Alabama Charles S. McDowell was his uncle. He died of cancer at his home in Auburn, Alabama.
