= Elizabeth B. Andrews =

American politician (1911–2002)

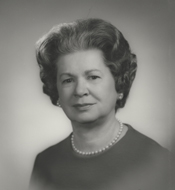
- Andrews in 1973

Member of the U.S. House of Representatives from Alabama's 3rd district
- In office April 4, 1972 – January 3, 1973
- Preceded by: George W. Andrews
- Succeeded by: William F. Nichols (Redistricting)

Personal details
- Born: Leslie Elizabeth Bullock; February 12, 1911 Geneva, Alabama, U.S.
- Died: December 2, 2002 (aged 91) Birmingham, Alabama, U.S.
- Party: Democratic
- Spouse: George W. Andrews (m. 1936; died 1971)
- Children: 2
- Education: University of Montevallo
- Profession: School teacher

Leslie Elizabeth Bullock Andrews (February 12, 1911 – December 2, 2002) was an American politician, who was the first woman to represent Alabama in the United States House of Representatives. She was the wife of congressman George William Andrews, and was elected to his seat after his death.

== Biography ==
Born Leslie Elizabeth Bullock in Geneva, Alabama, to Charles Gillespie Bullock and Janie Aycock, Andrews attended Geneva public schools. She earned a B.S. in home economics from Montevallo College (now the University of Montevallo), Montevallo, Alabama, in 1932. She went on to become a high school teacher at Livingston, Alabama. She later took a teaching job in Union Springs for the better pay during the Depression. This is where she met her husband, George William Andrews. They married on November 25, 1936, and had two children, Jane and George, Jr. The marriage lasted more than 35 years until his death of complications from heart surgery on December 25, 1971.

== Career ==
When her husband first ran for the 78th Congress, she was heavily involved with his campaign. He was reelected to 14 succeeding Congresses and the couple relocated to Washington, D.C., where Andrews became involved in the Congressional Club and served as vice president in 1971.

After her husband's death in 1971, she was greatly encouraged by Lera Thomas and other friends to run for George's office as she could carry on his legacy. Andrews announced her candidacy on January 1, 1972, and received the endorsement of Alabama Governor George Wallace. Running unopposed, she was elected as a Democrat by special election to the Ninety-second Congress to fill the vacancy caused by the death of her husband, United States Representative George W. Andrews. She served the remainder of that Congress from April 4, 1972, to January 3, 1973. She was not a candidate for reelection to the Ninety-third Congress in 1972. She remained the only woman elected to represent Alabama in either House of Congress until the elections of Representatives Martha Roby and Terri Sewell in 2010.

During her term on the 92nd Congress, she was on the Committee on Post Office and Civil Service where she introduced amendments to protect medical and Social Security benefits. She also worked to find funding for Birmingham research centers researching cancer and heart disease. She supported the Nixon administration's plan for withdrawing U.S. troops from Vietnam. Andrews also worked to sponsor legislation to designate Tuskegee University as a National Historic Site.

She left Congress in January 1973 and she moved to Union Springs where she was active in civic affairs.

== Death ==
Andrews died on December 2, 2002, at the age of 91 in Birmingham, Alabama. She is interred at Oak Hill Cemetery, Union Springs, Alabama.

== See also ==
- Women in the United States House of Representatives

U.S. House of Representatives
Preceded by George W. Andrews	Member of the U.S. House of Representatives from Alabama's 3rd congressional district April 4, 1972 – January 3, 1973	Succeeded by William F. Nichols
