= Grace Episcopal Church (Clayton, Alabama) =

Historic church in Alabama, United States

- U.S. National Register of Historic Places
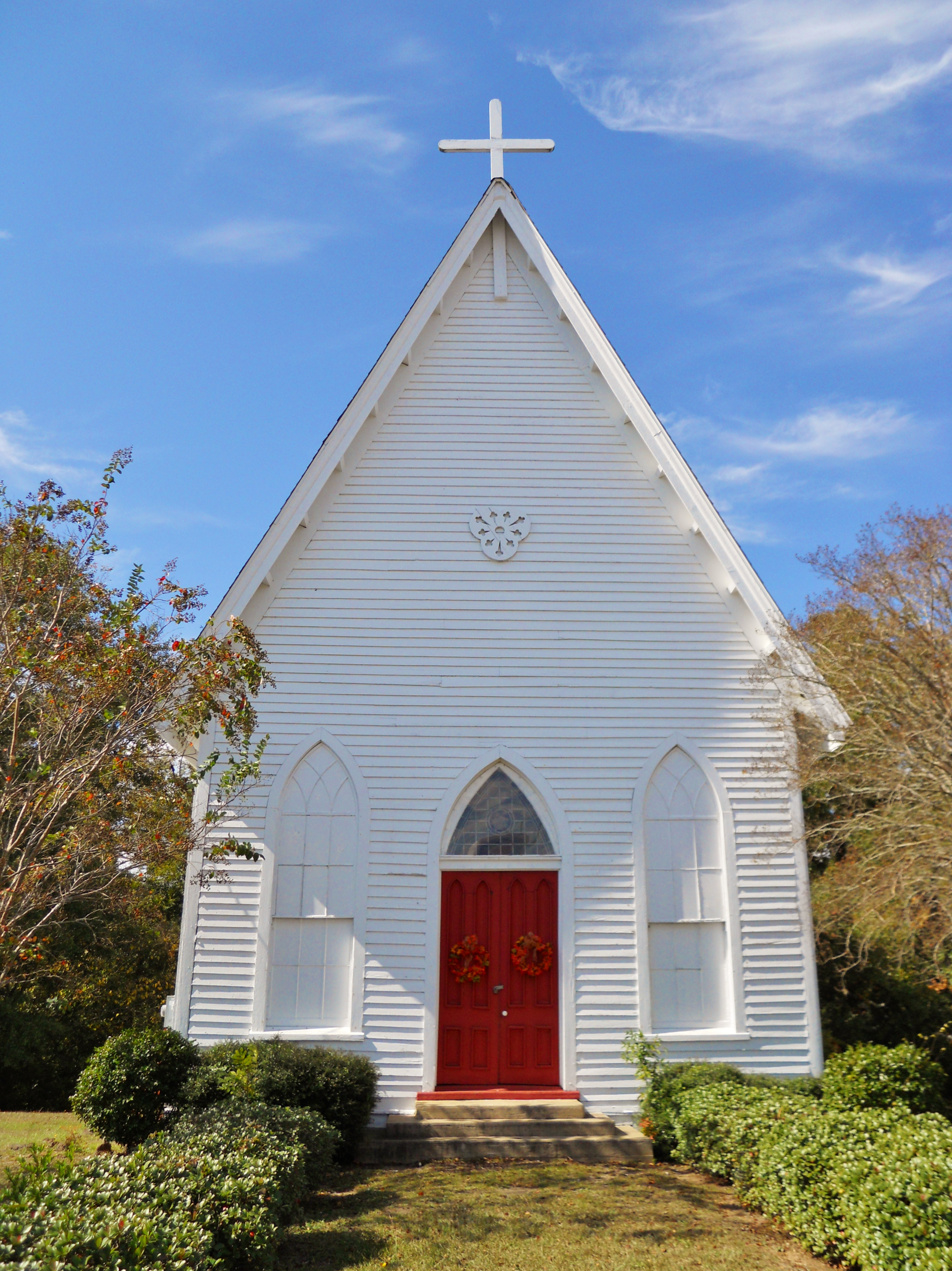

- Location within Alabama Location within the United States
- Location: Louisville St. S of Courthouse Sq., Clayton, Alabama
- Coordinates: 31°52′38″N 85°27′0″W
- Architectural style: Gothic Revival
- NRHP reference No.: 95001116
- Added to NRHP: September 22, 1995

Grace Episcopal Church is a historic church in Clayton, Alabama, United States. It was placed on the National Register of Historic Places on September 22, 1995.

== History ==
This church had its origins in a mission station established by the Reverend J. L. Gay in 1844.

On May 10, 1872, the mission was formally accepted in the Diocese of Alabama as Grace Church. Construction of a church building began in 1875 on a lot owned by General Henry DeLamar Clayton and his wife Victoria. The Gothic Revival style building was completed on February 26, 1876 at which time the lot was deeded by the Claytons to the Protestant Episcopal Church of the State of Alabama. Bishop Richard J. Wilmer formally consecrated the church on November 14, 1876.

The mission and church were served by Thomas J. Bland, DeBerniere Waddell, and E. W. Spalding as well as other clergy.

== Architecture ==
The church sits just south of the courthouse square in Clayton. It is a single-story building with a steeply pitched gable roof, with simple clapboard siding painted white. The three-bay façade has the double-leaf entry door topped with a gothic arched, stained glass transom window. Flanking the door are six-over-six windows topped with similar arched transoms. The interior of the sanctuary contains more gothic elements, including the altar chairs and lectern, and a large arch framing the chancel area.
