= Clayton, Alabama =

City in and county seat of Barbour County, Alabama

- Town
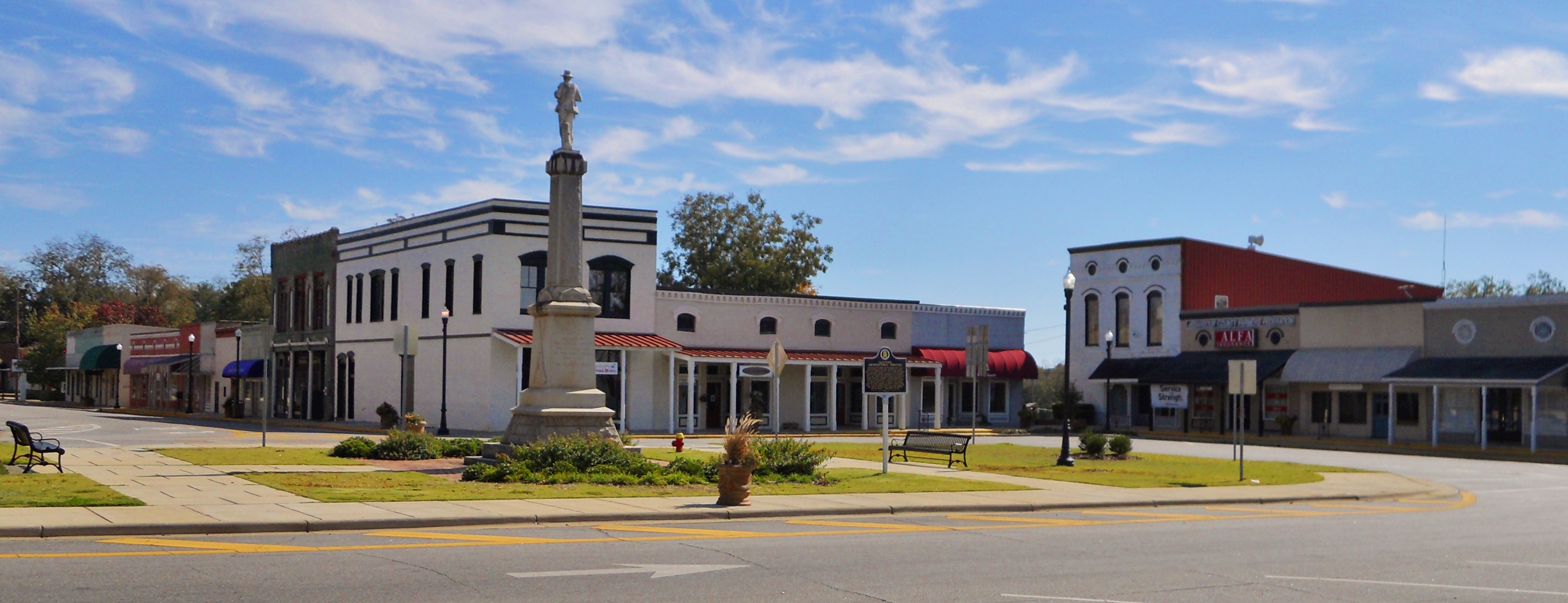
- Courthouse Square and Confederate Monument in Clayton

- Flag

- Location of Clayton in Barbour County, Alabama.
- Coordinates: 31°52′44″N 85°28′32″W
- Country: United States
- State: Alabama
- County: Barbour

Area
  - Total: 6.78 sq mi (17.55 km^{2})
  - Land: 6.78 sq mi (17.55 km^{2})
  - Water: 0 sq mi (0.00 km^{2})
- Elevation: 574 ft (175 m)

Population (2020)
  - Total: 2,265
  - Density: 334.3/sq mi (129.06/km^{2})
- Time zone: UTC-6 (Central (CST))
  - Summer (DST): UTC-5 (CDT)
- ZIP code: 36016
- Area code: 334
- FIPS code: 01-15376
- GNIS feature ID: 2406274
- Website: https://claytonalabama.com/

Clayton is a town in and the county seat of Barbour County, Alabama, United States. As of the 2020 census, Clayton had a population of 2,265.

== History ==
Clayton has been the county seat since 1834, two years after the creation of Barbour County. Clayton is located geographically in the center of the county. The town was located at the headwaters of the Pea and Choctawhatchee rivers on the historic road from Hobdy's Bridge over the Pea River to Eufaula on the Chattahoochee River. By 1818, there were a few settlers in the area around Clayton, but settlement began in earnest around 1823. The town was named for Augustin S. Clayton, a Georgia jurist and congressman. Clayton became the county seat of Barbour County in 1833 and was laid out on a central courthouse square plan. The first Circuit Court was held in Clayton on September 23, 1833. The Clayton post office was established in September 1835 with John F. Keener as postmaster. Clayton, with a population of 200, was incorporated on December 21, 1841, by the Alabama Legislature. Its first mayor, after incorporation, was John Jackson.

Clayton has a rich heritage with four properties listed on the National Register of Historic Places. It is also known for its Whiskey Bottle Tombstone, which was featured in Ripley's Believe It or Not!.

Governor George Wallace was born in nearby Clio and began his legal and political career in Clayton. In March 1956, Wallace attended at the Clayton football stadium the first public meeting of the Barbour County White Citizens' Council, with an estimated 4,500 persons attending the white supremacist rally, "the largest rally in the history of the county seat."

== Geography ==
According to the U.S. Census Bureau, the town has a total area of 6.7 square miles (17.3 km^{2}), all land.

=== Climate ===
The climate in this area is characterized by hot, humid summers and generally mild to cool winters. According to the Köppen Climate Classification system, Clayton has a humid subtropical climate, abbreviated "Cfa" on climate maps.

Climate data for Clayton, Alabama, 1991–2020 normals, extremes 1956–present
Month	Jan	Feb	Mar	Apr	May	Jun	Jul	Aug	Sep	Oct	Nov	Dec	Year
Record high °F (°C)	82 (28)	86 (30)	88 (31)	94 (34)	98 (37)	102 (39)	104 (40)	105 (41)	102 (39)	99 (37)	92 (33)	84 (29)	105 (41)
Mean maximum °F (°C)	74.0 (23.3)	77.6 (25.3)	83.0 (28.3)	86.2 (30.1)	92.7 (33.7)	95.4 (35.2)	97.3 (36.3)	97.0 (36.1)	94.3 (34.6)	88.3 (31.3)	81.9 (27.7)	75.8 (24.3)	98.3 (36.8)
Mean daily maximum °F (°C)	58.3 (14.6)	62.5 (16.9)	69.8 (21.0)	76.5 (24.7)	84.0 (28.9)	88.8 (31.6)	91.3 (32.9)	90.4 (32.4)	86.1 (30.1)	77.9 (25.5)	68.3 (20.2)	60.3 (15.7)	76.2 (24.5)
Daily mean °F (°C)	47.7 (8.7)	51.3 (10.7)	57.9 (14.4)	64.4 (18.0)	72.4 (22.4)	78.8 (26.0)	81.3 (27.4)	80.7 (27.1)	76.1 (24.5)	66.7 (19.3)	56.5 (13.6)	50.1 (10.1)	65.3 (18.5)
Mean daily minimum °F (°C)	37.0 (2.8)	40.1 (4.5)	46.0 (7.8)	52.4 (11.3)	60.9 (16.1)	68.8 (20.4)	71.4 (21.9)	71.1 (21.7)	66.1 (18.9)	55.4 (13.0)	44.6 (7.0)	39.8 (4.3)	54.5 (12.5)
Mean minimum °F (°C)	18.6 (−7.4)	23.4 (−4.8)	27.7 (−2.4)	36.6 (2.6)	44.9 (7.2)	59.0 (15.0)	65.2 (18.4)	62.7 (17.1)	52.5 (11.4)	37.7 (3.2)	27.2 (−2.7)	23.5 (−4.7)	16.7 (−8.5)
Record low °F (°C)	−6 (−21)	10 (−12)	13 (−11)	27 (−3)	32 (0)	48 (9)	57 (14)	56 (13)	42 (6)	28 (−2)	17 (−8)	−5 (−21)	−6 (−21)
Average precipitation inches (mm)	4.55 (116)	5.23 (133)	5.21 (132)	4.98 (126)	3.70 (94)	4.94 (125)	6.03 (153)	4.54 (115)	3.68 (93)	3.33 (85)	3.83 (97)	5.62 (143)	55.64 (1,412)
Average snowfall inches (cm)	0.2 (0.51)	0.0 (0.0)	0.0 (0.0)	0.0 (0.0)	0.0 (0.0)	0.0 (0.0)	0.0 (0.0)	0.0 (0.0)	0.0 (0.0)	0.0 (0.0)	0.0 (0.0)	0.3 (0.76)	0.5 (1.27)
Average precipitation days (≥ 0.01 in)	7.8	8.4	7.2	6.5	5.9	9.9	10.0	9.0	6.2	4.3	5.4	7.8	88.4
Average snowy days (≥ 0.1 in)	0.4	0.1	0.0	0.0	0.0	0.0	0.0	0.0	0.0	0.0	0.0	0.1	0.6
Source 1: NOAA
Source 2: National Weather Service

== Demographics ==
Historical population
Census	Pop.	Note	%±
1850	400		—
1880	761		—
1890	997		31.0%
1900	998		0.1%
1910	1,130		13.2%
1920	989		−12.5%
1930	1,717		73.6%
1940	1,813		5.6%
1950	1,583		−12.7%
1960	1,313		−17.1%
1970	1,626		23.8%
1980	1,589		−2.3%
1990	1,564		−1.6%
2000	1,475		−5.7%
2010	3,008		103.9%
2020	2,265		−24.7%
U.S. Decennial Census; 2013 Estimate

=== Racial and ethnic composition ===
Clayton town, Alabama – Racial and ethnic composition Note: the US Census treats Hispanic/Latino as an ethnic category. This table excludes Latinos from the racial categories and assigns them to a separate category. Hispanics/Latinos may be of any race. Race and ethnicity was not surveyed for populations under 2,500 in the 1980 census and under 1,000 in 1990 census.
Race / Ethnicity (NH = Non-Hispanic)	Pop 1990	Pop 2000	Pop 2010	Pop 2020	% 1990	% 2000	% 2010	% 2020
White alone (NH)	635	513	1,068	779	40.60%	34.78%	35.51%	34.39%
Black or African American alone (NH)	924	930	1,913	1,413	59.08%	63.05%	63.60%	62.38%
Native American or Alaska Native alone (NH)	0	3	0	0	0.00%	0.20%	0.00%	0.00%
Asian alone (NH)	0	0	1	2	0.00%	0.00%	0.03%	0.09%
Native Hawaiian or Pacific Islander alone (NH)	x	0	0	0	x	0.00%	0.00%	0.00%
Other race alone (NH)	0	0	0	2	0.00%	0.00%	0.00%	0.09%
Mixed race or Multiracial (NH)	x	9	7	33	x	0.61%	0.23%	1.46%
Hispanic or Latino (any race)	5	20	19	36	0.32%	1.36%	0.63%	1.59%
Total	1,564	1,475	3,008	2,265	100.00%	100.00%	100.00%	100.00%

=== 2020 census ===
As of the 2020 census, Clayton had a population of 2,265. The median age was 40.1 years. 10.2% of residents were under the age of 18 and 12.7% of residents were 65 years of age or older. For every 100 females there were 283.2 males, and for every 100 females age 18 and over there were 337.6 males.

0.0% of residents lived in urban areas, while 100.0% lived in rural areas.

There were 471 households in Clayton, of which 25.5% had children under the age of 18 living in them. Of all households, 28.2% were married-couple households, 21.7% were households with a male householder and no spouse or partner present, and 45.6% were households with a female householder and no spouse or partner present. About 35.2% of all households were made up of individuals and 15.7% had someone living alone who was 65 years of age or older.

There were 589 housing units, of which 20.0% were vacant. The homeowner vacancy rate was 1.1% and the rental vacancy rate was 12.8%.

=== 2010 census ===
As of the census of 2010, there were 3,008 people, 552 households, and 349 families residing in the town. The population density was 450 inhabitants per square mile (170/km^{2}). There were 649 housing units at an average density of 96.8 per square mile (37.4/km^{2}). The racial makeup of the town was 63.8% Black or African American, 35.8% White, 0.0% Native American, 0.0% from other races, and 0.3% from two or more races. .6% of the population were Hispanic or Latino of any race.

There were 552 households, out of which 28.8% had children under the age of 18 living with them, 31.2% were married couples living together, 27.7% had a female householder with no husband present, and 36.8% were non-families. 33.5% of all households were made up of individuals, and 13.1% had someone living alone who was 65 years of age or older. The average household size was 2.33 and the average family size was 2.95.

In the town, the population was spread out, with 11.9% under the age of 18, 11.7% from 18 to 24, 46.1% from 25 to 44, 23.3% from 45 to 64, and 7.1% who were 65 years of age or older. The median age was 34.8 years. For every 100 females, there were 317.2 males. For every 100 females age 18 and over, there were 112.5 males.

The median income for a household in the town was $23,629, and the median income for a family was $17,778. Males had a median income of $33,750 versus $26,964 for females. The per capita income for the town was $11,288. About 27.4% of families and 29.3% of the population were below the poverty line, including 30.6% of those under age 18 and 26.3% of those age 65 or over.

== Education ==
Clayton is served by Barbour County School District. Barbour County High School and Barbour County Primary School are located in the town of Clayton.

== Notable people ==
- Mildred Adair (1895–1943), composer, pianist and teacher
- George W. Andrews, U.S. House of Representatives
- Billy Beasley, Alabama politician
- Jere Beasley (born 1935), two-term Lieutenant Governor of Alabama and acting Governor of Alabama
- Thomas J. Clarke (Alabama politician), a farmer, state legislator and constable during the late 19th century
- Bertram Tracy Clayton (1862–1918), U.S. House of Representative for New York and U.S. Army officer killed in World War I
- Henry DeLamar Clayton, Sr. (1827–1889), major general in the Confederate army
- Henry De Lamar Clayton, Jr. (1857–1929), U.S. House of Representatives, author of the Clayton Antitrust Act
- Travis Grant (born 1950), college and professional basketball player
- Clarence Clement "Shovel" Hodge (1893–1967), Major League Baseball pitcher
- Katherine Jackson, matriarch of the Jackson family
- McDowell Lee, Member of the Alabama House of Representatives
- Albert J. Lingo, director of the Alabama Department of Public Safety
- Margaret Walthour Lippitt (1872–1964), artist
- Ann Lowe (1899–1981), designer of wedding dress for Jacqueline Bouvier Kennedy Onassis
- George Wallace (1919–1998), Governor of Alabama and U.S. presidential candidate
- George C. Wallace, Jr. (born 1951), Alabama State Treasurer
- Lurleen Wallace (1926–1968), Governor of Alabama
- Ariosto A. Wiley, U.S. Representative from 1901 to 1908
- Jeremiah Norman Williams, U.S. Congressman for the 2nd and 3rd Districts of Alabama

== Gallery ==
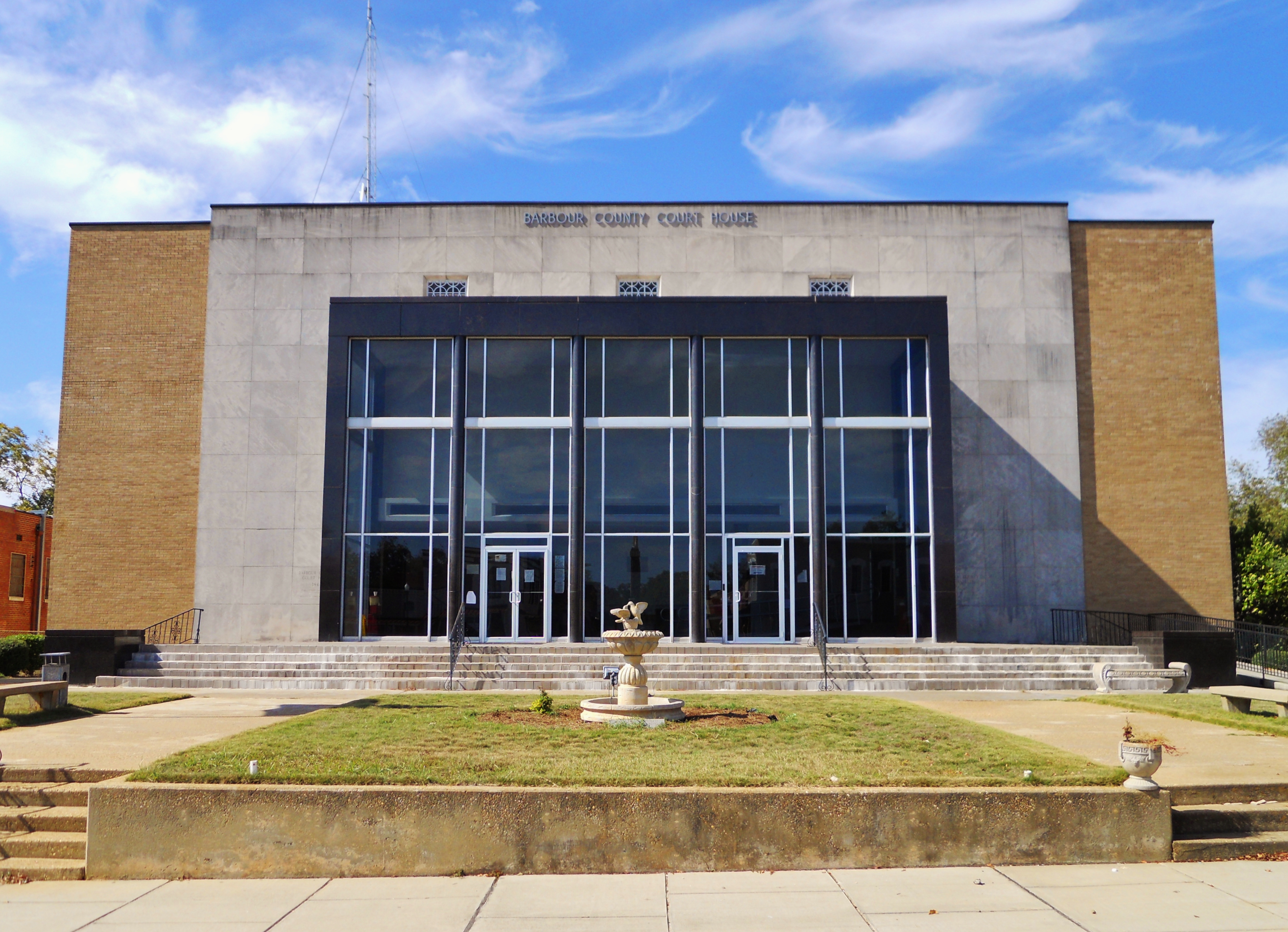
The Barbour County Courthouse is located in Clayton.

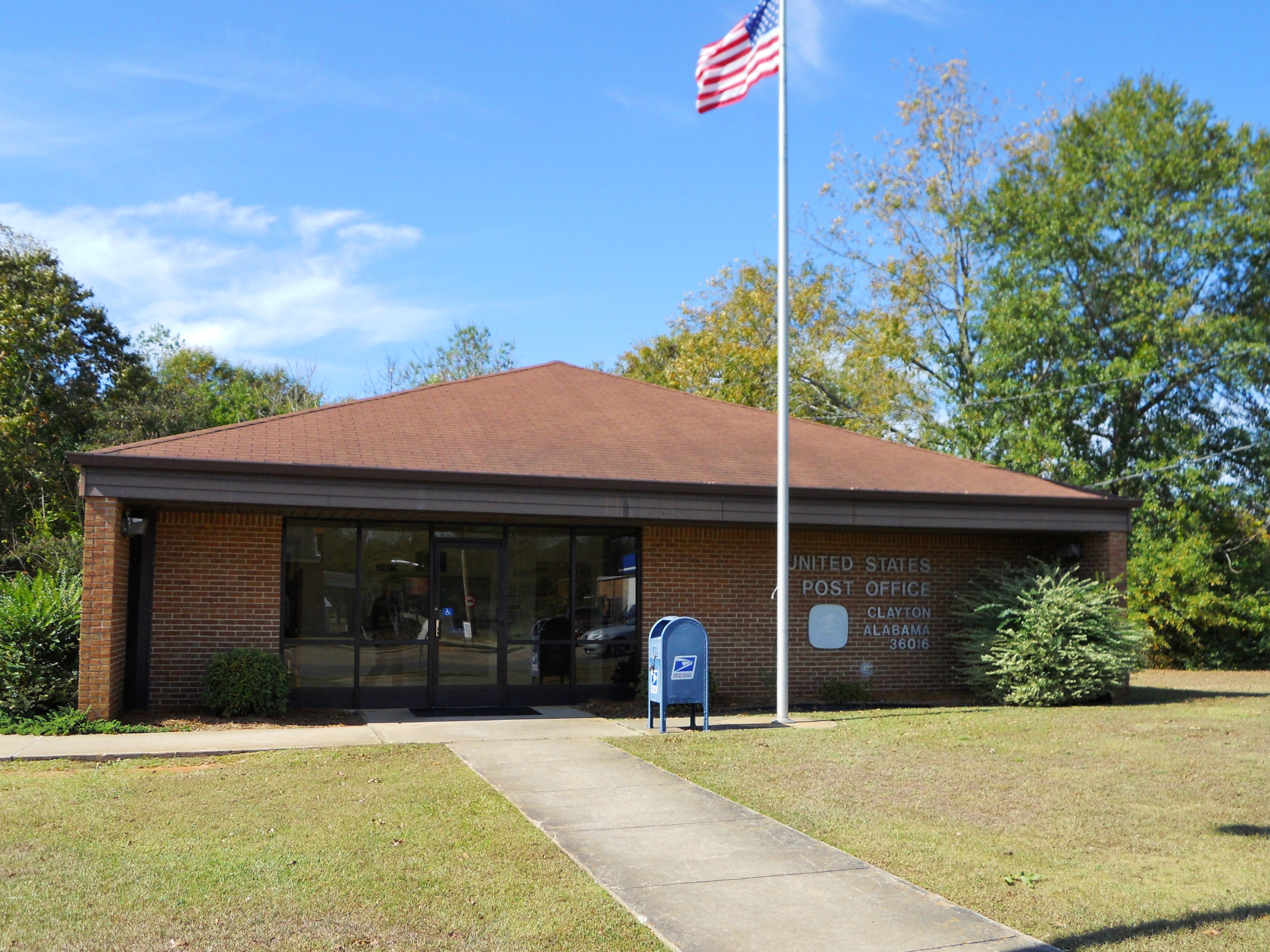
The post office in Clayton (ZIP code: 36016)

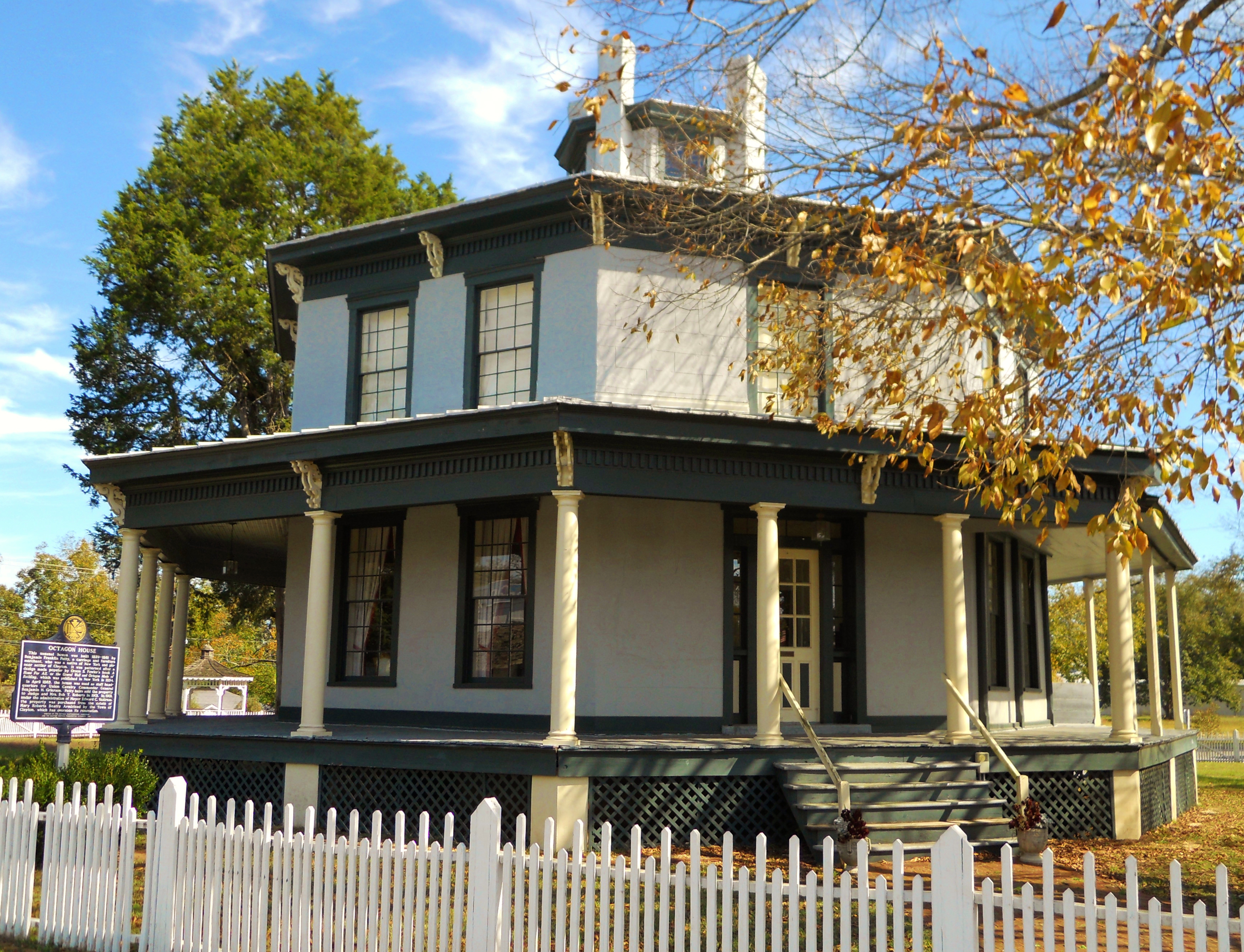
The Petty-Roberts-Beatty House is an octagon house built in 1861 by Benjamin Franklin Petty. It is one of only two antebellum octagonal houses built in Alabama and the only one to survive. It was added to the National Register of Historic Places on January 21, 1974.

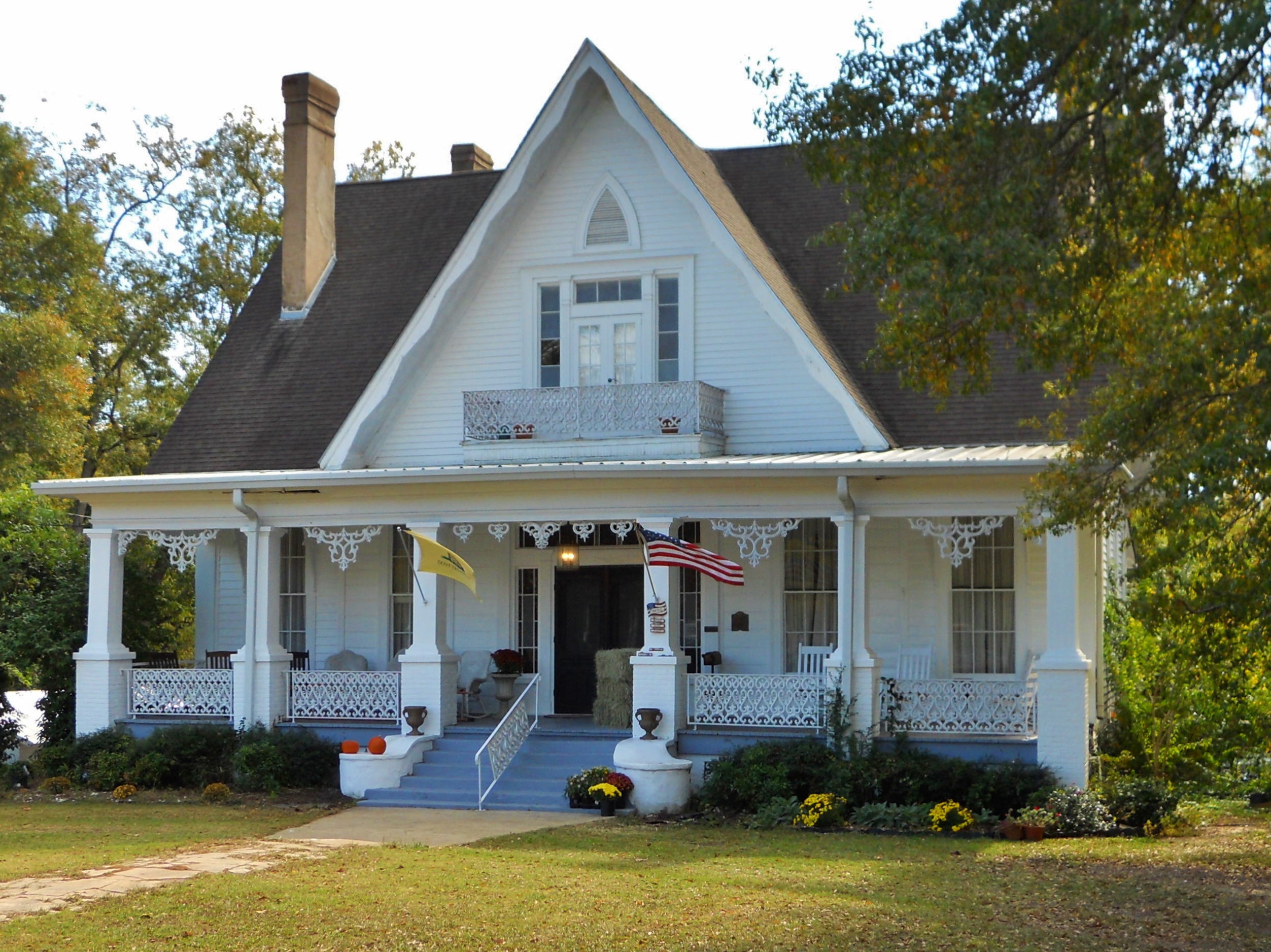
The Miller-Martin Town House was built in 1859 by John H. Miller. This Gothic Revival townhouse is noteworthy for its hand-painted murals on the entrance hall ceiling which depict the four seasons as well as other designs on the parlor and dining hall ceilings. It was added to the National Register of Historic Places on December 16, 1974.

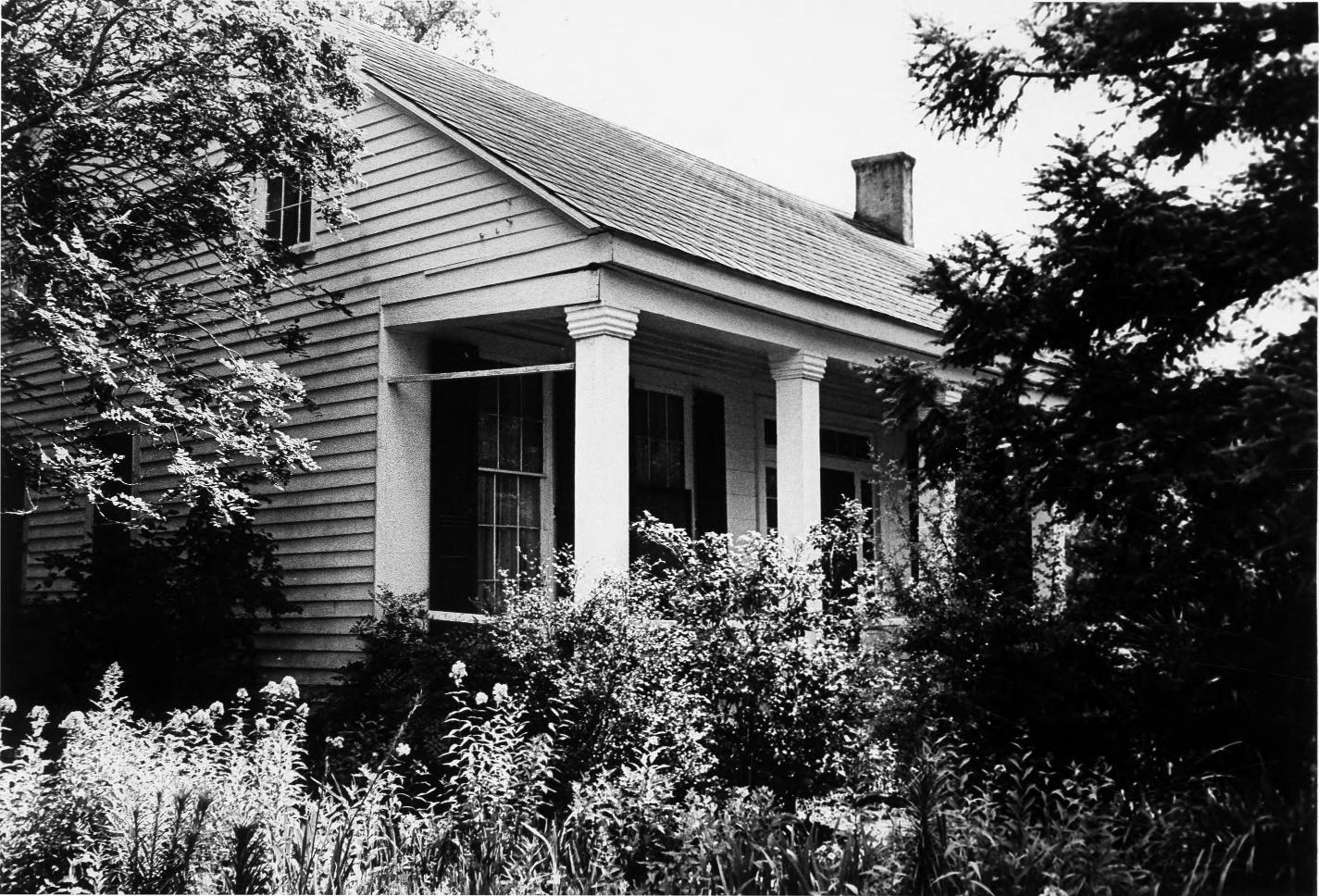
The Henry D. Clayton House was built around 1850 and served as the home of Confederate General Henry D. Clayton, Sr., former President of the University of Alabama, as well as his son Henry D. Clayton, Jr., a legislator, a judge and the author of the Clayton Antitrust Act of 1914. It was added to the National Register of Historic Places on December 8, 1976.

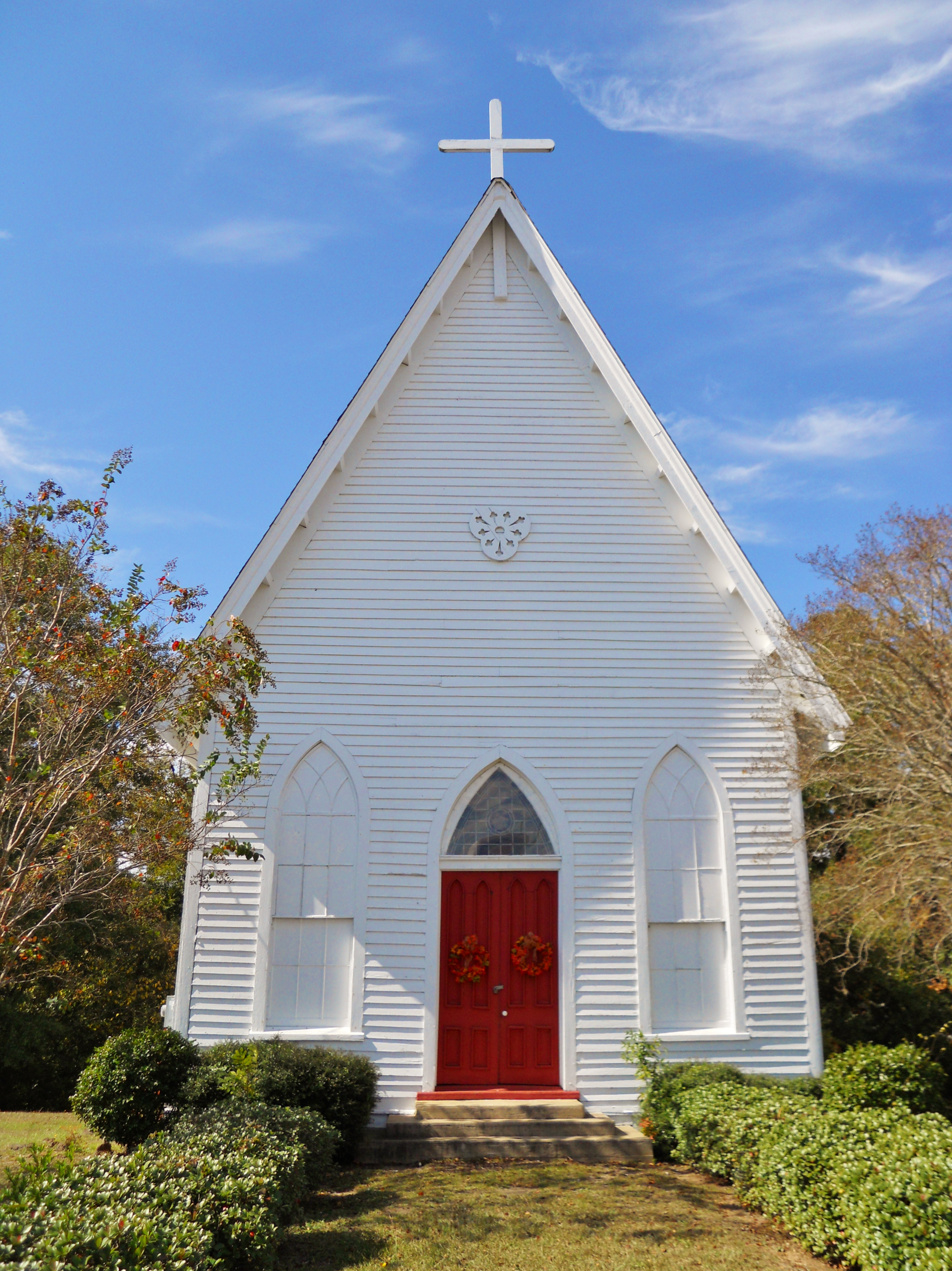
The Grace Episcopal Church is a Gothic Revival-style building. It was completed on February 26, 1876, at which time the property was deeded by the Clayton family to the Protestant Episcopal Church of the State of Alabama. Bishop Richard J. Wilmer formally consecrated the church on November 14, 1876. It was added to the National Register of Historic Places on September 22, 1995.
