= McNab Bank Building =

- U.S. National Register of Historic Places
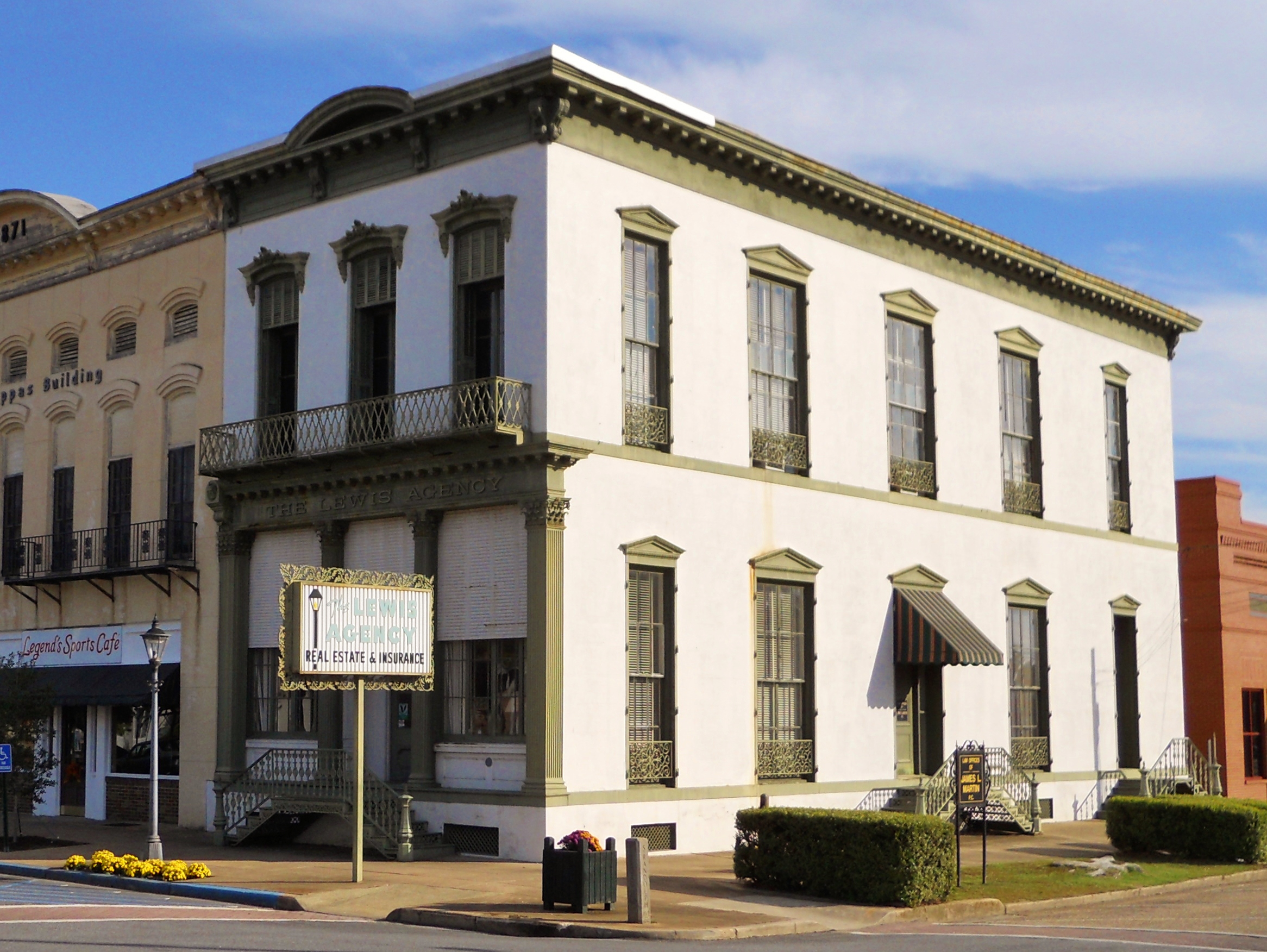
- The McNab Bank Building in 2011

- Location within Alabama Location within the United States
- Location: Broad Street, Eufaula, Alabama
- Coordinates: 31°53′33″N 85°8′37″W
- Area: 0.4 acres (0.16 ha)
- Built: 1855
- Architectural style: No. Italian Renaissance Rvl.
- NRHP reference No.: 71000095
- Added to NRHP: June 24, 1971

The McNab Bank Building is a historic building in Eufaula, Alabama, U.S.. It was built in the 1850s for John McNab, a Scottish-born banker. It has been listed on the National Register of Historic Places since June 24, 1971.
