= Wellborn (Eufaula, Alabama) =

Historic house in Alabama, United States

- U.S. National Register of Historic Places
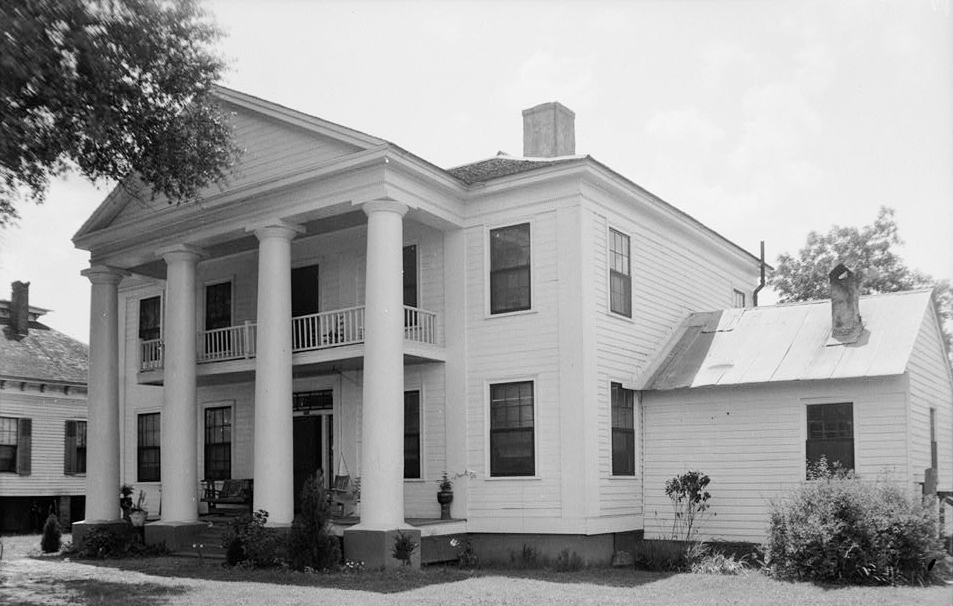
- Wellborn in 2011

- Location within Alabama Location within the United States
- Location: 630 E. Broad St., Eufaula, Alabama
- Coordinates: 31°53′37″N 85°8′23″W
- Area: 0.1 acres (0.040 ha)
- Built: 1837
- Architect: George Whipple
- Architectural style: Greek Revival
- NRHP reference No.: 71000097
- Added to NRHP: July 14, 1971

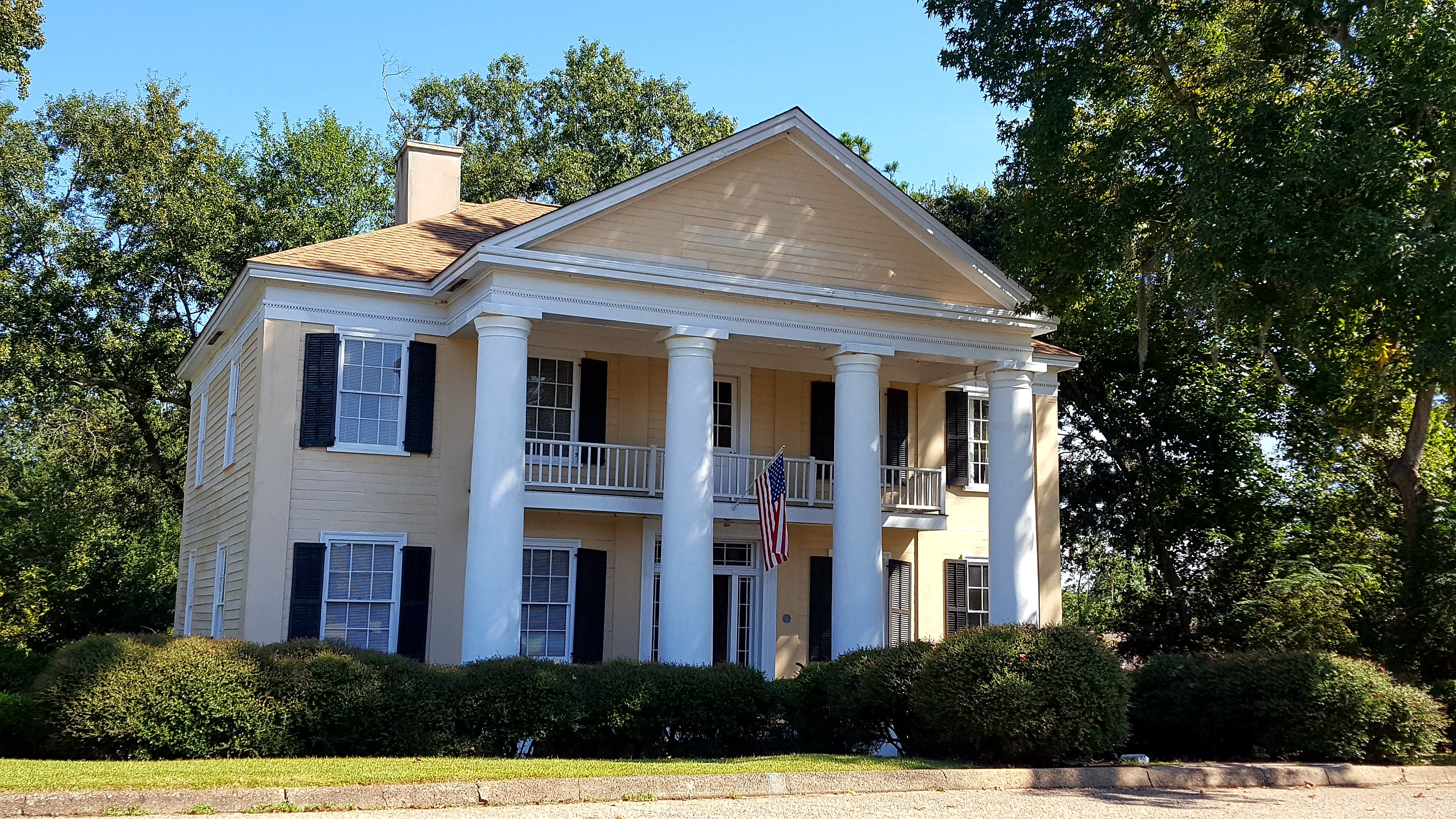
Wellborn in 2018

Wellborn, also known as the Dr. Levi Thomas House, is a Greek Revival style residence in Eufaula, Alabama, United States, built for Dr. Thomas Levi Wellborn. The house was built in 1837 on lands that had once belonged to the Creek Confederacy. Wellborn had been wounded in a battle during the Creek War of 1836, and died of the wound in 1841. His family continued to live at the residence.

The house is a five-bay two-story frame structure with a large four-columned Doric portico across the middle three bays. The columns are plastered brick. The plan on both levels features a center hall with two rooms on either side.

The house was moved from 134 Livingston Avenue to 630 Broad Street.

Wellborn was placed on the National Register of Historic Places on July 14, 1971.
