= Henry D. Clayton Jr. =

American judge (1857–1929)

Henry D. Clayton
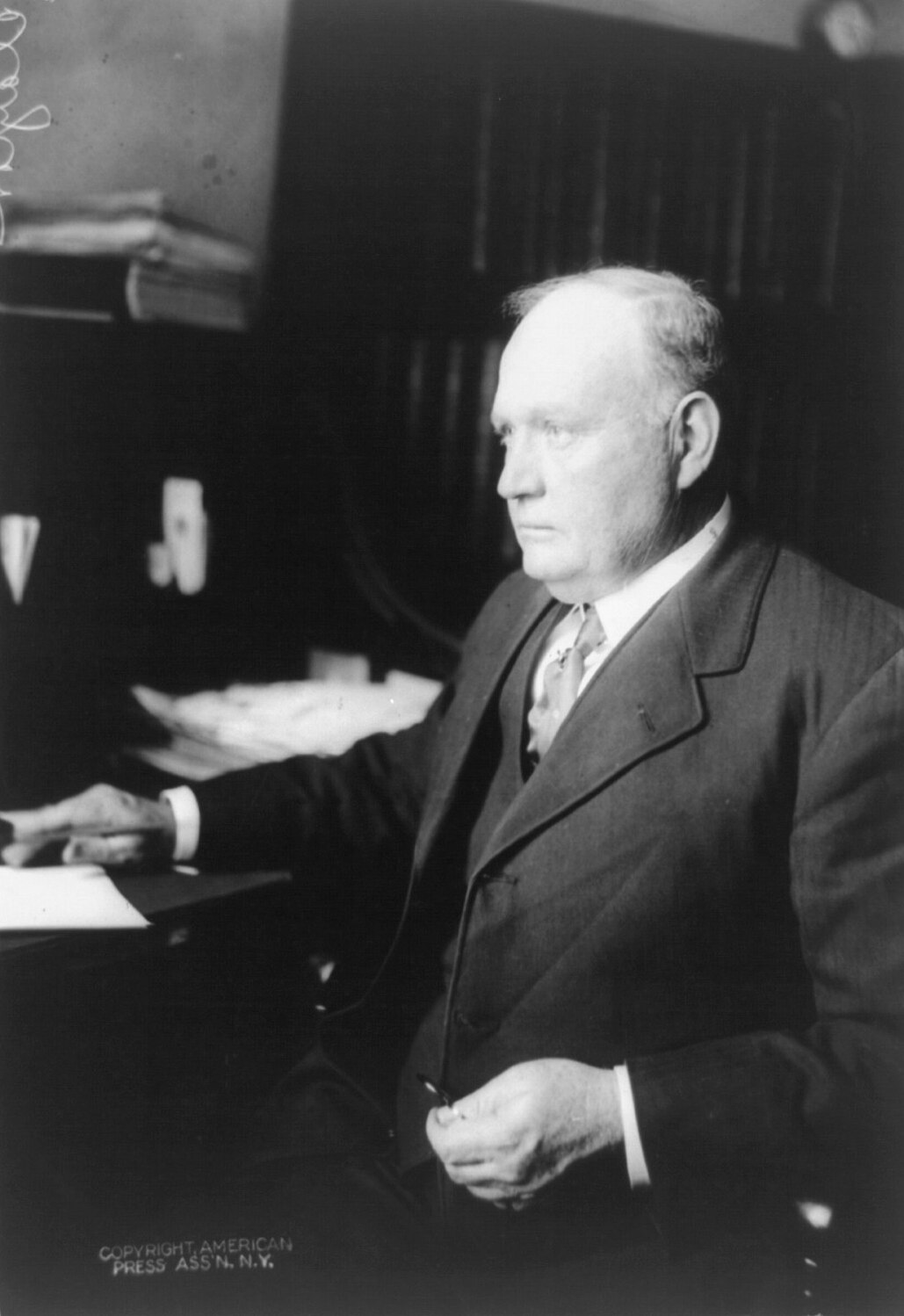
- Clayton c. 1910

Judge of the Middle and Northern districts of Alabama
- In office May 2, 1914 – December 21, 1929
- Appointed by: Woodrow Wilson
- Preceded by: Thomas G. Jones
- Succeeded by: Charles Brents Kennamer

Member of the U.S. House of Representatives from Alabama's 3rd district
- In office March 4, 1897 – May 2, 1914
- Preceded by: George Paul Harrison Jr.
- Succeeded by: William Oscar Mulkey

Member of the Alabama House of Representatives
- In office 1890–1901

Personal details
- Born: Henry De Lamar Clayton Jr. February 10, 1857 Clayton, Alabama, U.S.
- Died: December 21, 1929 (aged 72) Montgomery, Alabama, U.S.
- Party: Democratic
- Spouse: Bettie Davis
- Relatives: Henry Clayton (father); Bertram Tracy Clayton (brother)
- Education: University of Alabama (BA, LLB)

Henry De Lamar Clayton Jr. (February 10, 1857 – December 21, 1929) was a United States representative from Alabama and a United States district judge of the United States District Court for the Middle District of Alabama and the United States District Court for the Northern District of Alabama.

== Education and career ==
Born on February 10, 1857, near Clayton, in Barbour County, Alabama, Clayton attended the common schools, then received a Bachelor of Arts degree in 1877 from the University of Alabama and a Bachelor of Laws in 1878 from the University of Alabama School of Law. He was admitted to the bar in 1878 and entered private practice in Clayton. He continued private practice in nearby Eufaula, Alabama from 1880 to 1914. He was a register in chancery for Barbour County from 1880 to 1884. He was a member of the Alabama House of Representatives from 1890 to 1891. He was the United States Attorney for the Middle District of Alabama from 1893 to 1896. He was permanent chairman of the Democratic National Convention in 1908.

== Congressional service ==
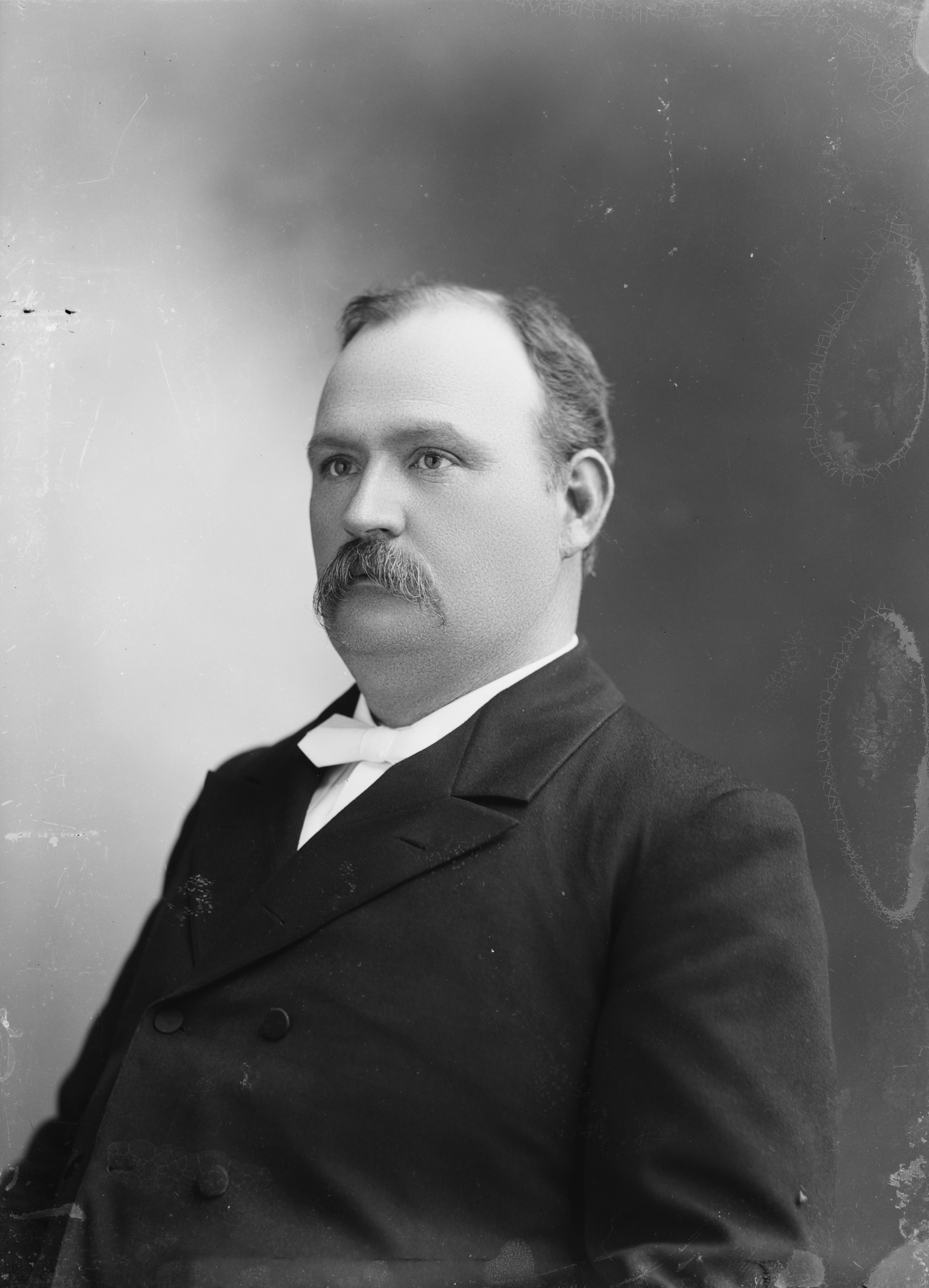
Portrait by C. M. Bell c. 1897–1901

Clayton was elected as a Democrat to the United States House of Representatives of the 55th United States Congress and to the eight succeeding Congresses and served from March 4, 1897, until May 25, 1914, when he resigned and moved to Montgomery, Alabama to accept a federal judgeship. He was Chairman of the United States House Committee on the Judiciary for the 62nd and 63rd United States Congresses. He was sponsor of the Clayton Antitrust Act of 1914. He was one of the managers appointed by the House of Representatives in 1905 to conduct the impeachment proceedings against Charles Swayne, Judge of the United States District Court for the Northern District of Florida, and in 1912 against Robert W. Archbald, Judge of the United States Commerce Court. He was appointed to the United States Senate to fill the vacancy caused by the death of United States Senator Joseph F. Johnston, but his appointment was challenged and withdrawn.

== Federal judicial service ==
Clayton was nominated by President Woodrow Wilson on May 2, 1914, to a joint seat on the United States District Court for the Middle District of Alabama and the United States District Court for the Northern District of Alabama vacated by Judge Thomas G. Jones. He was confirmed by the United States Senate on May 2, 1914, and received his commission the same day. His service terminated on December 21, 1929, due to his death in Montgomery. He was interred in Fairview Cemetery in Eufaula.

== Family ==
Clayton's father, Henry DeLamar Clayton, was a Major General in the Confederate States Army. His brother, Bertram Tracy Clayton, was a United States Representative from New York. His earliest immigrant ancestors came to North America from England. He was descended from Henry Grey, 1st Earl of Stamford, Robert Bertie, 1st Earl of Lindsey and William Villiers, 2nd Viscount Grandison. Many of his ancestors were Cavaliers during the English Civil War. He was a direct descendant of a member of the British Parliament, Robert Clayton.

== Home ==
Clayton's home in Clayton, the Henry D. Clayton House, was declared a National Historic Landmark in 1976.

== Sources ==
- "Henry D. Clayton Jr". Biographical Directory of the United States Congress.

== Bibliography ==
- Rodabaugh, Karl. "Congressman Henry D. Clayton and the Dothan Post Office Fight: Patronage and Politics in the Progressive Era." Alabama Review 33 (April 1980): 125-49;
- Rodabaugh, Karl. "Congressman Henry D. Clayton, Patriarch in Politics: A Southern Congressman During the Progressive Era." Alabama Review 31 (April 1978): 110-20.

U.S. House of Representatives
Preceded by George Paul Harrison Jr.	Member of the U.S. House of Representatives from Alabama's 3rd congressional district 1897–1914	Succeeded by William Oscar Mulkey
Preceded by Richard W. Parker	Chair of the House Judiciary Committee; 1911–1914	Succeeded by Edwin Y. Webb
Legal offices
Preceded by Thomas G. Jones	Judge of the United States District Court for the Middle District of Alabama; 1914–1929	Succeeded by Charles Brents Kennamer
Preceded by Thomas G. Jones	Judge of the United States District Court for the Northern District of Alabama; 1914–1929	Succeeded by Charles Brents Kennamer
