= Thomas J. Clarke (Alabama politician) =

Alabama state legislator

Thomas J. Clarke was a farmer, state legislator and constable in Alabama.

Clarke was born in South Carolina 1842/3. In August 1872, he was nominated to run for the house as a Radical Republican. He represented Barbour County, Alabama in the Alabama House of Representatives from 1872 to 1874. In 1885 and 1886, he served as a constable in Lincoln, Alabama (Talladega County).

His election victory was contested, but a House committee determined he and others were legitimately elected. He and other Alabama state legislators protested the election of George Goldthwaite as U.S. senator. In 1874, he was serving as Barbour County tax assessor.

== See also ==
- African American officeholders from the end of the Civil War until before 1900
