= Henry DeLamar Clayton (general) =

American politician and soldier

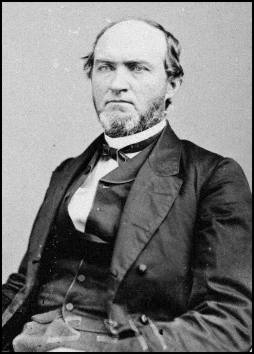
- Born: March 7, 1827; Pulaski County, Georgia
- Died: October 3, 1889 (aged 62); Tuscaloosa, Alabama
- Military career
- Allegiance: Confederate States of America
- Branch: Confederate States Army
- Rank: Major General
- Commands: 1st Regiment Alabama Infantry
- Conflicts: American Civil War

Henry DeLamar Clayton, Sr. (March 7, 1827 – October 3, 1889) was an Alabama attorney, politician, Redeemer judge, and college president. He also served as a major general in the Confederate Army during the American Civil War, commanding a division in the Army of Tennessee in the Western Theater.

== Early life and career ==
Henry D. Clayton was born in Pulaski County, Georgia. He graduated from Emory and Henry College in Virginia. He moved to Eufaula, Alabama, after graduation and read law. He passed the bar exam in 1849 and opened an office in Clayton, Alabama, where he married Victoria Hunter and raised a family. Two of his sons, Henry De Lamar Clayton, Jr. and Bertram Tracy Clayton, later became United States Congressmen. His brother-in-law James L. Pugh was also a Congressman and his grandson was Henry C. Walthour, a noted businessman.

He was twice elected to the Alabama House of Representatives, serving from 1857 until 1861. Clayton recruited and organized a local militia organization and was elected as its captain. Among his subordinate officers was future fellow Civil War general William W. Adams. In August 1860, he was elected as colonel of the 3rd Alabama Volunteers, a statewide militia organization.

== Civil War ==
Following the secession of Alabama from the Union, Clayton led his men to Pensacola, Florida, to enroll into the service of the new Confederate States of America in January 1861. Their services were initially not needed, but Clayton was subsequently ordered to take command of all incoming Alabama volunteer troops as they assembled in Pensacola. The 1st Alabama Infantry was formally mustered into Confederate service in late March, with Clayton as its first colonel. The regiment saw combat over two days, of which the 1st Alabama performed admirably at the Battle in the Bay for Port Barrancas.

In January 1862, Clayton resigned his commission and returned to Alabama. There, the governor authorized him to raise a new regiment for Confederate service, the 39th Alabama. Clayton was appointed as its first colonel, and the regiment joined the brigade of Brig. Gen. Franklin Gardner. Clayton's first significant campaign was as a part of the army of Braxton Bragg during his 1862 Kentucky Campaign.

Clayton's regiment fought at the Battle of Stones River in the early winter as a part of the brigade of Brig. Gen. Zachariah Deas. Clayton suffered a severe wound, but recovered and was promoted to brigadier general in April 1863. He was assigned command of a brigade previously led by Alexander P. Stewart consisting of the 18th, 32nd, 36th, 38th, and 58th Alabama regiments. Clayton was active in a number of subsequent campaigns and battles, including Chickamauga and Chattanooga. His brigade played a prominent role in several fights during the 1864 Atlanta campaign. Following the Battle of New Hope Church, Clayton was promoted to major general and assigned command of Stewart's division in the Army of Tennessee, where it participated in the unsuccessful Franklin-Nashville Campaign.

In April 1865, during the Carolinas campaign, Clayton resigned his commission and returned home, a victim of chronic stress.

== Postbellum career ==
With the fall of the Confederacy, Clayton resumed his law practice. In May 1866, he was elected as a circuit court judge. Like so many other former Confederates, he was removed from his office by the Reconstruction government. He was twice reelected as judge in 1874 and 1880. In 1886, Clayton accepted a position as the president of the University of Alabama, a role he held until his death in Tuscaloosa, Alabama, in the fall of 1889. He is buried in Eufaula.

== See also ==
- List of American Civil War generals (Confederate)
