= Eufaula, Alabama =

City in Alabama, United States

Eufaula, Alabama Yofalv (Creek)
- City
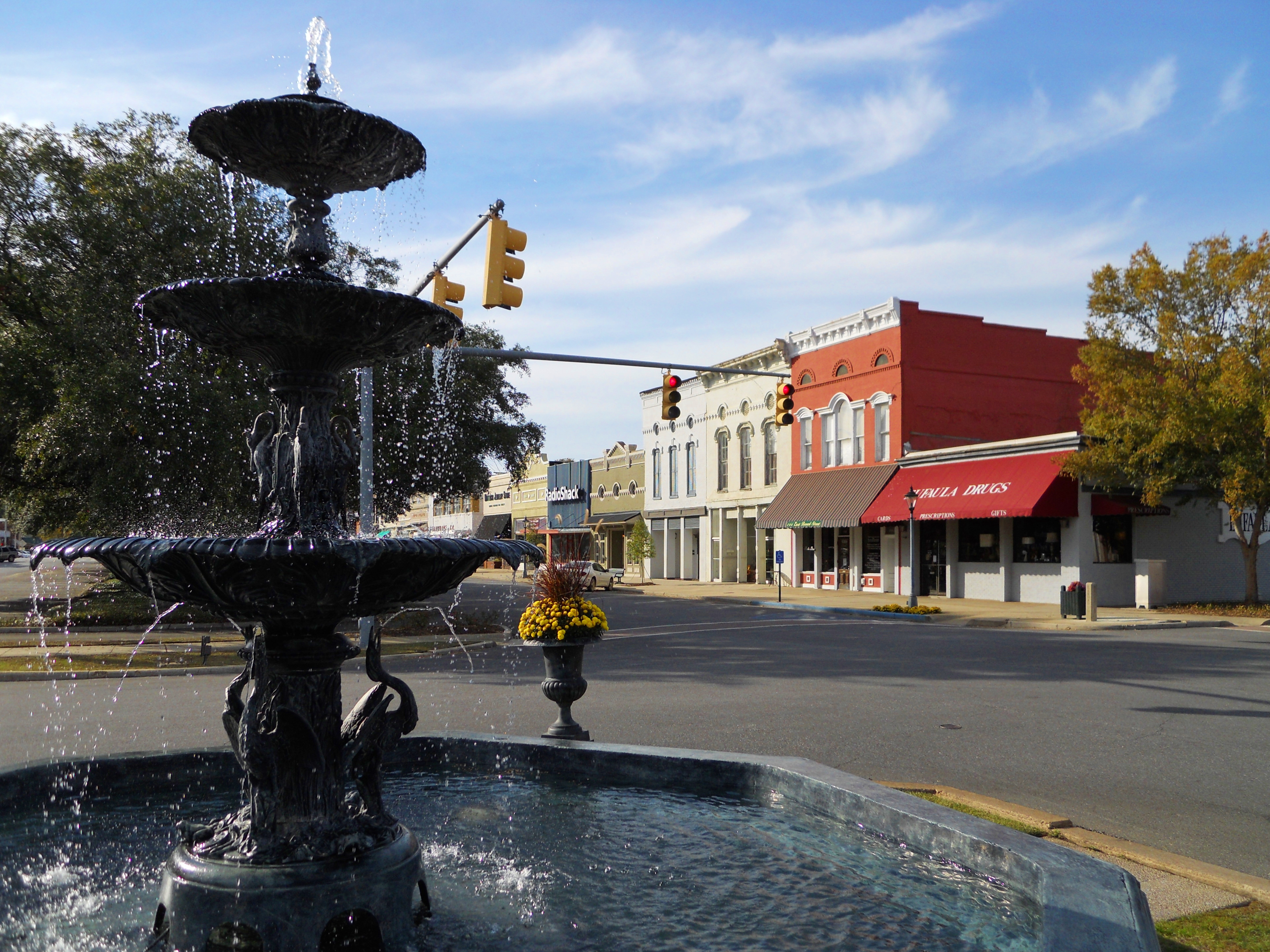
- The MacMonnies Fountain in downtown Eufaula

- Logo

- Location of Eufaula in Barbour County, Alabama
- Coordinates: 31°53′21″N 85°09′23″W
- Country: United States
- State: Alabama
- County: Barbour
- Named for: Eufaulas

Area
  - Total: 73.48 sq mi (190.30 km^{2})
  - Land: 59.51 sq mi (154.14 km^{2})
  - Water: 13.96 sq mi (36.16 km^{2})
- Elevation: 207 ft (63 m)

Population (2020)
  - Total: 12,882
  - Density: 216.4/sq mi (83.57/km^{2})
- Time zone: UTC-6 (Central (CST))
  - Summer (DST): UTC-5 (CDT)
- ZIP code: 36027, 36072
- Area code: 334
- FIPS code: 01-24568
- GNIS feature ID: 2403575
- Website: eufaulaalabama.com

Eufaula (Note: /juːˈfɔːlə/ yoo-FAW-lə; Creek: Yofalv, yofá:la, Creek pronunciation: [jofɑ́ːlə].) is the largest city in Barbour County, Alabama, United States. As of the 2020 census, Eufaula had a population of 12,882.

== History ==
Slaves worth $150,000 to be purchased for construction of railroad (Daily Confederation, November 10, 1859)

The site along the Chattahoochee River that is now modern-day Eufaula was occupied by three Muscogee Creek tribes, including the Eufaulas. By the 1820s the land was part of the Creek Indian Territory and supposedly off-limits to white settlement. By 1827 enough illegal white settlement had occurred that the Creeks appealed to the federal government for protection of their property rights. In July of that year, federal troops were sent to the Eufaula area to remove the settlers by force of arms, a conflict known as the "Intruders War".

The Creeks signed the Treaty of Washington in 1826, ceding most of their land in Georgia and eastern Alabama to the United States, but it was not fully effective in practice until the late 1820s. The 1832 Treaty of Cusseta, by which the Creeks ceded all land east of the Mississippi River to the United States, allowed white settlers to legally buy land from the Creek. However, the treaty's terms did not require any natives to relocate. By 1835 the land on which the town was built had been mostly purchased by white settlers, and had a store, owned in part by William Irwin, after whom the new settlement was named "Irwinton".

By the mid 1830s downtown Irwinton was platted out and development was well underway. Much of its historic character has been preserved and is now known as the Seth Lore and Irwinton Historic District. In 1842 or 1843 Irwinton was renamed "Eufaula", possibly to end postal confusion ensuing from its proximity to Irwinton, Georgia. The town was officially incorporated under that name in 1857.

In 1850 secessionists in the town formed a vigilante committee which terrorized any white people who had abolitionist sympathies. Thus captain Elisha Bett was driven from the town and only returned after he had signed a written agreement not to express his views again.

Significant numbers of Jewish settlers came to Eufaula in the middle of the nineteenth century from Germany and from neighboring states. The community founded a cemetery; the first burial took place in 1845.

By the late 1850s, Eufaula's advantageous location on the Chattahoochee made it a major shipping center for cargo bound for the Port of Apalachicola and, from there, to major world markets such as Liverpool and New York City. By this time, planning for the Montgomery and Eufaula Railroad, which was to include a new bridge over the Chattahoochee, was well underway. By November 1859 the railroad company authorized its president to purchase slaves worth $150,000 to use for the construction of the railroad. Grading for the track bed began in January 1860. By 1861, when it had become clear that the American Civil War was imminent, work on the railroad was suspended to allow the laborers to lay track between Montgomery, Alabama, and Pensacola, Florida, to facilitate the transport of Confederate troops to the Gulf of Mexico. Work on the railroad was resumed after the war, and, in October 1871, the tracks finally reached the city limits of Eufaula and a depot agent, John O. Martin, was appointed to run that terminal station.

=== The Civil War in Eufaula ===
Very little is known about the history of Eufaula during the American Civil War because very few contemporary records or newspapers survive. Alabama seceded from the United States on January 11, 1861. By the end of the month a military encampment was founded at Eufaula with soldiers ready to decamp to Fort Pickens or elsewhere as needed at the onset of hostilities. Ultimately six companies of the Confederate States Army (CSA) were raised at Eufaula and Barbour County. One of these was the Eufaula Zouaves, one of dozens of military units on both sides that adopted that name, patterning their uniforms and order of battle after the French light infantry units on which they were modeled.

The CSA operated a military hospital in Eufaula during the conflict. Eufaula's strategic position on the Chattahoochee river involved it in the naval component of the Confederate war effort, and at least one ironclad warship was constructed in the city. By April 1865, the Union Army had occupied Selma, Alabama, and plans were made to move the Alabama state government to Eufaula should Montgomery fall to Federal troops.

Montgomery was captured on April 12 and governor Thomas H. Watts, with other state officials, fled to Eufaula, establishing what the New York Daily Tribune called "the fugitive seat of Government of Alabama". On April 29, 1865, Union general Benjamin Grierson had reached Clayton, Alabama, and word had finally made it to Eufaula that the war was over. The mayor of Eufaula and some members of the city council rode over to Clayton to escort Grierson into Eufaula, thus ensuring a generally peaceful transition to Federal control of the city.

Eufaula was the site of what may have been the last battle of the Civil War. On May 19, 1865, at Hobdy's Bridge near Eufaula a Confederate detachment attacked a 44-man detachment from companies C and F of the Union's 1st Florida Cavalry Regiment, resulting in one soldier killed and three wounded.

By May 1865 the Daily Intelligencer of Atlanta reported that 10,000 Union troops had occupied Eufaula. In the immediate aftermath of the occupation there was a food riot and an "attempt to illegally distribute the public stores". By the end of May Eufaula was sufficiently pacified that a special agent of the United States Post Office was able to deliver mail from Providence, Rhode Island, to the town via Macon, Georgia, without need for any of the twenty-five armed guards he had brought with him to defend him with violence.

=== Reconstruction in Eufaula ===
By August 1865 cotton shipping out of Eufaula was increasing again, mostly in barter for household goods, which were arriving by ship in increasing quantities. However, the quantity of cotton being shipped out was nowhere near antebellum levels, and ships bound for Apalachicola were far below capacity. In November 1865 the Federal garrison that had been occupying Eufaula was relieved of duty by two companies of the 8th Iowa Volunteer Infantry Regiment, whose commander, John Bell, assured the citizens that they would not "be disturbed in their lawful business."

In March 1867, the United States Congress passed the first of four Reconstruction Acts and the Reconstruction Era began in earnest. Alabama, and therefore Eufaula, was placed in the Third Military District under the command of General John Pope. By the time the first elections were held under the new regime, in October 1867, Barbour County had about 5,000 registered voters, with about 1,500 white and 3,500 black.

Municipal elections were held in March 1870 and white candidates won all offices except for the two fourth (of four) ward positions as aldermen, which were won by black candidates Washington Burke and Melvin Patterson. Election officials set aside Burke's and Patterson's victories for election fraud and replaced them with their white competitors R. A. Solo and T. E. Morgan as fourth ward aldermen. In the same election a radical republican candidate named Keills won the post of City Court Judge. According to the Mobile Register, Keills's "election turned upon sectional differences. The negroes made their usual noisy demonstrations, marching in from the country with fife and drum."

On November 3, 1874, members of the White League instigated the Election Riot of 1874 in Eufaula on election day, massacring at least 7 black Republicans, shooting at least 70 more, and preventing over 1,000 others from voting. They hijacked the vote count, fraudulently electing white candidates by excluding votes cast by blacks. Federal officials attempted to hold the white mob members accountable, but police falsely charged and convicted a witness with perjury, intimidating other witnesses. By 1876, with Reconstruction ended and black voters intimidated with lynching, there were just 10 black voters in the city, compared to 1,200 in February 1874.

By 1866 there was a general movement of black Baptists to separate from the white churches and form their own congregations. Black Baptists applied for permission to separate in May 1866. The permission was granted, and, after negotiations, the black Baptists were allowed to purchase an old church building to house their own congregation. This congregation formed the basis of the Eufaula Association, one of two black Baptist associations formed in Alabama prior to the founding of the state association of black Baptist churches in 1868. By 1869 the site for the new white First Baptist Church of Eufaula had been purchased and $16,000 out of an estimated $25,000 necessary for its construction had been raised.

=== Civil rights movement ===
==== Eufaula housing case ====
For a number of years after the U.S. Supreme Court's 1954 decision Brown v. Board of Education, which overturned Plessy v. Ferguson by declaring racial segregation in public schools to be unconstitutional, the schools in Eufaula remained unintegrated. In 1955 the Eufaula Housing Authority sought to use eminent domain to condemn land on which a number of black families had lived since emancipation in order to build public housing, a park, and an expansion of the white high school. The residents of the neighborhood, surrounded on all sides by white areas, thought that the city's motive was actually to keep their children out of a newly built high school once the now-inevitable racial integration occurred.

In 1958 civil rights attorneys Fred Gray and Constance Baker Motley filed a suit in the U.S. District court claiming that their clients' constitutional rights were being violated by the plan. The federal case was dismissed, but Gray (now appearing without Motley) appealed to the Alabama Circuit Court, where the case was heard by then-judge George Wallace. As before, Gray claimed that since the new development would allow white residents only, their civil rights were being violated by the City. Although his appeal of the constitutional issue was unsuccessful, Gray also appealed the city's valuations of his clients' properties and, arguing before all-white juries in Wallace's court, managed in most of the cases to win much higher prices.

==== Voting Rights Act of 1965 ====
After the passage of the Voting Rights Act of 1965 the United States Department of Justice sent federal observers into 24 southern counties to enforce its provisions regarding voter registration for the Fall 1965 elections. Many of these counties saw a significant increase in black registration, but Eufaula, not having federal supervision, had comparatively low rates. For instance, on August 16, 1965, 600 black citizens waited in line at the County courthouse in Eufaula to register, but by the time the office closed, only 265 had managed to fill out the paperwork.

In 1966 the Student Nonviolent Coordinating Committee (SNCC) responded by appointing a local Eufaulan, Daddy Bone, to organize voter registration drives in Eufaula. Bone initiated a series of nonviolent protests and boycotts of local stores that refused to hire blacks which attracted SNCC supporters from around the Southeastern United States. The city of Eufaula, under some pressure from the businessmen whose stores were targeted, passed anti-picketing laws and began arresting demonstrators en masse for violating them. Bone brought in civil rights lawyer S. S. Seay to defend the protestors, who were mostly convicted, and in such numbers as to overwhelm the county jail.

==== School integration ====
In July 1968 the United States Department of Justice filed suit against 76 Alabama school districts, including that of Eufaula, in an attempt to bring them into compliance with Brown v. Board of Education.

Schools in Eufaula remained segregated by race until the fall of 1966 and the first black students graduated with the senior class of 1967. After integration began the school stopped sponsoring social events, such as proms although unofficial segregated events were still held. By 1990, students at Eufaula High School had begun pressuring school officials to allow them to hold integrated proms, and the first such was held in 1991 without incident.

=== Other recent history ===
In 1963, the U.S. Army Corps of Engineers created Walter F. George Lake (unofficially named Lake Eufaula) behind the lock and dam of Fort Gaines, Georgia, once again assuring Eufaula's importance as an inland port.

In the early 1960s, the United States Coast Guard set up an Aids to Navigation Team in Eufaula that is still active today servicing from Columbus, Georgia, to Apalachicola, Florida, and the Flint River.

In 1964, the Eufaula National Wildlife Refuge was established along Lake Walter F. George to serve and protect many endangered and threatened species such as the American bald eagle, the American alligator, the wood stork and the peregrine falcon. The refuge is a major tourist attraction for visitors from around the country.

On March 3, 2019, a tornado hit the city as part of a larger tornado outbreak. On March 31, 2020, another tornado struck the city. There were no reports of fatalities or injuries.

Eufaula has never had an African American mayor. Jack Tibbs Jr. won his third term as mayor in 2020.

== Geography ==
The city is located along U.S. Highways 82 and 431 in southeast Alabama on the Georgia state line, adjacent to the city of Georgetown, Georgia, which is east across the Chattahoochee River from the city. U.S. 431 runs through the city from north to south as Eufaula Avenue, leading north 47 mi (76 km) to Phenix City and southwest 51 mi (82 km) to Dothan. U.S. 82 runs from west to east through the city, concurrent with U.S. 431 through the northern part of the city until it reaches the downtown area, where it then runs east-west as Barbour Street. U.S. 82 leads southeast 26 mi (42 km) to Cuthbert, Georgia and northwest 41 mi (66 km) to Union Springs. Montgomery, the state capital, is located 90 mi (140 km) to the northwest via U.S. 82.

According to the U.S. Census Bureau, the city has a total area of 73.5 square miles (190 km^{2}), of which 59.4 square miles (154 km^{2}) is land and 14.1 square miles (37 km^{2}) (19.13%) is water. It sits on a reservoir called Walter F. George Lake, or Lake Eufaula to locals.

=== Climate ===
The climate in this area is characterized by hot, humid summers and generally mild to cool winters. According to the Köppen Climate Classification system, Eufaula has a humid subtropical climate, abbreviated "Cfa" on climate maps.

Climate data for Eufaula, Alabama, 1991–2020 normals, extremes 1967–2022
Month	Jan	Feb	Mar	Apr	May	Jun	Jul	Aug	Sep	Oct	Nov	Dec	Year
Record high °F (°C)	82 (28)	86 (30)	90 (32)	95 (35)	99 (37)	105 (41)	104 (40)	106 (41)	101 (38)	100 (38)	90 (32)	84 (29)	106 (41)
Mean maximum °F (°C)	74.6 (23.7)	77.7 (25.4)	83.8 (28.8)	87.0 (30.6)	92.8 (33.8)	95.9 (35.5)	97.8 (36.6)	97.2 (36.2)	94.5 (34.7)	88.6 (31.4)	82.1 (27.8)	76.4 (24.7)	99.0 (37.2)
Mean daily maximum °F (°C)	62.4 (16.9)	66.7 (19.3)	74.9 (23.8)	80.4 (26.9)	87.5 (30.8)	93.0 (33.9)	94.8 (34.9)	93.9 (34.4)	89.9 (32.2)	82.1 (27.8)	72.8 (22.7)	65.2 (18.4)	80.3 (26.8)
Daily mean °F (°C)	48.9 (9.4)	52.2 (11.2)	59.6 (15.3)	65.3 (18.5)	73.4 (23.0)	80.4 (26.9)	82.7 (28.2)	81.9 (27.7)	77.3 (25.2)	67.7 (19.8)	57.8 (14.3)	51.2 (10.7)	66.5 (19.2)
Mean daily minimum °F (°C)	35.4 (1.9)	37.7 (3.2)	44.3 (6.8)	50.2 (10.1)	59.3 (15.2)	67.8 (19.9)	70.7 (21.5)	69.9 (21.1)	64.7 (18.2)	53.2 (11.8)	42.9 (6.1)	37.3 (2.9)	52.8 (11.6)
Mean minimum °F (°C)	19.9 (−6.7)	23.3 (−4.8)	27.5 (−2.5)	36.2 (2.3)	45.6 (7.6)	59.7 (15.4)	65.1 (18.4)	62.3 (16.8)	53.1 (11.7)	37.9 (3.3)	27.1 (−2.7)	23.4 (−4.8)	17.2 (−8.2)
Record low °F (°C)	5 (−15)	8 (−13)	17 (−8)	27 (−3)	36 (2)	44 (7)	55 (13)	54 (12)	33 (1)	26 (−3)	14 (−10)	8 (−13)	5 (−15)
Average precipitation inches (mm)	4.81 (122)	4.72 (120)	5.10 (130)	4.37 (111)	3.29 (84)	4.86 (123)	5.37 (136)	4.81 (122)	3.81 (97)	3.13 (80)	4.22 (107)	5.47 (139)	53.96 (1,371)
Average precipitation days (≥ 0.01 in)	8.0	7.4	7.1	6.9	5.1	7.9	9.7	7.7	5.5	4.6	5.5	7.3	82.7
Source 1: NOAA
Source 2: XMACIS2

== Demographics ==
Historical population
Census	Pop.	Note	%±
1850	3,000		—
1870	3,185		—
1880	3,836		20.4%
1890	4,394		14.5%
1900	4,532		3.1%
1910	4,259		−6.0%
1920	4,939		16.0%
1930	5,208		5.4%
1940	6,269		20.4%
1950	6,906		10.2%
1960	8,357		21.0%
1970	9,102		8.9%
1980	12,097		32.9%
1990	13,220		9.3%
2000	13,908		5.2%
2010	13,137		−5.5%
2020	12,882		−1.9%
U.S. Decennial Census

=== Racial and ethnic composition ===
Eufaula city, Alabama – Racial and ethnic composition Note: the US Census treats Hispanic/Latino as an ethnic category. This table excludes Latinos from the racial categories and assigns them to a separate category. Hispanics/Latinos may be of any race.
Race / Ethnicity (NH = Non-Hispanic)	Pop 1980	Pop 1990	Pop 2000	Pop 2010	Pop 2020	% 1980	% 1990	% 2000	% 2010	% 2020
White alone (NH)	7,773	8,541	7,913	6,509	5,637	64.26%	64.61%	56.90%	49.55%	43.76%
Black or African American alone (NH)	4,145	4,546	5,596	5,838	6,041	34.26%	34.39%	40.24%	44.44%	46.89%
Native American or Alaska Native alone (NH)	21	18	31	23	21	0.17%	0.14%	0.22%	0.18%	0.16%
Asian alone (NH)	37	41	65	85	64	0.31%	0.31%	0.47%	0.65%	0.50%
Native Hawaiian or Pacific Islander alone (NH)	x	x	5	19	0	x	x	0.04%	0.14%	0.00%
Other race alone (NH)	0	0	2	4	41	0.00%	0.00%	0.01%	0.03%	0.32%
Mixed race or Multiracial (NH)	x	x	83	93	316	x	x	0.60%	0.71%	2.45%
Hispanic or Latino (any race)	121	74	213	566	762	1.00%	0.56%	1.53%	4.31%	5.92%
Total	12,097	13,220	13,908	13,137	12,882	100.00%	100.00%	100.00%	100.00%	100.00%

=== 2020 census ===
As of the 2020 census, Eufaula had a population of 12,882. The median age was 40.3 years; 24.8% of residents were under the age of 18 and 20.2% were 65 years of age or older. For every 100 females there were 83.9 males, and for every 100 females age 18 and over there were 79.7 males age 18 and over.

66.7% of residents lived in urban areas, while 33.3% lived in rural areas.

There were 5,323 households and 3,215 families in the city; 31.6% had children under the age of 18 living in them. Of all households, 35.9% were married-couple households, 17.8% were households with a male householder and no spouse or partner present, and 41.7% were households with a female householder and no spouse or partner present. About 32.9% of all households were made up of individuals and 15.0% had someone living alone who was 65 years of age or older.

There were 6,045 housing units, of which 11.9% were vacant. The homeowner vacancy rate was 2.8% and the rental vacancy rate was 6.1%.

=== 2010 census ===
As of the census of 2010, there were 13,137 people, 5,237 households, and 3,630 families residing in the city. There were 5,829 housing units at an average density of 79.3 per square mile (30.6/km^{2}). The racial makeup of the city was 51.0% White, 44.6% Black or African American, 0.5% Native American, 0.6% Asian, 0.2% Pacific Islander, 2.2% from other races, and 0.9% from two or more races. 4.3% of the population were Hispanic or Latino of any race.

There were 5,237 households, out of which 30.2% had children under the age of 18 living with them, 42.6% were married couples living together, 22.3% had a female householder with no husband present, and 30.7% were non-families. 28.2% of all households were made up of individuals, and 11.5% had someone living alone who was 65 years of age or older. The average household size was 2.48 and the average family size was 3.01.

In the city, the population's age was spread out, with 26.1% under the age of 18, 8.6% from 18 to 24, 22.7% from 25 to 44, 27.0% from 45 to 64, and 15.6% who were 65 years of age or older. The median age was 38.9 years. For every 100 females, there were 86.3 males. For every 100 females age 18 and over, there were 84.0 males.

The median income for a household in the city was $34,025, and the median income for a family was $44,234. Males had a median income of $37,985 versus $23,890 for females. The per capita income for the city was $17,515. About 18.0% of families and 23.2% of the population were below the poverty line, including 32.8% of those under age 18 and 20.7% of those age 65 or over.

== Education ==
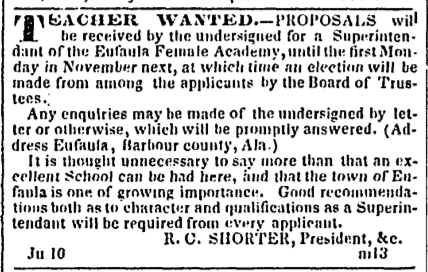
Advertisement in the Charleston Courier seeking superintendent for newly opened Eufaula Female Academy; June 18, 1844

Eufaula is served by Eufaula City Schools which has two elementary schools. It has a middle school, Admiral Moorer Middle School, named after Admiral Thomas Hinman Moorer. The local high school is Eufaula High School and their mascot is a tiger. It is also served by a private accredited school, Lakeside School. The Lakeside athletic teams are known as the Chiefs. Eufaula also has a smaller unaccredited school, Parkview Christian School. Eufaula was home to the Eufaula Female Academy, a female seminary founded in 1844.

== Culture and recreation ==
=== Historic buildings ===
Many of Eufaula's historic buildings are listed on the National Register of Historic Places. Other historic buildings include the Eufaula First United Methodist Church and the First Baptist Church of Eufaula. The Seth Lore and Irwinton Historic District, with 667 contributing properties, is the second-largest historic district in Alabama.

The Shorter Mansion was built in 1884 by Eli Shorter and is recognized by the National Trust for Historic Preservation. The bottom floor is often host to many receptions and events, while the second floor serves as a museum honoring the six Alabama governors from Barbour County, as well as Admiral Thomas Moorer, a former chairman of the Joint Chiefs of Staff.

The Holleman-Foy House is listed on the National Register of Historic Places. and stands in 215 W Broad St. The building was designed by George Franklin Barber and built in 1907 for Judge Henry Holleman. According to the National Register of Historic Places nomination the house was published in the 5th edition of Modern Dwellings (1905) under the title "An Ideal Home". In 1909 the house was sold to William Foy.

Fendall Hall, built from 1856 to 1860, is an Italianate-style historic house museum owned and operated by the Alabama Historical Commission.

=== Sports ===
Lake Eufaula is known as the "Big Bass Capital of the World".

Eufaula was home to a minor league baseball team, the Eufaula Millers, in 1952 and 1953.

=== Movie location ===
In the 2002 film Sweet Home Alabama, the historic homes shown in Melanie's (Reese Witherspoon) return to Pigeon Creek were shot in Eufaula.

=== Tree That Owns Itself ===
The Tree That Owns Itself is an oak tree in Eufaula that has been replaced several times. It was given the ownership of its land by the governor in 1936, with each of the two replacements receiving the ownership to the land too. Confederate soldier Captain John A. Walker previously owned the land.

== Notable people ==
- Alpheus Baker, brigadier general in the Confederate States Army
- Peyton Brown, model and Miss Alabama USA 2016
- Daryon Brutley, former professional football defensive back
- Edward Bullock, Confederate officer and two-term Alabama state senator
- Frank Clark, former member of the U.S. House of Representatives
- James S. Clark, speaker of the Alabama House of Representatives from 1987 to 1999
- Henry De Lamar Clayton Jr., former U.S. congressman for the 3rd District of Alabama and U.S. federal judge
- S. Hubert Dent Jr., U.S. representative for the 2nd District of Alabama from 1909 to 1921 and chairman of the House Committee on Military Affairs during World War I
- Lula Mae Hardaway, mother of entertainer Stevie Wonder
- William Henry Harrison Hart, African American attorney
- Bertha "B" Holt (born August 16, 1916), representative in the North Carolina General Assembly
- William D. Jelks, governor of Alabama
- Jerrel Jernigan, professional football player
- Walter Kehoe, U.S. representative from Florida from 1917 to 1919
- Reuben Kolb, Alabama politician
- Charles S. McDowell, tenth lieutenant governor of Alabama
- Thomas Hinman Moorer, chief of Naval Operations and chairman of the Joint Chiefs of Staff
- James L. Pugh, U.S. senator from Alabama from 1880 to 1897
- Martha Reeves, Motown singer, Martha Reeves and the Vandellas, and Detroit city councilwoman
- Walter Reeves (born December 15, 1965), professional football player
- Simon F. Rothschild (1861–1936), merchant
- Eli Sims Shorter, U.S. representative from 1855 to 1859
- John Gill Shorter, 17th governor of Alabama
- Les Snead, general manager of the NFL Los Angeles Rams
- Courtney Upshaw, professional football player
- George Wallace Jr., former Alabama public service commissioner and state treasurer
- Dave Watson, former professional football offensive lineman
- Edwin "Pa" Watson, U.S. Army major general, friend and senior aide to President Franklin D. Roosevelt
- Xavier Woodson-Luster, professional football player
- Hunter Wyatt-Brown, former bishop of Episcopal Diocese of Harrisburg (Central Pennsylvania)

== Gallery ==
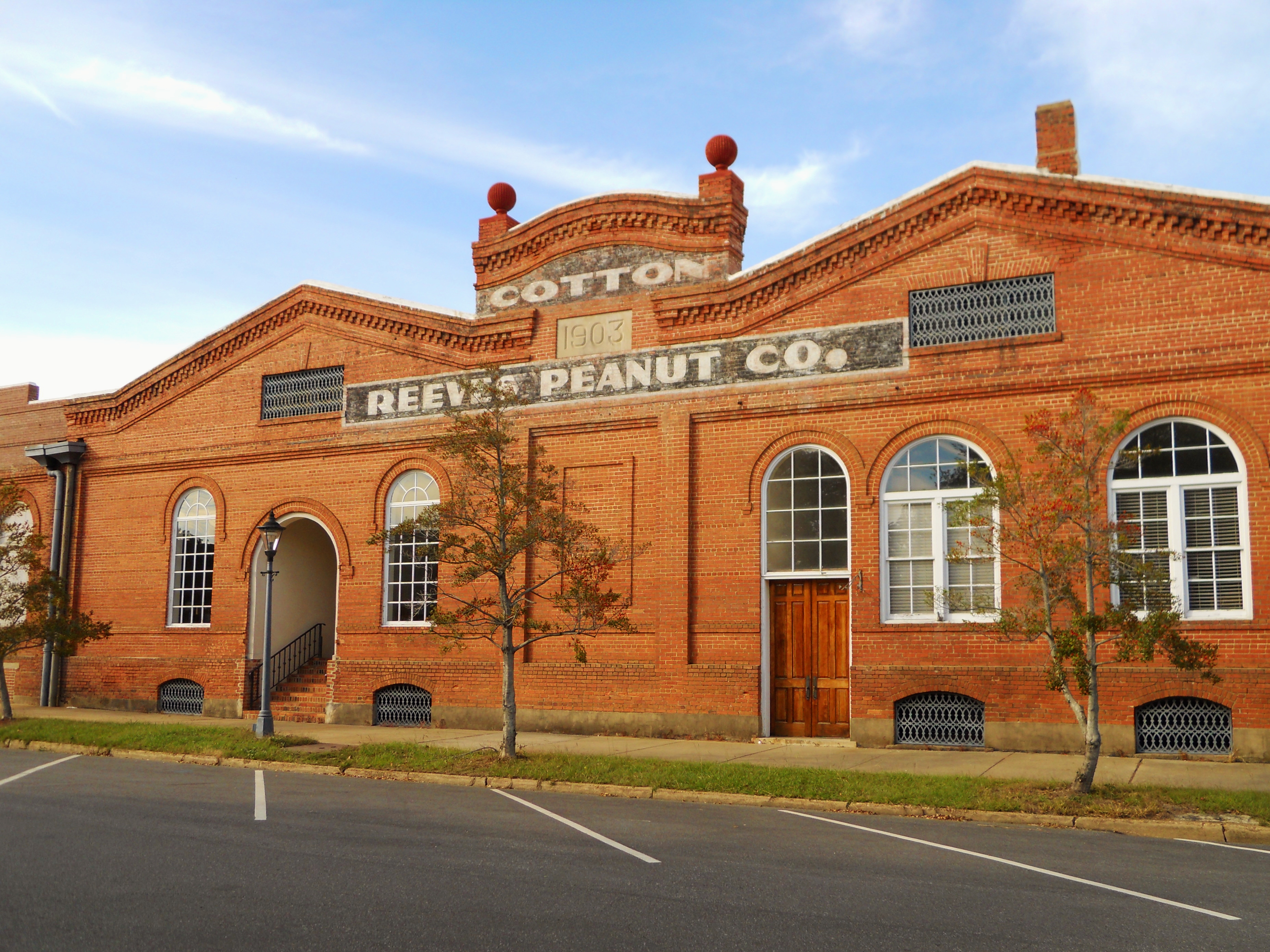
Reeves Peanut Company, the Renaissance Revival-style warehouse was built by the Eufaula Grocery Company in 1903.

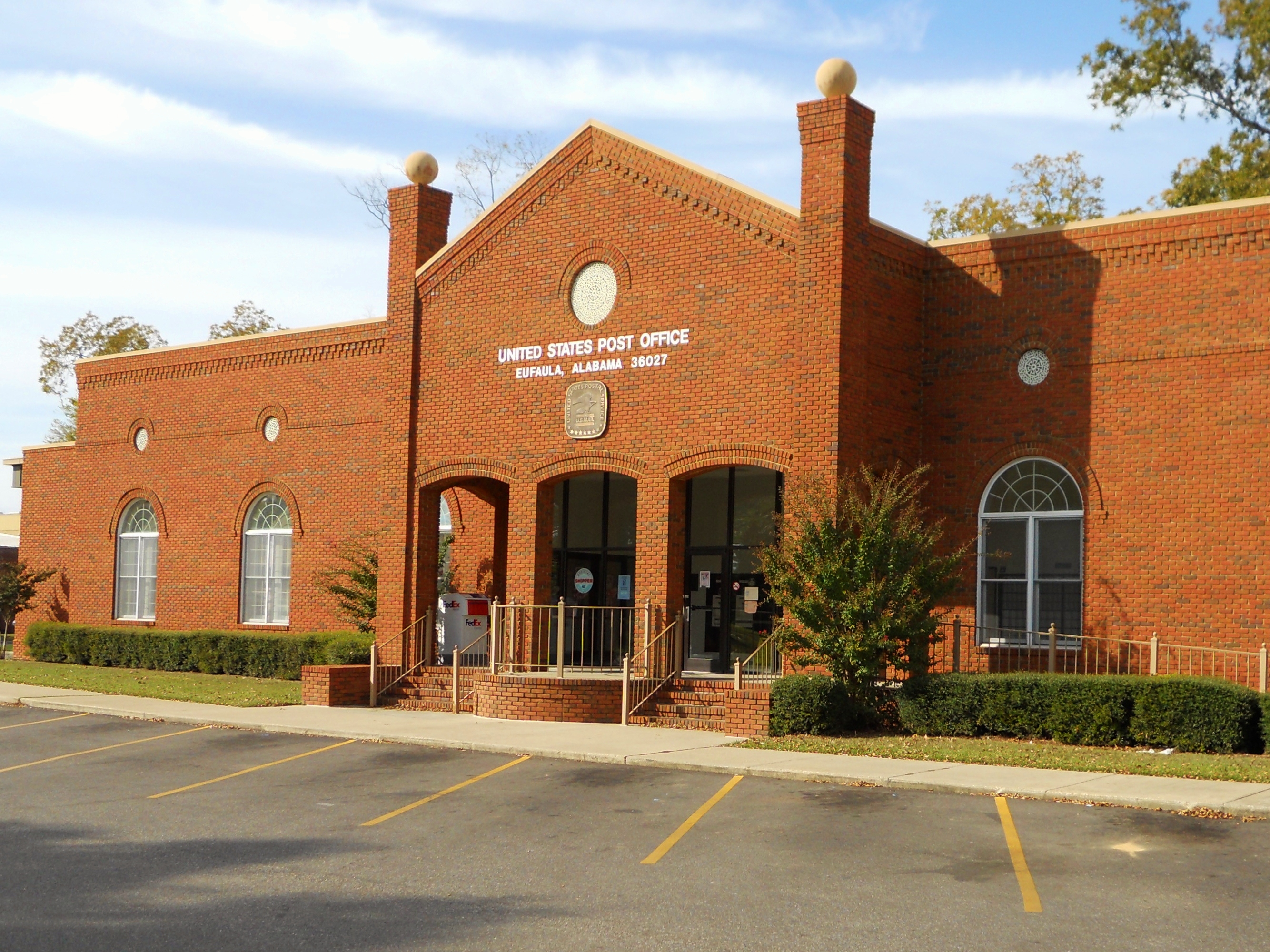
Eufaula post office (ZIP Code: 36027)

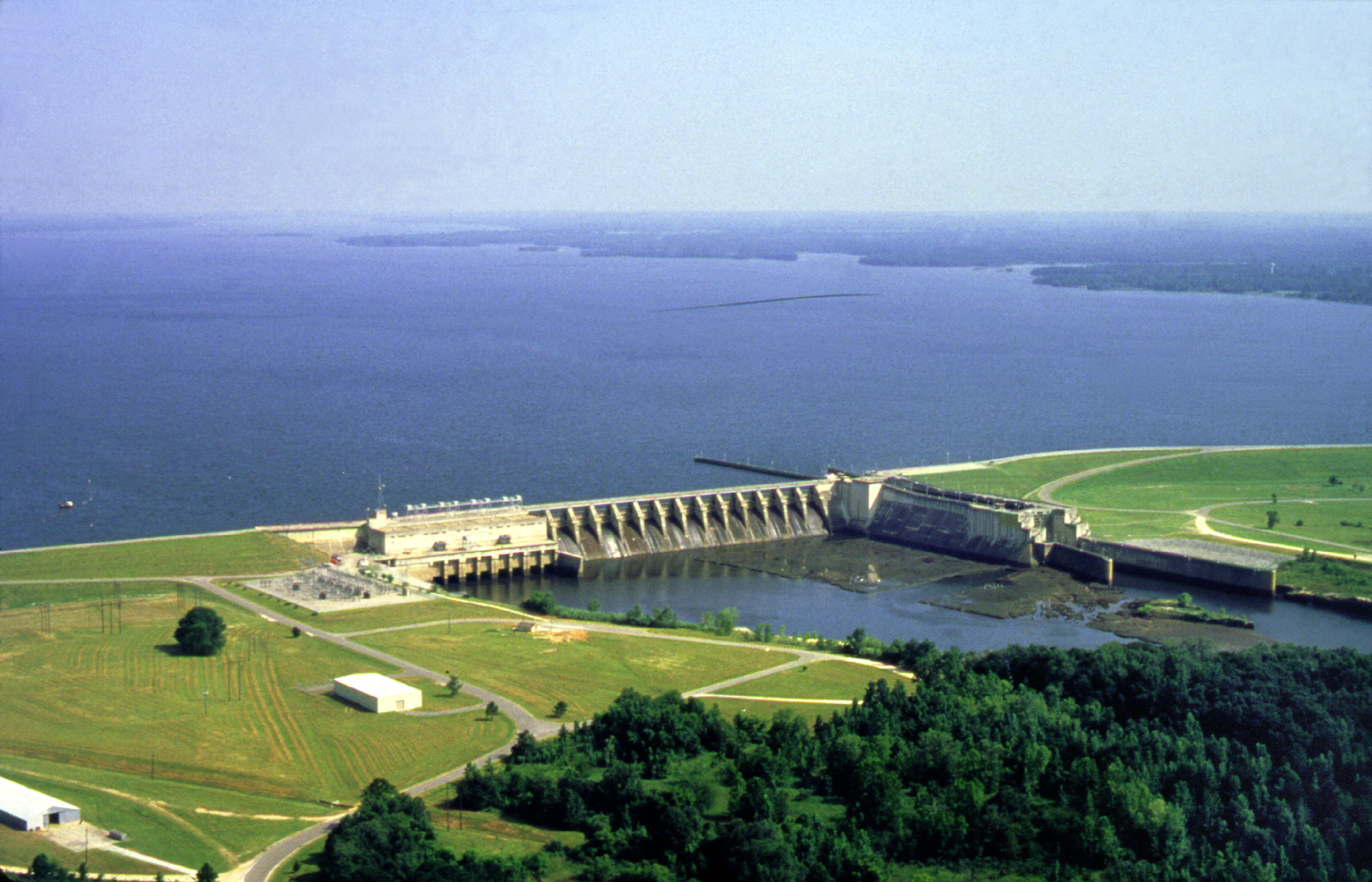
The Walter F. George lock and dam which creates Lake Eufaula.

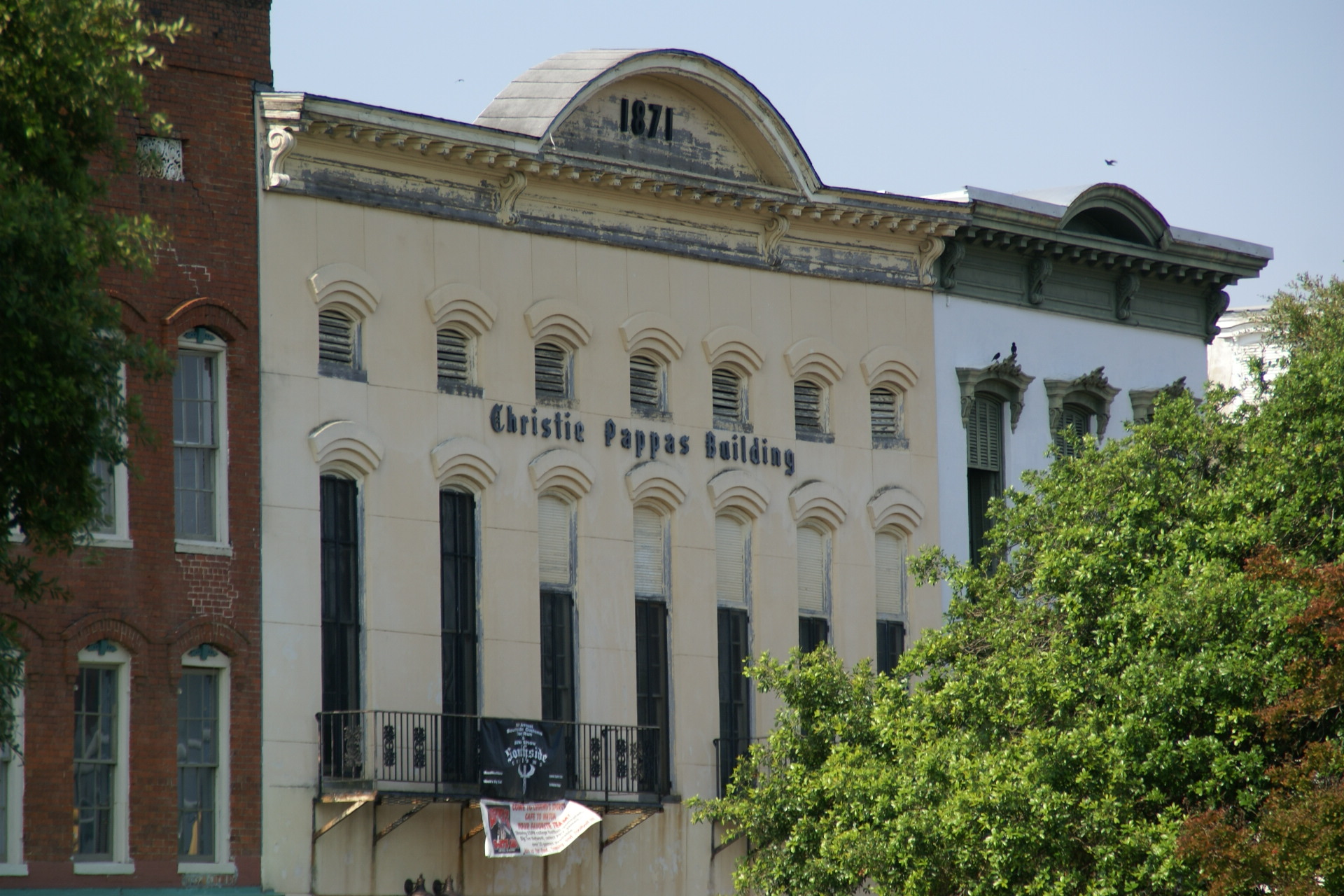
Christie Pappas Building at E. Broad Street.

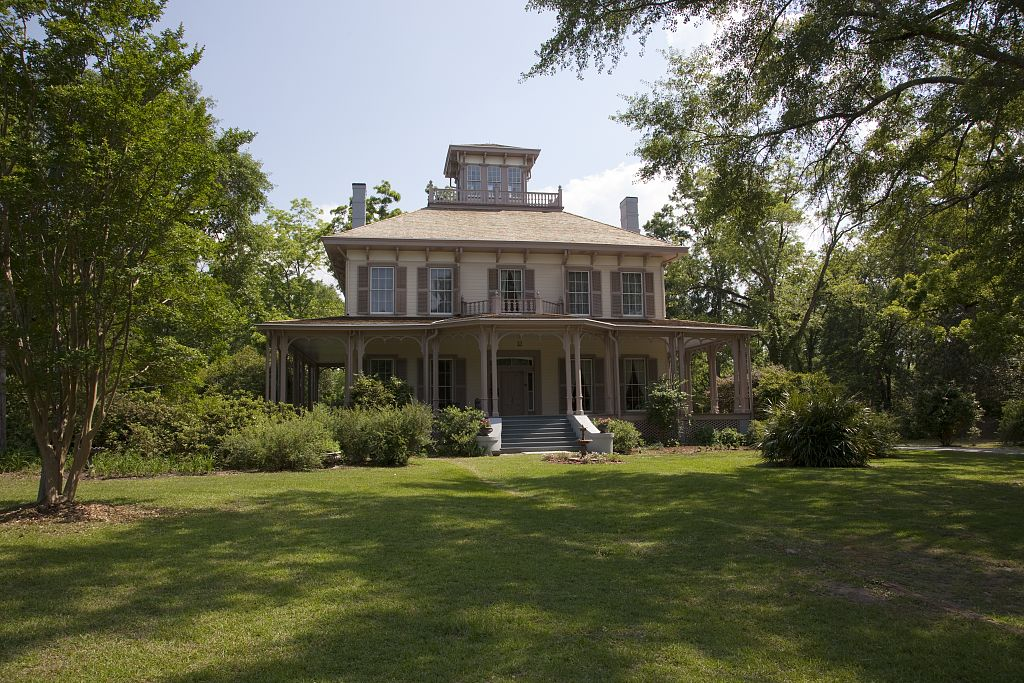
Fendall Hall, built from 1856 to 1860, is an Italianate-style historic house museum that is owned and operated by the Alabama Historical Commission. It was added to the National Register of Historic Places on July 28, 1970.

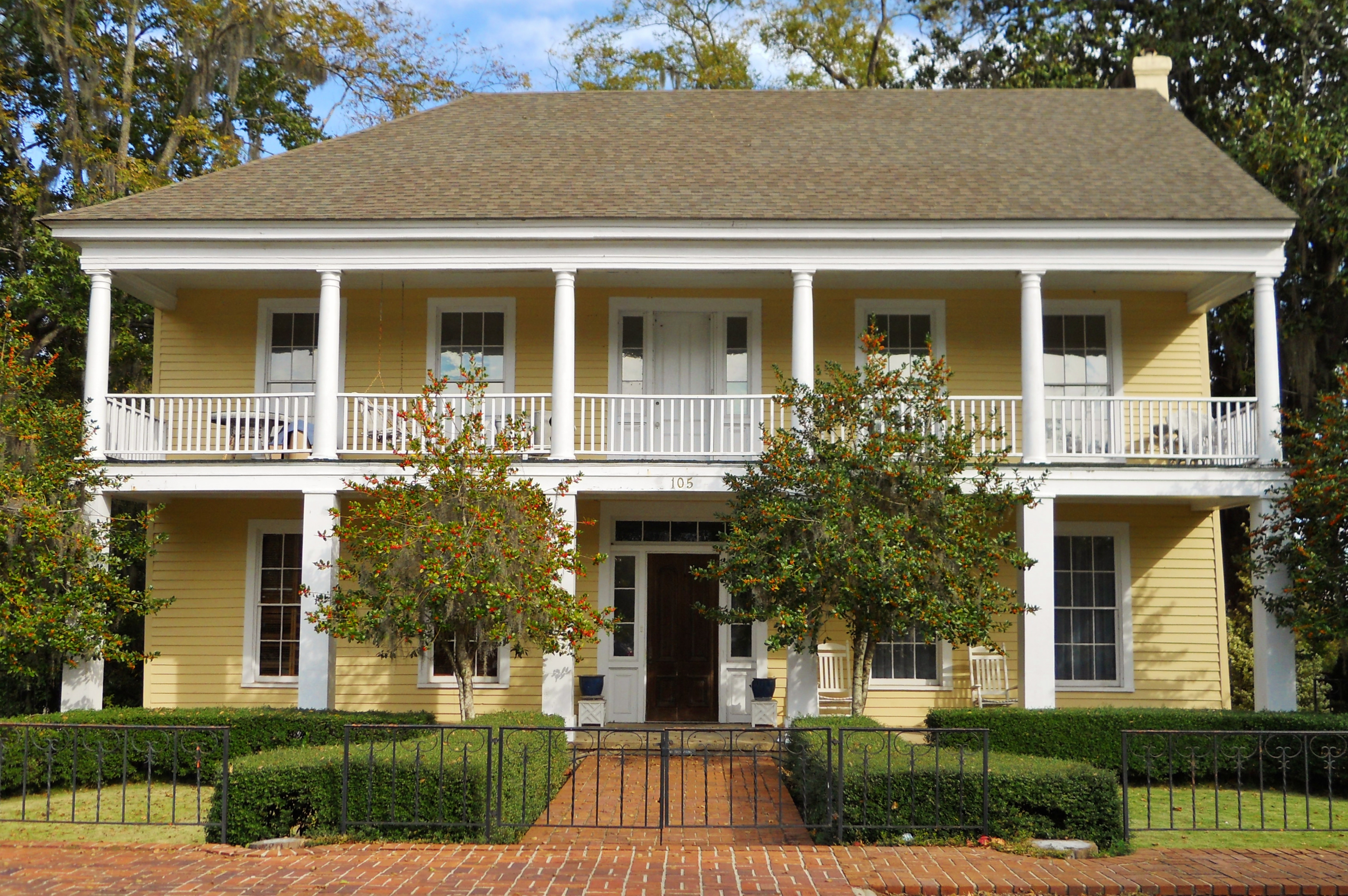
The Tavern was added to the National Register of Historic Places on October 6, 1970.

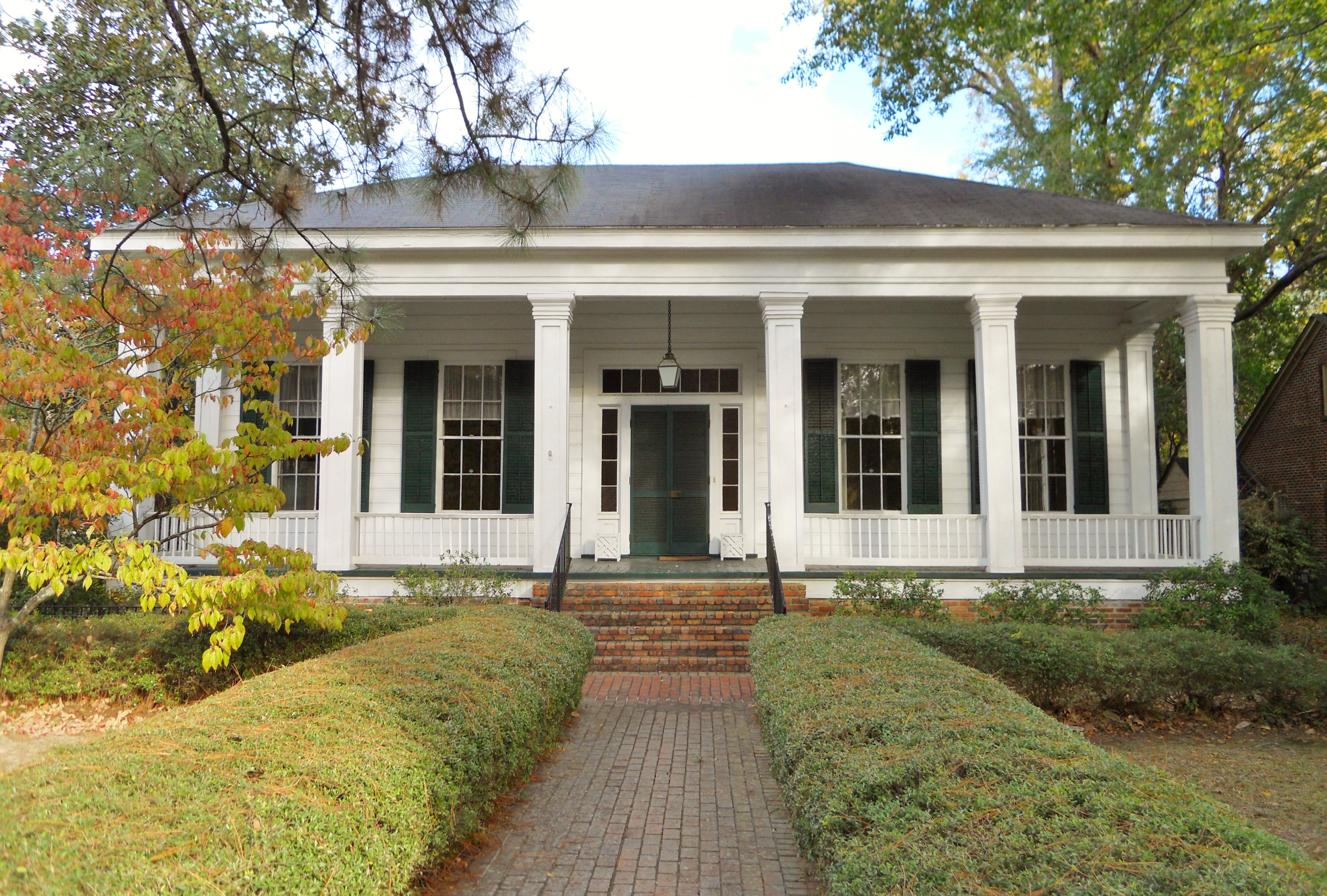
The Bray-Barron House was added to the National Register of Historic Places on May 27, 1971.

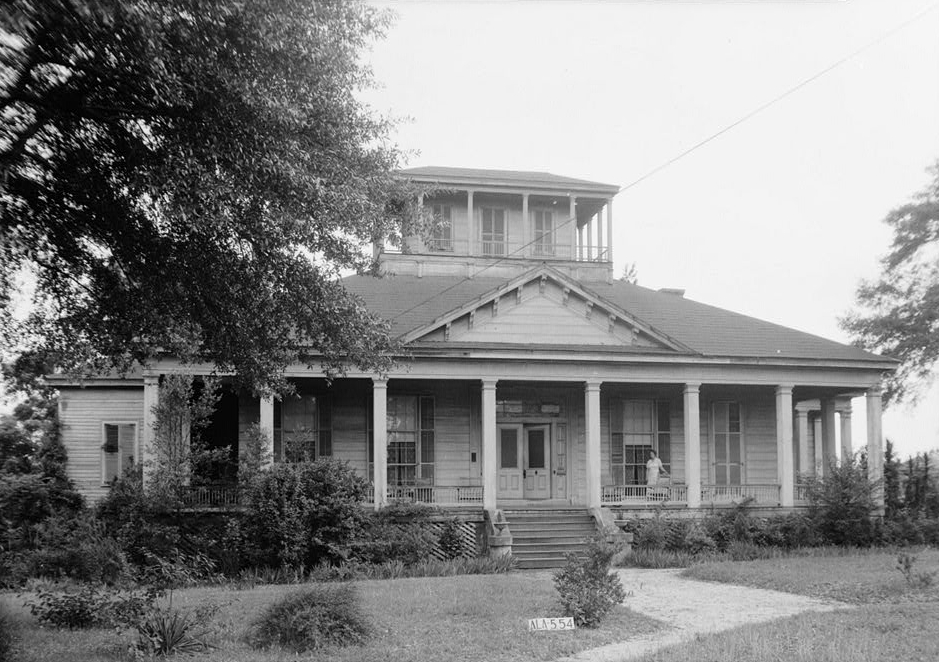
The Lewis Llewellyn Cato House was added to the National Register of Historic Places on May 27, 1971.

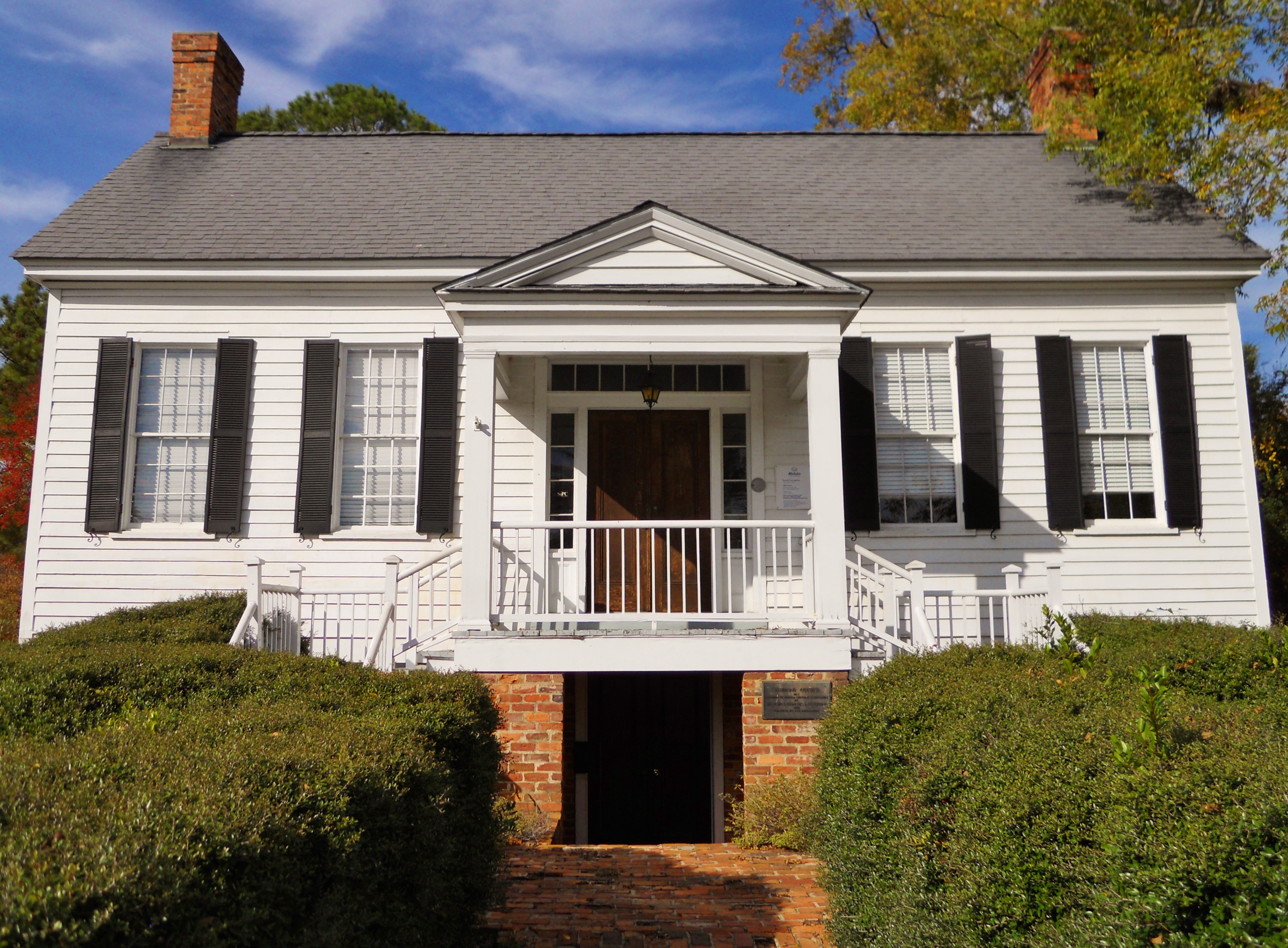
Built in 1837, Sheppard Cottage is the oldest known residence in Eufaula. It was added to the National Register of Historic Places on May 27, 1971.

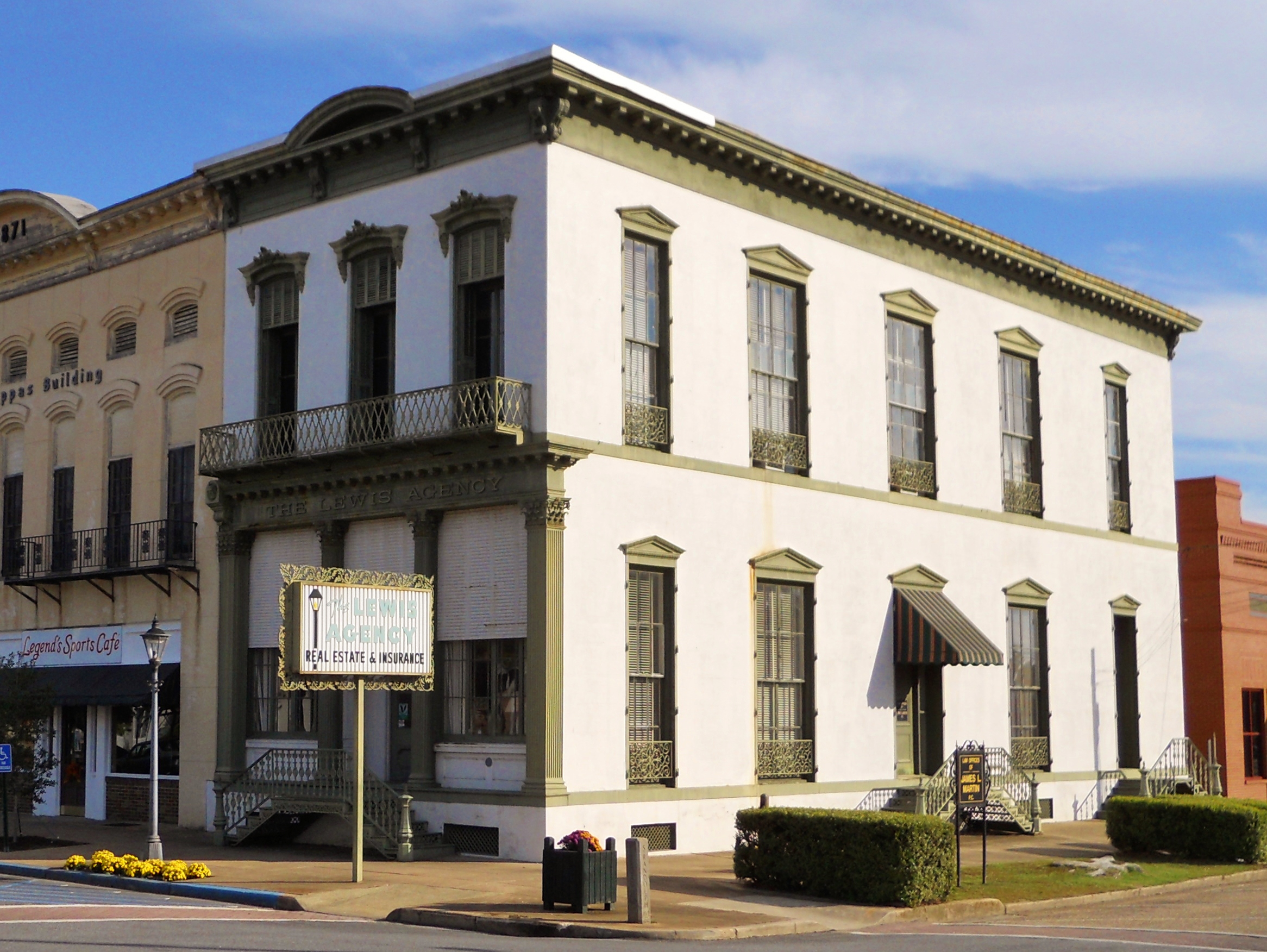
The McNab Bank Building was added to the National Register of Historic Places on June 24, 1971.

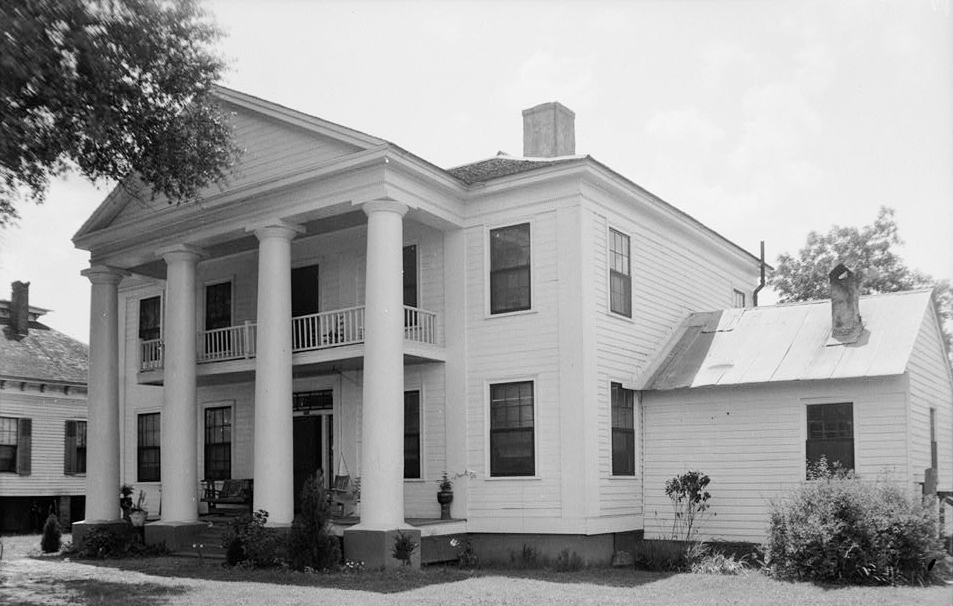
The Wellborn-Thomas House was added to the National Register of Historic Places on July 14, 1971.

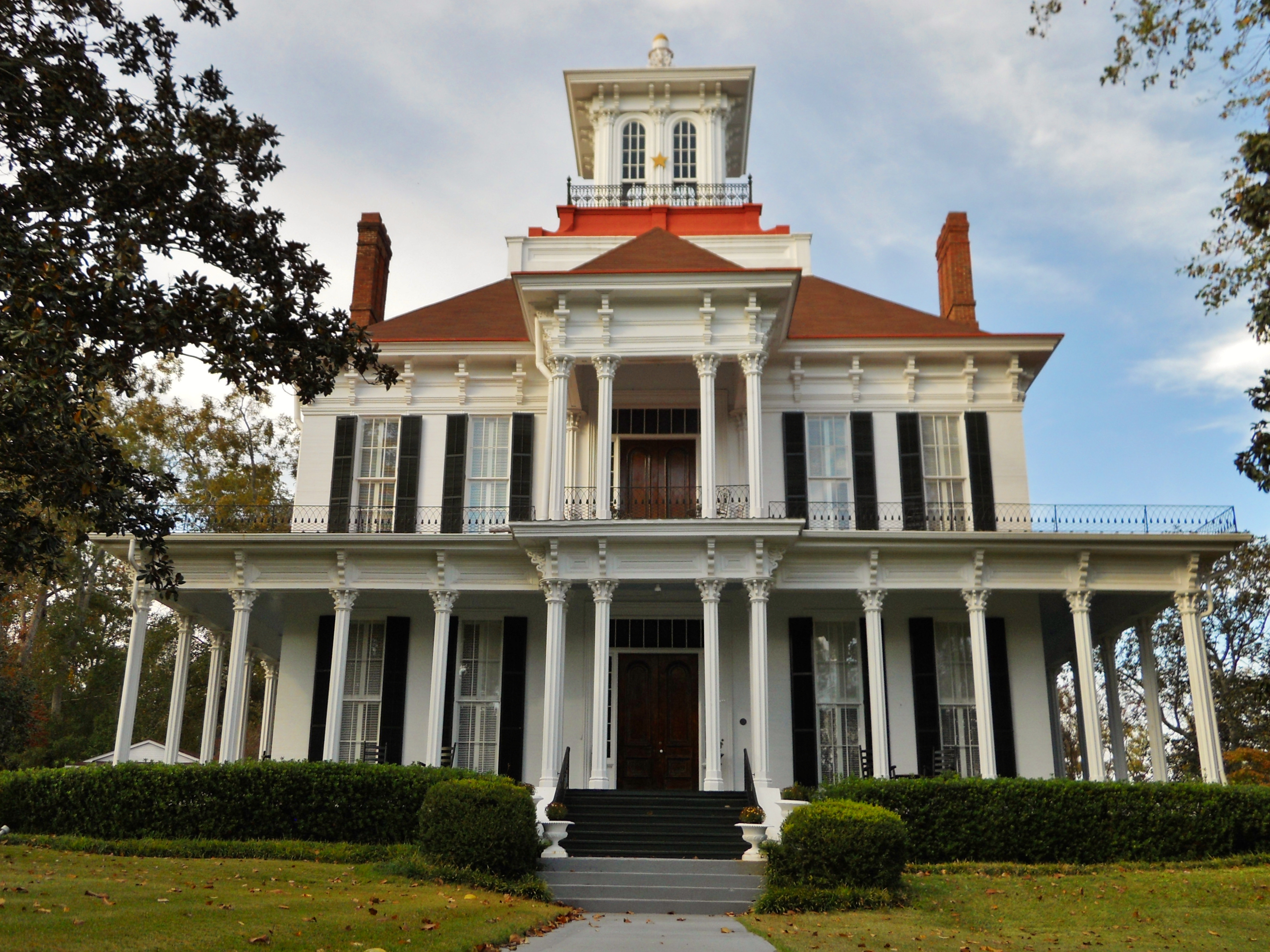
Kendall Manor was added to the National Register of Historic Places on January 14, 1972.

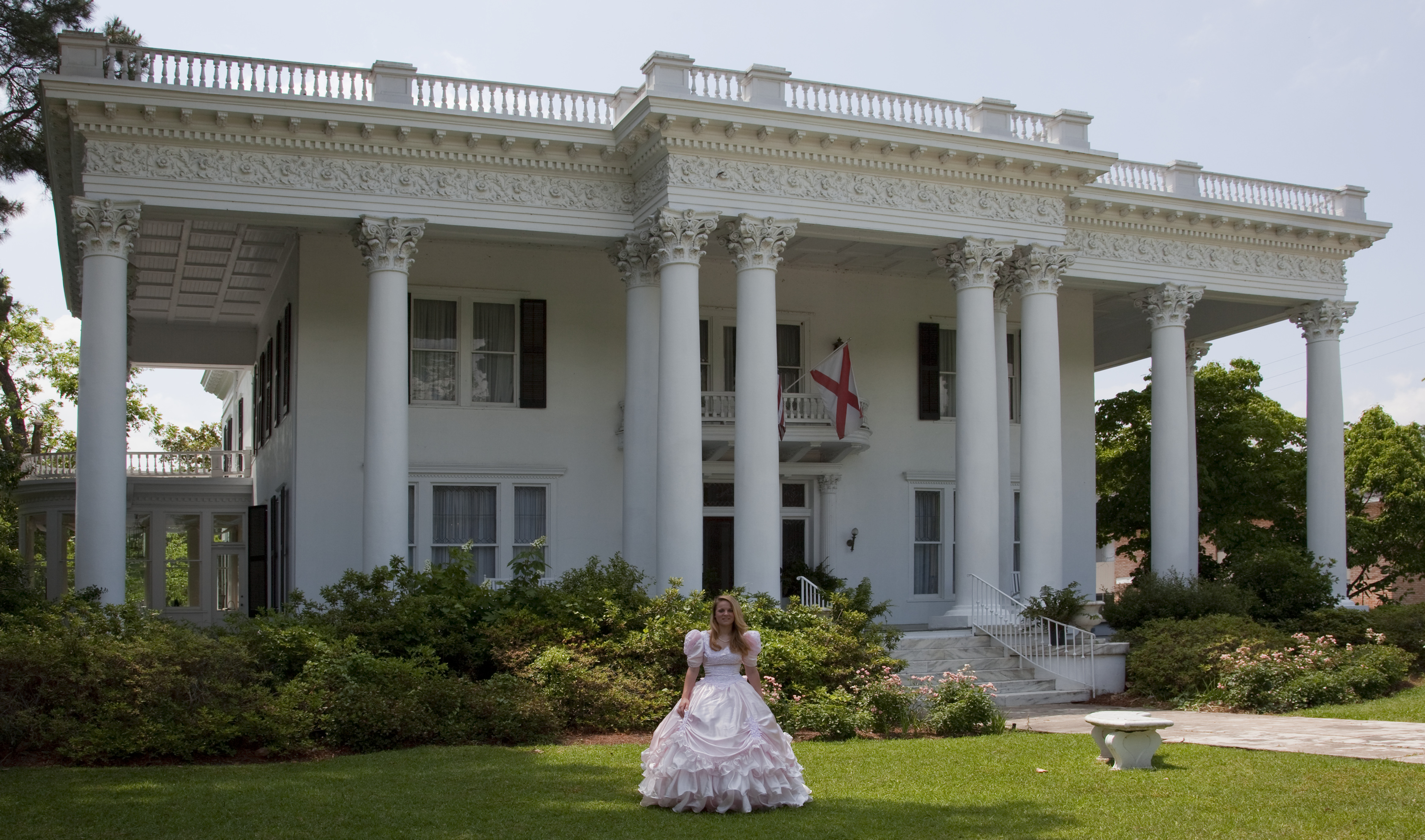
The Shorter Mansion was added to the National Register of Historic Places on January 14, 1972.

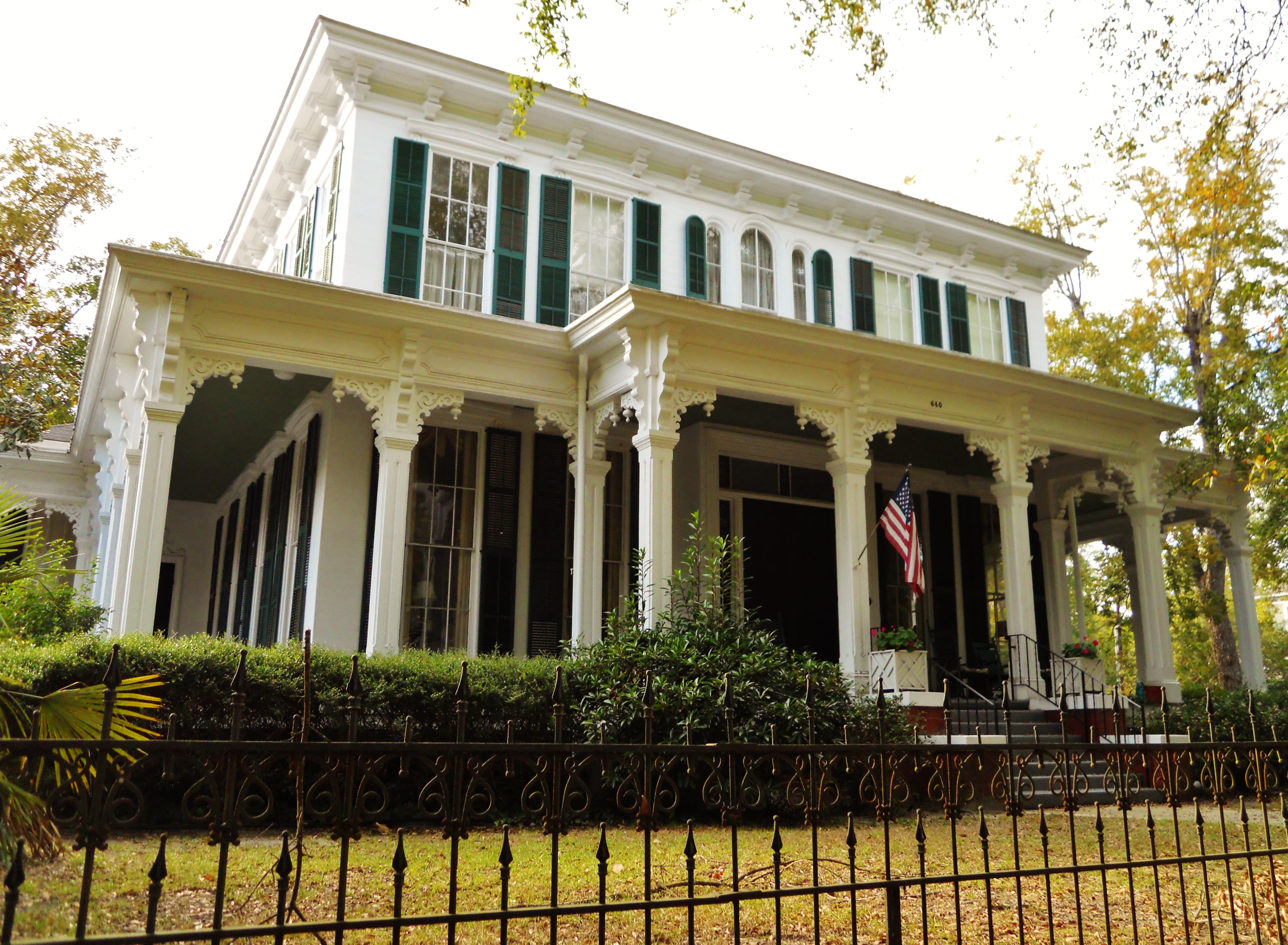
The Drewry-Mitchell-Moorer House was added to the National Register of Historic Places on April 13, 1972.

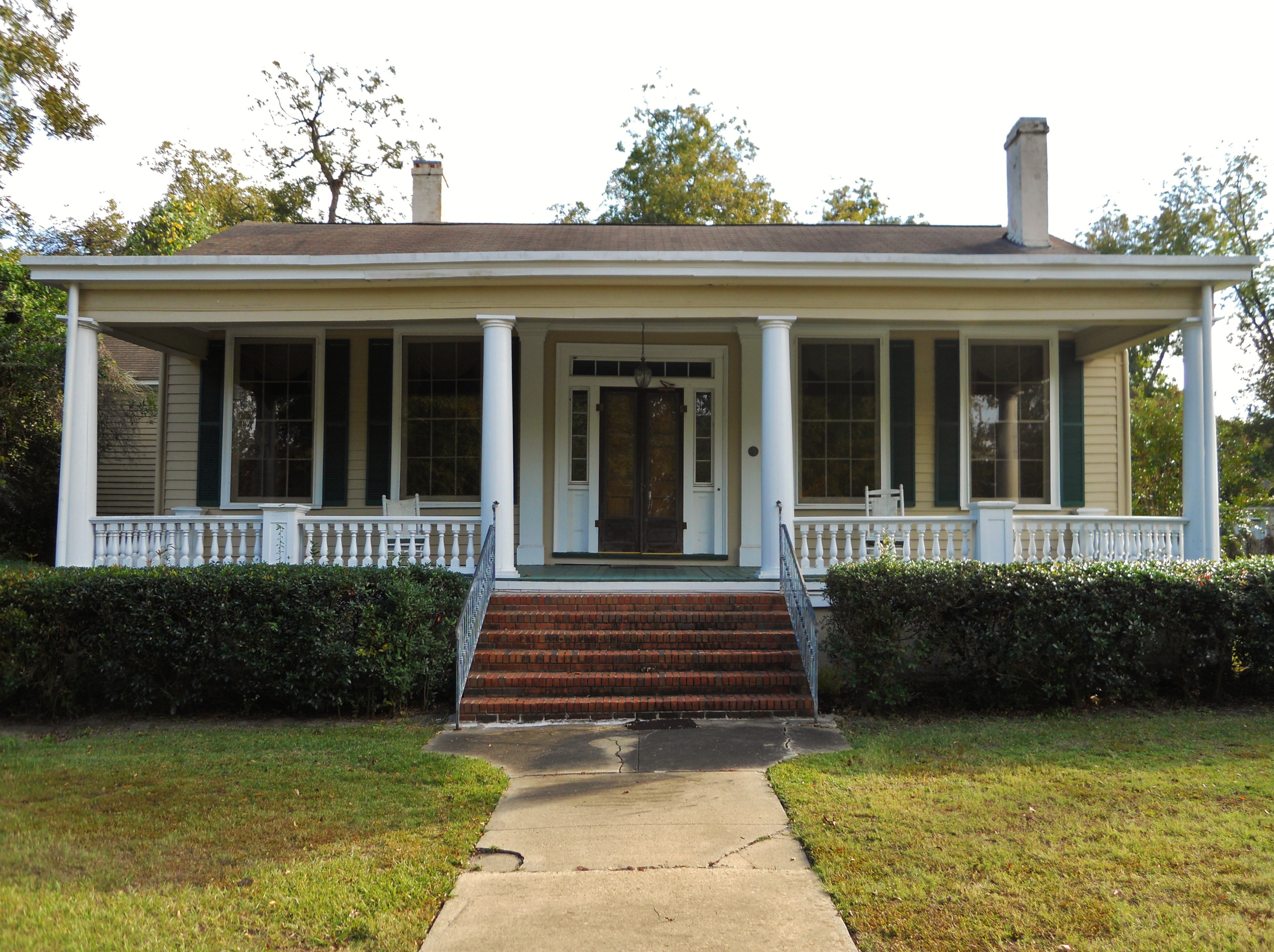
The Sparks-Irby House was the home of the 44th Alabama governor, Chauncey Sparks and his sister, Mrs. Louise Sparks Flewellen. It was added to the National Register of Historic Places on June 28, 1972.

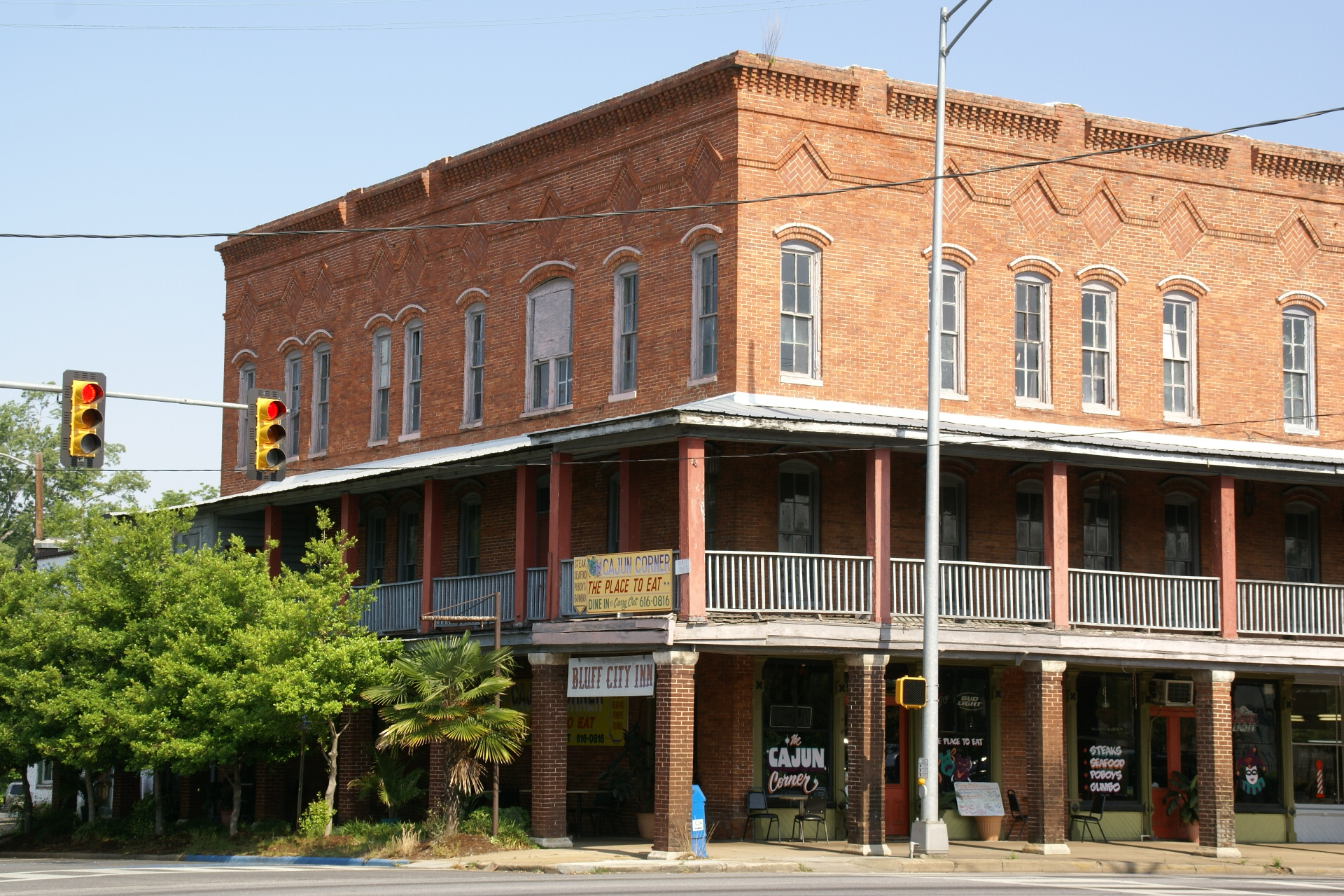
The Seth Lore and Irwinton Historic District was added to the National Register of Historic Places on December 12, 1973.

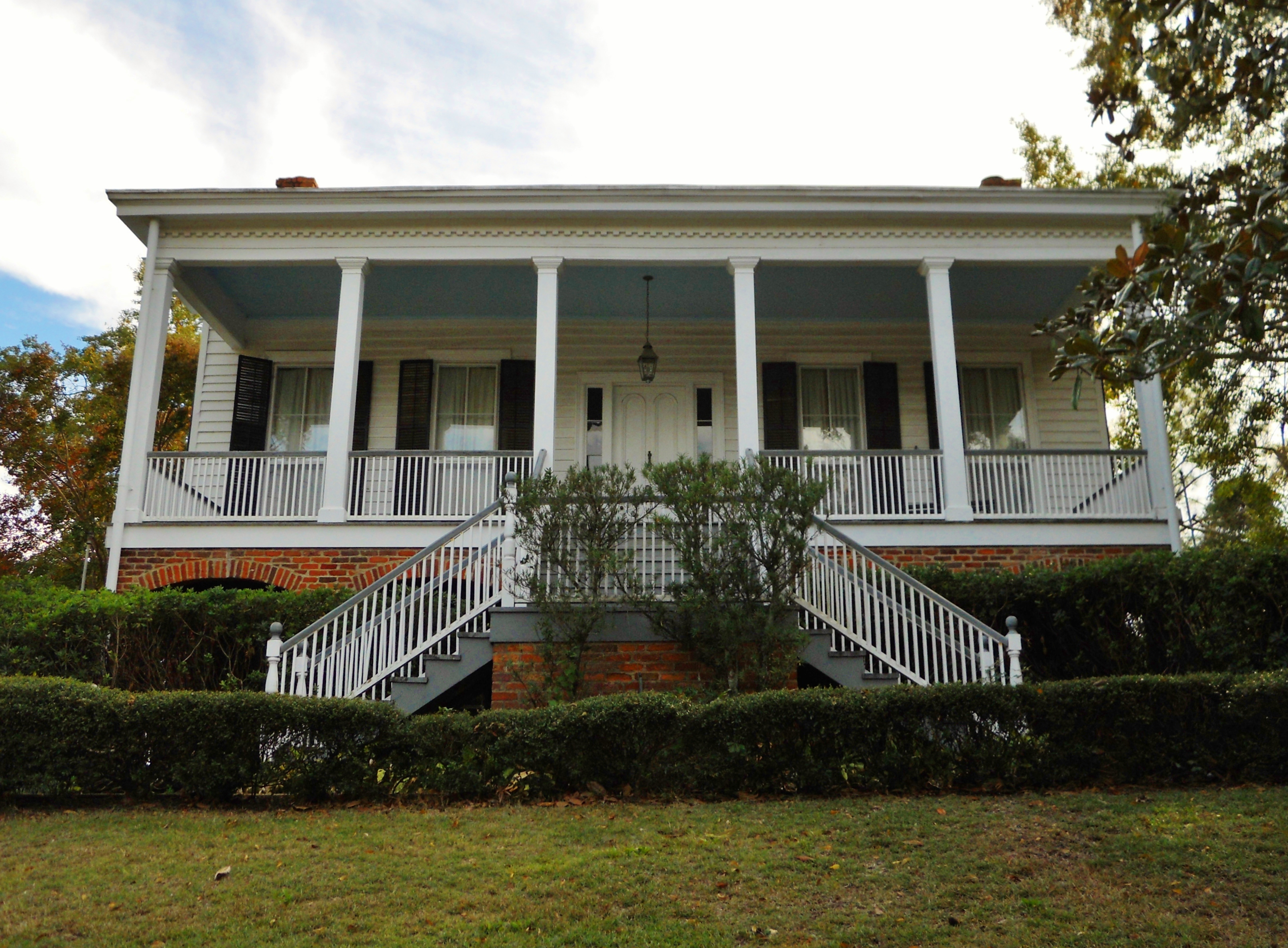
The Kiels-McNab House was added to the National Register of Historic Places on January 21, 1982.

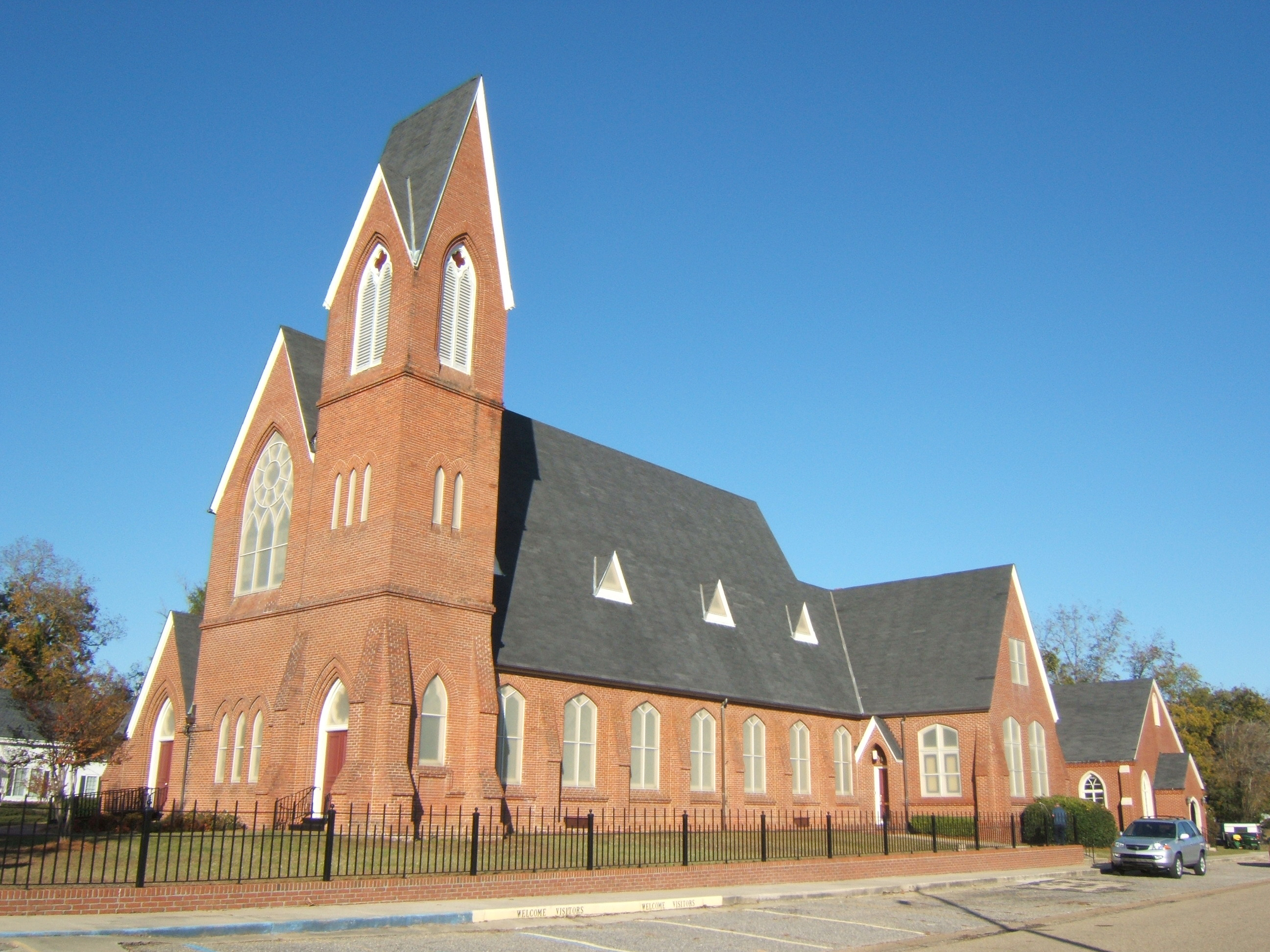
First Presbyterian Church, completed in 1869.

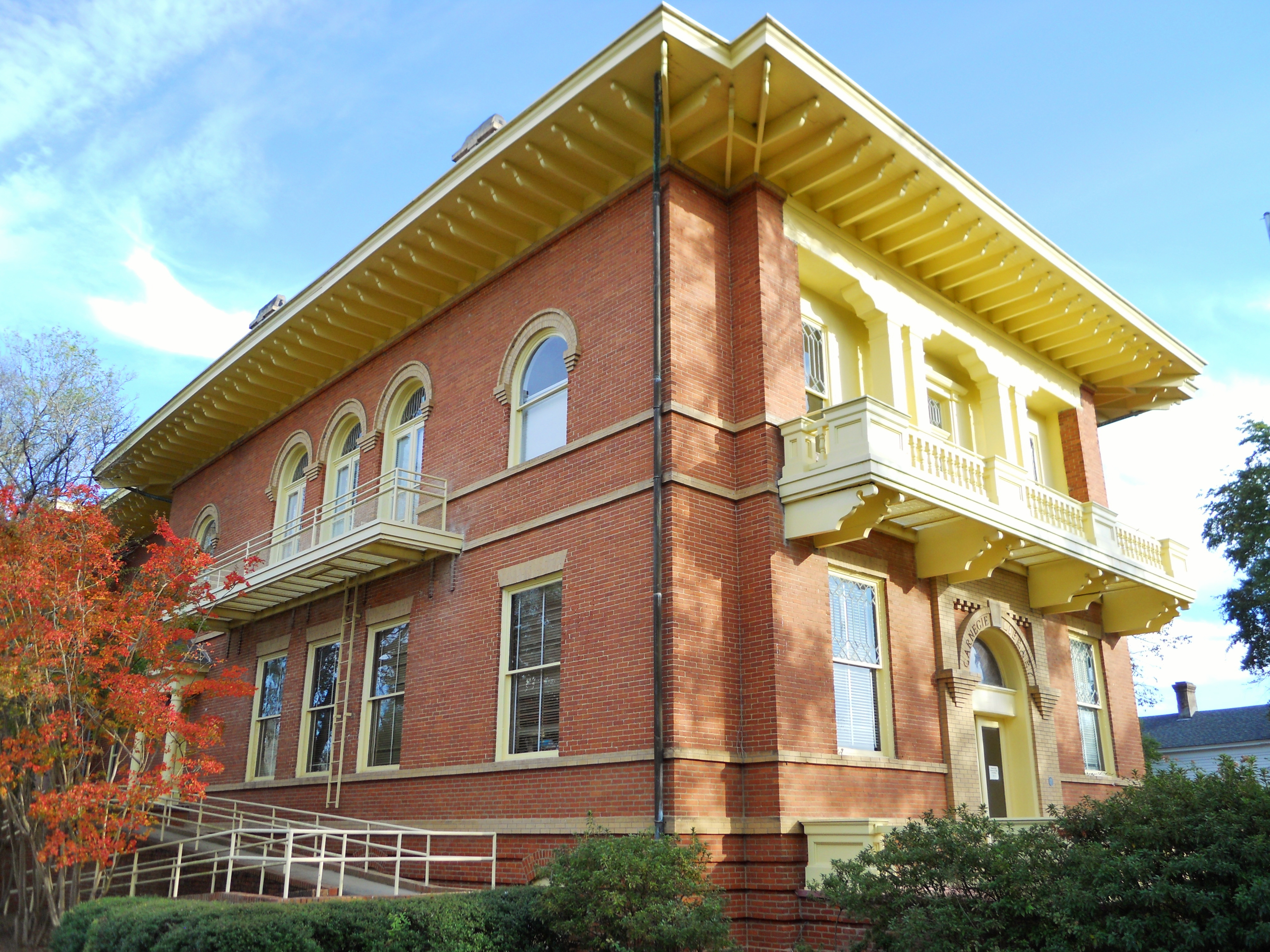
The Eufaula Carnegie Library, built in 1904.

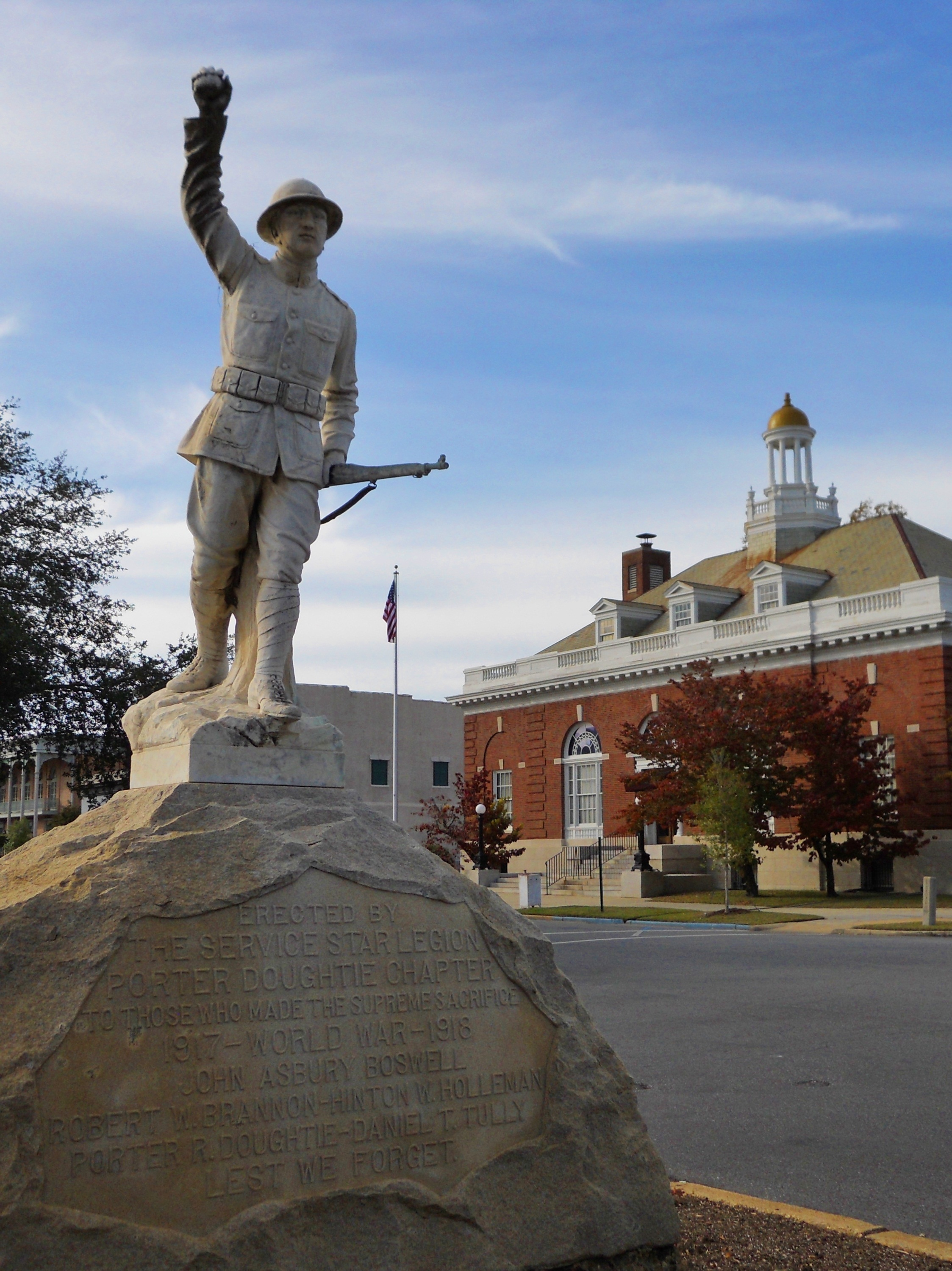
This statue of a WWI doughboy, with his arm outstretched, honors the men from Eufaula who perished in the war. It was erected and dedicated in 1920.

== Literature ==
- Alsobrook, David Ernest. Southside: Eufaula's Cotton Mill Village and its People, 1890-1945. Mercer University Press.
