= Cato House =

Historic house in Alabama, United States

- U.S. National Register of Historic Places
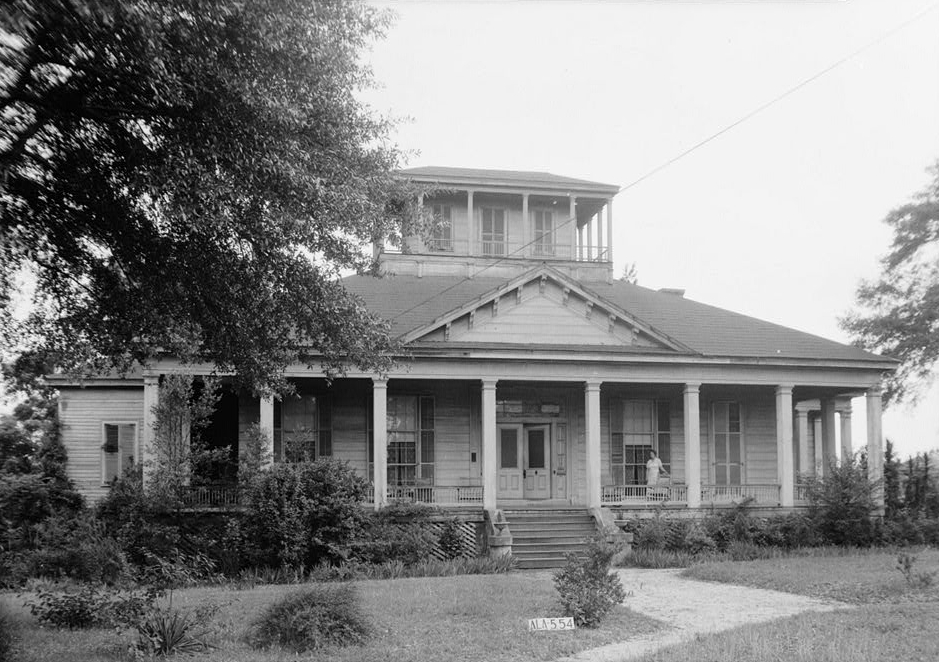
- The Cato House in 2008

- Location within Alabama Location within the United States
- Location: 823 W. Barbour St., Eufaula, Alabama
- Area: 0.1 acres (0.040 ha)
- Built: 1858
- NRHP reference No.: 71000094
- Added to NRHP: May 27, 1971

The Cato House was built in 1858 for Lewis Llewellen Cato in Eufaula, Alabama, United States. Cato was an attorney and a prominent secessionist. The one-story frame house was built by slave labor. The front of the house features a broad porch with a central pediment over the double front doors. A central hall leads to a dining room in the center of the house, flanked by parlors and the master bedroom. Another dining room and a bedroom are to the rear. The attic in the shallow-pitched pyramidal roof is surmounted by a small pavilion, itself surrounded by a small porch.

The Cato House was placed on the National Register of Historic Places on May 27, 1971.

== Background ==
The house was built on land bought from the Creek Indians and has been owned by the Cato family for the greater part of its existence. The first house owner, Lewis Llewellen Cato came to Barbour County, Alabama in 1837. He was a native of Hancock County, Georgia, and was a prominent citizen of Barbour during his life. He devoted himself assiduously to the law and became an able attorney, of very sound opinions. From 1861 to 1865, he represented the county in the senate with credit to his constituents and to himself. He died December 4, 1868.

The house is reputed to be the setting of the most influential secessionist meetings held in Alabama from 1858 to 1860. Here, a group of lawyers and politicians, including Alpheus Baker, Edward C. Bullock, Henry D. Clayton, John Gill Shorter, and James L. Pugh, among others, and known as the Eufaula Regency, assembled throughout the decade and gave strength to the effort of spawning the Southern Rights Clubs which flourished under the tutelage of William Lowndes Yancey. Lewis Llewellen Cato, an attorney, known in Alabama as "the great secessionist" was Yancey's friend and a prominent member of the Eufaula Regency.

The Cato Home was the scene of a great celebration when Alabama seceded from the Union. Lewy Dorman in his Party Politics in Alabama from 1850 through 1860 (1995) states, "The most advanced step looking toward secession came from the fire-eaters of Southeast Alabama under the leadership of the Eufaula Regency. It was composed of a strong Southern rights group, principally lawyers from Eufaula." He continues, "They were the most consistent secessionists in the State."

After the death of Lewis L. Cato, the house was sold to E. B. Young. In 1905, Dr. Julius Cato, a son of Lewis L. bought the house, and Miss Annie Cato, a granddaughter of Lewis L. lived there until 1997. The house is currently owned by Jeff Thorne.

The Cato House is one of the featured attractions of the so-called Eufaula Pilgrimage, an annual tour of the historically and architecturally significant houses organized by the Eufaula Heritage Association.
