= Shorter Mansion =

Historic house in Alabama, United States

- U.S. National Register of Historic Places
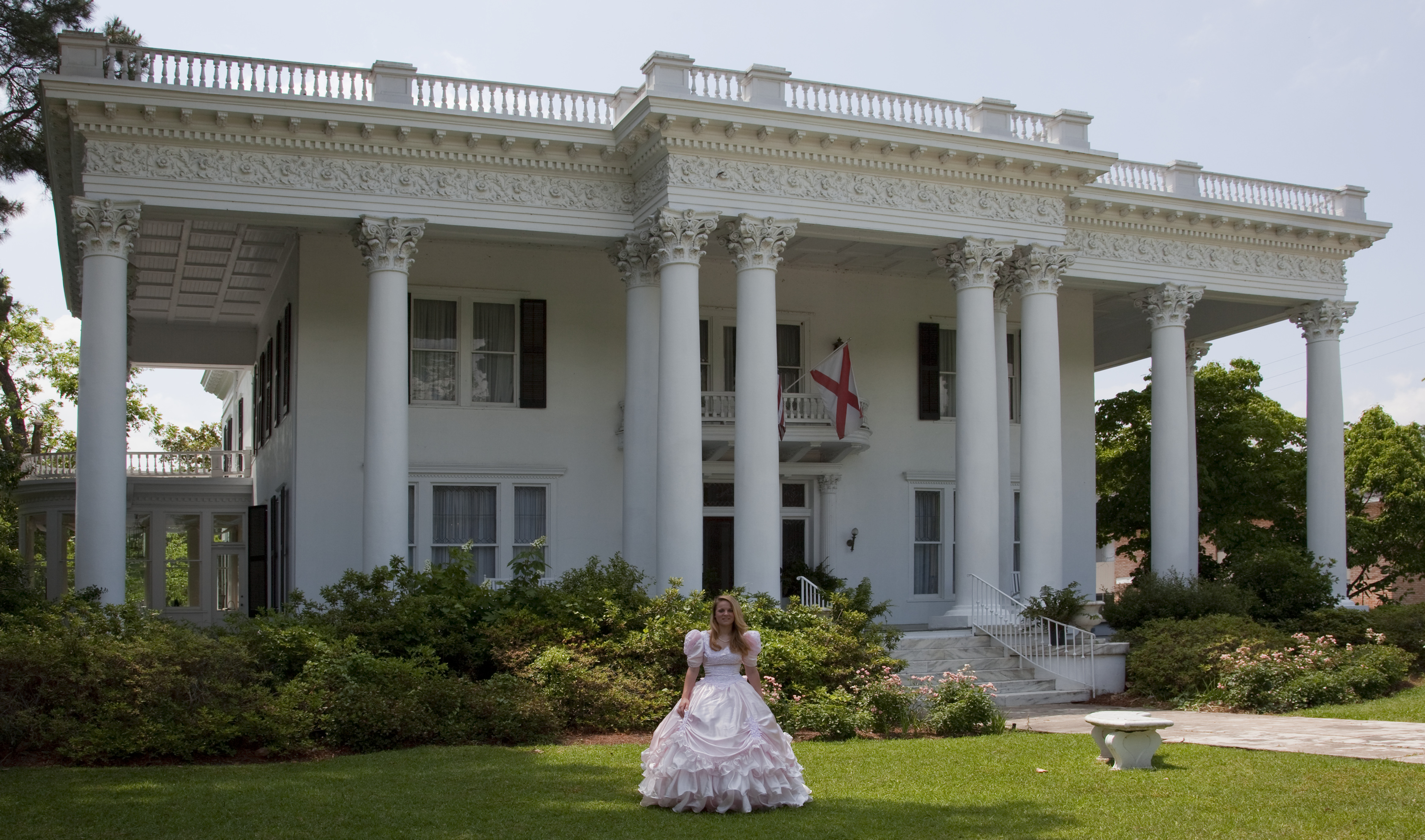
- The Shorter Mansion in 2010

- Location within Alabama Location within the United States
- Interactive map showing the location of Shorter Mansion
- Location: 340 N. Eufaula Ave., Eufaula, Alabama
- Coordinates: 31°53′46″N 85°8′46″W
- Built: 1884–1885, 1895, 1902–1906
- Architect: Charles A. Stevens, T. H. Adams, Jack McLeod
- Architectural style: Classical Revival
- NRHP reference No.: 72000156
- Added to NRHP: January 14, 1972

The Shorter Mansion is a Classical Revival-style historic house museum in Eufaula, Alabama, United States. The two-story masonry structure was originally built in 1884–1885 by Eli Sims Shorter II and his wife, Wileyna Lamar Shorter but burned in 1895. The house, was reconstructed by late 1895 by T. H. Adams with modifications done in 1902–1903 by architect C. A. Stevens of Eufaula. Then in 1906, architect Jack McLeod undertook significant interior and exterior renovations which resulted in the present day appearance of the former residence. Eli Sims Shorter died in 1908, but his wife resided in the house until 1927, when it was passed to their daughter, Fannie Shorter Upshaw. It was in turn inherited by Upshaw's daughter, Wileyna S. Kennedy, in 1959.

The Kennedy family moved away from the city and the house was purchased by the Eufaula Heritage Association, initially formed in order to buy and restore the house, at auction for $33,000 in 1965. The Eufaula Heritage Association organized the city's first pilgrimage in 1966 and became the primary historic preservation organization in Eufaula, a role it continues to fulfill to the present day. The Association offers tours of the Shorter Mansion year-round.

The mansion was added to the National Register of Historic Places on January 14, 1972.

== See also ==
- National Register of Historic Places listings in Barbour County, Alabama
