= The Tavern =

The Tavern may refer to:

- The Tavern (accessory), a 1983 role-playing game supplement
- The Tavern (Eufaula, Alabama), listed on the NRHP in Alabama
- The Tavern (Little Rock, Arkansas), listed on the NRHP in Arkansas
- The Tavern (film), a 2025 New Zealand comedy

== See also ==
- Tavern
