= Fendall Hall =

Historic house in Alabama, United States

- U.S. National Register of Historic Places
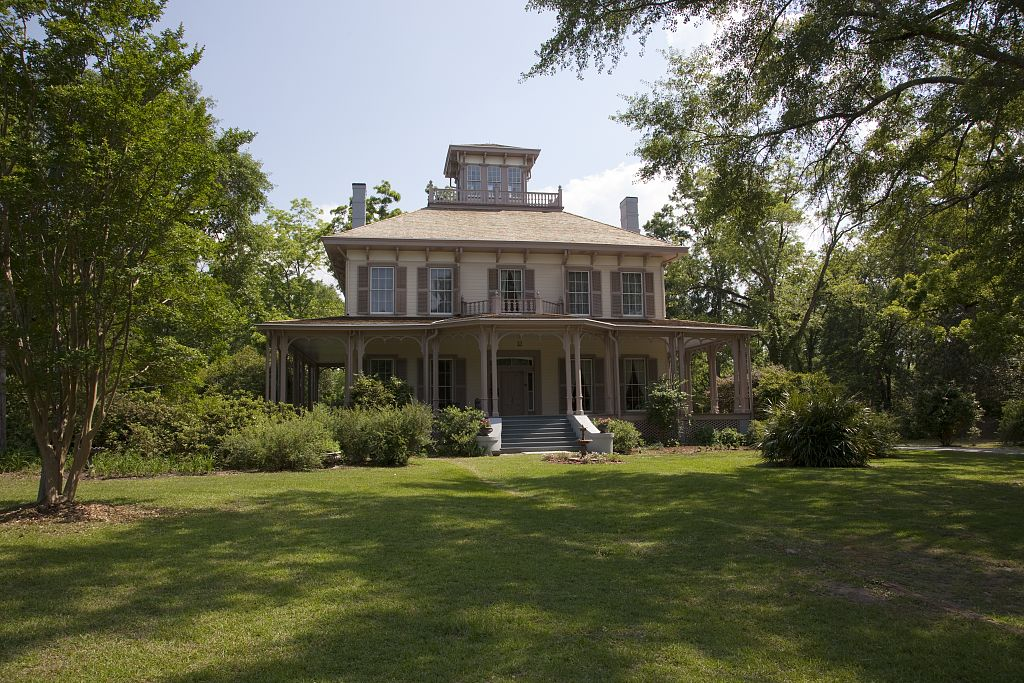
- Front facade of Fendall Hall in 2010

- Location within Alabama Location within the United States
- Location: Barbour St., Eufaula, Alabama
- Coordinates: 31°53′30″N 85°25′30″W
- Area: less than one acre
- Built: 1856–60
- Architect: Edward Brown Young
- Architectural style: Italianate
- NRHP reference No.: 70000097
- Added to NRHP: July 28, 1970

Fendall Hall, also known as the Young–Dent Home, is an Italianate-style historic house museum in Eufaula, Alabama, United States. The two-story wood-frame structure, with a symmetrical villa-type floor-plan and crowning cupola, was built between 1856 and 1860 by Edward Brown Young and his wife, Ann Fendall Beall. It remained in the Young family for five generations, passing to the builders’ daughter, Anna Beall Young, and her husband, Stouten Hubert Dent in 1879. It was added to the National Register of Historic Places on July 28, 1970. The Alabama Historical Commission acquired it in 1973 and restored it to an appearance appropriate to a time-frame spanning 1880–1916.

Edward Brown Young, a native of New York City, married Ann Fendall Beall of Warren County, Georgia. The couple moved to Eufaula in 1837, where he engaged in banking and entrepreneurial endeavors. Young is credited with sponsoring the change of the town name from Irwinton to its original Muscogee name, Eufaula.

== See also ==
- National Register of Historic Places listings in Barbour County, Alabama
