= 18th Alabama Infantry Regiment =

Infantry regiment of the Confederate States Army

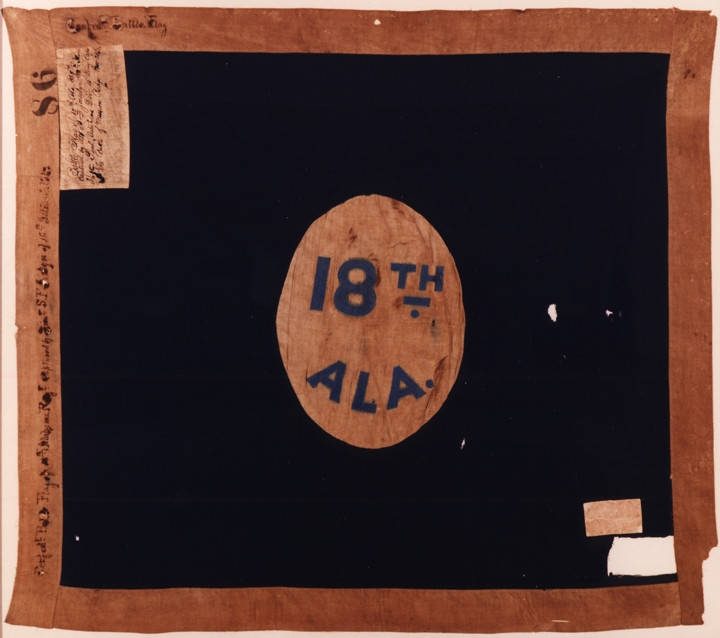
- One version of the 18th Regiment's battle flag was a variant of Hardee's moon flag, above
- Active: September 4, 1861, to May 4, 1865
- Country: Confederate States of America
- Allegiance: Confederate States
- Branch: Infantry
- Engagements: Battle of Shiloh; Battle of Chickamauga; Battle of Jonesboro; Battle of Franklin; Battle of Nashville

The 18th Alabama Infantry Regiment was an infantry regiment that served in the Confederate Army during the American Civil War.

== Service ==
The 18th Alabama Infantry Regiment was mustered in at Auburn, Alabama, on September 4, 1861.

The regiment surrendered at Meridian, Mississippi, on May 4, 1865.

== Commanders ==
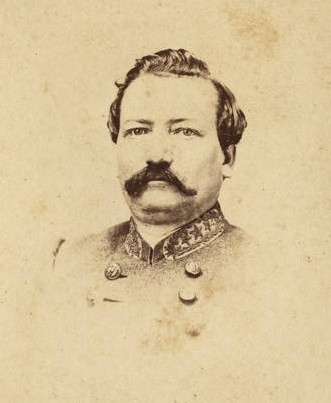
James Thadeus Holtzclaw

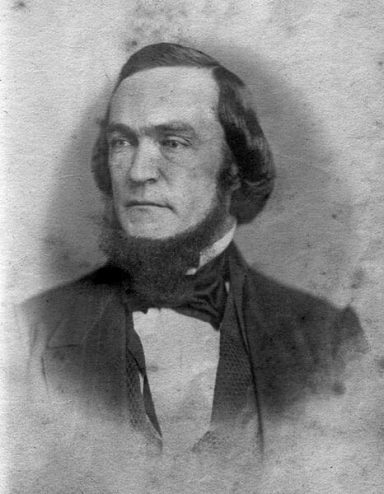
Eli Simms Shorter

- Colonel Edward Courtney Bullock
- Colonel James Thadeus Holtzclaw
- Colonel Eli Sims Shorter
- Colonel James Strawbridge (Confederate Officer)

== See also ==
- List of Confederate units from Alabama
