= Edward Bullock (American politician) =

American politician

Edward Courtenay Bullock (December 7, 1822 – December 23, 1861) was an American politician and Confederate officer in the American Civil War.

== Biography ==
Bullock, a native of South Carolina, came to Alabama shortly after graduating from Harvard College. He practiced law in the same firm with James L. Pugh and Jefferson Buford.

He served two terms as a member of the Alabama State Senate from Eufaula, Alabama, and was a strong supporter of secession. He delivered an address, A Plea for Home Education in the South, to the East Alabama Female College in July 1852 and another, True and False Civilization. An Oration Before the Erosophic and Philomathic Societies of the University of Alabama, in 1858. They illustrated the centrality of slavery to southern thought. He also spoke at the Florida secession convention in January 1861.

When the Civil War began, Bullock resigned his seat and was commissioned as a colonel with the 18th Alabama Infantry Regiment. He died in service during the war. Bullock County, Alabama, was named in his honor.
