= Eufaula First United Methodist Church =

Church in Alabama, United States

Coordinates: 31°53′28″N 85°8′43″W

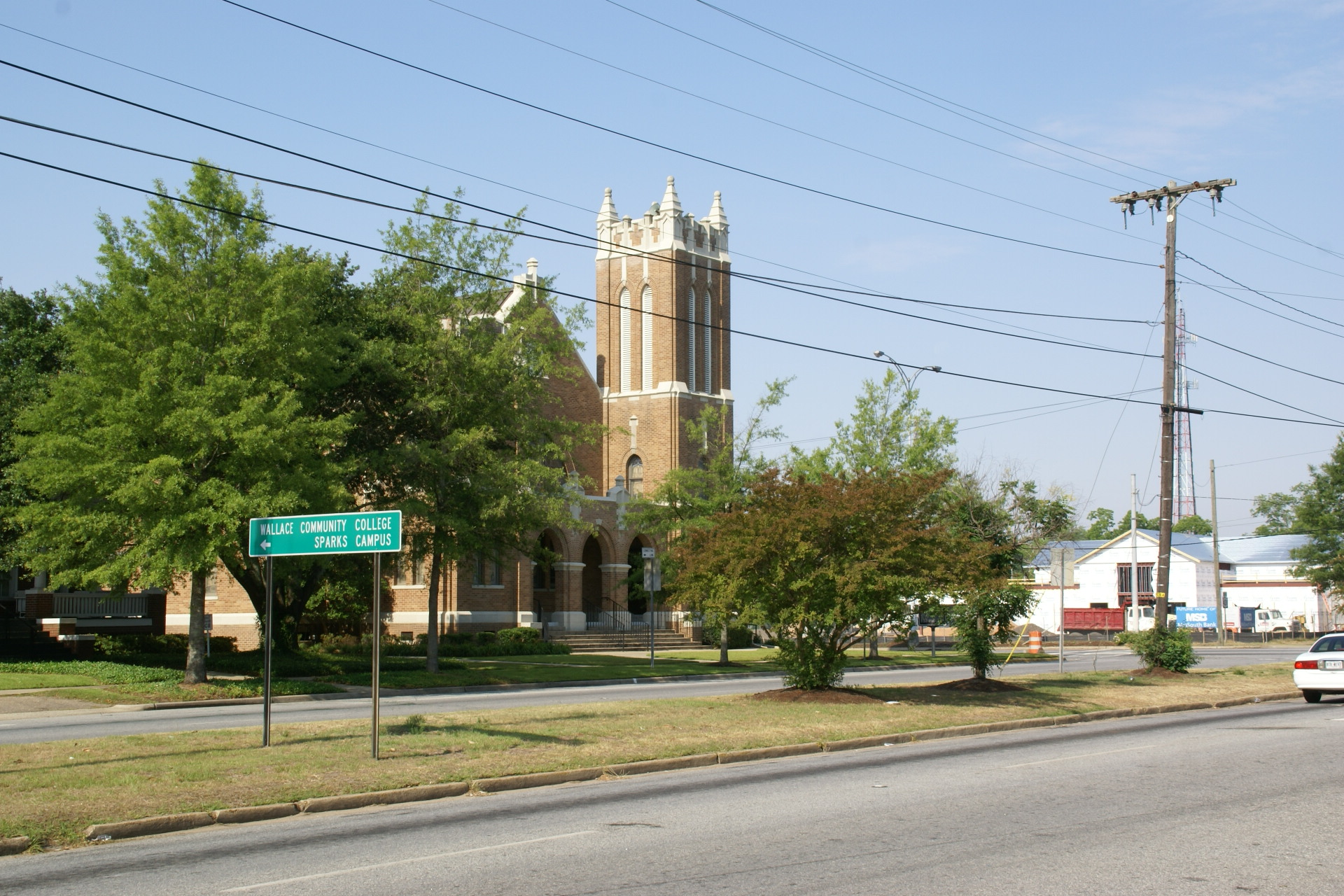
Eufaula First United Methodist Church

Eufaula First United Methodist Church is located in Eufaula, Alabama, U.S. The building is located at 101 East Barbour Street.

== Text of historical marker ==
The origins of this church date back to 1834 when Methodists, under the leadership of Jesse Burch and others, met to worship and formed a Sunday School. A frame Greek Revival edifice, at the corner of Livingston and Barbour Streets, was completed in 1838 and used until 1873 when it was sold to the Jewish congregation. In 1875 a new brick house of worship was built at the corner of Eufaula and Barbour Streets. It was razed in 1914 and the existing Gothic Revival church building was completed in 1917. The adjacent administration building, formerly the parsonage, was constructed in 1881.
