= Eufaula High School (Alabama) =

High school in Eufaula, Alabama, United States

Location
- 530 Lake Drive; Eufaula, Alabama 36027; United States; 31°55′9″N 85°8′20″W

Information
- Motto: "Expect Excellence"
- Founded: 1967 (59 years ago)
- School district: Eufaula City Schools
- CEEB code: 010995
- NCES School ID: 010141000511
- Principal: Emily Jackson
- Teaching staff: 42.50 (FTE)
- Grades: 9-12
- Enrollment: 728 (2024–2025)
- Student to teacher ratio: 17.13
- Colors: Red, black, and white
- Team name: Tigers
- Website: www.eufaulacityschools.org/ehs

Eufaula High School is a secondary school, grades 9 through 12, in Eufaula, Alabama, United States. A member of the Alabama High School Athletic Association (AHSAA), it plays in the 5A division for girls and boys athletics.

== History ==
Van Buren High School, eventually renamed for doctor Thomas Vivian McCoo, served Eufaula's African American students. Schools in Eufaula remained segregated by race until around 1970. After integration began the school stopped sponsoring social events such as proms although unofficial segregated events were still held. By 1990, students at Eufaula High had begun pressuring school officials to allow integrated proms. The first one was held on Saturday, May 18, 1991, without incident.

More than half the student body is African American and more than a third white.

== Alumni ==
- Gwen Jackson - Former WNBA player who played for the Phoenix Mercury
- Jerrel Jernigan - Former professional football player
- Siran Neal - Football Cornerback for the Miami Dolphins
- Yhonzae Pierre – college football linebacker for the Alabama Crimson Tide
- Walter Reeves - Former professional football player
- Les Snead - General Manager of the Los Angeles Rams
- Courtney Upshaw - Former professional football player
