= Port of Apalachicola =

Former seaport in Florida

Coordinates: 29°39′32″N 84°52′40″W

The Port of Apalachicola is a historic Gulf Coast port located on St. George Island in Franklin County, Florida. The Port of Apalachicola lies at the mouth of the Apalachicola River off Apalachicola Bay on the Intracoastal Waterway.

The Port of Apalachicola was of primary strategic importance during the United States Civil War. Union forces established a blockade of the port on 11 June 1861, with the USS Montgomery. At times, the blockade employed a squadron of three or more vessels in the area. On 3 April 1862, a landing at Apalachicola was achieved without resistance from the Confederacy.

The port continued to change hands repeatedly throughout the war, usually without serious conflict.
