= Eufaula City Schools =

School district in Alabama

Eufaula City School District is a school district in Barbour County, Alabama.

The District includes:

- Eufaula Primary School
- Eufaula Elementary School
- Admiral Moorer Middle School
- Eufaula High School
