= Alabama Historical Commission =

American historic preservation agency

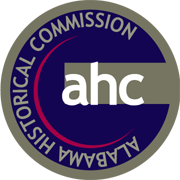
- Formation: 1966
- Type: Government organization
- Purpose: Historic preservation
- Headquarters: 468 South Perry Street; Montgomery, Alabama; United States
- Region served: Alabama
- Members: 20
- Executive Director: Lisa Jones
- Website: ahc.alabama.gov

The Alabama Historical Commission is the historic preservation agency for the U.S. state of Alabama. The agency was created by an act of the state legislature in 1966 with a mission of safeguarding Alabama's historic buildings and sites. It consists of twenty members appointed by the state governor or who serve in an official position. The members represent a broad cross section of Alabamians including architects, historians, archaeologists, and representatives of state universities. The commission is tasked with acquisition and preservation of historic properties and education of the public about historic sites in Alabama.

== Historic preservation ==
The commission, in cooperation with the Alabama Trust for Historic Preservation, publishes the annual report, Places in Peril, that details Alabama's most threatened historic resources. The commission also partners with the Alabama Preservation Alliance and the University of West Alabama to produce the Preservation Scoreboard, a publication that highlights specific landmark rescues and success stories, opportunities for rescue, and demolitions within the state.

The commission's executive director serves as Alabama's State Historic Preservation Officer and is responsible for nominating historic properties and sites for placement on the National Register of Historic Places and designation as National Historic Landmarks. The State Historic Preservation Officer carries out functions delegated to the state by the United States Department of the Interior.

The commission also maintains the Alabama Register of Landmarks and Heritage, which includes properties that the commission deems worthy of preservation. The Alabama Register includes properties ranging from cemeteries to reconstructed properties which would possibly not qualify for listing in the National Register of Historic Places. The commission owns, operates, or has custody of 26 historic properties located throughout Alabama. These include the Alabama State Capitol, Belle Mont, Bottle Creek Indian Mounds, Confederate Park, Fendall Hall, Fort Mims, Fort Morgan, Fort Toulouse, Freedom Rides Museum, Gaineswood, Magnolia Grove, Old Cahawba, and Pond Spring.

== Historical markers ==
In 1975, the commission began a historical marker program to inform the public about significant buildings, sites, structures, objects, cemeteries, and districts in the state. Individuals or organizations requesting a marker must have available funds to purchase it since the state provides no funds. In order for an individual or organization to receive a marker from the commission a property must be:

- listed individually in the National Register of Historic Places or the Alabama Register of Landmarks and Heritage.
- or be a contributing resource in a listed National Register or Alabama Register historic district
- or be listed in the Alabama Historic Cemetery Register.

== Digitization using Geographic Information System (GIS) ==
Historically, Commission maintained paper files which are accessible by visiting the AHC’s main office, but given uniqueness of these documents with mostly no backups, AHC has been diligently working to convert these paper files into a web-based system utilizing Geographic Information System (GIS) technology to improve public accessibility to this information and ensure the long-term preservation.
