= The Tavern (Eufaula, Alabama) =

Historic house in Alabama, United States

- U.S. National Register of Historic Places
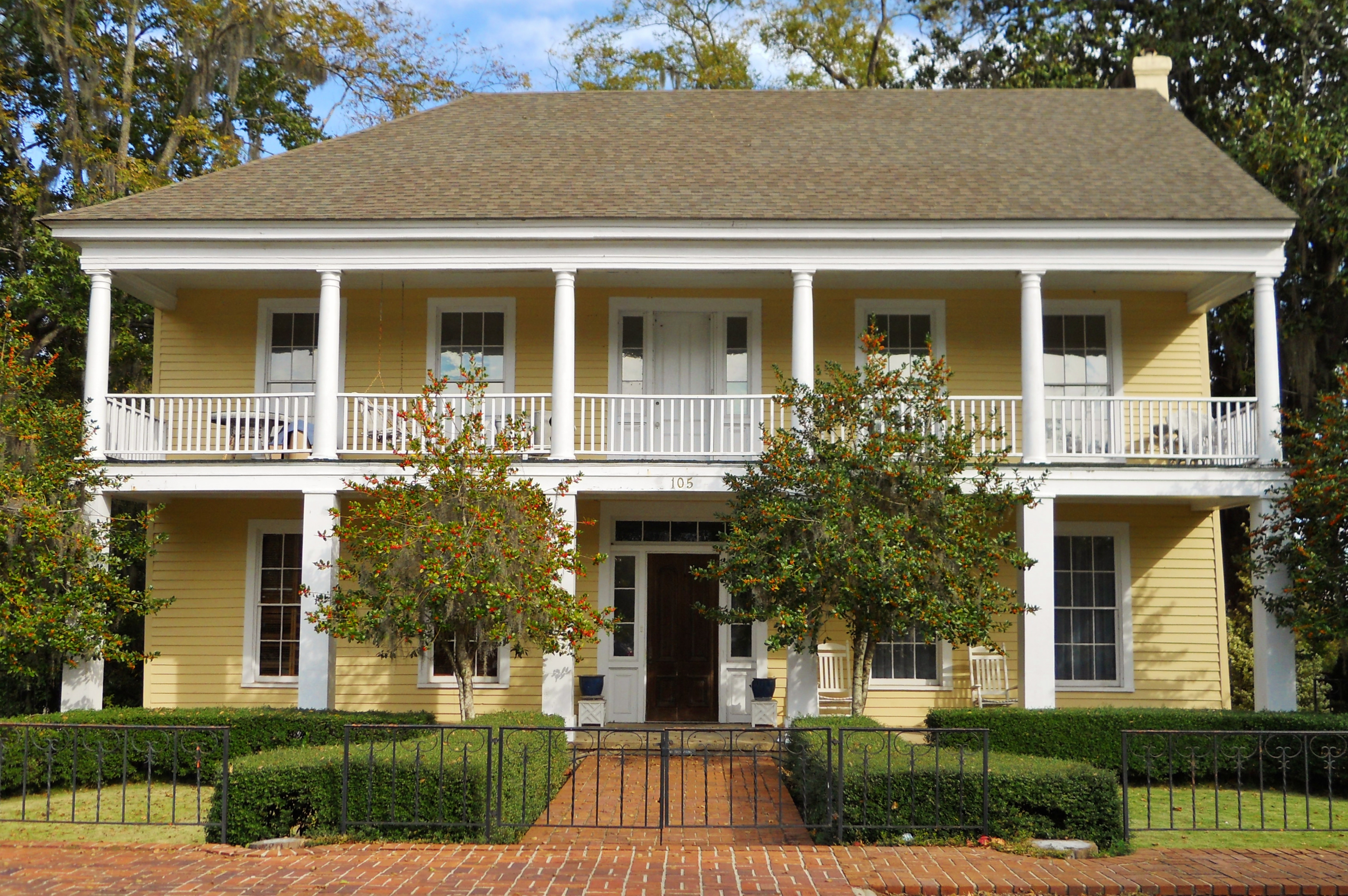

- Location within Alabama Location within the United States
- Location: 105 Riverside Dr., Eufaula, Alabama
- Coordinates: 31°53′30″N 85°8′30″W
- Built: 1836
- Architect: Edward Williams
- NRHP reference No.: 70000098
- Added to NRHP: October 06, 1970

The Tavern is located at 105 Riverside Dr. in Eufaula, Alabama, United States. It was designed by Edward Williams, and built in 1836. The Tavern was added to the National Register of Historic Places in 1970.
