= Eli S. Shorter =

American politician

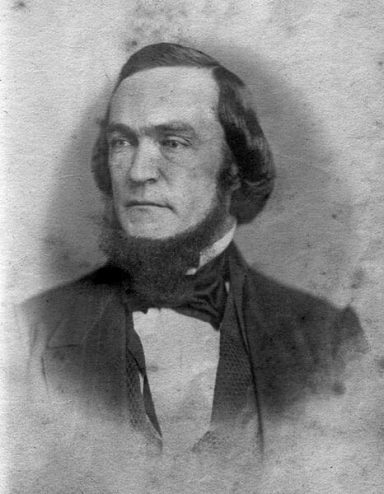
- Col. Eli Simms Shorter of the 18th Alabama Infantry

Member of the U.S. House of Representatives from Alabama's 2nd district
- In office March 4, 1855 – March 3, 1859
- Preceded by: James Abercrombie
- Succeeded by: James L. Pugh

Personal details
- Born: Eli Sims Shorter; March 15, 1823 Monticello, Georgia
- Died: April 29, 1879 (aged 56) Eufaula, Alabama
- Party: Democratic
- Occupation: Lawyer, Soldier, Politician

Military service
- Allegiance: Confederate States of America
- Branch/service: Confederate States Army
- Years of service: 1861–1865
- Rank: Colonel
- Commands: 18th Alabama Infantry Regiment
- Battles/wars: American Civil War

Eli Sims Shorter (March 15, 1823 – April 29, 1879) was a U.S. representative from Alabama.

Born in Monticello, Georgia, Shorter attended the common schools and graduated in law from Yale College in 1844. He was admitted to the bar and commenced practice in Eufaula, Alabama, in 1844. He also engaged in agricultural pursuits.

Shorter was elected as a Democrat to the Thirty-fourth and Thirty-fifth Congresses (March 4, 1855 – March 3, 1859). He resumed the practice of law in Eufaula, Alabama. During the Civil War, he served in the Confederate States Army as colonel of the 18th Regiment Alabama Infantry. He died in Eufaula, Alabama, April 29, 1879. He was interred in Fairview Cemetery.

U.S. House of Representatives
Preceded by James Abercrombie	Member of the U.S. House of Representatives from Alabama's 2nd congressional district March 4, 1855 – March 3, 1859	Succeeded by James L. Pugh
