= Alpheus Baker =

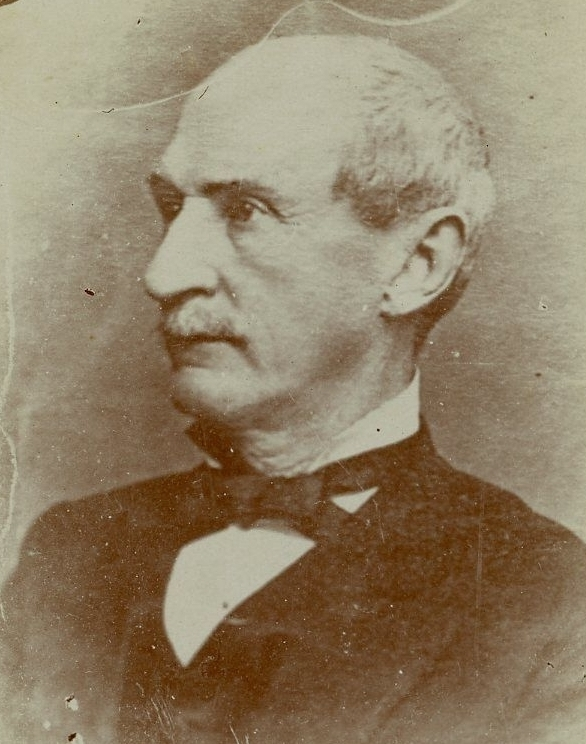
- Born: May 28, 1828; South Carolina, U.S.
- Died: October 21, 1891 (aged 63); Louisville, Kentucky, U.S.
- Burial place: Cave Hill Cemetery, Louisville, Kentucky, U.S.
- Military career
- Allegiance: Confederate States of America
- Branch: Confederate States Army
- Service years: 1861–1865
- Rank: Brigadier General
- Commands: 54th Alabama Infantry
- Conflicts: American Civil War; Battle of New Madrid; Battle of Vicksburg; Battle of Champion Hill; Battle of Ezra Church

Alpheus Baker (May 28, 1828 – October 21, 1891) was a brigadier general in the Confederate States Army during the American Civil War.

== Biography ==
Born in South Carolina, Baker was a schoolteacher and practiced law before moving to Alabama. Upon Alabama's secession from the Union, Baker enlisted as a captain in the Eufaula Rifles before being transferred to the 1st Alabama Infantry, where he was briefly stationed in Pensacola, Florida, before being sent to Tennessee in late 1861.

Being elected colonel by a mixed regiment of soldiers from Alabama, Mississippi, and Tennessee in 1862, his unit fought in the Battle of New Madrid, where he was subsequently taken prisoner. Released in a prisoner exchange within several months, Baker was given command of the 54th Alabama Infantry, which he would lead during the battles of Vicksburg and Champion's Hill, where he was seriously wounded. After his recovery, Baker assumed command of an Alabama brigade and promoted to brigadier general on March 5, 1864. Later participating in the Atlanta campaign, he was again wounded at the Battle of Ezra Church. Reassigned to the Department of the Gulf, Baker led his brigade in the defenses of Mobile but rejoined the Army of Tennessee for the Carolinas campaign in 1865.

According to his last wishes, Baker was buried among his soldiers at Cave Hill Cemetery in Louisville, Kentucky, upon his death. An empty space was reserved in his honor among the burials of Confederate prisoners-of-war who were held in the Louisville Prison Camp.

== See also ==
- List of American Civil War Generals (Confederate)
