= James L. Pugh =

Democratic U.S. Senator from Alabama; member of the Confederate Congress

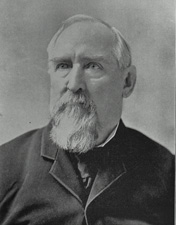

United States Senator from Alabama
- In office November 24, 1880 – March 3, 1897
- Preceded by: Luke Pryor
- Succeeded by: Edmund Pettus

Member of the U.S. House of Representatives from Alabama's 2nd district
- In office March 4, 1859 – January 21, 1861
- Preceded by: Eli Sims Shorter
- Succeeded by: Charles Waldron Buckley

Personal details
- Born: December 12, 1820 Burke County, Georgia
- Died: March 9, 1907 (aged 86) Washington, D.C.
- Party: Democratic

James Lawrence Pugh (December 12, 1820 – March 9, 1907) was an American politician and attorney who was a U.S. senator from Alabama from 1880 to 1897, as well as a member of the Confederate Congress during the American Civil War.

== Biography ==
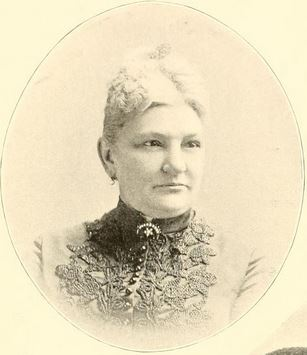
Mrs James L. Pugh

Pugh was born in Burke County, Georgia, and moved to Alabama in 1824. He received a collegiate education, studied law under John Gill Shorter, and was admitted to the bar in 1841. He began to practise in Eufaula, Alabama. He was a presidential elector in 1848 and 1856. He represented Alabama's second district as a Democrat in the United States House of Representatives from December 5, 1859, until January 21, 1861, when he retired upon the secession of his state.

He then served as an officer in the Confederate States Army. He was subsequently elected to be the representative from Alabama's 8th District to both the First Confederate Congress and the Second Confederate Congress, serving from February 22, 1862, until the surrender in 1865. Pugh served on the House Committee on Military Affairs throughout both Congresses, where he was a prominent critic of C.S. President Jefferson Davis.

Following the war, he returned to his law practice. Upon the restoration of his citizenship, Pugh was president of the Democratic state convention of 1874, a delegate to the 1875 state constitutional convention, and a presidential elector again in 1876. He was elected to fill the term left by the death of George S. Houston, and was reelected twice, serving in the Senate from November 24, 1880, to March 4, 1897. He lost renomination.

== Notes ==
U.S. House of Representatives
| Preceded by Eli Sims Shorter | Member of the U.S. House of Representatives from Alabama's 2nd congressional district 1859 – 1861 | Succeeded by Charles Waldron Buckley |
U.S. Senate
| Preceded by Luke Pryor | U.S. senator (Class 3) from Alabama; 1880 – 1897; Served alongside: John Tyler Morgan | Succeeded by Edmund Pettus |
