= Civil War Discovery Trail =

Heritage tourism program

The Civil War Trust's Civil War Discovery Trail is a heritage tourism program that links more than 600 historic sites related to the American Civil War (1861–1865) in more than 30 states. The program is one of the White House Millennium Council's sixteen flagship National Millennium Trails. Sites on the trail include battlefields, museums, memorials, forts and cemeteries, among many other places of historical interest.

In May 2018, the Civil War Trust, along with the Revolutionary War Trust, changed operational structure to function as land preservation divisions of the American Battlefield Trust. The places of the formerly named trail are highlighted on the American Battlefield Trust's website as heritage sites. The following is a list of these sites as of March 2014.

== Sites ==
=== Alabama ===
- Alabama Department of Archives and History
- Alabama State Capitol
- Belle Mont Mansion
- Bridgeport Depot Museum
- Brierfield Ironworks Historical State Park
- Confederate Memorial Park
- Cornwall Furnace
- Fendall Hall
- First White House of the Confederacy
- Fort Gaines Historic Site
- Fort Morgan Historic Site
- Historic Blakeley State Park
- Janney Furnace Park
- Old Cahawba Archaeological Park
- Old Depot Museum
- Old Live Oak Cemetery
- Old State Bank and Civil War Walking Tour
- Pond Spring
- Selma Historic District
- Shorter Cemetery
- Tannehill Ironworks Historical State Park
- Vaughan-Smitherman Museum

=== Arkansas ===
- Arkansas Post National Memorial
- Battery C Park
- Buffalo National River, Tyler Bend Visitors Center
- Camp Nelson Confederate Cemetery
- Camp White Sulphur Springs Confederate Cemetery
- Chalk Bluff Park
- City of Clarendon
- Delta Cultural Center
- Ditch Bayou Battlefield
- Fort Smith Museum of History
- Fort Smith National Cemetery
- Fort Smith National Historic Site
- Fort Southerland Park
- Headquarters House Museum
- Helena Confederate Cemetery
- Helena, Arkansas, Civil War Sites Driving Tour
- Historic Washington State Park
- Jacksonport State Park
- Jenkins' Ferry State Park
- Lake Chicot State Park
- Little Rock Campaign Driving Tour
- Little Rock National Cemetery
- MacArthur Museum of Arkansas Military History
- Marks' Mills Battlefield State Park
- Massard Prairie Battlefield Park
- McCollum-Chidester House Museum
- Mount Elba Battlefield
- Mount Holly Cemetery
- Old State House Museum
- Pea Ridge National Military Park
- Poison Springs Battleground State Park
- Prairie Grove Battlefield State Park
- Reed's Bridge Battlefield
- Skirmish at Jonesboro, Arkansas
- Southern Memorial Association
- St. Charles Museum
- White Oak Lake State Park

=== California ===
- Drum Barracks Civil War Museum
- Fort Point
- Golden Gate National Recreation Area (Alcatraz Island)
- Presidio of San Francisco

=== Connecticut ===
- General Mansfield House

=== Delaware ===
- Fort Delaware State Park

=== District of Columbia ===
- African American Civil War Memorial Museum
- Church of the Epiphany
- Civil War Defenses of Washington
- Civil War to Civil Rights: Downtown Heritage Trail
- Ford's Theatre National Historic Site
- Frederick Douglass National Historic Site
- Lincoln Memorial
- National Building Museum
- New York Avenue Presbyterian Church
- President Lincoln's Cottage
- The Navy Museum and the Washington Navy Yards
- Ulysses S. Grant Memorial
- United States Soldiers' and Airmen's Home National Cemetery

=== Florida ===
- Camp Milton Historic Preserve
- Castillo de San Marcos National Monument
- Fort Barrancas, Gulf Islands National Seashore
- Fort Clinch State Park
- Fort East Martello Museum and Gardens
- Fort Jefferson, Dry Tortugas National Park
- Fort Pickens, Gulf Islands National Seashore
- Fort Ward, San Marcos de Apalache Historic State Park
- Fort Zachary Taylor Historic State Park
- Gamble Plantation Historic State Park
- Jupiter Inlet Lighthouse
- Knott House Museum
- Museum of Florida History
- Museum of Science and History
- Museum of Southern History
- Natural Bridge Battlefield Historic State Park
- Olustee Battlefield Historic State Park
- Segui-Kirby Smith House
- St. Marks Lighthouse, St. Marks National Wildlife Refuge
- Wardlaw-Smith-Goza Conference Center
- Yulee Sugar Mill Ruins Historic State Park

=== Georgia ===
- Alexander H. Stephens State Historic Park
- Andersonville National Historic Site
- Atlanta Campaign Pavilion Parks
- Atlanta Cyclorama & Civil War Museum
- Atlanta History Center
- Augusta Museum of History
- Blue and Gray Museum
- Blue and Gray Trail
- Bulloch Hall
- Cannonball House and Museum
- Chickamauga and Chattanooga National Military Park / Chickamauga Battlefield
- Dalton Confederate Cemetery
- Fort James Jackson
- Fort McAllister Historic State Park
- Fort Pulaski National Monument
- Fort Tyler
- Georgia State Capitol
- Stone Mountain Park
- Gordon-Lee Mansion
- Green–Meldrim House
- Griswoldville Battlefield & Monument
- Historic Oakland Cemetery
- Kennesaw Mountain National Battlefield Park
- Magnolia Springs State Park
- Male Academy Museum
- Marietta National Cemetery
- Nash Farm Battlefield
- National Civil War Naval Museum at Port Columbus
- Pickett's Mill Battlefield State Historic Site
- Prater's Mill
- Resaca Confederate Cemetery
- Robert Toombs House State Historic Site
- Savannah History Museum
- Southern Museum of Civil War and Locomotive History
- Sweetwater Creek State Park
- The Old Governor's Mansion
- Tunnel Hill Heritage Center and Clisby Austin House
- Washington Historical Museum
- Western and Atlantic Passenger Depot

=== Illinois ===
- Abraham Lincoln Presidential Library and Museum
- Alton Military Prison Site
- Bureau County Historical Society Museum
- Cairo Public Library
- Camp Butler National Cemetery
- Customs House
- Daughters of Union Veterans of the Civil War, 1861–1865
- David Davis Mansion State Historic Site
- General John A. Logan Museum
- Grand Army of the Republic Memorial Museum
- Lincoln Home National Historic Site
- Lincoln Tomb, Oak Ridge Cemetery
- Mound City National Cemetery
- Museum of Funeral Customs
- Old State Capitol State Historic Site
- Rock Island Arsenal Museum and Rock Island Arsenal
- Rosehill Cemetery and Civil War Museum
- St. Charles Heritage Center and Camp Kane
- Thomas Lincoln Cemetery
- Ulysses S. Grant Home State Historic Site

=== Indiana ===
- Corydon Battlefield
- General Lew Wallace Study and Museum
- Historic Eleutherian College
- John Hunt Morgan Heritage Trail
- Lincoln Amphitheater and Lincoln State Park
- Lincoln Boyhood National Memorial

=== International ===
- E.D. White Historic Site
- La Cite De La Mer
- Scottish-American Soldiers Monument (Edinburgh, Scotland)
- The Globe Hotel and Bermuda National Trust Museum (Bermuda)
- Wirral Maritime Heritage Trail

=== Kansas ===
- Baxter Springs Heritage Center and Museum
- Fort Scott National Cemetery
- Fort Scott National Historic Site
- Mine Creek Battlefield State Historic Site
- Territorial Capital Museum
- U.S. Cavalry Museum

=== Kentucky ===
- Abraham Lincoln Birthplace National Historical Park
- Ashland: The Henry Clay Estate
- Richmond Battlefield
- Battle of Sacramento Driving Tour
- Behringer-Crawford Museum
- Camp Nelson
- Camp Wildcat Civil War Battlefield
- Cave Hill Cemetery and Arboretum
- Civil War Driving Tour of Bowling Green and Warren County
- Columbus-Belmont State Park
- Cumberland Gap National Historical Park
- Downtown Paducah Civil War Walking Tour
- Farmington Historic Plantation
- Fort Duffield Park and Historic Site
- Fort Smith
- Frankfort Cemetery
- General John Hunt Morgan's Brandenburg Raid
- Green Hill Cemetery
- Hardin County History Museum
- Hart County Historical Society Museum
- Historic Homes and Landmarks Tour of Lebanon
- Hunt–Morgan House
- Ivy Mountain Battlefield
- Jefferson Davis Memorial Historic Site
- Jefferson Davis Monument State Historic Site
- Kentucky Gateway Museum Center
- Kentucky Military History Museum
- Kentucky State Capitol
- Leslie Morris Park at Fort Hill
- Lexington Cemetery
- Mary Todd Lincoln House
- Middle Creek National Battlefield
- Mill Springs Battlefield National Monument
- Morgan's Raids at Cynthiana
- Mountain Homeplace
- Munfordville Battlefield
- Octagon Hall Museum/Kentucky Confederate Studies Archive
- Old Bardstown Village Civil War Museum
- Old Fort Harrod State Park
- Old Washington
- Perryville Battlefield Preservation Association
- Perryville Battlefield State Historic Site
- Pewee Valley Confederate Cemetery and Memorial
- Riverview at Hobson Grove
- Shaker Museum at South Union
- Simpson County Archives and Museum (old Simpson County Jail And Jailer's Residence)
- Spalding Hall
- Tebbs Bend - Green River Bridge Battlefield
- Samuel May House Living History Museum
- The Shaker Village of Pleasant Hill
- Town of Perryville
- Waveland State Historic Site
- White Hall State Historic House
- Zollicoffer Park

=== Louisiana ===
- Academy of the Sacred Heart
- Baton Rouge Museum
- Camp Moore/Confederate Museum and Cemetery
- Centenary State Historic Site and Jackson Confederate Cemetery
- Chretien Point Plantation
- Clinton Confederate State Cemetery
- Confederate Museum
- Fort DeRussy State Historic Site
- Fort Jackson
- Fort Pike State Historic Site
- Frogmore Cotton Plantation and Gins
- Grant's Canal, Byerley House
- Herbert S. Ford Memorial Museum
- Kent Plantation
- Louisiana State Museum Capitol Park
- Mansfield State Historic Site
- Niblett's Bluff Park
- Nottoway Plantation
- Old Arsenal Museum
- Old U.S. Mint
- Pentagon Barracks
- Port Hudson State Historic Site
- Rene Beauregard House—Jean Lafitte National Historical Park and Preserve
- Shadows-on-the-Teche
- Snyder Museum
- The Cabildo
- Winter Quarters State Historic Site

=== Maine ===
- Fifth Maine Regimental Museum
- Fort Knox State Historic Site
- Joshua L. Chamberlain Museum

=== Maryland ===
- Antietam National Battlefield
- B&O Railroad Museum
- Baltimore & Ohio Ellicott City Station Museum
- Baltimore Civil War Museum
- Barbara Fritchie House and Museum
- Camden Station
- Chesapeake and Ohio Canal National Historical Park
- Clara Barton National Historic Site
- Dr. Samuel A. Mudd Home and Museum
- Fort Foote Park
- Fort Frederick State Park
- Fort McHenry National Monument and Historic Shrine
- Fort Washington Park
- Historic Ships in Baltimore
- Kennedy Farmhouse
- Marietta House Museum
- Maryland Historical Society
- Monocacy National Battlefield
- Montgomery County Historical Society
- Mount Olivet Cemetery
- National Museum of Civil War Medicine
- National Museum of Health and Medicine
- Point Lookout State Park and Civil War Museum
- Pry House Field Hospital Museum
- South Mountain State Battlefield
- Surratt House Museum
- Thomas Viaduct

=== Massachusetts ===
- Boston African American National Historic Site
- Clara Barton Birthplace

=== Minnesota ===
- Birch Coulee Battlefield State Historic Site
- Fort Ridgely State Historic Site
- Historic Fort Snelling

=== Mississippi ===
- Battery F
- Battery Robinett
- Beauvoir: The Jefferson Davis Home and Presidential Library
- Brice's Crossroads Battlefield Visitor and Interpretive Center
- Campaign of 1862- Driving Tour of Corinth Campaign
- Confederate Cemetery
- Corinth Civil War Interpretive Center
- Corinth Contraband Camp
- Corinth National Cemetery
- Crossroads Museum
- Driving Tour of Historic Raymond
- Fort Massachusetts on West Ship Island
- Fort Pemberton
- Friendship Cemetery
- Grand Gulf Military Monument Park
- Grenada Lake
- Longwood
- Manship House Museum
- Marshall County Historical Museum
- Melrose
- Mississippi Governor's Mansion
- Natchez National Cemetery
- Old Capitol Museum of Mississippi History
- Old Court House Museum and Eva W. Davis Memorial
- Port Gibson Battlefield
- Rail Crossing-Trailhead Park
- Raymond Battlefield
- Raymond Courthouse
- Rosemont Plantation/ Home of Jefferson Davis
- St. Mark's Episcopal Church
- The Beauregard Line
- The Oaks House Museum
- The Verandah-Curlee House
- The William Johnson House
- Tupelo National Battlefield
- Vicksburg Battlefield Museum
- Vicksburg National Military Park
- Waverley Plantation Mansion
- Windsor Ruins

=== Missouri ===
- Battle of Athens State Historic Site
- Battle of Carthage Civil War Museum
- Battle of Carthage State Historic Site
- Battle of Lexington State Historic Site
- Battle of Springfield
- Battle Of Westport
- Bellefontaine Cemetery
- Bushwhacker Museum
- Calvary Cemetery
- Confederate Memorial State Historic Site
- Forest Hill Cemetery
- Fort Davidson State Historic Site
- Hunter-Dawson State Historic Site
- Jefferson Barracks State Historic Site
- Missouri History Museum
- Missouri State Capitol and State Museum
- Newtonia Battlefield
- Springfield National Cemetery
- Stoddard County Civil War Memorial Cemetery
- The Jesse James Bank Museum
- The Jesse James Farm and Museum
- The Lone Jack Historical Society
- The Stars and Stripes Museum and Library
- Ulysses S. Grant National Historic Site
- Wilson's Creek Civil War Museum
- Wilson's Creek National Battlefield

=== New Mexico ===
- Fort Craig National Historic Site
- Fort Stanton
- Glorieta Battlefield

=== New York ===
- General Grant National Memorial
- Green-Wood Cemetery
- Ulysses S. Grant Cottage State Historic Site
- Woodlawn National Cemetery

=== North Carolina ===
- Averasboro Battlefield
- Beaufort Historic Site
- Bellamy Mansion Museum of History and Design Arts
- Bennett Place State Historic Site
- Bentonville Battlefield State Historic Site
- Brunswick Town/Fort Anderson State Historic Site
- CSS Neuse State Historic Site
- Dare County Civil War Heritage Trail
- Dr. Josephus W. Hall House
- Edenton Bell Battery Cannon
- Fort Branch
- Fort Fisher State Historic Site
- Fort Macon State Park
- Greensboro Historical Museum
- Historic Carson House
- Malcolm Blue Farm
- Museum of the Albemarle
- Museum of the Cape Fear/Arsenal Park
- North Carolina Museum of History
- North Carolina State Capitol
- Orange County Historical Museum
- Port O' Plymouth Museum
- Rowan Museum
- Salisbury National Cemetery
- Smith-McDowell House
- Somerset Place State Historic Site
- Zebulon B. Vance Birthplace State Historic Site

=== Ohio ===
- Buffington Island State Memorial
- Camp Chase Confederate Cemetery
- Custer Monument State Memorial
- John P. Parker Historic Site
- Johnson's Island Cemetery
- McCook House
- Ohio Statehouse
- Rankin House
- Ripley Museum
- Rutherford B. Hayes Presidential Center
- Sherman House Museum
- Spring Grove Cemetery and Arboretum
- The Harriet Beecher Stowe House
- Ulysses S. Grant Birthplace State Memorial

=== Oklahoma ===
- Cabin Creek Battlefield
- Confederate Memorial Museum and Cemetery
- Fort Gibson Historic Site
- Fort Towson Historic Site
- Fort Washita Historic Site
- George M. Murrell Home
- Honey Springs Battlefield
- Oklahoma History Center

=== Pennsylvania ===
- Chambersburg/Franklin County Civil War Driving Tour
- Civil War and Underground Railroad Museum of Philadelphia
- Clarence Clark Park
- David Wills House
- General Lee's Headquarters
- Gettysburg Guided Historic Walking Tours
- Gettysburg Heritage Sites Self-Guided Walking Tour
- Gettysburg National Military Park
- Grand Army of The Republic Civil War Museum and Library
- Historical Society of Pennsylvania
- Jennie Wade House Museum
- Lancaster County's Historical Society & President James Buchanan's Wheatland
- Laurel Hill Cemetery
- LeMoyne House
- Pennsylvania Civil War Battle Flags Collection
- Soldiers and Sailors Memorial Hall and Museum
- The American House of Fritztown & Pappy G's Tavern
- The John Harris-Simon Cameron Mansion
- The Johnson House Historic Site
- The National Civil War Museum
- The Shriver House Museum
- The State Museum of Pennsylvania
- The Woodlands Cemetery
- U.S. Army Heritage and Education Center

=== Rhode Island ===
- Fort Adams

=== South Carolina ===
- Battery 5, James Island New Lines
- Battery White
- Beaufort National Cemetery
- Burt-Stark Mansion
- Cheraw Civil War Sites
- Coastal Discovery Museum at Honey Horn
- Drayton Hall
- Florence National Cemetery
- Fort Howell
- Fort Lamar Historic Preserve
- Fort Moultrie
- Fort Sumter National Monument
- Heyward House Historic Center
- Rivers Bridge State Historic Site
- South Carolina Civil War Museum
- South Carolina Confederate Relic Room and Museum
- South Carolina State House
- South Carolina State Museum
- The H.L. Hunley Project and Submarine Tours

=== Tennessee ===
- Abraham Lincoln Library and Museum
- Andrew Johnson National Historic Site
- Battle of Hartsville Driving Tour
- Battle of Nashville Tour Map
- Battles for Chattanooga Museum
- Belle Meade Plantation
- Belmont Mansion
- Britton Lane Battlefield
- Carnton Plantation
- Chattanooga History Center
- Chattanooga National Cemetery
- Chickamauga and Chattanooga National Military Park/ Chattanooga Battlefields
- Confederate Memorial Hall (Bleak House)
- Confederate Memorial Park at Winstead Hill
- Copy of Shiloh Battlefield
- Copy of Shiloh Battlefield
- Davis Bridge Battlefield
- Dickson-Williams Mansion
- Dover Hotel (Surrender House), Fort Donelson National Battlefield
- East Tennessee History Center
- Fort Defiance/Fort Sevier/Fort Bruce
- Fort Dickerson
- Fort Donelson National Battlefield
- Fort Granger
- Fort Pillow State Historic Park
- Fortress Rosecrans, Stones River National Battlefield
- From Bridge to Bridge Driving Tour Brochure
- Historic Chockley Tavern
- Johnsonville State Historic Park
- Johnsonville State Historic Park
- Knoxville Driving Tour, Siege of Knoxville and Battle of Fort Sanders
- Mabry-Hazen House Museum and Bethel Cemetery
- McGavock Confederate Cemetery
- Memphis National Cemetery
- Memphis Pink Palace Museum
- Mississippi River Museum at Mud Island
- Nashville National Cemetery
- Nathan Bedford Forrest Park
- Nathan Bedford Forrest State Park
- Oaklands Historic House Museum
- Old Gray Cemetery
- Parker's Crossroads Battlefield Self-Guided Tour
- Salem Cemetery Battlefield
- Sam Davis Home
- Shiloh Battlefield
- Shy's Hill
- Stones River National Battlefield
- Tennessee River Museum
- Tennessee State Museum and State Capitol
- The Athenaeum Rectory
- The Carter House
- The Inn at Hunt Phelan
- Town of La Grange
- Travellers Rest Plantation and Museum
- Tullahoma Campaign Civil War Trail
- Spring Hill Battlefield

=== Texas ===
- Camp Ford Historic Site and Park
- Confederate Soldiers Monument
- Fort Bliss Museum
- Fort Brown and Historic Brownsville Museum
- Fort Davis National Historic Site
- Hill College History Complex
- Liendo Plantation
- Lorenzo de Zavala State Archives and Library Building
- Palmito Ranch Battlefield
- Palo Alto Battlefield National Historical Park
- Sabine Pass State Historical Park
- Sam Bell Maxey House State Historic Site
- Texas Governor's Mansion
- Texas Historical Commission's Library
- Texas State Cemetery
- The Rosenberg Library/Galveston and Texas History Center
- Treue Der Union Monument

=== Vermont ===
- St. Albans Historical Museum

=== Virginia ===
- Alexandria National Cemetery
- Appomattox Court House National Historical Park
- Arlington House, The Robert E. Lee Memorial
- Auto Driving Tour of Civil War Lynchburg
- Ball's Bluff Battlefield Regional Park
- Battle of Front Royal Driving Tour
- Belle Boyd Cottage
- Belle Grove Plantation
- Ben Lomond Historic Site
- Berkeley Plantation at Harrison's Landing
- Bermuda Hundred Campaign Tour
- Blandford Church and Cemetery
- Brandy Station Battlefield
- Bristoe Station Battlefield Heritage Park
- Cedar Creek Battlefield
- Cedar Mountain Battlefield
- Centre Hill Mansion
- Centre Hill Museum
- Christ Church
- Cold Harbor Battlefield and Visitors Center
- Cold Harbor Battlefield Park
- Colonial National Historical Park
- Colonial Williamsburg
- Cross Keys Battlefield
- Endview Plantation
- Fairfax Museum and Visitor Center
- First Day at Chancellorsville Battlefield
- Fisher's Hill
- Fort Ward Museum and Historic Site
- Fredericksburg and Spotsylvania National Military Park
- Fredericksburg Area Museum
- Gaines' Mill Battlefield
- George Washington's Boyhood Home at Ferry Farm
- Glendale Battlefield and Visitors Center
- Graffiti House at Brandy Station
- Harris Farm Battlefield
- Harrisonburg-Rockingham Historical Society
- Hatcher's Run Battlefield
- Historic Kenmore
- Hollywood Cemetery
- Hupp's Hill Civil War Park
- John B. Magruder's Dam No. 1
- Laurel Hill, Birthplace Of J.E.B. Stuart
- Lee Chapel and Museum
- Lee Hall Mansion
- Lee's Mill, Rivers Ridge Circle
- Malvern Hill Battlefield
- Manassas National Battlefield Park
- McDowell Battlefield
- Mosby Heritage Area, Rector House
- Museum of Culpeper History
- New Market Battlefield State Historical Park and Hall of Valor Museum
- North Anna Battlefield Park
- Old City Cemetery and Pest House Medical Museum
- Pamplin Historical Park and The National Museum of the Civil War Soldier
- Petersburg National Battlefield
- Poplar Grove National Cemetery
- Port Republic Battlefield
- Richmond National Battlefield Park
- Sailor's Creek Battlefield Historical State Park
- Sandusky Historic Site and Civil War Museum
- Siege Museum
- Skiffes Creek Redoubt
- Spotsylvania County Museum
- Spotsylvania Court House Historic District
- Staunton River Battlefield State Park
- Stonewall Confederate Cemetery
- Stonewall Jackson House
- Stonewall Jackson's Grave
- Stonewall Jackson's Headquarters Museum
- Stratford Hall Plantation
- Sully Historic Site
- Sutherlin Mansion
- The American Civil War Center at Historic Tredegar
- The Casemate Museum at Fort Monroe
- The Manassas Museum System
- The Mariners' Museum
- The Museum and White House of the Confederacy
- The Valentine Richmond History Center
- The Virginia Capitol
- Third Winchester Battlefield
- Virginia Historical Society
- Virginia Military Institute Museum
- Virginia War Museum
- Warren Rifles Confederate Museum
- White Oak Civil War Museum
- White Oak Road Battlefield
- Young's Mill

=== West Virginia ===
- Belle Boyd House and Civil War Museum and Archives
- Bulltown Historic Area
- Camp Allegheny
- Carnifex Ferry Battlefield State Park
- Cheat Summit Fort
- Droop Mountain Battlefield State Park
- Grafton National Cemetery
- Harpers Ferry National Historical Park
- Jackson's Mill Historic Area
- Jenkins Plantation Museum
- Lewisburg National Register Historic District/Greenbrier County Visitor Center
- Philippi Covered Bridge
- Philippi Historic District
- Rich Mountain Battlefield Civil War Site
- Shepherdstown Historic District
- West Virginia Independence Hall Museum

=== Wisconsin ===
- Kenosha Civil War Museum
- Wisconsin Veterans Museum
