= Shorter Cemetery =

Historic site in Barbour County, Alabama, US

Coordinates: 31°53′03″N 85°08′01″W

- Interactive map of Shorter Cemetery

Details
- Location: Eufaula, Alabama
- Size: 5 acres (2.0 ha)

The Shorter Cemetery is an American Civil War-era cemetery in Eufaula, Barbour County, Alabama, United States. The cemetery is located on 5 acres (2.0 ha) in the middle of downtown Eufaula, on a bluff overlooking Lake Eufaula near the Shorter home, which burned in 1885. It is where Governor John Gill Shorter, his family (including his father, the General Reuben Clark Shorter), and his family's slaves are buried.

In 2010, the cemetery was listed as one of Alabama's most endangered sites by the Alabama Historical Commission and Alabama Trust for Historic Preservation due to vandalism and natural deterioration of the tombstones, statues, walls, and fencing.

== See also ==
- Shorter Mansion
- List of Civil War Discovery Trail sites
- Places in Peril (Alabama)
