= Great Western Trail =

Western states hiking trail in the US

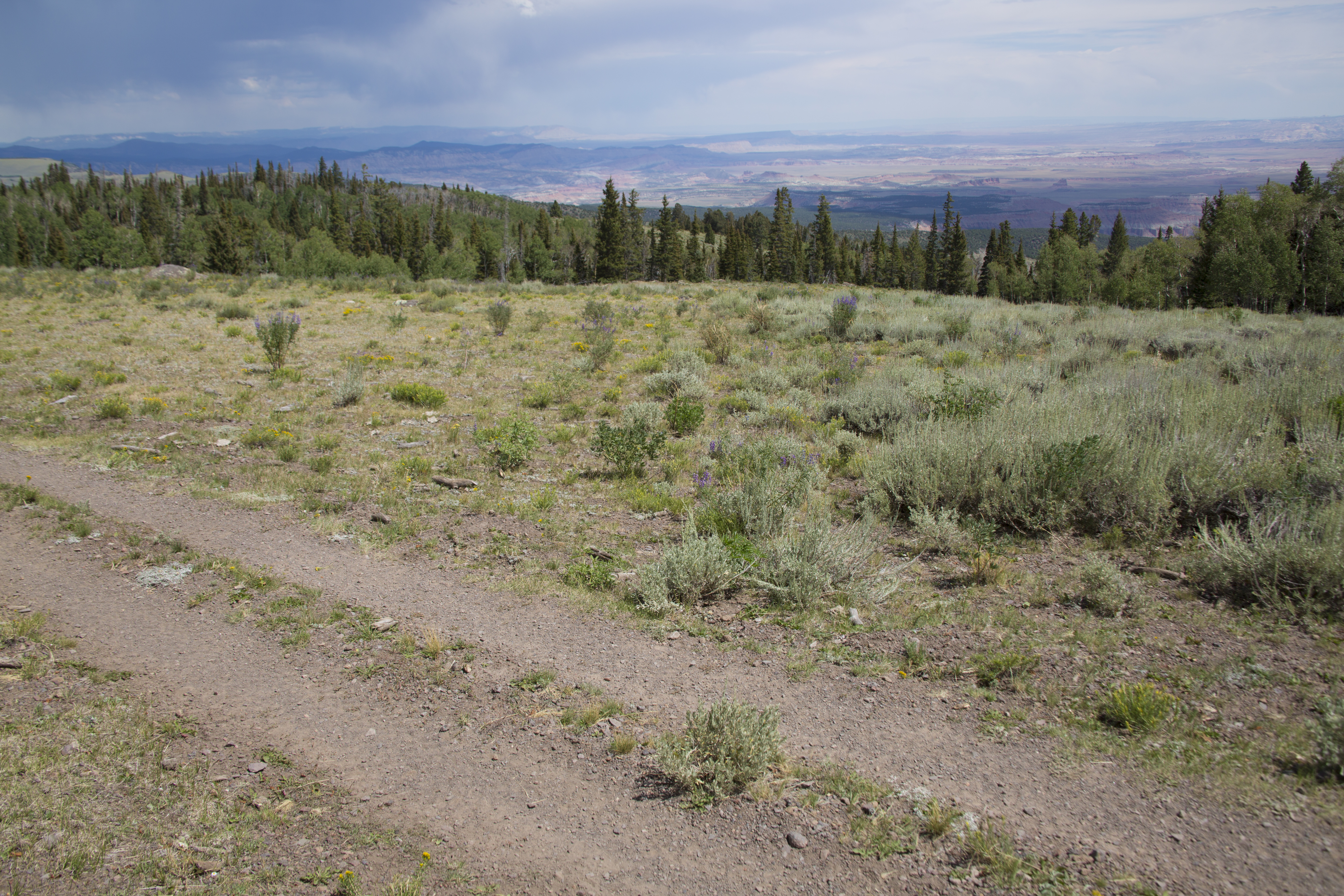
The Great Western Trail in Fishlake National Forest, Utah.

The Great Western Trail is a north-south long distance multiple use route that runs from Canada to Mexico through five western states in the United States. The trail has access for motorized and non-motorized use and traverses 4,455 miles (7,170 km) through Arizona, Utah, Idaho, Wyoming, and Montana. It was designated a National Millennium Trail in 1999. Trailforks shows 866 miles of a trail.

== Origins ==
In 1776, two Spanish priests, Dominguez and Escalante, camped with Paiute Native Americans at the base of the Kaibab Plateau in northern Arizona. The trail the Natives showed them, now known as the Jacob Hamblin/Mormon Honeymoon Trail, still exists, as does Beale's Wagon Road and the Moqui Stage Station. These sites and trails are part of the Great Western Trail and travelers can visit them on foot, All Terrain Vehicles (ATVs), bicycles, horseback, snowmobiles, or a 4-wheel drive vehicle towing an off-road trailer.

Except for the fires, floods, and landslides that have occurred over the centuries, they are as they were when pioneers, cattle ranchers, and Mormon Honeymooners first ventured into Arizona: teeming with wildlife, exotic plants, and breathtaking rock formations that expose the history of the earth.

== History ==
Lyle Gomm, a former Intermountain Region Trail Coordinator, is the "father" of the GWT. His idea to create a long distance trail open to a variety of users began in Utah during the 1970s, and in 1985 he organized an inter-agency team including the Forest Service, Utah Department of Natural Resources, Bureau of Land Management, and the National Park Service to create the Bonneville Rim Trail to connect the Grand Canyon and Yellowstone National Parks. In 1986, Dale Sheewalter, a volunteer promoter of the Arizona Trail (Grand Canyon National Park to Nogales, Mexico), suggested the Arizona and Bonneville Rim Trails be renamed the "Great Western Trail."

In 1988, Simon Cordial, 26, from England, and James Mayberger, 29, from New York, teamed up to become the first to thru-hike the proposed GWT from Canada to Mexico. Their journey began June 1, near Priest Lake State Park, Idaho, and ended October 15, 1988 at the Mexican border a few miles east of Douglas, Arizona. In 1990, the Great Western Trail Association was incorporated under the provisions of the Utah Nonprofit Corporation and Cooperative Association Act. The Great Western Trail joins backcountry trails, dirt or gravel roads, and high speed highways, to create a system of routes that terminate independently or rejoin a main route. It was conceived as a 4,500-mile long network of preexisting trails that would traverse central Arizona, Utah, and Wyoming, and end at the Idaho-Montana border with Canada.

== In Arizona ==
In Arizona the GWT begins in Phoenix in the southern desert Basin and Range Province where vegetation is sparse but cacti, mixed grasses, chaparral, and sagebrush thrive in the alkali soil, before arriving at the Arizona Mountains forests in the middle of the state. Here, at elevations between 5,000 and 10,000 feet with high temperatures throughout the year, piñon trees, Apache fir, aspen, and bristlecone pine abound. It ends in the northern Colorado Plateau Region amid Douglas fir and Ponderosa pine. Tablelands here range from 5,000 to 7,000 feet, winters are cold, summers warm, and rain and snow are common. The GWT Association and the Arizona State Association of 4-Wheel Drive Clubs have designated 350 miles of trail from Phoenix to the Utah border. The completed northern two-thirds is on Federal land, but in southern Arizona the proposed route is on state and private land.

The projected route near the Mexican border may access the Madrean Sky Islands. Weldon Heald coined the term sky island in 1967 to denote mountain ranges isolated from each other by intervening valleys of grassland or desert which inhibit the movement of various species, as seas isolate plants and animals on islands.

Near Tucson, 30 miles north of the U.S.-Mexico border, the proposed trail would transect the Butterfield Road, an old stagecoach and wagon route between Yuma, Arizona, and Santa Fe, New Mexico, earlier used by the Mormon Battalion.

Bulldog Canyon in the Tonto National Forest, the first leg of the trail, was dedicated in April 1996. Two years later the 72-mile Cave Creek segment was completed and the Sears-Kay Ruin, an ancient Hohokam village atop a hill overlooking Cave Creek, became the first "Point of Discovery." This passes the Seven Springs Campground, an oasis developed by the Civilian Conservation Corps in the 1930s, as it winds its way to Bloody Basin Road. It then crosses the Agua Fria National Monument or, for the more adventurous, turns north on a rocky trail that crosses shale ledges and rivers to Dugas and to the San Dominique Winery before crossing grasslands, riverbeds, and over Mingus Mountain to enter Martin Canyon, known as Smiley Rock because of a pumpkin sized rock on the trail that appears to have eyes, nose, and a mouth.

From here it is a leisurely ride to Jerome, a mining town that rapidly declined after mining ended in 1953. Artisans have revived it and it is now a tourist destination. The trail then goes north to Perkinsville in the Verde Valley and onto the Mogollon Rim and the world's largest stand of Ponderosa pines. Sycamore Canyon with its red sandstone sculptures, is another "Point of Discovery." The trail continues to Parks and Williams on I-40, and though the grasslands and forests of the Williams Ranger District of the Kaibab National Forest, before entering the Tusayan Ranger District. This section of the trail, after a bewildering patchwork of unmarked paths on the Navajo Nation, (not officially part of the Great Western Trail), then slips off the Coconino Plateau south of the Little Colorado River Gorge in the austere world of red and white sandstone.

After crossing the Navajo Bridge over Marble Canyon, and skirting the Vermilion Cliffs, the GWT starts anew at House Rock Valley Buffalo Ranch with a difficult ascent into the mountains along a trail at the base of the Kaibab Plateau. A marker states that Spanish priests Dominquez and Escalante traded for food with the Paiute Indians in 1776. North of South Fork Canyon the GWT ascends the north plateau of the Kaibab National Forest where California Condor soar in the thermals above the Vermillion Cliffs, and Rocky Mountain elk, white-tailed and mule deer, horses, antelope, black bear roam. A few miles southeast of Jacob Lake, the last leg of the trail travels north to Orderville Canyon, descends the North Kaibab Plateau toward the Buckskin Mountains and into Utah with views of the Chocolate, Vermilion, and White Cliffs.

The Great Western Trail meanders through sandy deserts and forested mountains and presents many challenges. Maps are available at Ranger Stations in the Tonto, Kaibab, and Prescott National Forests, as well as in the guidebook Driving the Great Western Trail in Arizona.

The trail sections in the southern part of the state are open year-round. Sections in the north may be closed from December to May due to snow or flooding. A permit is required to drive on state lands, in the Tonto Forest, on Indian Lands, and to drive Bulldog Canyon section of the GWT. There are no services along the GWT.
