= Maine Consolidated Elementary School District =

School district in Arizona, United States

Address
- 10 North Spring Valley Road Parks, Arizona, 86018; United States

District information
- Type: Public
- Grades: PreK–8
- NCES District ID: 0404530

Students and staff
- Students: 122
- Teachers: 13.8
- Staff: 12.73
- Student–teacher ratio: 8.84

Other information
- Website: mcsd10.org

Maine Consolidated School District 10 is a school district in Coconino County, Arizona. It serves the community of Parks, Arizona.
