= National Millennium Trails =

Long-distance trails in the United States

National Millennium Trails are 16 short- and long-distance trails selected from 58 nominees as visionary trails that reflect defining aspects of America's history and culture. The trails were chosen on June 26, 1999, by the White House Millennium Council and announced by U.S. Transportation Secretary Rodney Slater at the second international Trails and Greenways Conference in Pittsburgh, PA.

1. Unicoi Turnpike – 68.8 miles (110.7 km) – from Murphy, North Carolina westward to Vonore, Tennessee exploring the Cherokee Trail of Tears
2. Cascadia Marine Trail – 160 miles (260 km) – from Olympia, Washington to Point Roberts, Washington at the Canada–United States border tracing early Native American trade routes in the Puget Sound region.
3. Juan Bautista de Anza National Historic Trail – 1,200 miles (1,900 km) – from Nogales, Arizona northwestward to San Francisco, California marks the route of Spain's exploration and settlement led by Juan Bautista de Anza
4. Freedom Trail – 2.5 miles (4.0 km) – from Boston Common to Bunker Hill Monument in Boston, Massachusetts connecting 15 sites of great significance in the Colonial history of the United States.
5. Lewis and Clark National Historic Trail – 3,700 miles (6,000 km) – from Camp DuBois at Wood River, Illinois westward to Les Shirley Park, Oregon commemorating the Lewis and Clark Expedition of 1804 to 1806.
6. Underground Railroad – various routes through the eastern United States, Texas, Oklahoma, southern Canada, Mexico and the Caribbean representing the Underground Railroad escape routes for people held in slavery prior to the American Civil War.
7. Civil War Discovery Trail – 500 sites in 27 states – honors the sacrifices and hardships of the American Civil War.
8. International Express – 5 miles (8.0 km) – Queens County, New York from Sunnyside to Flushing follows the route of the New York City Subway's IRT Flushing Line (7 and <7> trains), an underground and elevated subway line which was built to redistribute the large numbers of recent immigrants in the early 1900s.
9. Iditarod National Historic Trail – 938 miles (1,510 km) – Seward, Alaska northwestward to Nome, Alaska traces America's only remaining frontier trail, the route of the Iditarod Trail Sled Dog Race and the human migratory route across the Bering Land Bridge.
10. Appalachian National Scenic Trail – 2,160 miles (3,480 km) – Springer Mountain, Georgia to Mt. Katahdin, Maine this forested trail is the longest natural public thoroughfare in the world
11. Great Western Trail – 3,100 miles (5,000 km) – Canada–US border southward to the Mexico–US border through Montana, Idaho, Wyoming, Utah and Arizona
12. North Country National Scenic Trail – 4,600 miles (7,400 km) – from Lake Sakakawea, North Dakota eastward to Port Henry, New York traversing the different types of landscapes that define the northern rim of the continental United States.
13. Hatfield–McCoy Trail System – 2,000 miles (3,200 km) through West Virginia, Kentucky and Virginia along the mountain ridges and abandoned coal mining fields of southern West Virginia
14. East Coast Greenway – 3,000 miles (4,800 km) – Key West, Florida northward to Calais, Maine connecting 15 of America's most populous states and most major cities on the eastern seaboard.
15. Mississippi River Trail – 2,000 miles (3,200 km) – from Lake Itasca, Minnesota southward to New Orleans, Louisiana honors one of the world's longest rivers.
16. American Discovery Trail – 6,356 miles (10,229 km) from Cape Henlopen State Park, Delaware westward to Point Reyes National Seashore, California

First Lady Hillary Clinton said about the designations:

Through the Millennium Trails project, we are building and maintaining trails that tell the story of our nation's past and will help to create a positive vision for our future. The 16 National Millennium Trails that [the Secretary of Transportation] designated today are all visionary projects that define us as Americans.
