= Painted Bluff =

Neolithic rock art site in Alabama

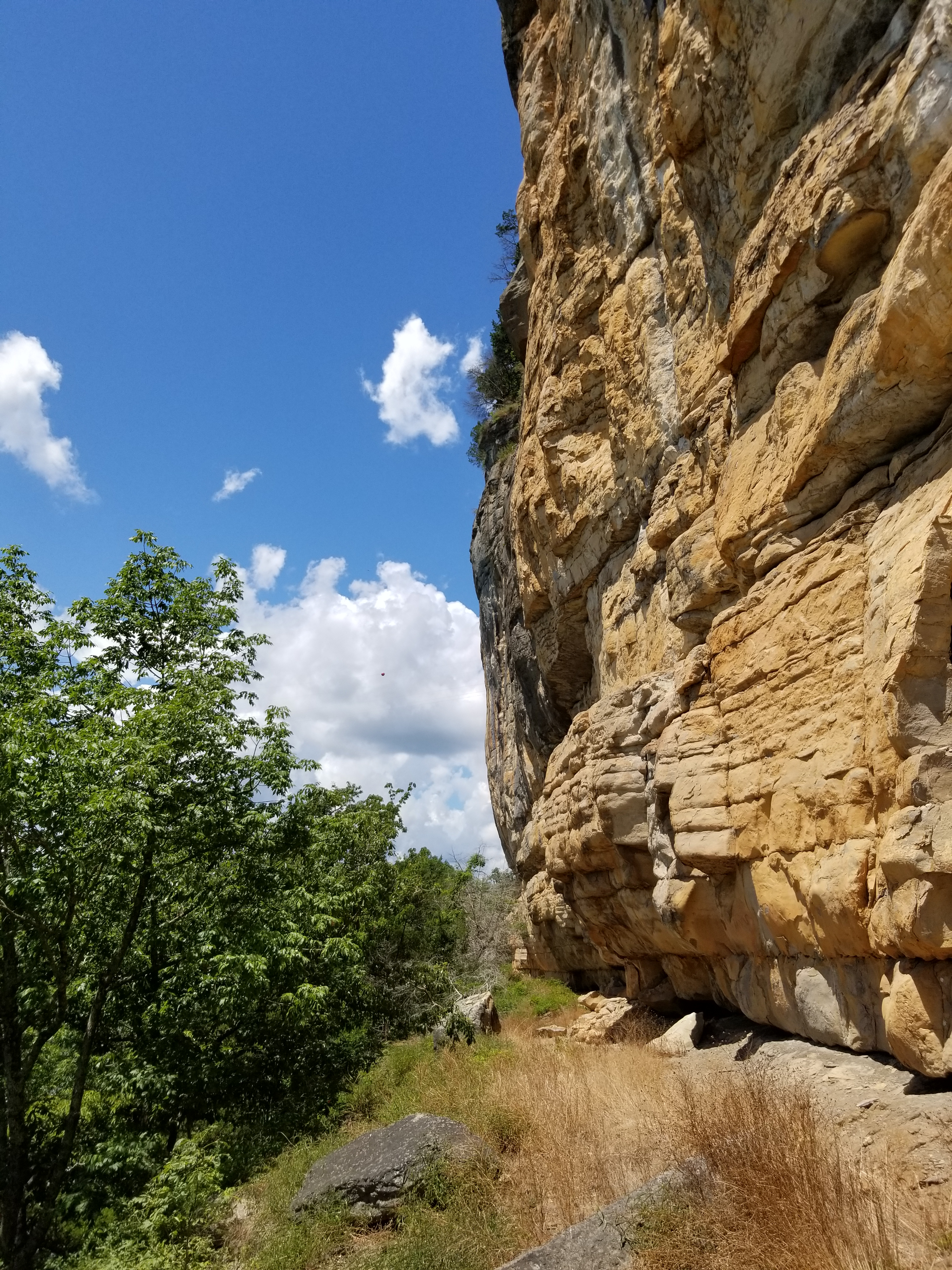
- The cliff face of Painted Bluff. Facing west along the middle ledge.
- Interactive map of Painted Bluff
- 34°27′47.33″N 86°26′46.95″W
- Cultures: Woodland and Mississippian
- Location: Marshal County, Alabama

Site notes
- Elevation: 248 m (814 ft)
- Archaeologists: Jan Simek
- Owner: Federal government of the United States
- Management: Tennessee Valley Authority

Painted Bluff is a cliff overlooking the Tennessee River in Marshall County, Alabama that features over 130 individual prehistoric Native American pictographs and petroglyphs. Painted Bluff is located about 4 miles (6.4 km) downstream from the Guntersville Dam and is only accessible by boat. The bluff is divided into three levels: the low ledge along the river, a middle ledge above it, and a high ledge near the top of the cliff face. A small cave is located along the low ledge.

Due to the humid environment, open-air rock art sites are rare in the Southeastern United States. TVA archaeologist Erin Pritchard considers Painted Bluff to be "one of, if not the, most significant open-air rock art occurrence[s]" in the region.

The bluff has been subject to graffiti from the earliest days of its discovery by European Americans, with the oldest graffiti dating to the nineteenth century.

Painted Bluff is protected by the Archaeological Resources Protection Act of 1979, meaning that damaging or destroying any property is considered a felony.

== History ==
Painted Bluff is a rocky outcropping of limestone that overlooks the Tennessee River. The carboniferous limestone that comprises the bluff formed between 359 and 323 million years ago, predating the formation of the North American contentment. It is mainly composed of Bangor Limestone.

Painted Bluff was inhabited by humans throughout the Woodland period into the Mississippian period, from about 800 BC to 1500 AD.

The first written references to Painted Bluff are from the nineteenth-century jurist and historian John Haywood in his 1823 book The Natural and Aboriginal History of Tennessee. Haywood moved to Nashville, Tennessee from his home state of North Carolina in 1807 and became fascinated by the prehistoric artifacts and monuments in the region. He believed that these artifacts and monuments were left by one of the Lost Tribes of Israel.

In 1959, the rock art of Painted Bluff was the subject of one of the first chemical analyses on rock art pigment ever published.

== Rock art ==
Distribution of Rock art
	Low Ledge	Middle Ledge	High Ledge
Anthropomorphs	3	10	1
Birds	0	4	0
Boxes	0	6	0
Circles	2	28	16
Fish	0	5	0
Lines	0	31	0
Maces	0	2	0
Mammals	0	3	0
Patches	0	8	0
Other	0	18	0
Total	5	115	17

Archaeologists have identified a total of 137 prehistoric images at Painted Bluff. Most of the images, 133 in total, are painted pictographs. The remaining four are engraved petroglyphs. These images are distributed across the three ledges of the bluff. There are 5 images located on the low ledge, 115 images on the middle ledge, and 17 images on the high ledge. The rock art images at the painted bluff can be categorized into nine different motifs. These motifs are: circles, lines and curves, boxes and rectangles, patches or swatches, maces, fish, birds, quadrupeds or mammals, anthropomorphs, and others.

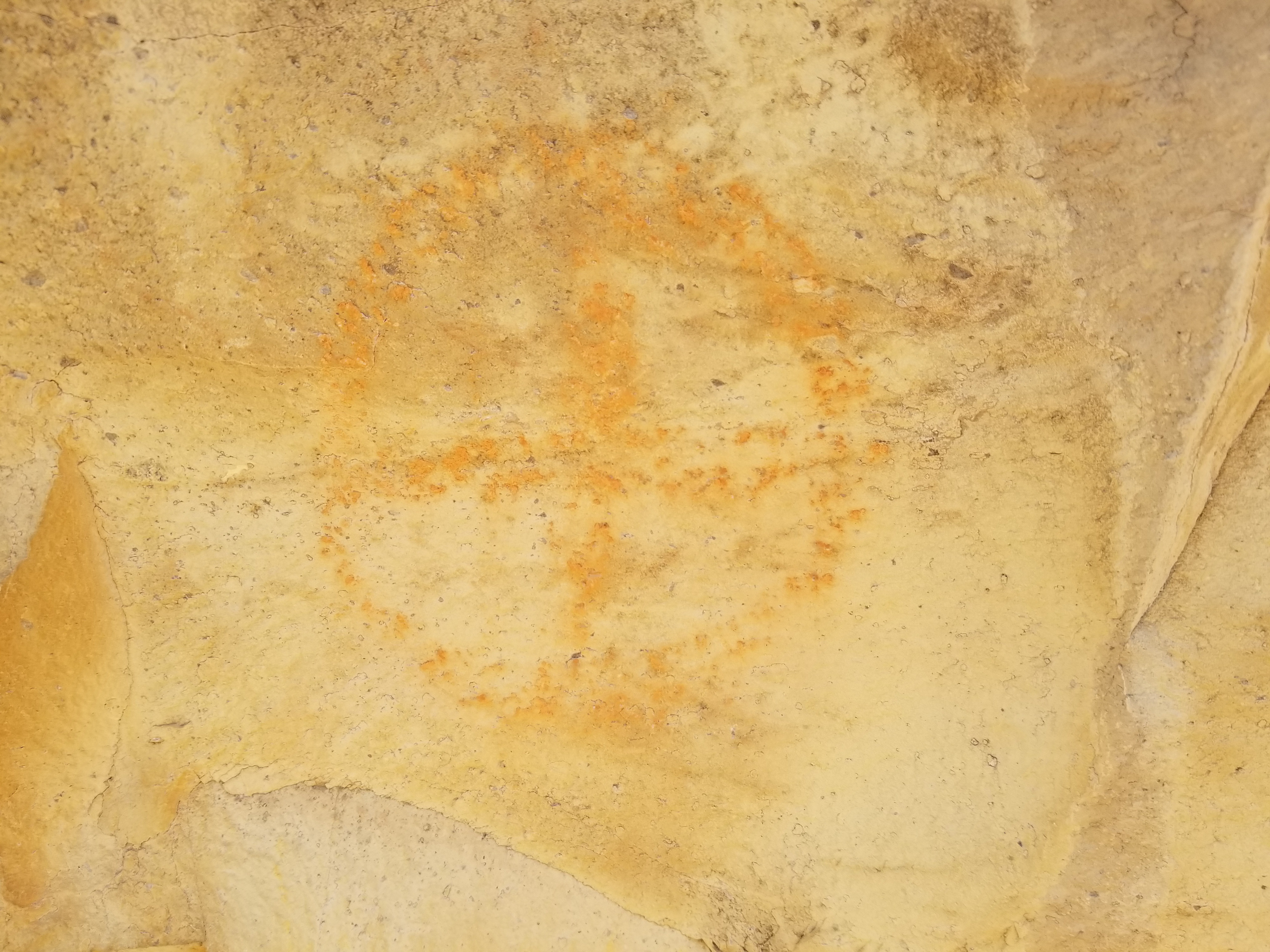
A pictograph of an orange circle with a cross through it. This "cross-in-circle" is a common symbol from the Mississippian Period.

The most common motif found in the rock art of Painted Bluff is circular shapes. Of the 137 total images, 47 images are various forms of circles. These include "simple rings, solid disks, concentric circles," and "circles filled with lines or crosses. Circles filled with crosses, or "cross-in-circle(s)", are a common Native American religious icon from the Mississippian Period. All but one of the pictographs on the high ledge are circuital motifs.

The second most common motif found in the rock art of Painted Bluff is linear forms. Of the 137 total images, 31 are composed of various forms of lines and curves. These include simple line segments, curved lines, groups of overlapping lines, and more complex arrangements such as crosshatching. All four of the engraved petroglyphs are classified in this category.

Of the 137 total images, 6 are boxes or rectangles. These pictographs are rectilinear shapes with clear right angles. Some of the examples are not complete or closed rectangles; some of them are either incomplete rectangles with open sides or are partially eroded. All of the pictographs of this motif are located along the middle ledge.

Some of the pictographs at Painted Bluff consist of patches and swatches of pigment. Of the 137 total images, 8 are classified into this motif. Most of these pictographs are solid patches of pigment with no outline. Some of them may have been the result of swiping an applicator across the rock to clean it. Most of them, however, appear to have been intentionally made, which is suggested by the thickness of the pigment and the size of the glyph. All examples of these patches and swatches are located on the middle ledge.

Two of the 137 total pictographs have been identified as weapons or maces. These have been identified as maces due to their resemblance to other prehistoric art in the Southeast that have been identified as maces. Both of these pictographs are located on the middle ledge.

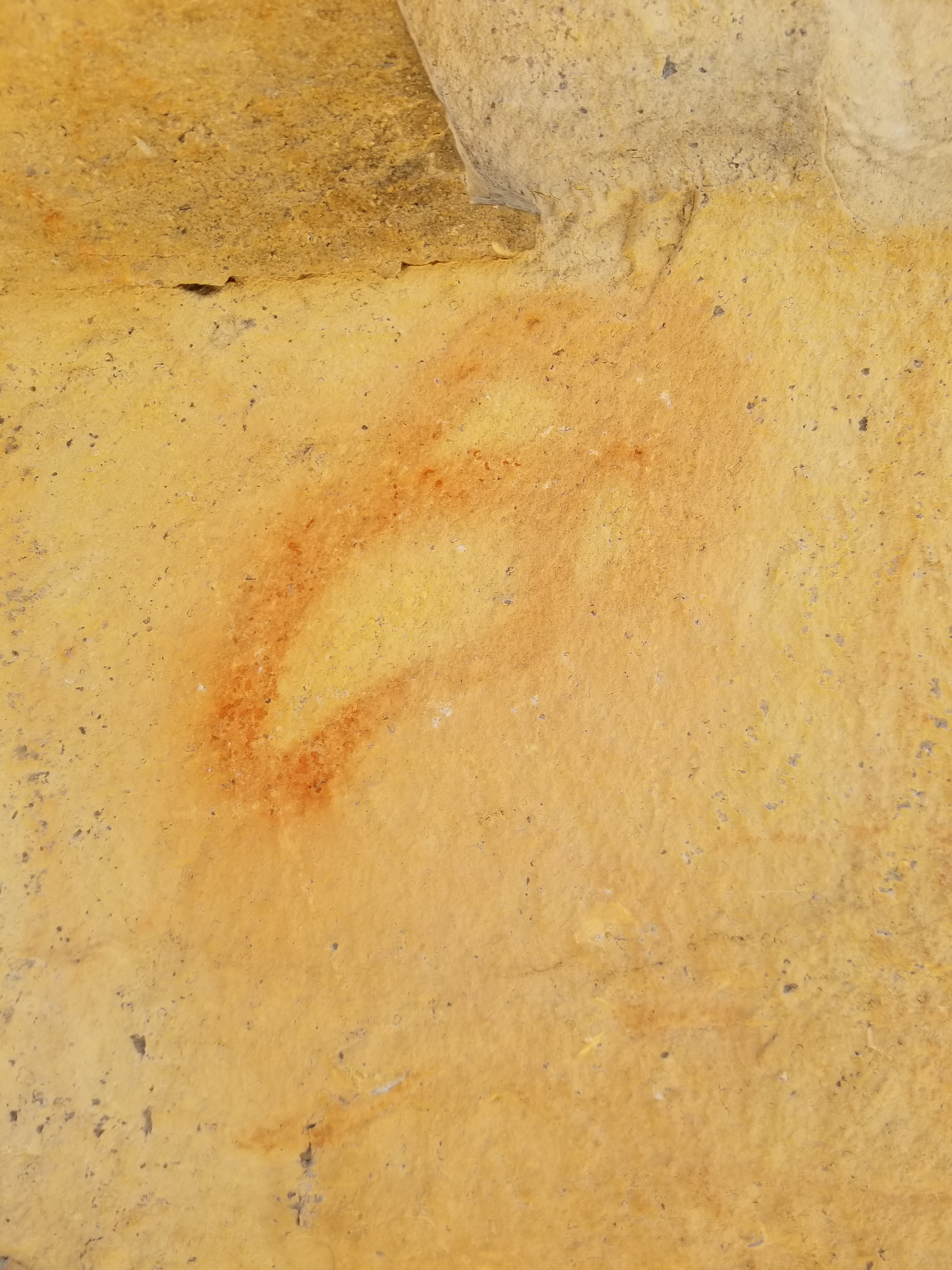
While this pictograph might resemble Edvard Munch's painting The Scream, it actually depicts the underside of a catfish. The "eyes" are actually the fish's lateral gill openings.

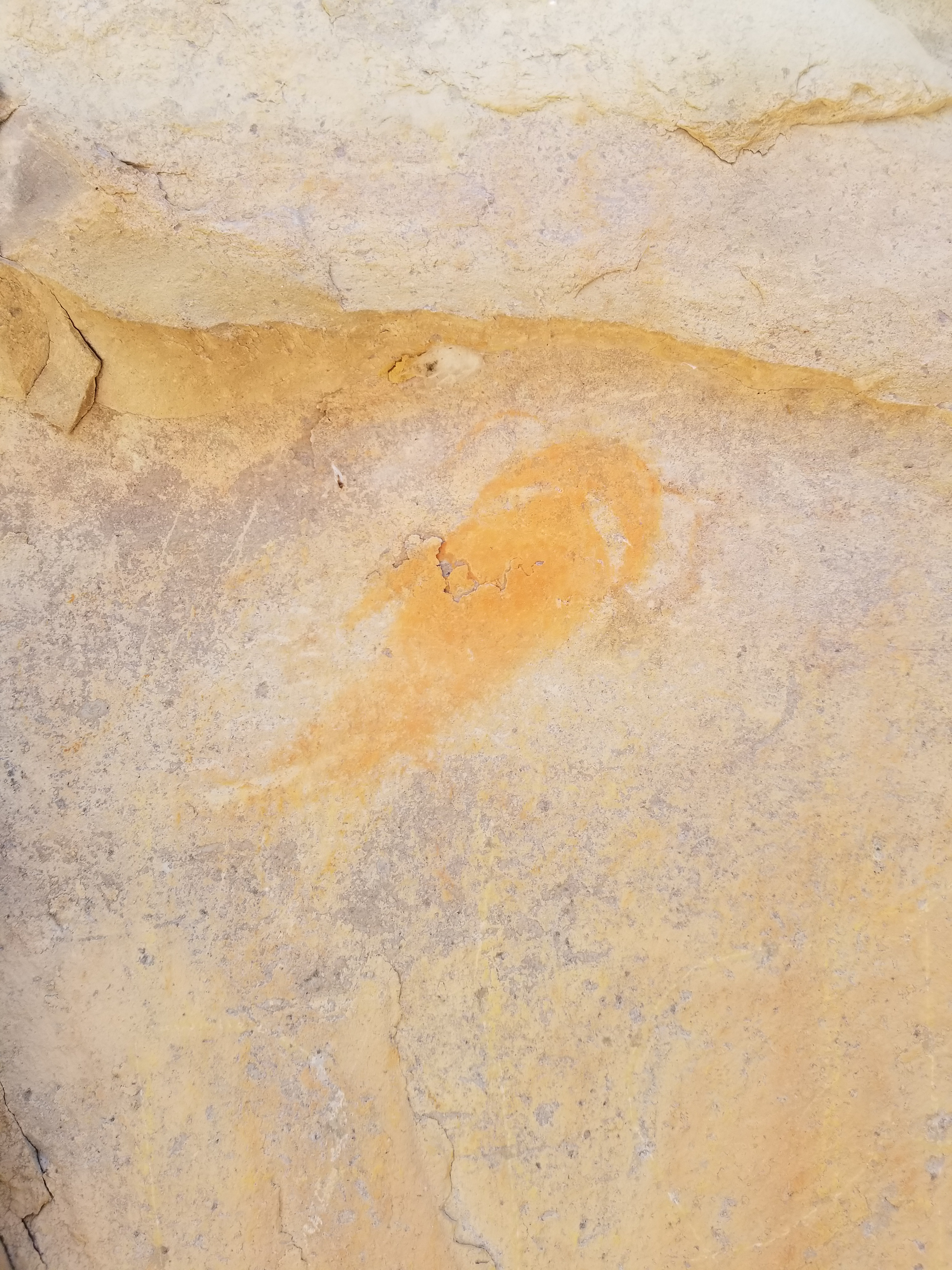
Another pictograph of a catfish viewed from below. It is clearly recognizable by its barbels and pectoral fins.

Twelve of the pictographs at Painted Bluff depict different types of animals. Five of the 137 total pictographs depict fish. In four cases, the specific kind of fish has been identified. Three have been identified as catfish, and one has been identified as a species of American black bass. The fifth pictograph is not detailed enough to be identified as a specific kind of fish. Four of the pictographs depict birds. (Note: There are also pictographs that depict humans with avian characteristics, however, those are categorized separately as anthropomorphs.) These four images depict two herons, a male turkey, and either a hummingbird or woodpecker. Additionally, three pictographs depict mammals or quadrupeds. All of the fish, bird, and mammal pictographs are located along the middle ledge.

Fourteen of the 137 total pictographs depict human or anthropomorphic figures. Human or anthropomorphic figures are the only motif other than circles that appear on all three ledges of Painted Bluff.

Nineteen of the 137 total pictographs have been classified as "Other". These images are classified as such because they do not fit into any of the other categories, either because they are unrecognizable or because they are recognizable but unique.

== Preservation efforts ==
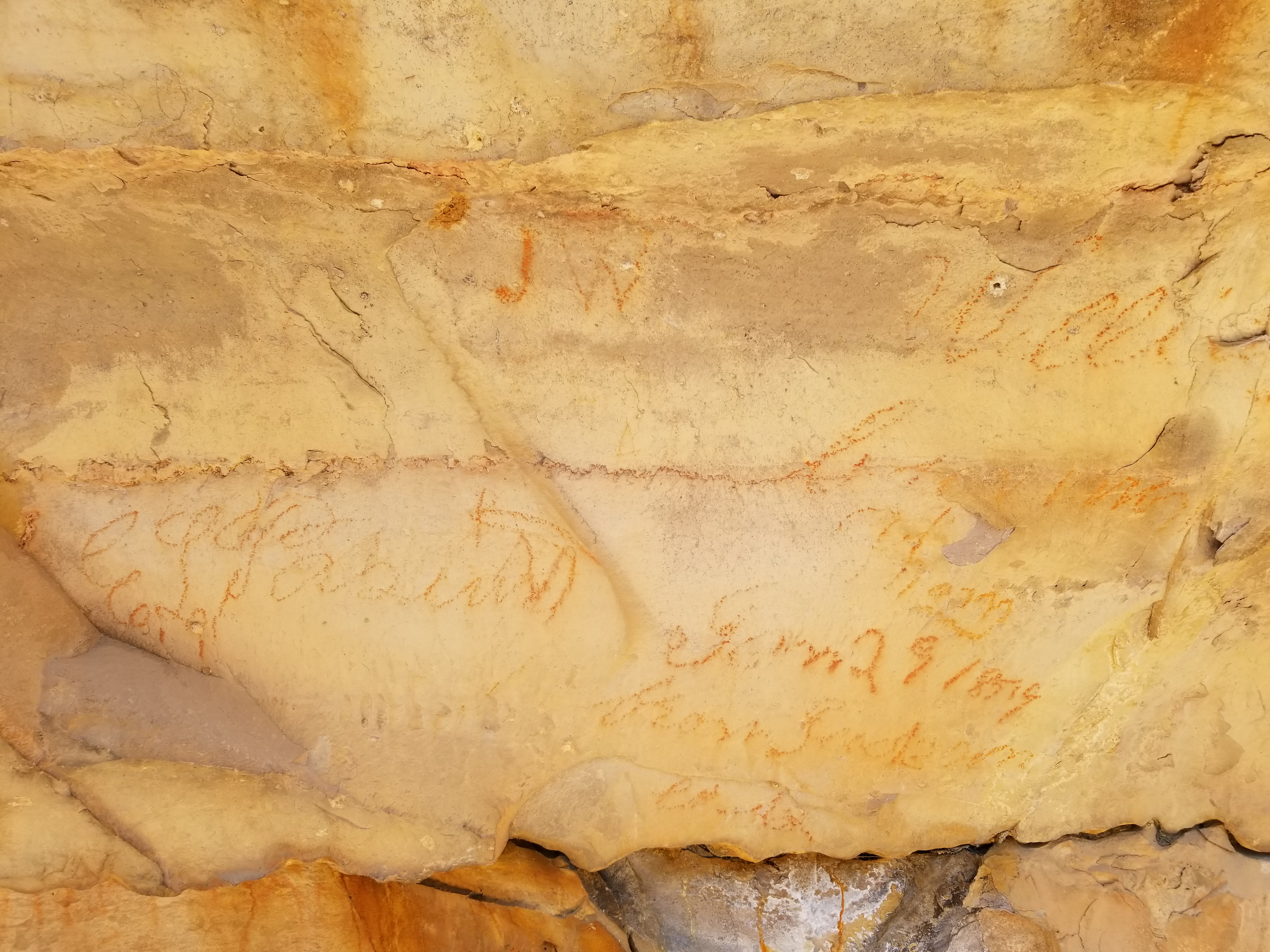
Historic graffiti dated 1859. It was drawn with a chunk of dry ochre, as opposed to being painted like the prehistoric pictographs.

Beginning in 2004, the TVA partnered with the University of Tennessee's Archaeological research team to document and research Painted Bluff. They discovered that both natural weathering and human activities were damaging the rock art and the site. There was extensive graffiti on the walls of the cliff, more of which continued to appear over the years. The site was also being damaged by rock climbers, who were driving steel anchors into the fragile surface of the cliff and writing climbing routes onto the walls of the rock.

In 2013, the Alabama Historical Commission listed Painted Bluff as one of its Places in Peril. In early 2014, a project took place to remove the graffiti from the site. During this project, as many as 122 different instances of graffiti were removed or camouflaged. Historic graffiti older than 50 years was left in place, which was required by the National Historic Preservation Act.

In 2016, the project of preservation and graffiti removal at Painted Bluff received the Chairman's Award for Achievement in Historic Preservation from the Advisory Council on Historic Preservation.

=== List of parties involved in preservation efforts ===
The following organizations and Native American tribes are involved with the preservation efforts at Painted Bluff:

- Tennessee Valley Authority
- Alabama Historical Commission
- Cherokee Nation
- Eastern Band of Cherokee Indians
- United Keetoowah Band of Cherokee Indians in Oklahoma
- Muscogee Creek Nation of Oklahoma
- Alabama–Coushatta Tribe of Texas
- Alabama–Quassarte Tribal Town
- Kialegee Tribal Town
- Thlopthlocco Tribal Town
- Poarch Band of Creek Indians
- Seminole Nation of Oklahoma
- Seminole Tribe of Florida
- Absentee Shawnee Tribe of Oklahoma
- Eastern Shawnee Tribe of Oklahoma
- Shawnee Tribe of Oklahoma
- Chickasaw Nation
- University of Tennessee
- University of Alabama
- Southeastern Climbers Coalition
- Stratum Unlimited LLC

== Gallery ==
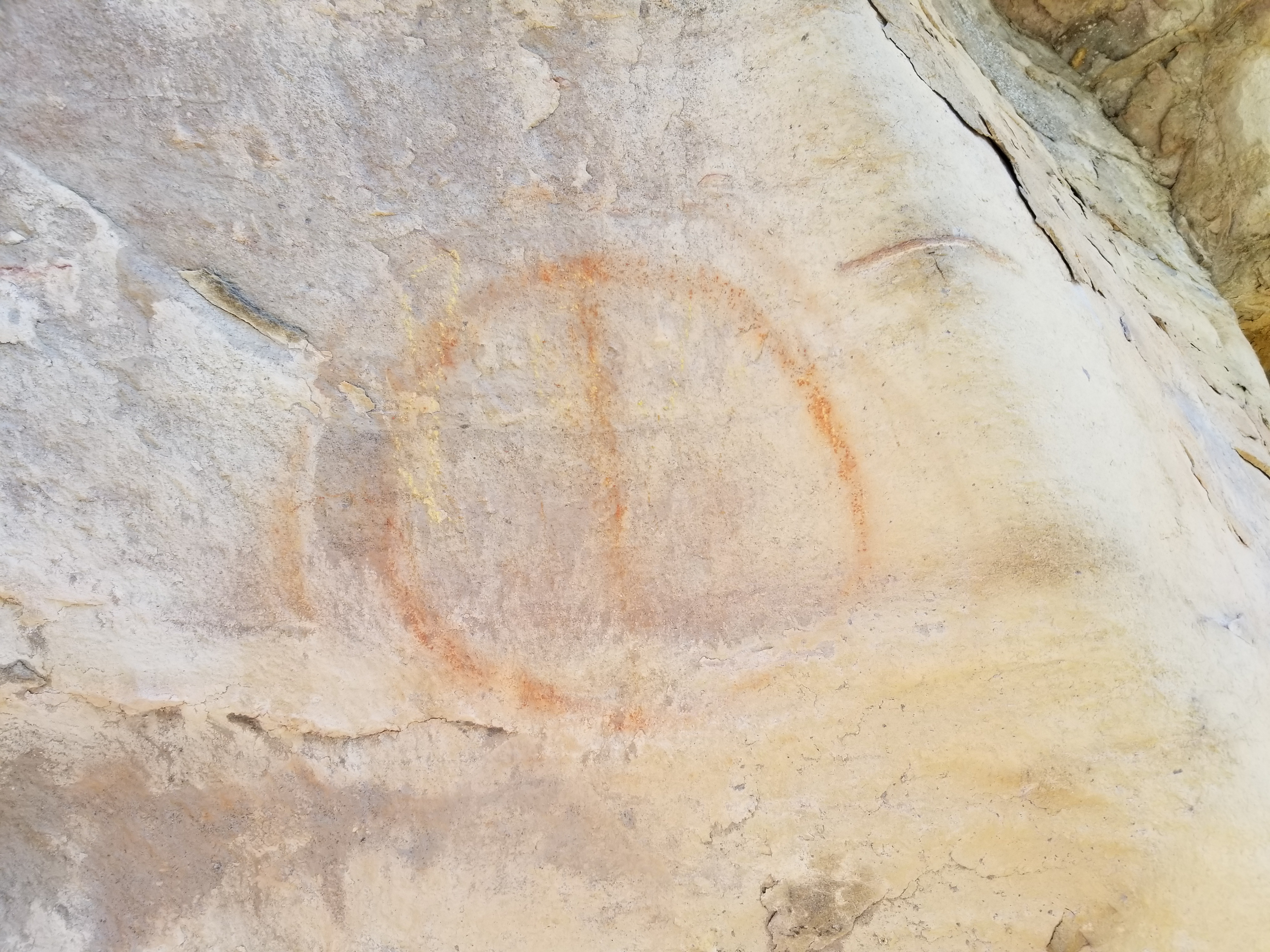
A pictograph of two concentric circles with a line through the inner circle.

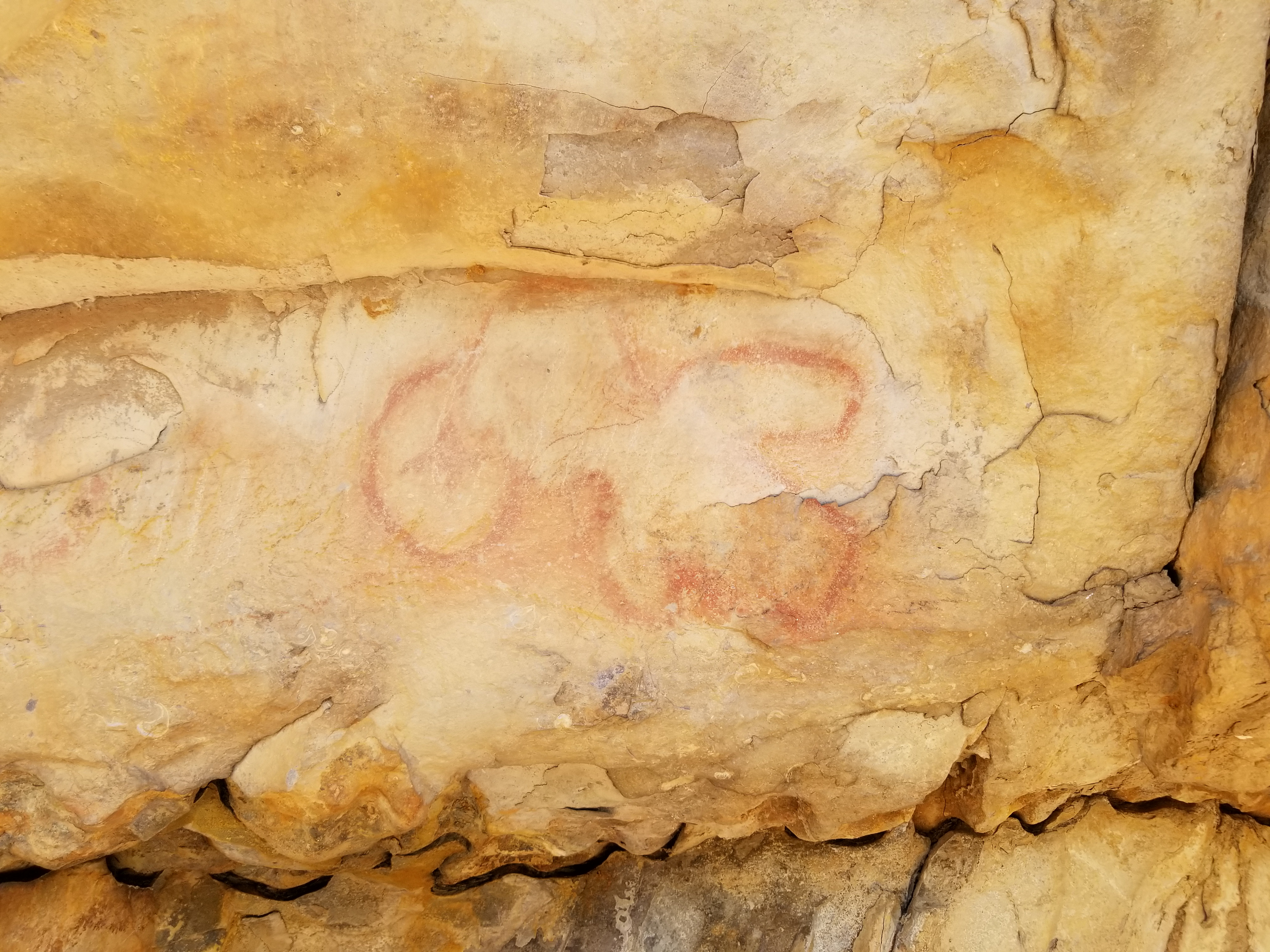
A pictograph of a human figure floating over a cross-in-circle.

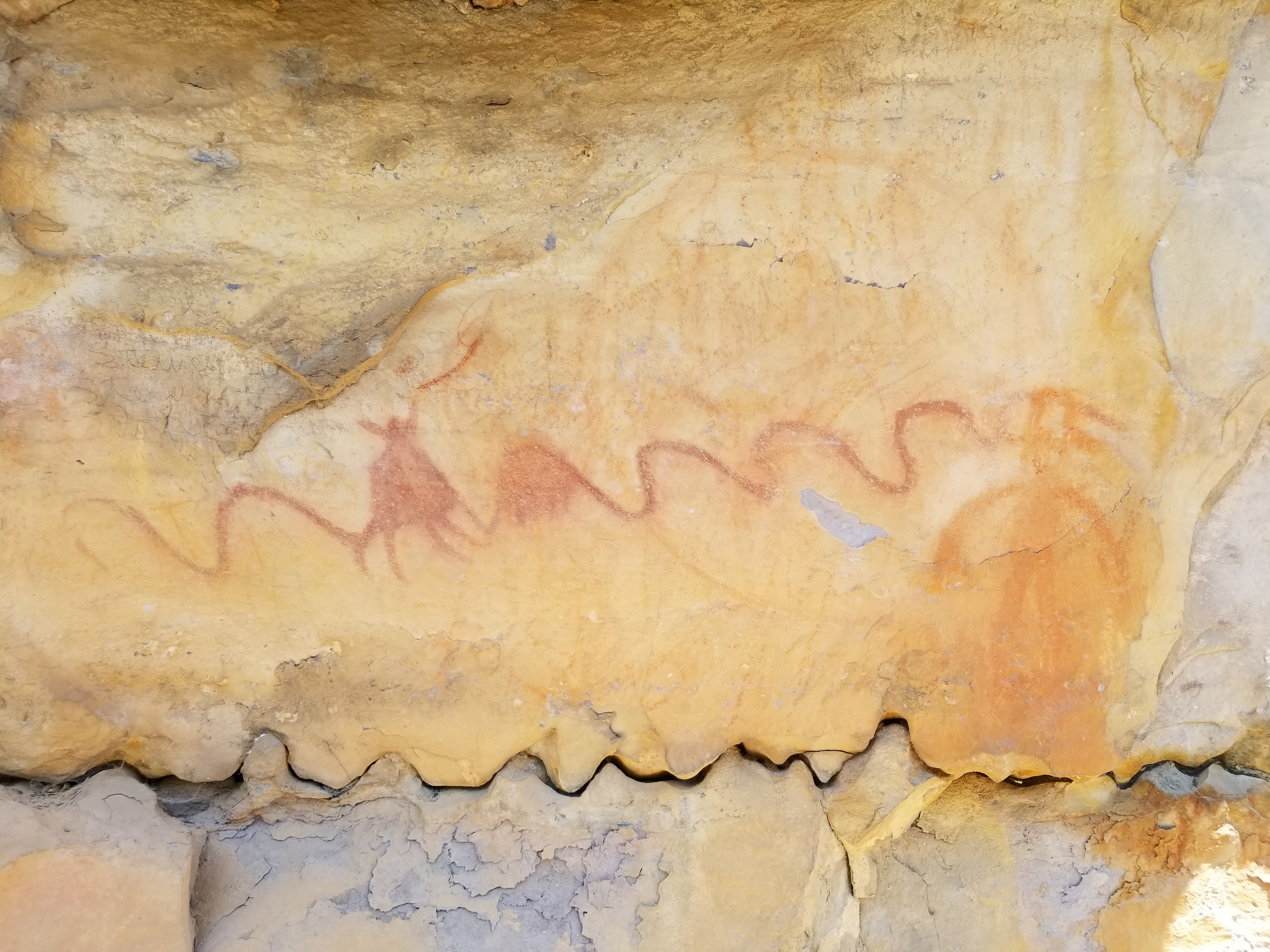
A red serpentine line with unidentified embedded forms, an orange circle, and an orange anthropomorphic figure.

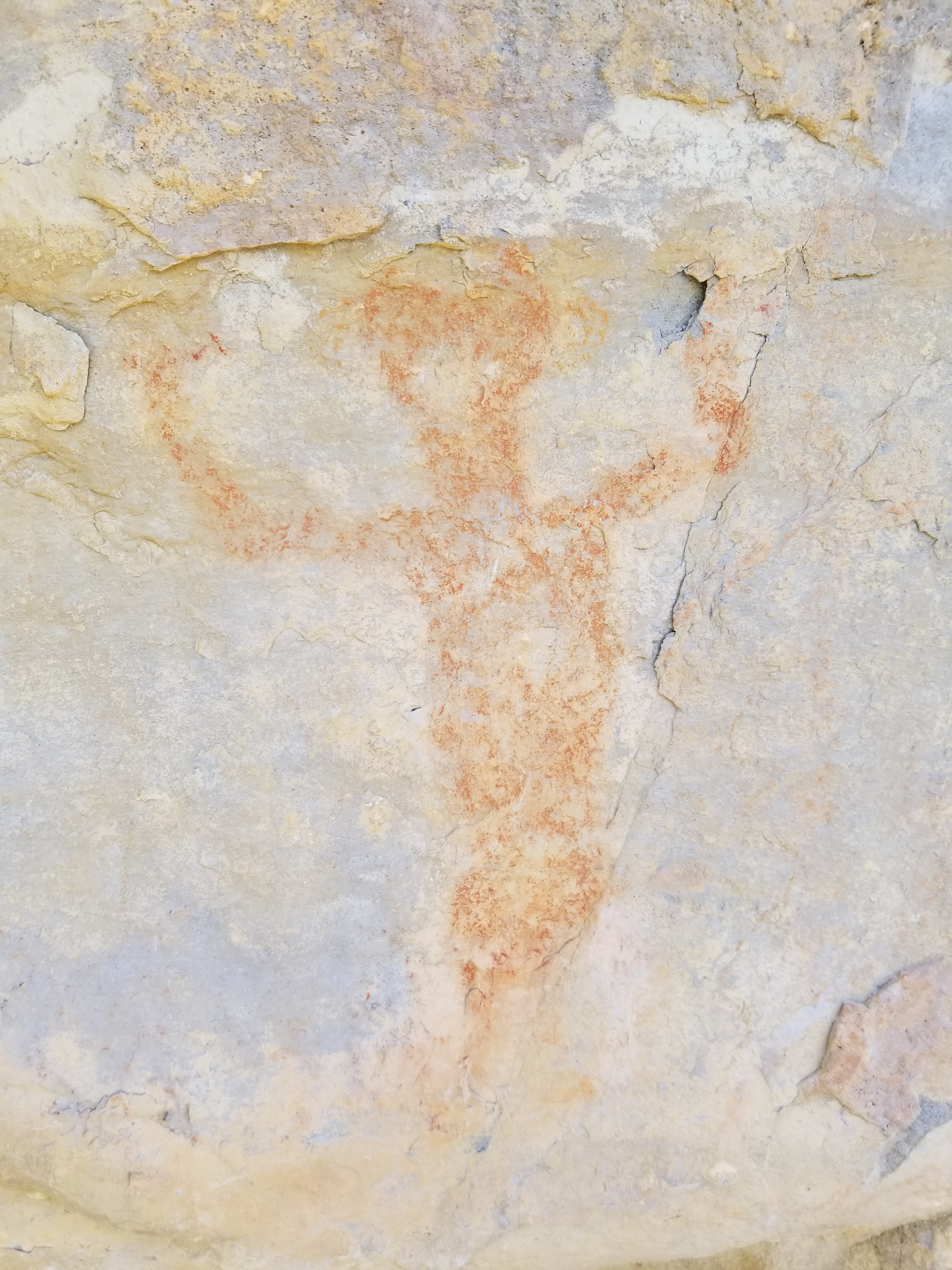
A red anthropomorphic figure with circular ear spools raising its arms.

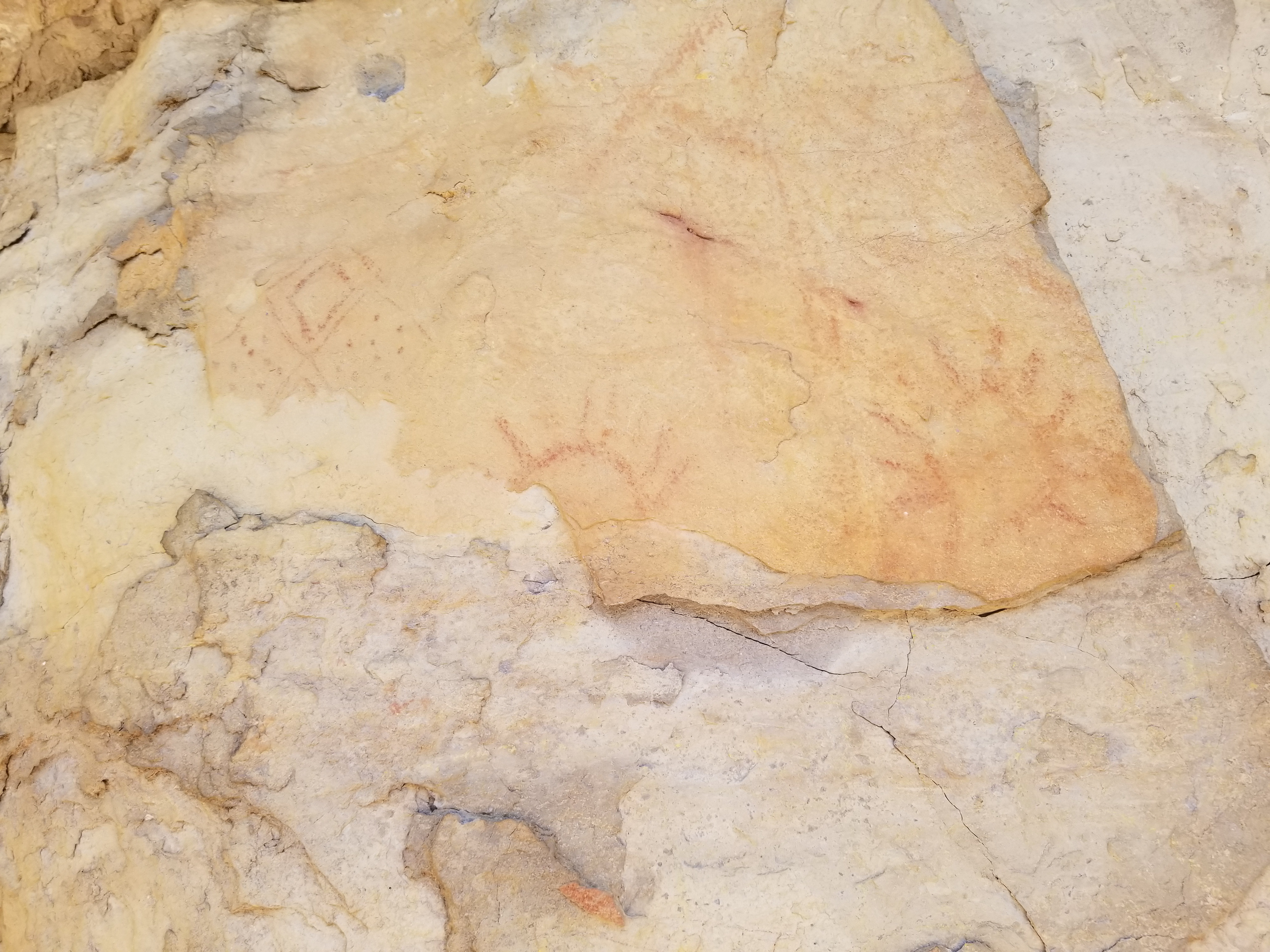
A grouping of pictographs. The leftmost pictograph consisting of rhombuses and dots has been classified as "Other" because it is the only such pictograph at Painted Bluff.

== See also ==
- Paint Rock Bluff — a cliff in Iowa along the Mississippi River that features Native American petroglyphs and pictographs.
- Russell Cave National Monument — a rock shelter and cave in northeastern Alabama that was once inhabited by Native Americans.

== Bibliography ==
- Diaz-Granados, Carol; Simek, Jan; Sabo, George; Wagner, Mark, eds. (2018). Transforming the Landscape: Rock Art and the Mississippian Cosmos (1st ed.). Oxbow Books. doi:10.2307/j.ctvh1drcx. ISBN 978-1-78570-628-8. JSTOR j.ctvh1drcx. Archived from the original on February 14, 2024.
- Pritchard, Erin E.; Ahlman, Todd M. (2009). TVA Archaeology: Seventy-Five Years of Prehistoric Site Research (1st ed.). University of Tennessee Press. ISBN 978-1-57233-650-6.
- Simek, Jan F.; Dunsmore, Erin E.; Loubser, Johannes; Bow, Sierra M. (February 23, 2021). The Cosmos Revealed: Precontact Mississippian Rock Art at Painted Bluff, Alabama (1st ed.). Tuscaloosa: University of Alabama Press. ISBN 978-0-8173-2085-0.
