= Places in Peril (South Dakota) =

South Dakota's Places in Peril chapter is part of a National Historic Preservation Month initiative that identifies and raises awareness for important places whose futures are in danger. The list is maintained by Preserve South Dakota, which was established in 1978. Among those on the list are the Belle Fourche Ingersoll Schoolhouse building, Deadwood's St. Ambrose Cemetery and Bear Butte.

== See also ==
- Places in Peril
