= Janney Furnace Park =

- Eli Henderson Park at Janney Furnace
- U.S. National Register of Historic Places
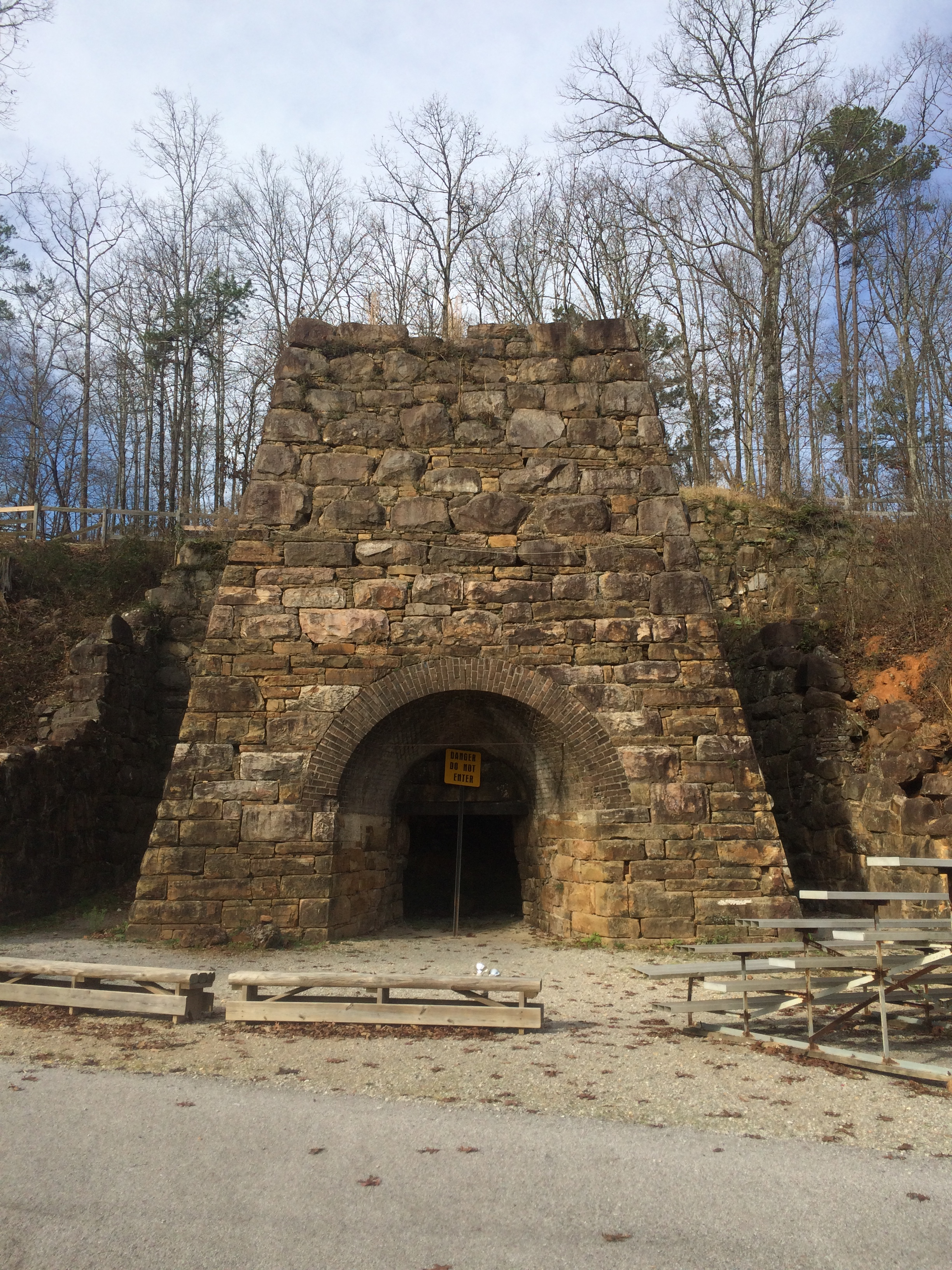
- The remaining stone structure of the blast furnace at Eli Henderson Park at Janney Furnace.

- Location within Alabama Location within the United States
- Nearest city: Ohatchee, Alabama
- Coordinates: 33°47′41″N 86°1′14″W
- Area: 3 acres (1.2 ha)
- Built: 1863
- NRHP reference No.: 76000315
- Added to NRHP: September 28, 1976

Eli Henderson Park at Janney Furnace is a park surrounding a fifty-foot tall stone furnace in Ohatchee, Alabama, United States. The furnace was built in 1863 by Alfred Janney to produce pig iron due to the prevalence of iron ore in what is now the park. A July 1864 Union raid destroyed all but the stone chimney, which still remains. The furnace is now surrounded by the Calhoun County Confederate Memorial, built by Sons of Confederate Veterans in June 2003; and the 2009 Confederate and Native American Museum, which includes Civil War and Native American artifacts dating back to the Iron Age. The Confederate Memorial is the world's largest black granite confederate memorial. The furnace was listed on the National Register of Historic Places in 1976 and the surrounding park was re-named in honor of Eli Henderson in 2020, who sought to preserve it.

== Gallery ==
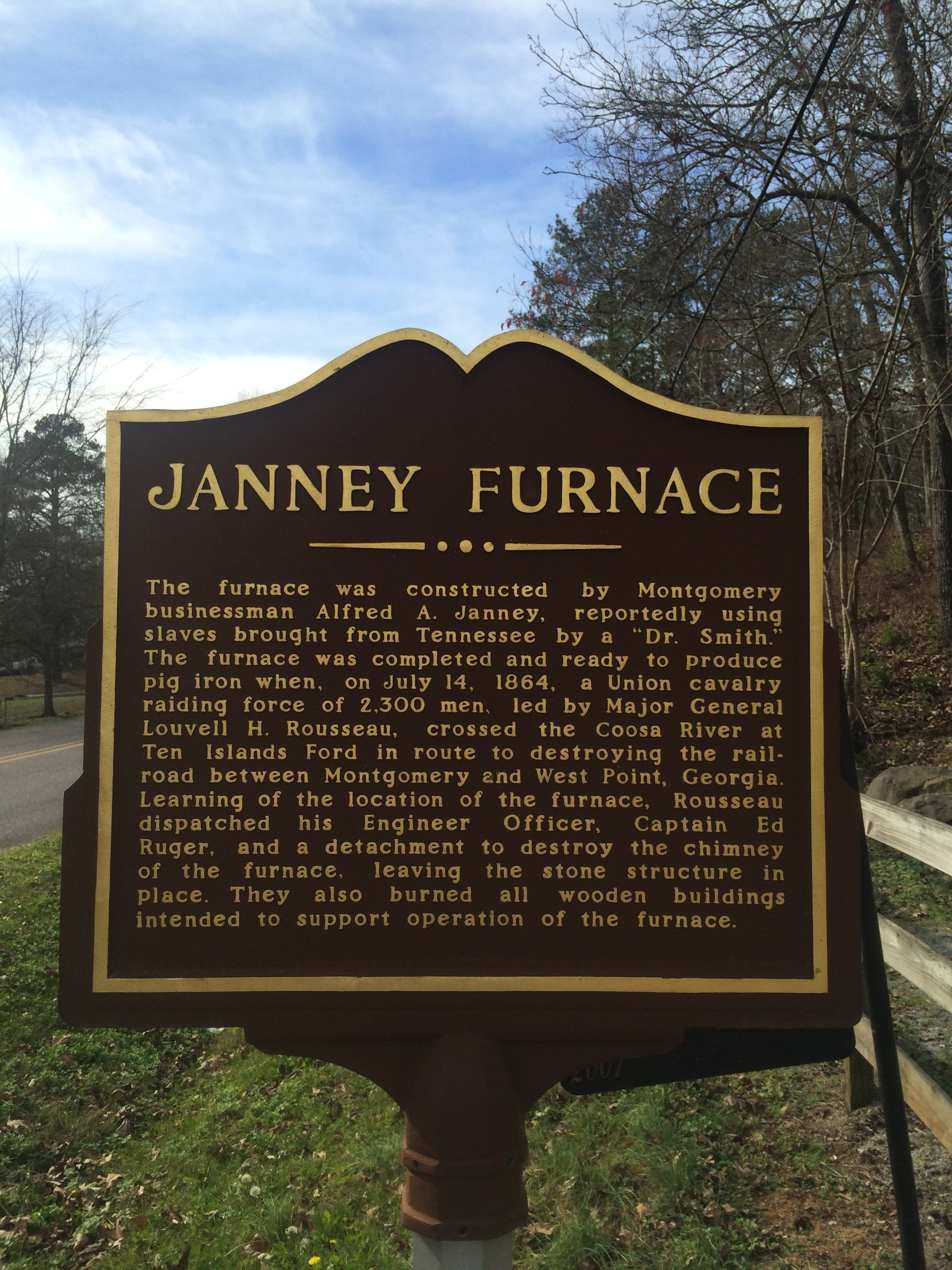
The descriptive plaque stating the history of Janney Furnace.

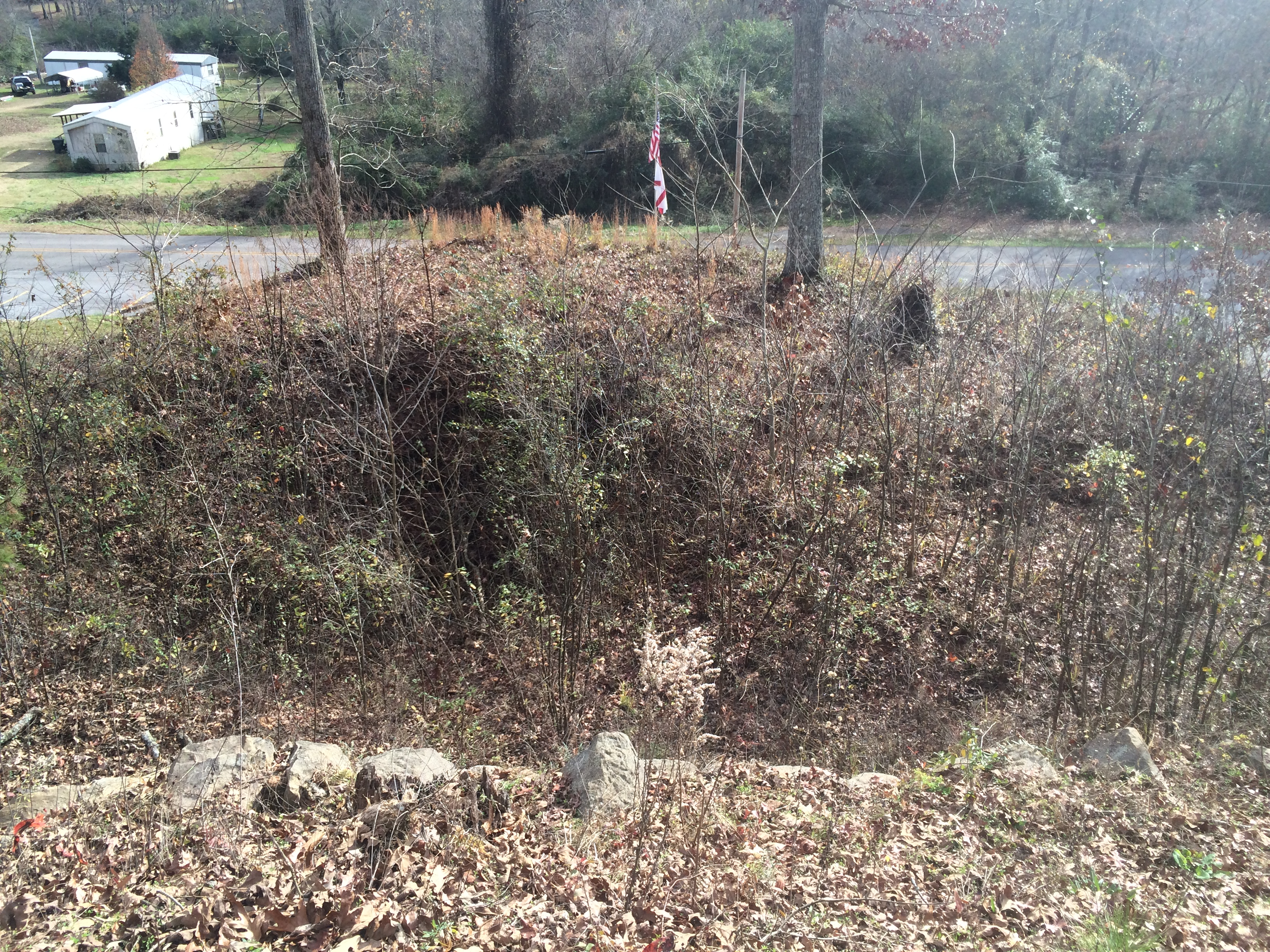
The reservoir (formerly filled with water) at Janney Furnace Park. The water in this reservoir powered a steam engine which ran the billows for the furnace. The reservoir was dug by hand.

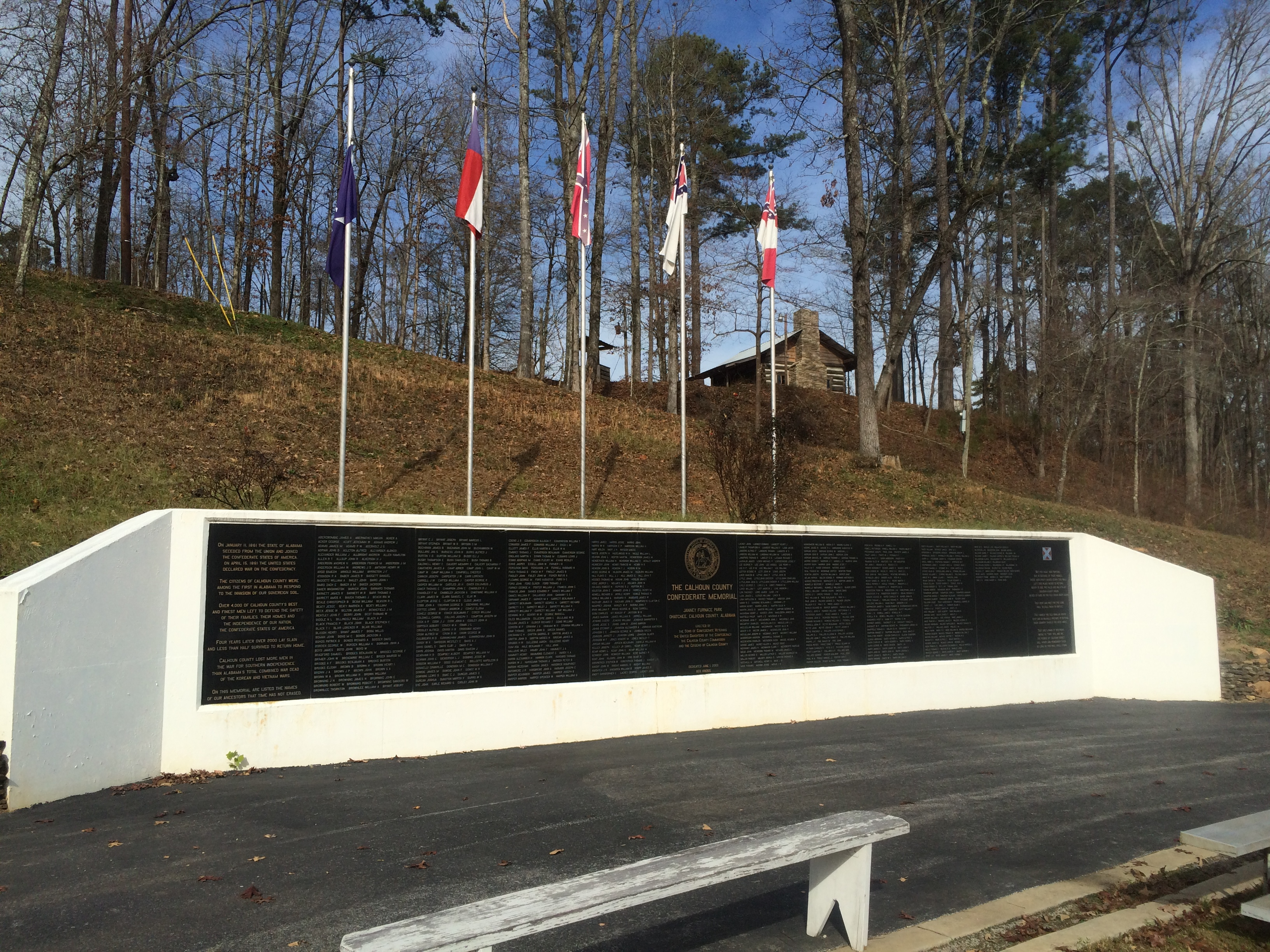
The black granite Calhoun County Confederate Memorial at Janney Furnace Park.

== See also ==
- List of Civil War Discovery Trail sites
