= Places in Peril =

Places in Peril is a program during National Historic Preservation Month program that identifies and raises awareness for important places whose futures are in danger. Among those states who have their own program are:

- Alabama
- Durham, North Carolina
- Georgia
- South Dakota
