= Ingersoll Schoolhouse =

The Ingersoll Schoolhouse is located on U.S. Route 212 east of Belle Fourche, South Dakota and was built in 1890 at a time when one room schoolhouses were very common in South Dakota. It remained in use as a school through 1971.

Due to highway development, the schoolhouse was selected for preservation by Preserve South Dakota in 2012 under their Places in Peril initiative.
