= Prater's Mill =

- U.S. National Register of Historic Places
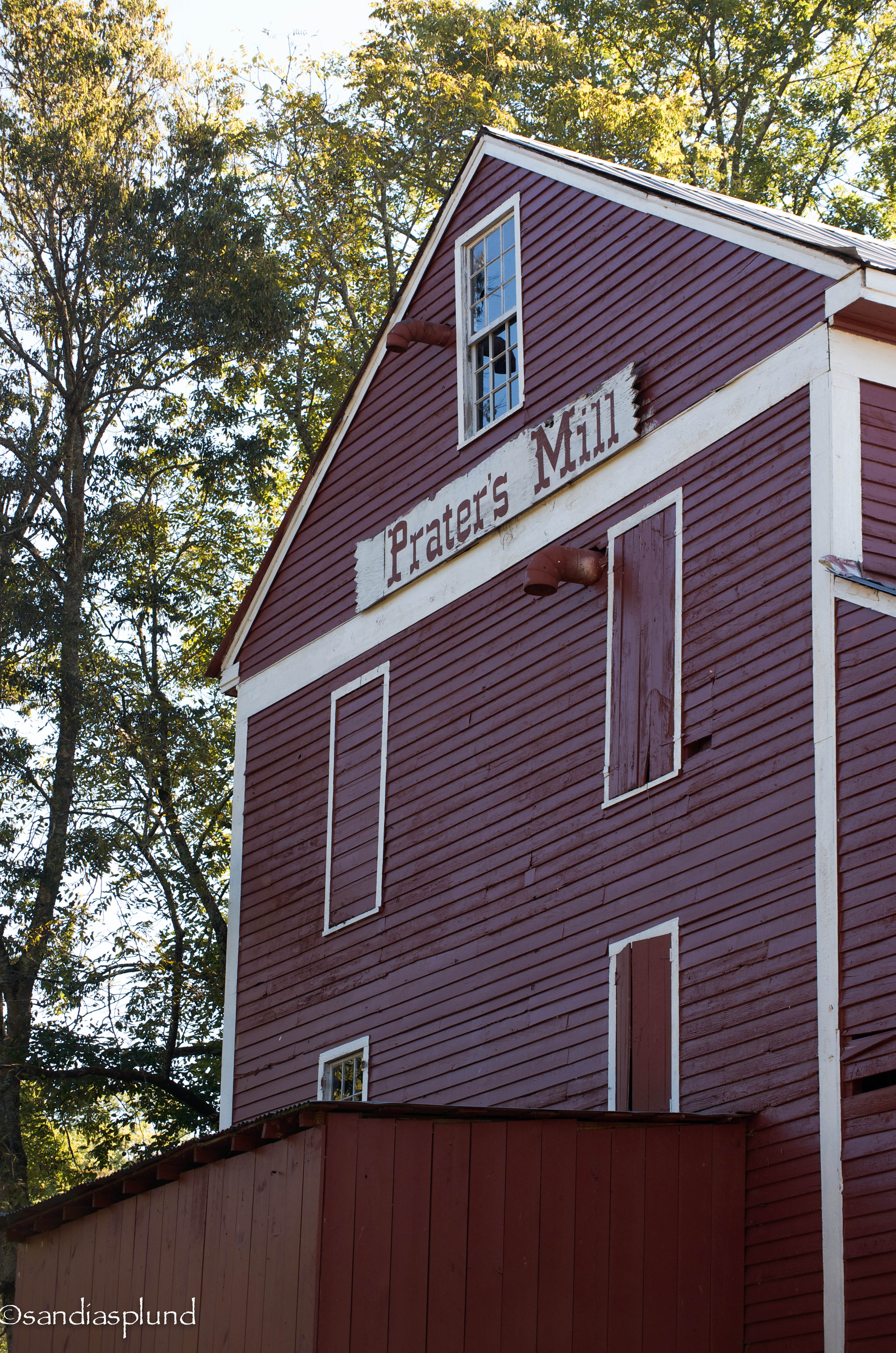

- Location within Georgia Location within the United States
- Nearest city: Dalton, Georgia
- Coordinates: 34°53′45″N 84°55′20″W
- Area: 77 acres (31 ha)
- Built: 1855
- NRHP reference No.: 78001010
- Added to NRHP: April 25, 1978

Prater's Mill was built in the mid-19th century. It is located in Whitfield county, near Varnell, Georgia. Serving the city of Dalton as a working mill, it is now used as the center piece of a country fair that showcases cultural history of Southern Appalachia. The country fair consists of mountain music, Southern foods, and living history exhibits and the handmade crafts and original art. Crafts include blacksmithing, spinning, quilting, rug hooking, woodcarving, and hand tufting.

== History ==
Prater's Mill is one of 70,000 properties on the National Register of Historic Places. Included in the list are all historic areas within the National Park System, over 2,200 National Historic Landmarks, and properties across the nation that have been nominated for the honor.

The mill's heritage runs back to the Cherokee Indians. It was built by Benjamin Franklin Prater in 1855. The water-powered mill was originally fitted with the latest in grain cleaning, grinding and sifting machinery, all powered by the Coahulla Creek. As the mill's popularity grew, Prater added a cotton gin, a saw mill, a wool carder, a syrup mill, a general store, and a blacksmiths shop. For almost a hundred years, farmers would line up with their mules and wagons early in the morning to get their turn with the millers.

During the American Civil War, the mill was used as campsites for both sides of the war. While used by the Union army, the mill was considered a valuable source for food so it was not destroyed. The Prater family ran the mill until the 1950s. A succession of miller's ran the mill until the 1960s. In 1971, the all-volunteer Prater's Mill Foundation took over the mill and began extensive restoration and preservation efforts. Today the mill is best known for the arts and crafts festival held the second full weekend of October. Throughout the year, the grounds are a popular site for fishing, cookouts, family reunions and other special events.

On May 20, 1995, fire was intentionally set on the north side of the mill. Two arson convictions have been made to date. Most of the damage was on the inside of the mill. The force of the fire blew out most of the windows, damaged the roof, siding, electrical system, and destroyed an antique display case.
