= Museum of Southern History =

History museum in Jacksonville, Florida

Coordinates: 30.283°N 81.71374°W

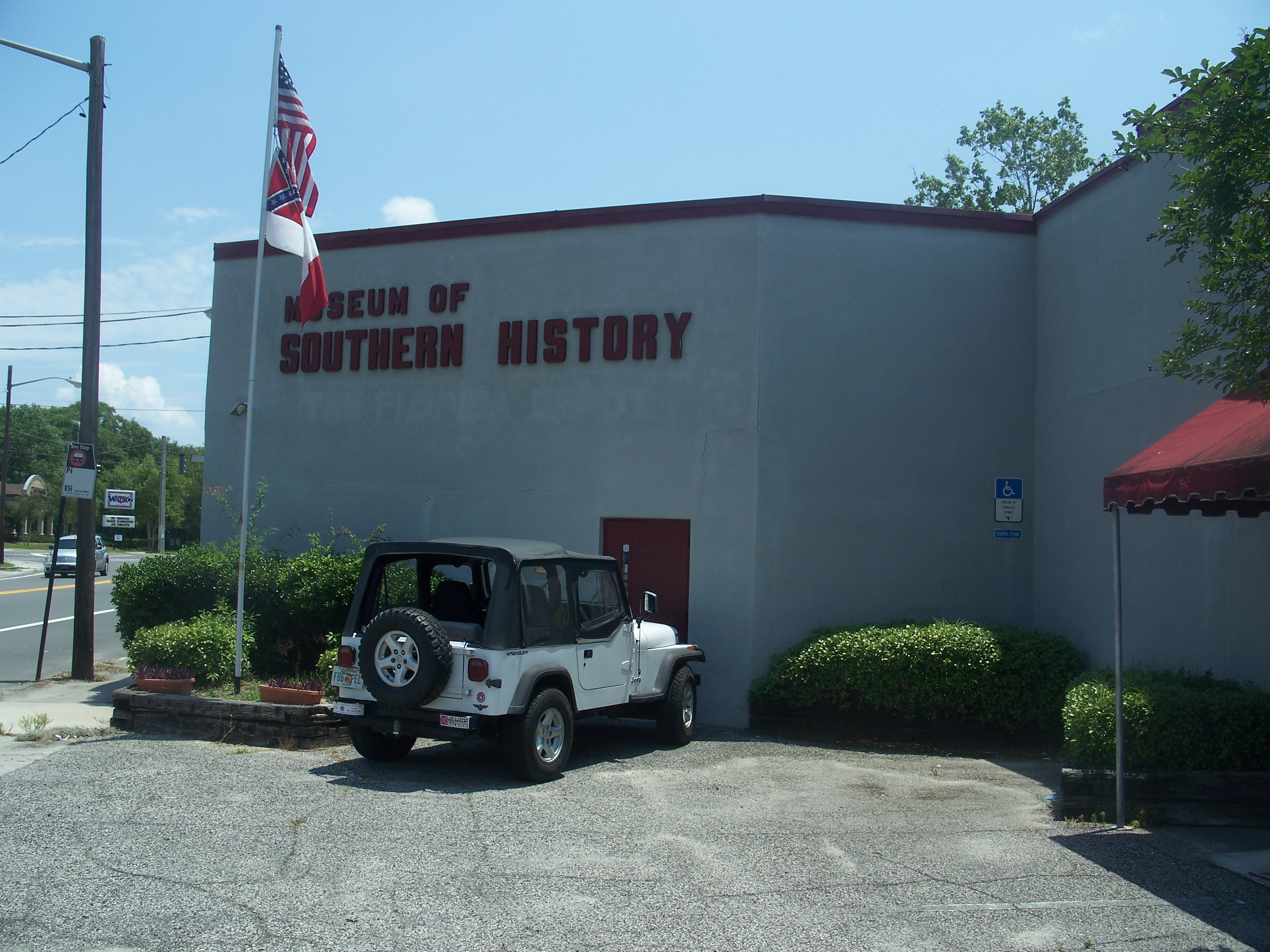
Museum of Southern History

The Museum of Southern History also known as the G. Howard Bryan Museum of Southern History was located in Jacksonville, Florida, Duval County, Florida. It was located at 4304 Herschel Street. The museum depicted lifestyles and culture from the antebellum South and included a research library for genealogy. Its research library housed 5,000 volumes. Its permanent collection included clothing and other artifacts from the Civil War era. Items included the flag which draped Abraham Lincoln's coffin, which was put up for auction in 2024 following the museum's loss of its lease.
