= Waveland State Historic Site =

- Waveland
- U.S. National Register of Historic Places
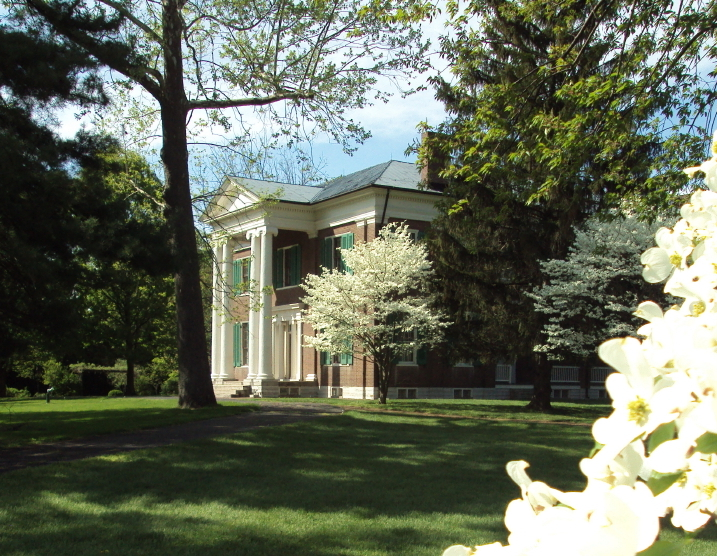

- Location within Kentucky Location within the United States
- Nearest city: Lexington, Kentucky
- Coordinates: 37°58′17″N 84°32′14″W
- Built: 1845
- Architectural style: Greek Revival
- NRHP reference No.: 71000342
- Added to NRHP: August 12, 1971

Waveland State Historic Site, also known as the Joseph Bryan House, in Lexington, Kentucky is the site of a Greek Revival home and 10 acres now maintained and operated as part of the Kentucky state park system. It was the home of the Joseph Bryan family, their descendants and the people they enslaved in the nineteenth century. Bryan's father William had befriended Daniel Boone and they migrated west through the Cumberland Gap.

Joseph Bryan, William's grandson, became an early planter here and established a plantation for tobacco and hemp as commodity crops. He also began to breed thoroughbred race horses. settler and horseman of this region.

== History ==
The Daniel Boone and William Bryan families met in the Yadkin River valley, North Carolina, where they lived near each other. William Bryan married Mary Boone, a sister of Daniel Boone. William and Mary had a son, Daniel Boone Bryan. Daniel Boone surveyed the land in what became Kentucky that he would give to his nephew, Daniel Boone Bryan. The young man became known as a historian, frontiersman, and poet. Boone surveyed a large area of about 2,000 acres (810 ha) about six miles from present-day downtown Lexington, Kentucky.

=== Daniel Boone Bryan ===
Daniel Boone Bryan settled this land around 1786. The property was later named Waveland for the appearance of the fields of grain and hemp when the wind blew through them. Central Kentucky, known as the Bluegrass Region, had the largest hemp and rope producers of the nation in the nineteenth century. When Bryan first moved to his property, he built a small stone cabin.

=== Joseph Bryan ===
Daniel Boone Bryan's son, Joseph, inherited Waveland and constructed the Big House of the plantation about 1844 to 1848. He had married Elizabeth Turner, and they eventually had twelve children together. Bryan decided to build a classic Greek Revival structure. Inspired by the work of Lexington architect John McMurtry, Bryan hired Washington Allen, a well-known Lexington contractor, to oversee the construction of his new home.

It had a portico and spacious entry hall. The main doorway of the mansion is considered to be an exact replica of the doorway of the north entrance to the Erechtheion at the Acropolis in Athens, Greece. A porch was built on either side of the house, with views to surrounding country side. The rooms were constructed to be fourteen-feet-high on the first floor, making them cooler in summer.

As did many planters, who essentially had to operate self-sufficient villages, Bryan had developed minor industries on his plantation. A gunsmith shop employed twenty-five men at one time; he manufactured saltpeter and gunpowder. Both a gristmill and paper mill (which also processed lumber) were operated on the plantation, as were a blacksmith shop, and a distillery. (Kentucky was known for its bourbon.) He was able to manage all of these successfully.

Bryan also allowed space on the plantation for a Baptist church and a private female seminary. There was no public education in Kentucky until it was established during the Reconstruction era.

As was typical of many large plantations with in-house industries, Bryan drew from his own products for construction of the house. The lumber was harvested and trimmed at Waveland, the wrought iron was made at his blacksmith, the bricks used in the buildings were made from clay gathered on the land, and fired in a kiln on site. Stones for the house's foundation and some decorative work were quarried and dressed at Tyrone on the Kentucky River and moved to Waveland. To reduce construction costs, Bryan had the stairway rail built from flat pieces of wood instead of rounded ones. His wife wanted expensive marble baseboards, but Bryan used cheaper stones and had them painted to look like marble.

Joseph Bryan constructed his office with seven doors, each for a different part of his life. One door connected to the formal dining room, where he and guests would eat. One door led into the family parlor, where he could be with his children.

Another door, which locked from his office, was to stairs to two second-floor rooms that he rented out to travelers. He made sure he could lock the strangers in for his family's safety. The travelers could not leave their room until Joseph Bryan unlocked the door, so he was safe from being robbed or attacked by them at night.

Another door led outside to the back of the house and outbuildings, and the fields where enslaved African Americans worked. Thus he had quick access and easier communication with them. Another door led from his office to the road by which businessmen would arrive to see him. As a successful businessman in Kentucky, Bryan was often visited by others. The remaining two doors were closets, which he used as safes.

In the antebellum years, the Bryans were slaveholders. They held thirteen slaves, three women and ten men. The women conducted all the domestic work of cleaning the house, laundering and ironing clothes and linens, as well as to process meat and produce, and do all the cooking. Margaret Cartmell Bryan, Joseph's wife, made the clothing for the slaves and for her own family. The invention of the sewing machine significantly reduced the time it took her to make clothing.

The male slaves worked the farm. Each one had to keep 20 acres (8.1 ha) of land. In order to save time traveling, the Bryans allowed the slaves to build houses on the property they kept. The slaves at Waveland enjoyed freedoms that were uncommon for other slaves of the day. When they were not working, they were allowed to hunt for themselves. They were also allowed to buy and sell produce, meat and other goods at the local markets, and to keep any profits. Joseph Bryan allowed the slaves to keep weapons. The slave quarters were two bricks thick, making them better insulated than many homes in Kentucky.

Joseph Bryan supported the Confederacy during the Civil War and gave them supplies such as horses and food produced on his land. When Union authorities discovered this, they sought to arrest him. Bryan fled to Canada, returning years later after the war had ended. The slaves at Waveland were emancipated at war's end, but most chose to stay and continue working for Bryan. He paid them for their labor, and charged them rent.

=== Joseph Henry Bryan ===
Joseph Henry Bryan, one of Bryan's eleven children, lost his house, so he and his wife and children moved back into Waveland with his father. Eventually, Joseph Bryan Sr. moved out, leaving Joseph Henry Bryan as the owner of Waveland.

He developed horse racing stock and established Waveland as one of the premier thoroughbred and standardbred (trotters) farms in Kentucky. Waveland produced some great horses such as "Waveland Chief", "Ben-Hur", "Eric", "Olaf" and "Wild Rake", who never lost a heat and was sold to William Rockefeller for $7800 in the 1880s. Joseph Henry Bryan also built a race track across from the mansion. He and other businessmen watched the races from near the track. This was not considered a suitable environment for women of their class, and Bryan's wife, daughters and female guests would often go up to the top floor of the house and watch the races with their binoculars.

Joseph Henry Bryan was a notorious gambler. In less than seven years, he lost over one million dollars. Another family member had to sell their home so that they could try to keep Joseph Henry Bryan from losing the Waveland property. Eventually, however, Bryan was unable to pay his debt. For this, he was never forgiven by his family. He had to sell the house at auction just to try to pay off his debt.

Salle A. Scott bought Waveland in 1894. She sold the property in 1899 to James A Hullet. In 1956, the Commonwealth of Kentucky bought the house and about 200 acres (81 ha) of the original 2,000 acres (810 ha) for preservation (the house) and use by the University of Kentucky of the larger farmland for research and experimental agriculture.

== Museum ==
In 1957, Waveland was adapted as a historic house museum. Its exhibits depict and interpret Kentucky life from pioneer days to the Civil War. Ten acres are included with the house property, which has been renovated and furnished to show antebellum life on a plantation during the 1840s. Period-appropriate furniture was donated to the site. Many of the ancillary buildings did not survive the decades after the Civil War.

Waveland's buildings include the mansion, decorated in antebellum style, and four outbuildings: the ice house, a two-story brick building that was the slavequarters, a barn, and a smokehouse.

Tours are given daily for much of the year, and tour guides dress in the style of the 1840s. Tours include the historic house, the slave quarters, smokehouse and ice house. They focus on the Bryan family and life on a 19th-century Bluegrass Kentucky plantation.
