= Places in Peril (Alabama) =

Historic preservation program

Places in Peril is a program of the Alabama Historical Commission and the Alabama Trust for Historic Preservation that identifies the historic and archaeological sites in Alabama that are considered at risk. Founded in 1994, each year's list is announced during National Historic Preservation Month. The lists are created, in part, due to the relative importance of each site and the degree of risk faced. Of the more than two hundred sites highlighted in twenty years, more than three quarters are still standing.

Among the locations in Alabama that have been highlighted are: 1 Wood Manor in Tuscaloosa, Old Grace Church in Sheffield, and Painted Bluff in Marshall County.

== See also ==
- Places in Peril (disambiguation)
