= Parks, Arizona =

CDP in Coconino County, Arizona

- CDP
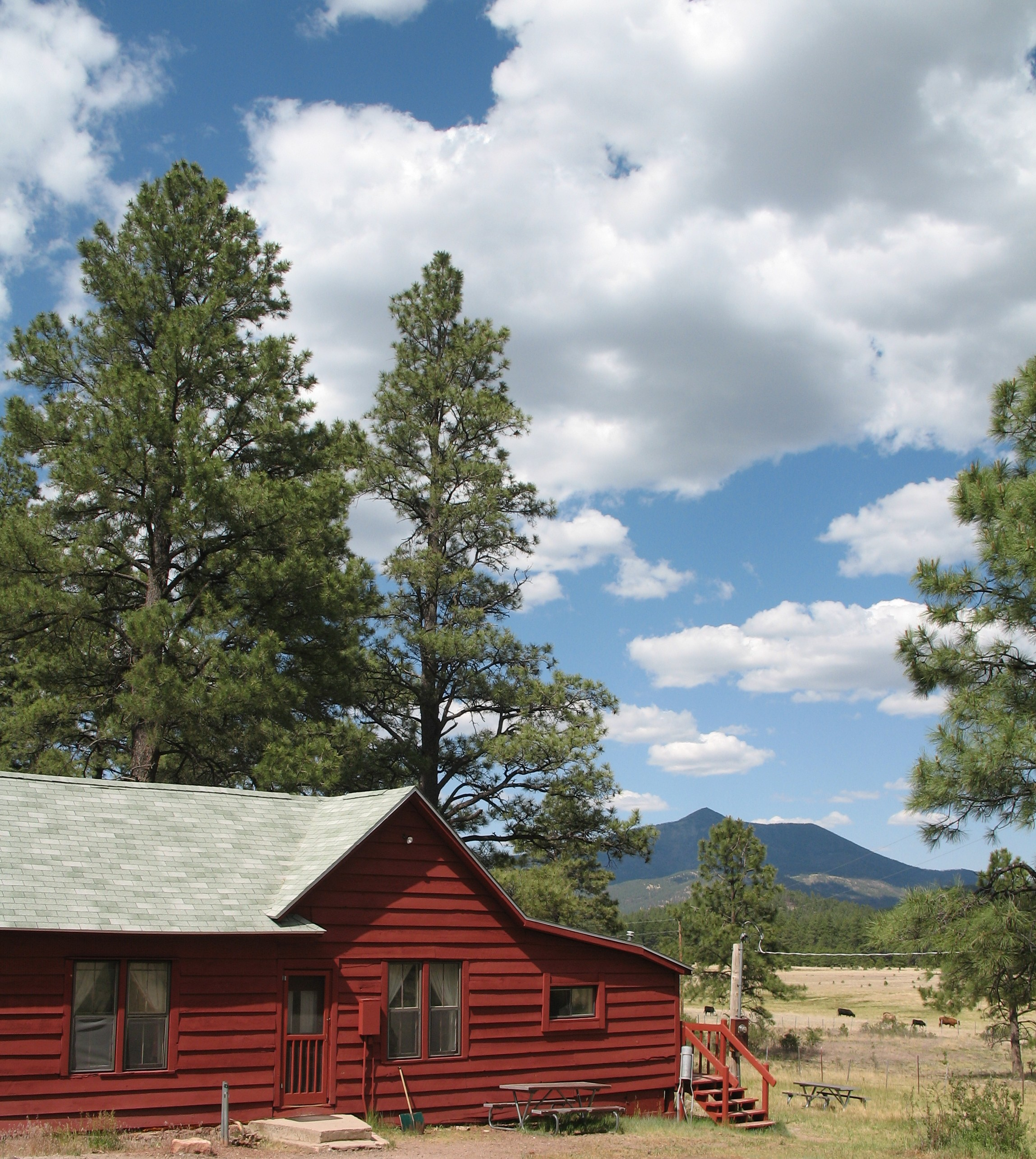
- Historic Spring Valley Cabin near Parks

- Location in Coconino County and the state of Arizona

- Location in the United States
- Coordinates: 35°17′29″N 111°57′32″W
- Country: United States
- State: Arizona
- County: Coconino

Area
  - Total: 169.92 sq mi (440.09 km^{2})
  - Land: 169.90 sq mi (440.03 km^{2})
  - Water: 0.023 sq mi (0.06 km^{2})
- Elevation: 7,304 ft (2,226 m)

Population (2020)
  - Total: 1,382
  - Density: 8.1/sq mi (3.14/km^{2})
- Time zone: UTC-7 (MST)
- ZIP code: 86018
- Area code: 928
- FIPS code: 04-53350
- GNIS feature ID: 2409033
- Website: www.city-data.com/city/Parks-Arizona.html

Parks is a census-designated place (CDP) in Coconino County, Arizona, United States. The population was 1,188 at the 2010 census.

== Geography ==
According to the United States Census Bureau, the CDP has a total area of 172.4 square miles (446.4 km^{2}), of which 172.3 square miles (446.3 km^{2}) is land and 0.02 square miles (0.06 km^{2}), or 0.01%, is water.

== Demographics ==
Historical population
Census	Pop.	Note	%±
2020	1,382		—
U.S. Decennial Census

=== 2020 census ===
As of the 2020 census, Parks had a population of 1,382. The median age was 52.4 years. 16.2% of residents were under the age of 18 and 23.2% of residents were 65 years of age or older. For every 100 females there were 106.9 males, and for every 100 females age 18 and over there were 105.7 males age 18 and over.

0.0% of residents lived in urban areas, while 100.0% lived in rural areas.

There were 603 households in Parks, of which 16.6% had children under the age of 18 living in them. Of all households, 56.9% were married-couple households, 19.4% were households with a male householder and no spouse or partner present, and 17.1% were households with a female householder and no spouse or partner present. About 25.2% of all households were made up of individuals and 14.4% had someone living alone who was 65 years of age or older.

There were 1,134 housing units, of which 46.8% were vacant. The homeowner vacancy rate was 4.2% and the rental vacancy rate was 0.0%.

Racial composition as of the 2020 census
Race	Number	Percent
White	1,191	86.2%
Black or African American	18	1.3%
American Indian and Alaska Native	32	2.3%
Asian	5	0.4%
Native Hawaiian and Other Pacific Islander	11	0.8%
Some other race	27	2.0%
Two or more races	98	7.1%
Hispanic or Latino (of any race)	92	6.7%

=== 2000 census ===
As of the census of 2000, there were 1,137 people, 462 households, and 342 families residing in the CDP. The population density was 6.6 inhabitants per square mile (2.5/km^{2}). There were 918 housing units at an average density of 5.3 per square mile (2.0/km^{2}). The racial makeup of the CDP was 93.7% White, 0.4% Black or African American, 0.7% Native American, 0.4% Asian, 0.5% Pacific Islander, 1.8% from other races, and 2.6% from two or more races. 5.2% of the population were Hispanic or Latino of any race.

There were 462 households, out of which 29.2% had children under the age of 18 living with them, 63.6% were married couples living together, 5.8% had a female householder with no husband present, and 25.8% were non-families. 18.6% of all households were made up of individuals, and 5.4% had someone living alone who was 65 years of age or older. The average household size was 2.46 and the average family size was 2.78.

In the CDP, the age distribution of the population shows 22.6% under the age of 18, 3.9% from 18 to 24, 29.2% from 25 to 44, 34.3% from 45 to 64, and 10.0% who were 65 years of age or older. The median age was 43 years. For every 100 females, there were 109.0 males. For every 100 females age 18 and over, there were 106.6 males.

The median income for a household in the CDP was $39,886, and the median income for a family was $45,000. Males had a median income of $34,500 versus $27,875 for females. The per capita income for the CDP was $19,377. About 6.4% of families and 9.2% of the population were below the poverty line, including 9.6% of those under age 18 and 5.7% of those age 65 or over.

== Education ==
Parks is served by the Maine Consolidated Elementary School District.

== Transportation ==
Parks is located along Interstate 40.
