= Fort Dickerson Park =

Nature preserve in Knox County, Tennessee, United States

- Interactive map of Fort Dickerson Park
- Location: Knoxville, Tennessee
- Coordinates: 35°56′46″N 83°55′0″W
- Created: 1957
- Open: Year-round

Fort Dickerson Park is an 85-acre (0.34 km^{2}) nature park in Knoxville, Tennessee, United States. Originally built as a Union fort to protect Knoxville during the Civil War in 1863, it became a park in the 21st century, featuring 4 miles (6.4 km) of natural trail, the Earthen Fort, and a public swimming access dock at Augusta Quarry.

== History ==
Fort Dickerson, built atop a 300-foot-high ridge overlooking the Tennessee River, was one of sixteen earthen forts and battery emplacements built by the Federal army to protect Knoxville during the Civil War. General Joseph Wheeler ordered his Confederate troops to attack it on November 15, 1863, but the assault was canceled due to unfavorable terrain and artillery conditions.

It was declared a public park in 1957, and in 1963 it was the site of a centennial re-enactment. In the early 21st century, it was renewed thanks to funds granted by the Aslan Foundation and the City of Knoxville.

== Facilities ==
Augusta Quarry in 2026.

The park comprises the Augusta Quarry and the Earthen Fort:

=== Augusta Quarry ===
City Quarry, as it was often known, operated here from the mid-1930s through the 1970s. According to the Tennessee Division of Geology, the quarry produced curbstone, stone blocks for architecture, and crushed stone for road projects. The quarry lake was officially opened for swimming in 2017. Today, Augusta Quarry is one of two local quarries open to swimming.

=== Earthen Fort ===
The Chapman Highway entrance to Fort Dickerson Park has two significant points of interest. Entering the park, one can find a scenic view over the quarry lake from the top of one of the park's higher points.

At the top of the hill is one of the best-preserved examples of Civil War-era earthen fortifications. These breastworks, overlooking Knoxville, highlight the park's history and its significance to the outcome of the Civil War.
