= U.S. Cavalry Museum =

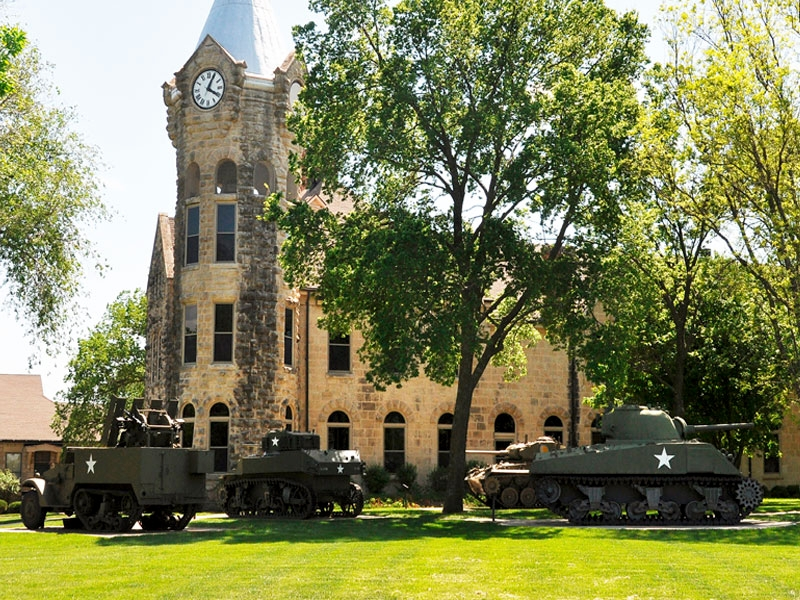

- Location within Kansas
- Location: Fort Riley, Kansas, United States
- Coordinates: 39°03′47″N 96°46′53″W
- Type: Military museum
- Curator: Robert J. Smith
- Website: history.army.mil/Army-Museum-Enterprise/Find-an-Army-Museum/US-Cavalry-Museum/

The U.S. Cavalry Museum is a museum located on Fort Riley in Fort Riley, Kansas, United States.

The Museum Division is responsible for exhibiting and interpreting the history of Fort Riley from its establishment to the present, to include its various schools, major commands, and community life. To support post education, training, research, and historical programs, the museum provides educational programs and services. The museum is housed in the original base hospital building, which was built in 1855.

== Exhibits ==
The museum covers this history of the U.S. Cavalry from the Revolutionary War until the end of the mounted era in 1942.

== Visitor restrictions ==
The U. S. Cavalry Museum is located on the Fort Riley Military Post. In order to visit the museum you must pass through a security check point where you will be ask to show a photo id and a valid vehicle registration. In addition your vehicle MAY be searched.
