= Morten =

- Gender: Male

Origin
- Origin: Latin
- Meaning: Of Mars, Warlike

Other names
- Related names: Martin, Martyn, Marta, Martina

Morten is a common male given name in Denmark and Norway. Approximately 22,138 have this name as a given name in Norway and about 52 people have it as a surname. The origin of the surname is less clear. Notable people with the name include:

== People with the given name ==
- Morten Abel, Norwegian singer
- Morten Andersen, Danish kicker in American football
- Morten Arnfred, Danish film director and screenwriter
- Morten Berglia, Norwegian orienteering competitor
- Morten Berre, Norwegian footballer
- Morten Bertolt, Danish footballer
- Morten Bisgaard, Danish footballer
- Morten Bjørlo, Norwegian footballer
- Morten Bo, Danish photographer
- Morten Breum, Danish DJ and producer known by his mononym Morten
- Morten Bruun, Danish football player
- Morten Brørs, Norwegian cross-country skier
- Morten Børup, Danish educator
- Morten Christensen, several people
- Morten Christiansen, multiple people
- Morten Christoffersen (born 1968), Danish windsurfer
- Morten Daland, Norwegian handball player
- Morten Djupvik, Norwegian show jumping competitor
- Morten Dons, Danish racing driver
- Morten Drægni, Norwegian politician
- Morten Eriksen, Norwegian footballer
- Morten Finstad, Norwegian ice hockey player
- Morten Frendrup, Danish footballer
- Morten Frisch, Danish epidemiologist
- Morten Frost, Danish badminton player and coach
- Morten Furuly, Norwegian musician
- Morten Grunwald, Danish actor and theater manager
- Morten Harket, Norwegian singer and leader of the band a-ha
- Morten Hegreberg, Norwegian cyclist
- Morten Hjulmand, Danish footballer
- Morten Jensen, several people
- Morten Klessen (born 1969), Danish politician
- Morten Kolbjørnsen, Norwegian politician
- Morten Konradsen, Norwegian footballer
- Morten Korch, Danish author
- Morten Kringelbach (born 1970), Danish neuroscientist
- Morten Krogvold, Norwegian photographer and writer
- Morten Lange, Danish botanist and politician
- Morten Lauridsen, American composer
- Morten Løkkegaard, Danish journalist and TV host
- Morten Messerschmidt, Danish politician
- Morten Moldskred, Norwegian footballer
- Morten Nielsen (disambiguation)
- Morten Nordstrand, Danish footballer
- Morten Olsen, Danish football player and coach
- Morten Østergaard, Danish politician
- Morten Gamst Pedersen, Norwegian footballer
- Morten Helveg Petersen, Danish politician
- Morten Rasmussen (disambiguation)
- Morten Rieker, Norwegian sailor
- Morten Ristorp, Danish musician
- Morten Sandanger (born 1997), Norwegian politician
- Morten Schakenda, Norwegian chef
- Morten Skoubo, Danish football player
- Morten Steenstrup, Norwegian barrister and politician
- Morten Tandberg (born 1979), Norwegian football manager
- Morten Therkildsen, Danish cyclist
- Morten Thomsen (born 1957), Danish equestrian
- Morten Thoresen (born 1997), Norwegian Greco-Roman wrestler
- Morten Thorsby, Norwegian footballer
- Morten Tyldum (born 1967), Norwegian film director
- Morten Vågen, Norwegian author
- Morten Veland, Norwegian musician
- Morten Wieghorst, Danish football player
- Morten Wormskjold, Danish botanist and explorer

== People with the surname ==
- Alexander Morten (1836–1900), British footballer
- Eddie Morten (born 1962), Canadian Paralympic athlete, brother of Pier
- Honnor Morten (1861–1913), British nurse, journalist and campaigner
- Mary Morten (born 20th century), American activist
- Pier Morten (born 1959), Canadian judoka and wrestler, brother of Eddie, husband of Shelley
- Shelley Morten (born 1959), Canadian wrestler, wife of Pier
- Thomas Morten (1836–1866), English painter and book illustrator

== See also ==
- Morton (given name)
- Morton (surname)
