= Morton (given name) =

Morton is a masculine given name which may refer to:

- Mort Cooper (1913–1958), American Major League Baseball pitcher
- Morton DaCosta (1914–1989), American theatre and film director, film producer, writer and actor
- Morton Downey (1901–1985), American singer
- Morton Downey Jr. (1932–2001), American singer, songwriter and television talk show host, son of the above
- Morton Feldman (1926–1987), American composer, a major figure in 20th-century classical music
- Morton P. Fisher (1897–1965), United States Tax Court judge
- Mort Garson (1924–2008), Canadian-born composer, arranger, songwriter and pioneer of electronic music
- Morton Gould (1913–1996), American composer, conductor, arranger and pianist
- Morton Ira Greenberg (1933–2021), United States Court of Appeals judge
- Morton Horwitz (born 1938), American legal historian and Harvard law professor
- Morton C. Hunter (1825–1896), American Union Army brevet brigadier general and politician
- Mort Kaer (1902–1992), American football player and pentathlete
- Morton Marcus (1936–2009), American poet and author
- Morton M. McCarver (1807–1875), American politician and pioneer in the West
- Morton McMichael (1807–1879), American newspaper publisher and politician
- Mort Meskin (1916–1995), American comic book artist
- Morton Peck (1871–1959), American botanist
- Mort Sahl (1927–2021), Canadian-born American comedian and social satirist
- Morton O. Schapiro (born 1953), American economist and president of Northwestern University
- Mort Schell (born 1943), Australian former politician
- Morton Sobell (1917–2018), American engineer and spy for the Soviet Union
- Morton Subotnick (born 1933), American composer of electronic music
- Morton Bryan Wharton (1839–1908), American pastor and author

== See also ==
- Morten, a common given name in Denmark and Norway
