= Morton Bryan Wharton =

American pastor and author (1839–1908)

The Reverend Morton Bryan Wharton
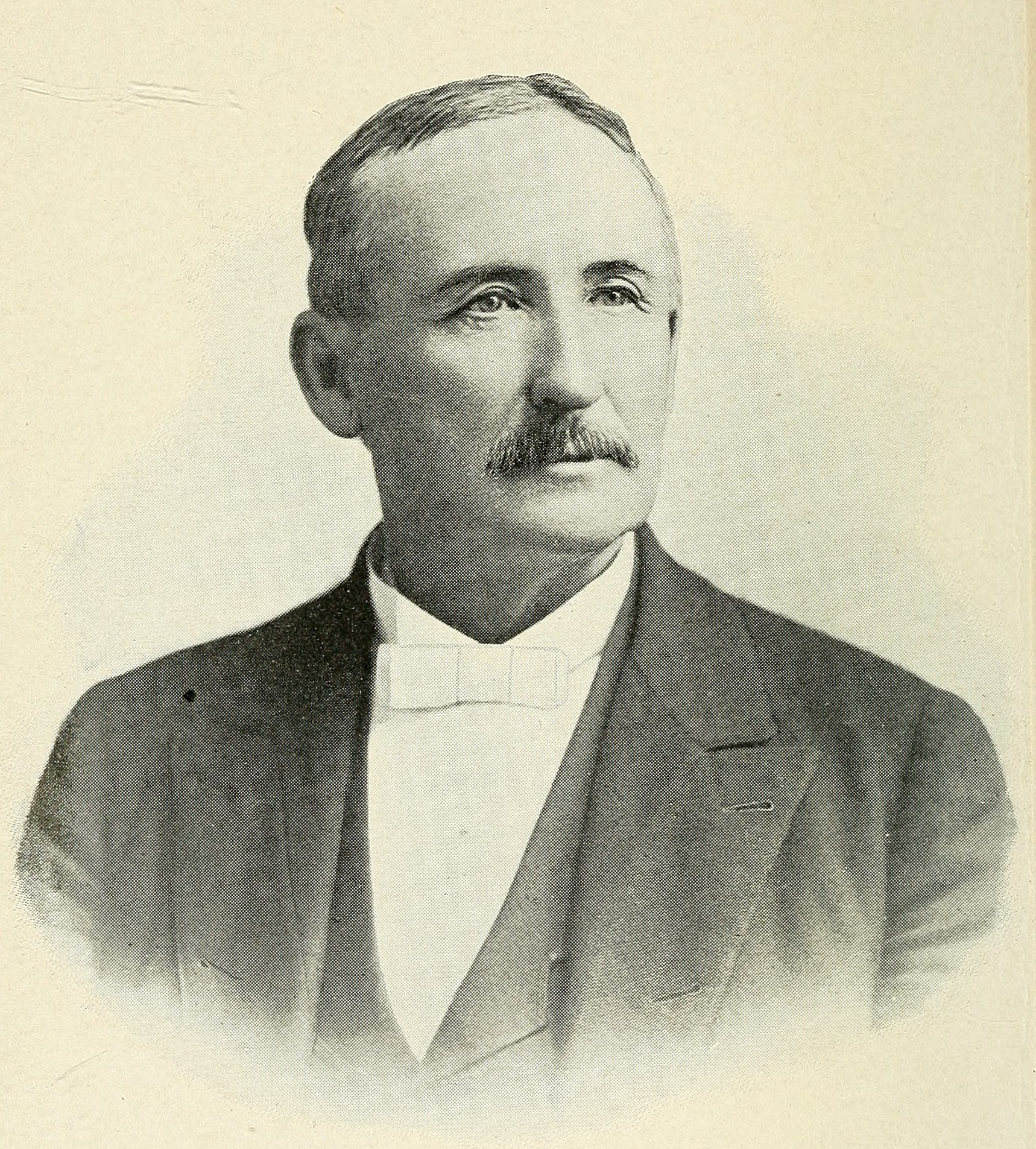
- Wharton in 1898
- Born: April 5, 1839; Orange County, Virginia, United States
- Died: July 20, 1908 (aged 69); Atlanta, Georgia, United States
- Monuments: Reverend Morton Bryan Wharton Statue
- Education: Richmond College; University of Virginia
- Spouse: Mary Belle Irwin (m. 1864)
- Children: 2

Ecclesiastical career
- Religion: Baptist Church
- Ordained: 1862
- Military career
- Allegiance: Confederate States
- Branch: Confederate States Army
- Conflicts: American Civil War

Morton Bryan Wharton (April 5, 1839 – July 20, 1908), also known as M. B. Wharton, was an American Baptist clergyman, author, and consul who served as a pastor and minister of many churches in the Southern States. He is also credited for coining the word pastorium to mean "clergy house" in Baptist spaces.

Born in Virginia, he first spent his early years as a clerk in several businesses in the state. He was then converted to the Baptist Church when he was eighteen years old. He was later educated at Richmond College and the University of Virginia before being interrupted by the American Civil War, where he served under Alfred Madison Barbour. Following the end of the war, he worked as a pastor in multiple churches in Alabama, Kentucky, and Georgia. Because of his health, he later became United States Consul to Sonneberg, where he wrote a memoir on the trip afterwards.

He coined the term pastorium to mean "clergy house" following eschewment from using related terms like rectory. He would send articles containing the word to Funk & Wagnalls, where they would add the term to their Standard Dictionary.

== Early life and education ==
Morton Bryan Wharton was born on April 5, 1839, in Orange County, Virginia, (Note: Some sources say he was born in Culpeper County, Virginia) and was the fifth child of Malcolm Hart Wharton and Susan Roberts Calvin. He was educated in Orange and Culpeper Academy. His father wanted his son to be a businessman, so Malcolm made Morton spend his days working as an assistant depot agent at a store in Brandy Station in Culpeper County. Afterwards, he was promoted as a clerk in the office of the Orange and Alexandria Railroad, of which he held for two years. He then accepted the position of clerk and bookkeeper in a retail store in Alexandria.

In 1857, he converted to the Baptist church in Alexandria at the age of eighteen and was baptized in December 20. During his trip back to Culpeper County to meet back with his family, John Lansing Burrows, while conducting a revival meeting in Cedar Run, persuaded Wharton to study a course of study preparatory to the ministry. Wharton decided to enter Richmond College in October 1858 and graduated in 1861. He then went to the University of Virginia and remained for a few months in the military department. He did not graduate from UVA because the institution was suspended due to the American Civil War.

== Career ==
Wharton first served in the Confederate States Army as a chief clerk under Major Alfred Madison Barbour, the chief quartermaster of General Joseph E. Johnston, at the Fairfax Courthouse. When Johnston's army fell back to the Virginia Peninsula, an office was established in Lynchburg, and Wharton was assigned as a Baptist minister in the office and preached every Sunday to large audiences. He was ordained in Lynchburg in 1862. Because of his preaching, he was called to Bristol, Tennessee, as his first pastorate, which he served for two years.

Afterwards, he worked as an evangelist in the army under Alfred Elijah Dickinson and, later, was urged to visit Georgia as an agent of the Virginia Army and Colportage Board. There, he met and married Mary Belle Irwin in 1864, which made him decide to make Georgia his home.

After the war ended, he accepted an appointment as a general agent for the Domestic and Indian Mission Board of the Southern Baptist Convention. He was then called to become a pastor of the First Baptist Church of Eufaula in Alabama and carried out his responsibility on March 1, 1857, and remained there until five years later. While serving in the church, he increased the membership of the church and helped raise $30,000 in funds to build two meetinghouses.

He left Eufaula and went on to Louisville, Kentucky, to take charge of the Walnut Street Baptist Church in April 1872, where he served for 2 1/2 years. He raised about $50,000 in cash and subscriptions, which he would then use to renovate and refurbish the church. He was forced to resign his post in the church due to dyspepsia and retired to his plantation in Southwestern Georgia in 1875.

Wharton would then be called to the Greene Street Church in Augusta, Georgia, after he recuperated, where he would remain for one year. His declining health forced him to resign again in 1876. That same year, Washington and Lee University had given him the Doctor of Divinity degree. He also received a Doctor of Laws from the University of Alabama.

Because agency work that required travel benefited his health, he assisted in raising the financial endowment for the Southern Baptist Theological Seminary by working as an agent in Georgia. He secured about $35,000 in endowment funds in bonds and cash. Because of this, he was elected by the Trustees of the Seminary as a Corresponding Secretary of the Seminary during the Southern Baptist Convention to help raise the annual $20,000 to support the institution.

During this time, he was also awarded many honors, including being elected trustee of the Western Theological Institute, Manager of the Baptist Orphans' Home in Kentucky, and trustee of Mercer University.

=== Consul ===
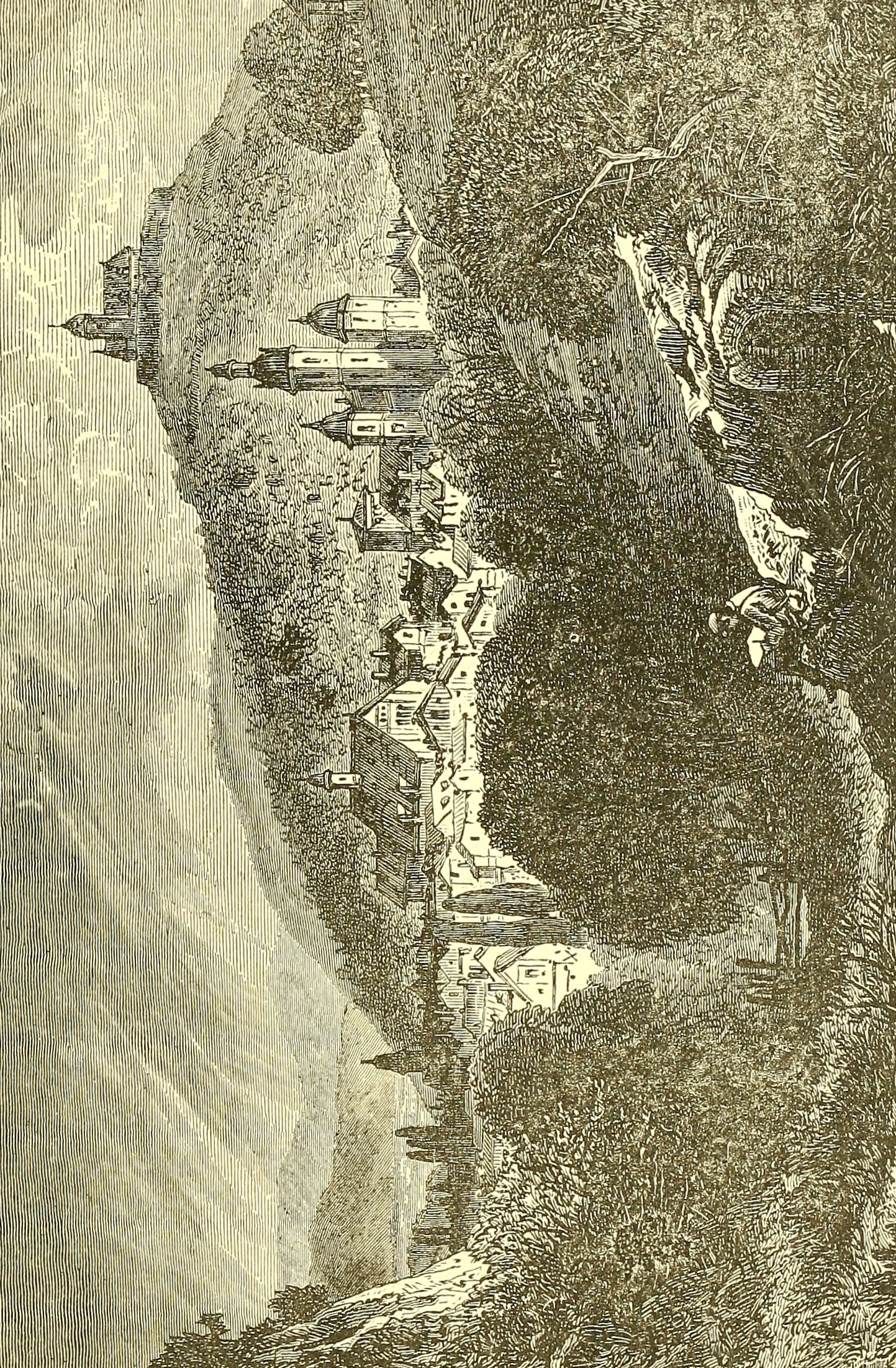
Sketch of Veste Coburg in Wharton's European Notes

Wharton would then be appointed as a United States Consul at Sonneberg under President James A. Garfield because he wanted to regain his health and to view the wonders of Europe. He reached Sonneberg on August 6, 1881, and described his work as consul consisting of "chiefly in the certification of invoices, notarial acts, issuing passports, extending protection to American citizens, looking after property of American citizens who die abroad, and writing monthly reports to the Secretary of State at Washington, on agricultural and commercial and other interests, designed for publication by the State Department."

Although Wharton's office was at Sonneberg, he took up residence in Coburg, where he would describe it as the "most beautiful place [he has] ever seen." During his time as consul, he also served as a pastor on Sundays in his own residence and instructed the children in Sunday school. He would also travel from other European places, like Italy and Scotland, to see the sites of the Old World. He would return to the United States to work as a pastor again in Augusta. When he returned to America, he would fill the role of editor of The Christian Index of the Georgia Baptist Mission Board.

Wharton's first book, titled European Notes: Or, What I Saw in the Old World, was written in 1884 and chronicled his journey within Europe. According to Wharton, he wrote this book following requests from parts of the United States and may prove useful to those who went to Europe, those who want to go to Europe, and those who can't go to Europe.

When Wharton returned to the United States in Augusta, Georgia, he succeeded James Dixon in his brief pastorate of less than a year. During these ten months as pastor, he renovated and enlarged the meeting house, and two new churches were constituted. Two years later, he would continue working as a pastor in the First Baptist Church in Montgomery, Alabama, and then the Freemason Street Baptist Church in Norfolk, Virginia, of which he served for eight years. In 1899, he resigned on the spot and accepted a position as co-pastor of the Brantly Baptist Church in Baltimore. Because of his declining health, he accepted a call from the First Baptist Church of Eufaula.

Wharton died on July 20, 1908, in Atlanta, Georgia. Before his death, he assured his brother, Henry M. Wharton, that his life's work was finished and ready to go. The First Baptist Church of Eufaula erected a monument dedicated to Wharton after his death. The monument is located at the intersection of Barbour Street and Randolph Avenue.

== Pastorium ==
Excerpt of an article in The Montgomery Advertiser of Wharton stating that he's not leaving his position in the Freemason Street Baptist Church, 1892. The word pastorium is highlighted in yellow.

Wharton is credited as the one who coined the term pastorium to mean "Baptist clergy house" in the Southern States sometime in the 1890s. His Alabama parishioners finished building a new home for their pastor to replace the old First Baptist Church of Eufaula, where no minister had lived for many years.

Wharton was given the problem of devising a new name for the residence; he was eschewed from using the words parsonage, rectory, or manse due to connections from other Christian denominations. Following this, he formed the word pastorium by combining the word pastor and from an analogy of other words ending with -ium, like auditorium. The word was then adopted into Wharton's congregation assembled in prayer meetings.

News reports of the invention of the word quickly spread and brought forth editorial approval in several leading Baptist journals, which endorsed the word. According to Wharton, he would send news articles containing the word pastorium to Funk & Wagnalls, who eventually used the word in the 2nd volume of their Standard Dictionary:

pas-to'ri-um, pa̮s-tō'ri-um, n. [Southern U.S.] A parsonage: coined recently after the analogy of auditorium

— Funk & Wagnalls, A Standard Dictionary of the English Language, Vol. 2, p. 1290

A book by Wharton, titled Pictures from a Pastorium, published in 1898 while he was working as a pastor at the Freemason Street Baptist Church, used this word frequently in his poems. An example of this is within the first poem of the book titled The Pastorium:

The place where congregations meet,
We style an auditorium,
The place where pastors make their seat
Should, then, be called "Pastorium."

— Morton Bryan Wharton, Pictures from a Pastorium, p. 12

== Publications ==
- 1884: European Notes: Or, What I Saw in the Old World, James P. Harrison & Co.
- 1889: Famous Women of the Old Testament, W. P. Blessing
- 1890: Famous Women of the New Testament, W. P. Blessing
- 1898: Pictures from a Pastorium, J. B. Lippincott Company
- 1903: Famous Men of the Old Testament, E. B. Treat & Co.
- 1904: Sacred Songs of Popular Airs, Franklin Printing and Publishing Co.
