= Morten Rasmussen =

Morten Rasmussen may refer to:

- Morten Rasmussen (footballer, born January 1985), "Duncan", Danish striker who currently plays for Midtjylland (formerly of Celtic)
- Morten Rasmussen (footballer, born March 1985), "Molle", Danish defender who currently plays for AC Horsens

== See also ==
- Morten Rasmussen House, historical house in Utah
