= Clergy house =

Residence of one or more priests or ministers of religion

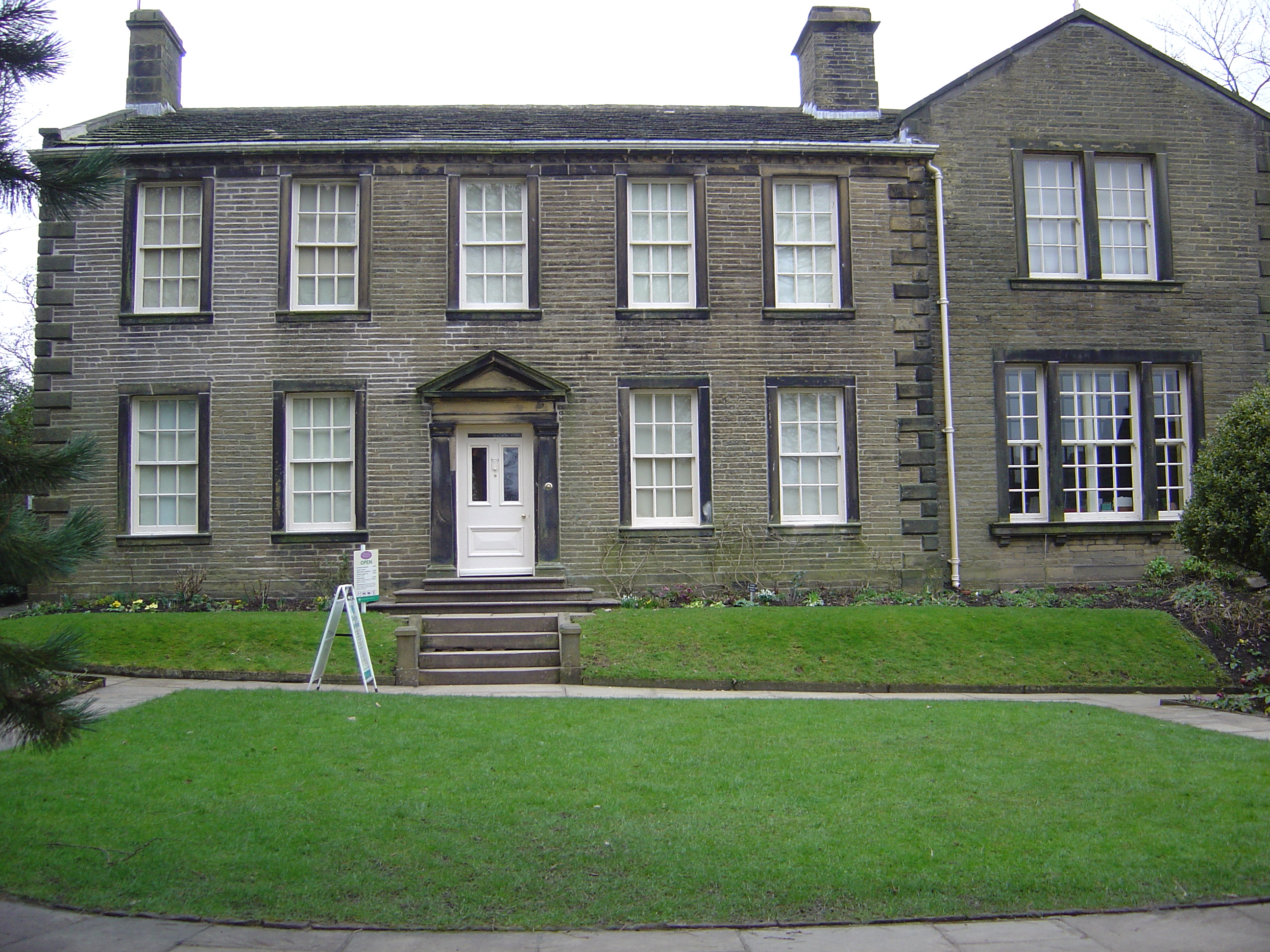
The former parsonage in Haworth, England, which once served as the Brontë family home and is now the Brontë Parsonage Museum

A clergy house is the residence, or former residence, of one or more priests or ministers of a given religion, serving as both a home and a base for the occupant's ministry. Residences of this type can have a variety of names, such as manse, parsonage, presbytery, rectory, or vicarage.

== Function ==
A clergy house is typically owned and maintained by a church, as a benefit to its clergy. This practice exists in many denominations for several reasons:

- In some denominations, clergy are transferred from one church to another at relatively frequent intervals.
- In smaller rural communities, suitable housing is not always available or may be not able to be sold quickly if the pastor leaves (often for a larger congregation in a city or suburban area).
- In addition, such a residence can be supplied in lieu of, or as a supplement to, salary, especially at smaller congregations.

Under tax laws in some countries, the person residing in the clergy house must be licensed, commissioned, or ordained by the church or denomination, in order to claim the value of the house as a tax-free benefit.

Catholic clergy houses in particular may be lived in by several priests from a parish. Clergy houses frequently serve as the administrative office of the local parish, as well as a residence. They are normally located next to, or at least close to, the church their occupant serves.

Partly because of the general conservation of churches, many clergy houses have survived and are of historic interest or importance. In the United Kingdom, the 14th-century Alfriston Clergy House was the first property to be acquired by the National Trust. It was purchased in a state of near ruin in 1896 for £10, the vicarage having moved elsewhere long before.

In some countries where the clergy houses were often rather grand, many of them have now been sold off by the churches and replaced by more modest properties. Numerous clergy houses have been acquired by families for use as private homes. Others have been adapted as offices or used for various civic functions. In many villages in England, the former clergy house is called the "Old Vicarage" or the "Old Rectory". In Scotland, a former clergy house may be known as the "Old Manse".

== Nomenclature ==
There are a number of more specific terms whose use depends on the rank of the occupant, the denomination, and the locality. Above the parish level, a bishop's house was traditionally called a "bishop's palace", a dean's residence is known as a deanery, and a canon lives in a canonry or "canon's house". Other clerical titles have different names for their houses.

A parsonage is where the parson of a church resides; a parson is the priest/presbyter of a parish church. A rectory is the residence of an ecclesiastical rector, although the name may also be applied to the home of an academic rector (e.g., a Scottish university rector), or other person with that title. In North American Anglicanism, a far greater proportion of parish clergy were (and still are) titled as rector than in Britain, so the term rectory is more common there.

The names used for homes of ordinary parish clergy vary considerably and include the following:

- The Anglican Communion uses the terms vicarage or (more informal and old-fashioned) parsonage, and rectory if appropriate.
- Roman Catholics use the terms priory, clergy house, parochial house (mostly in Ireland), chapel house (in Scotland), presbytery, and rectory (especially in Massachusetts) if appropriate. In the Philippines, the term convent is used, a direct calque of the Spanish convento. An ecclesiastical residence, sometimes called a presbytery, is the residence of a cleric in their diocese or parish.
- Manse (cognate with mansion) is a Scottish term that is used in Scottish Presbyterianism, and also in other parts of the British Isles by Non-conformist churches such as the Methodists and the United Reformed Church. This name is also commonly used by Baptists in the United Kingdom and in some Commonwealth countries.
- Pastorium is a term in the Southern United States, especially among Baptists. The term was coined by Baptist pastor Morton Bryan Wharton.
- Parsonage is used by Lutheran churches, along with some Baptist and other denominations, and non-denominational churches.
- The name "parish house" is used by many denominations.

== Gallery ==
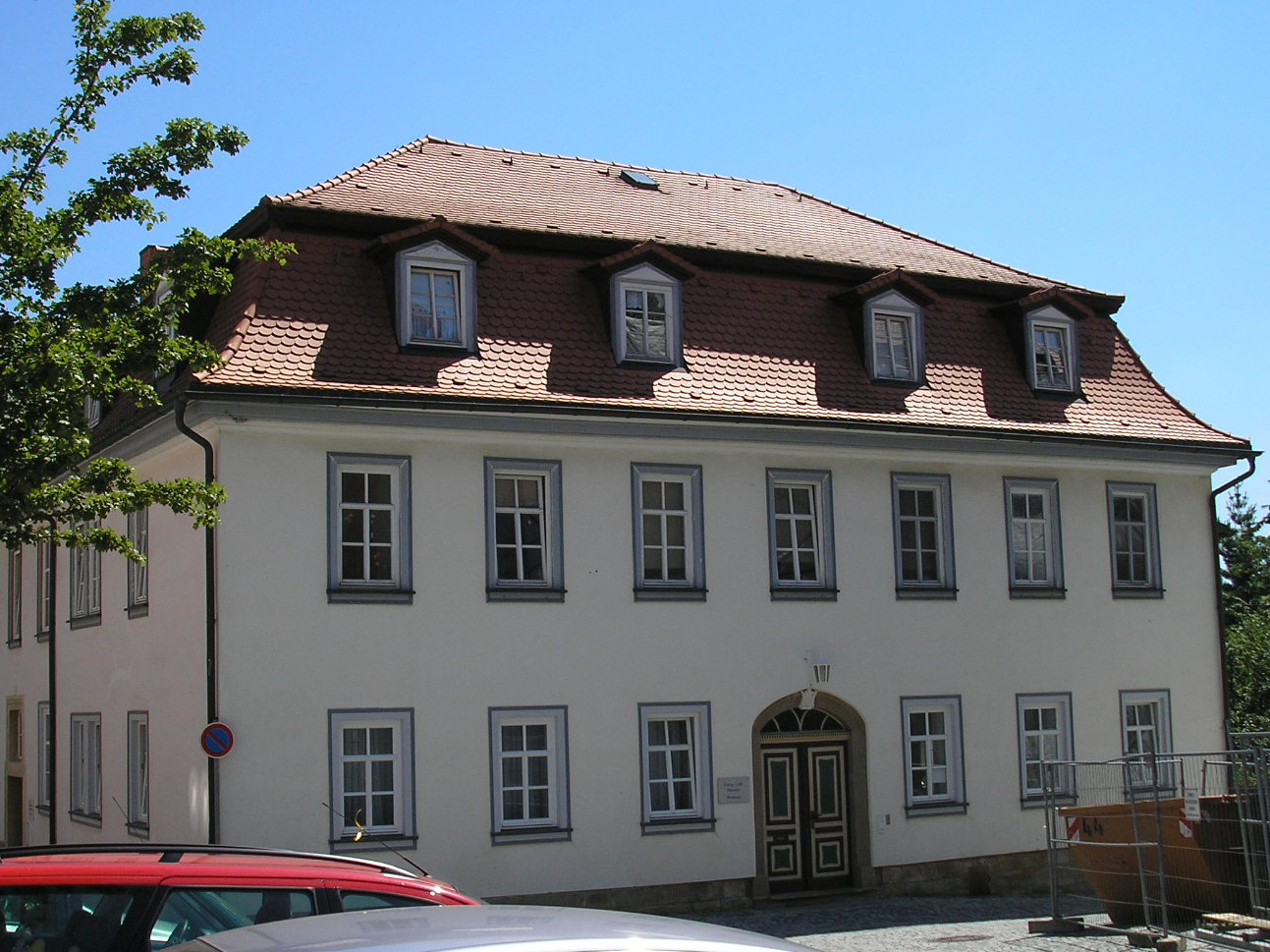
A rectory in Ilmenau, Germany

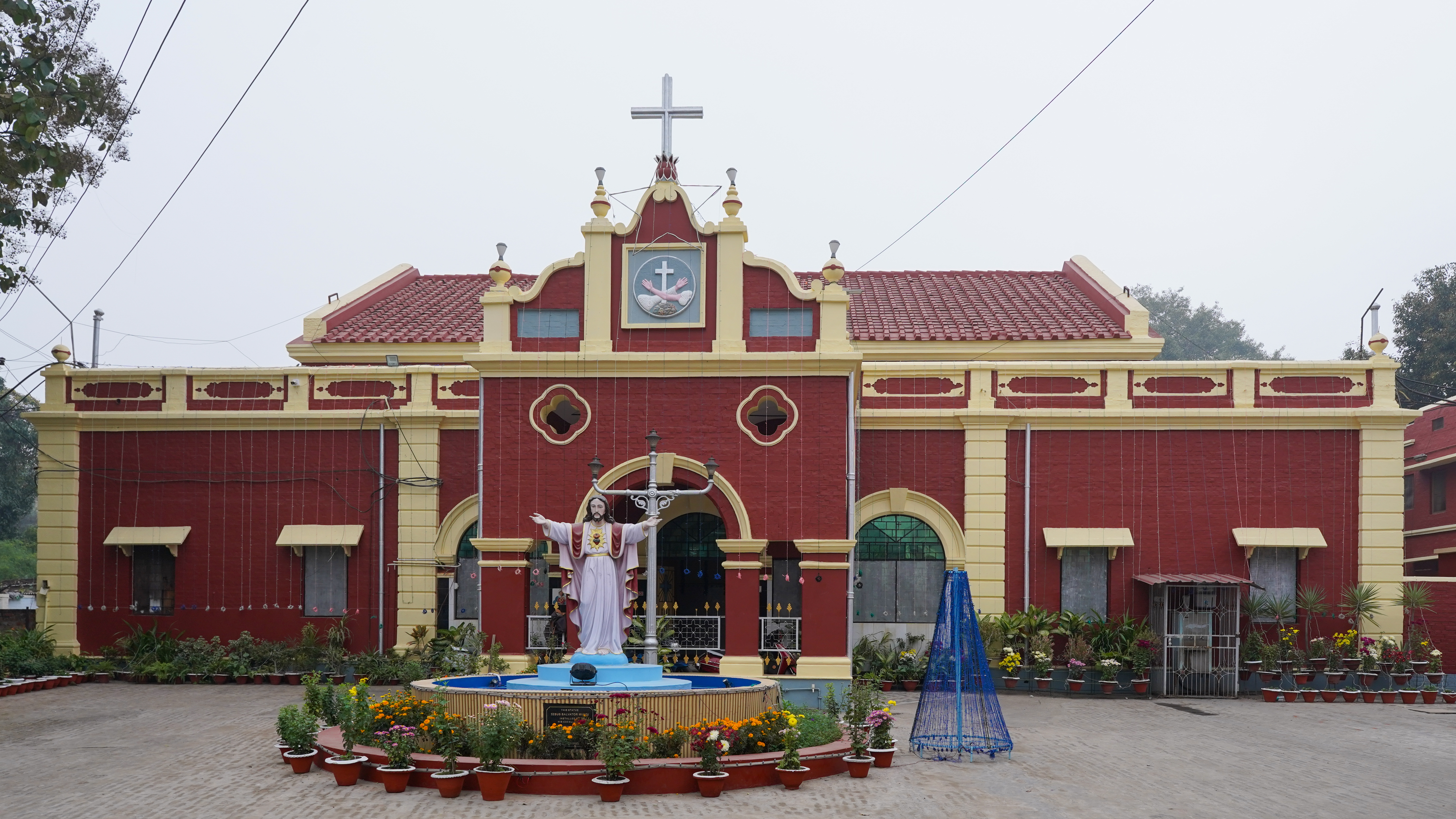
Parish house, St. Joseph's Cathedral, Prayagraj, India

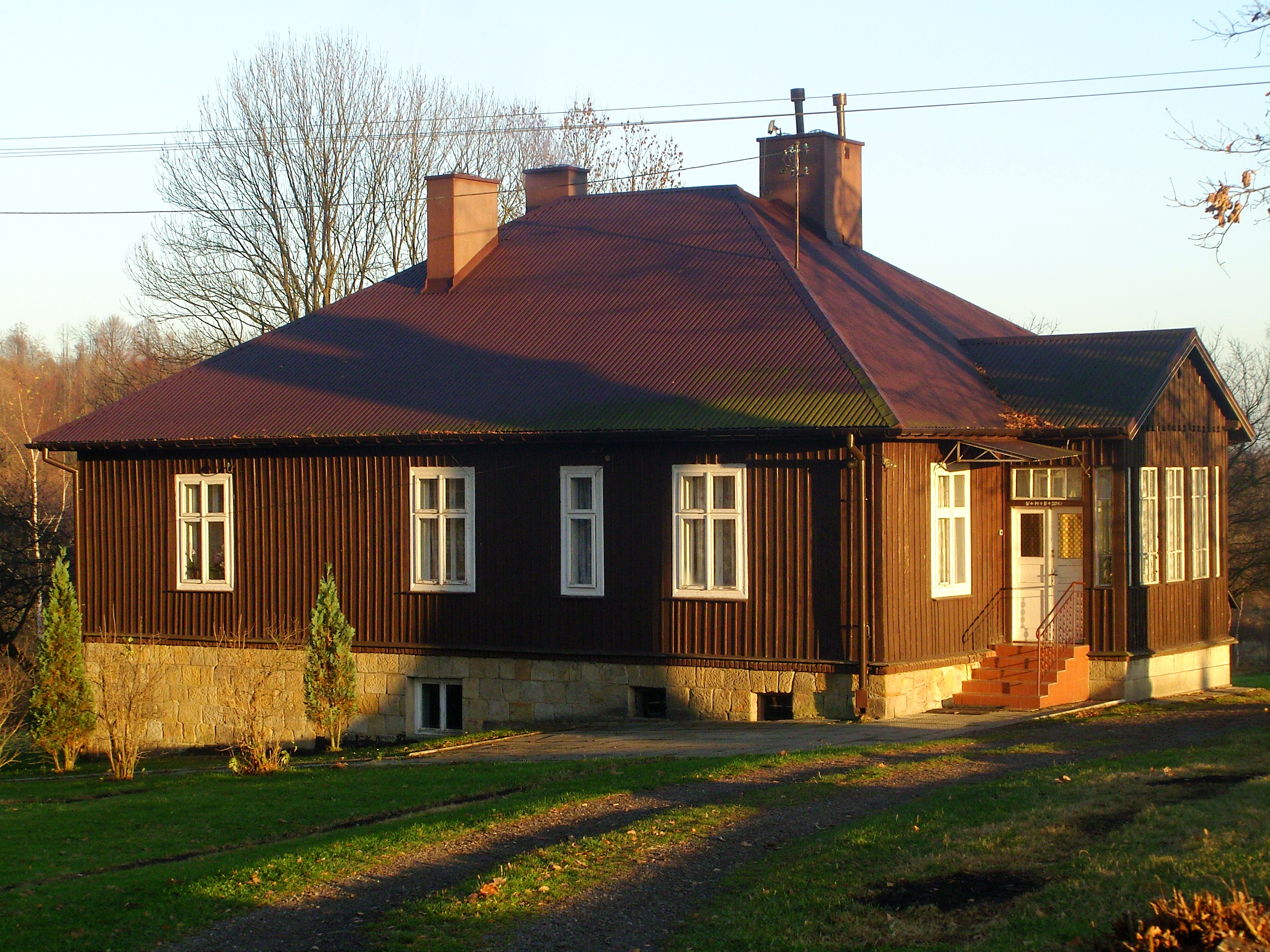
The rectory in Bączal Dolny, Poland (1923)

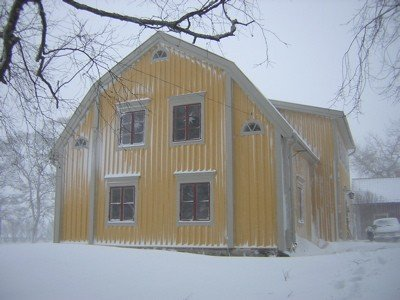
The rectory in Valö, Uppland, Sweden

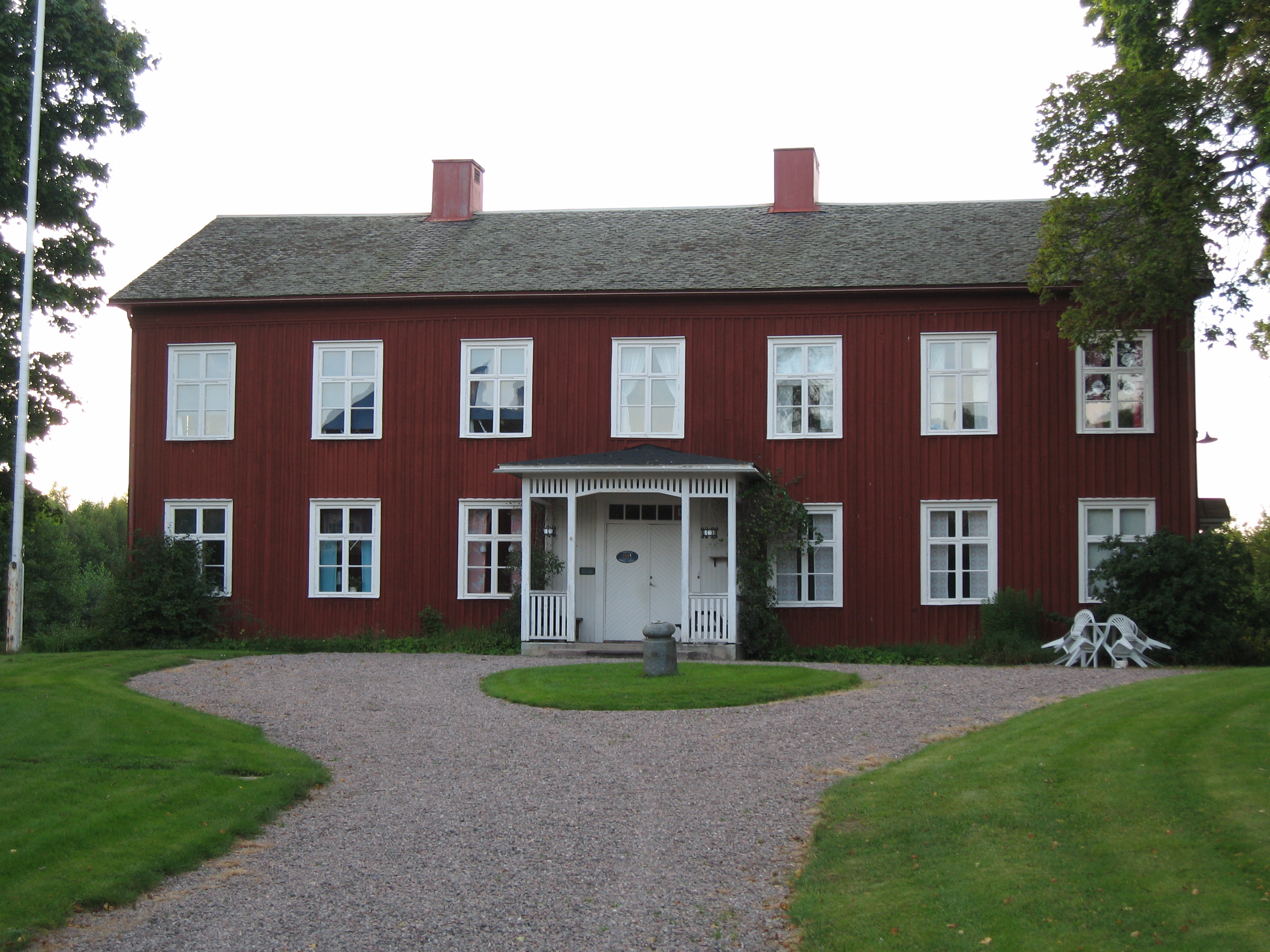
The rectory in Edsleskog, Dalsland, Sweden

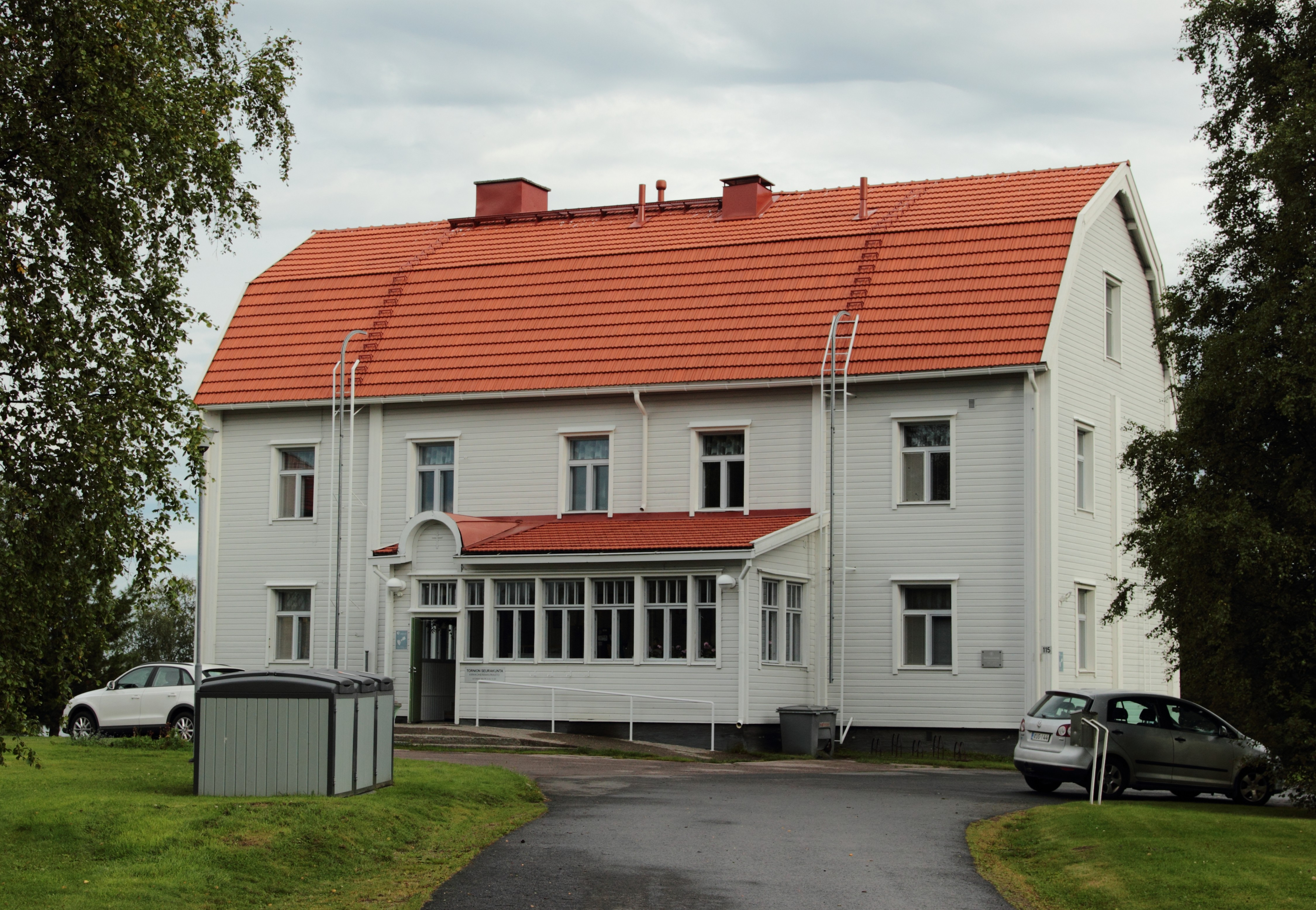
The rectory in Alatornio, Lapland, Finland

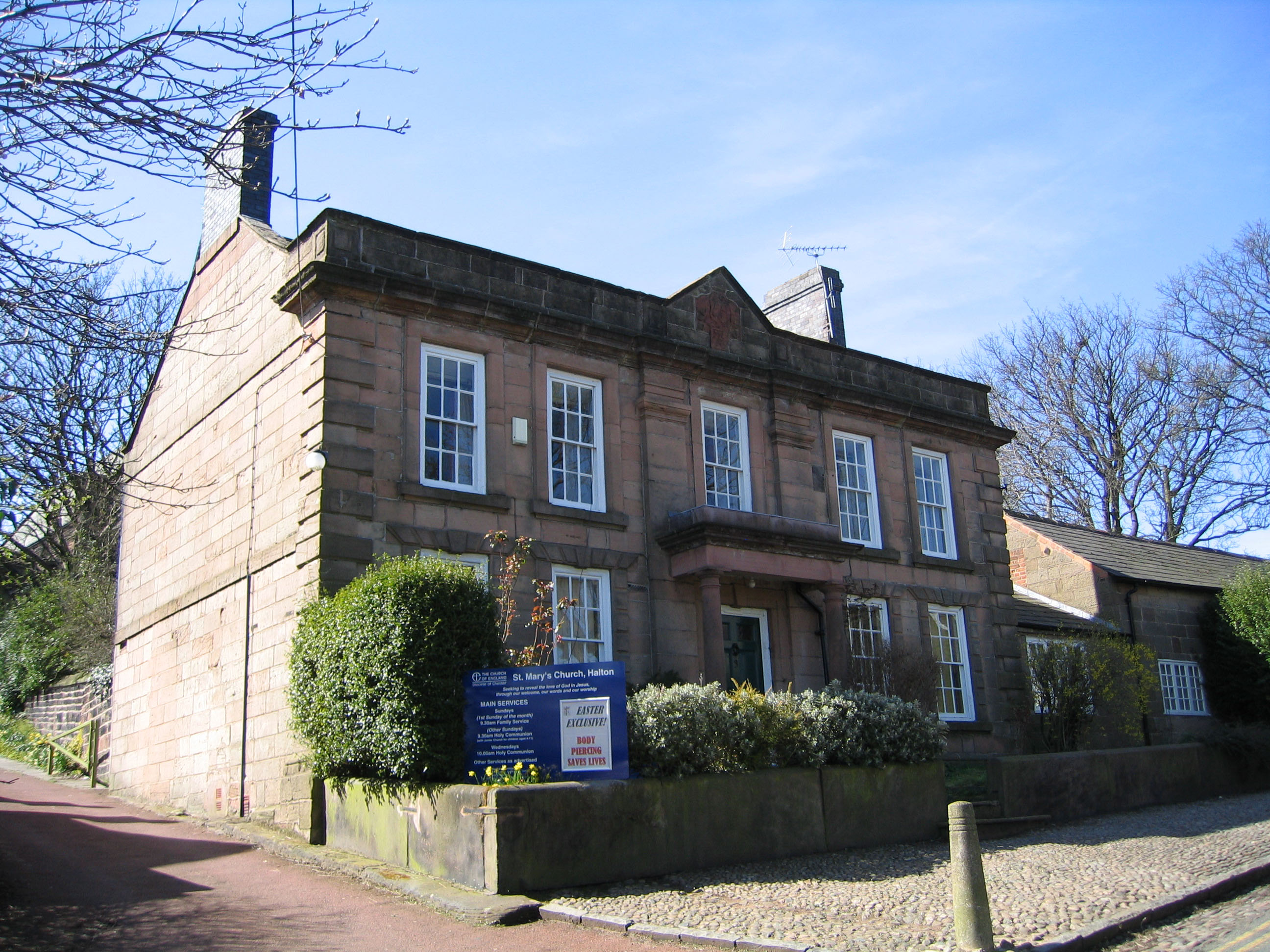
Halton Vicarage, England; 1739 and still used

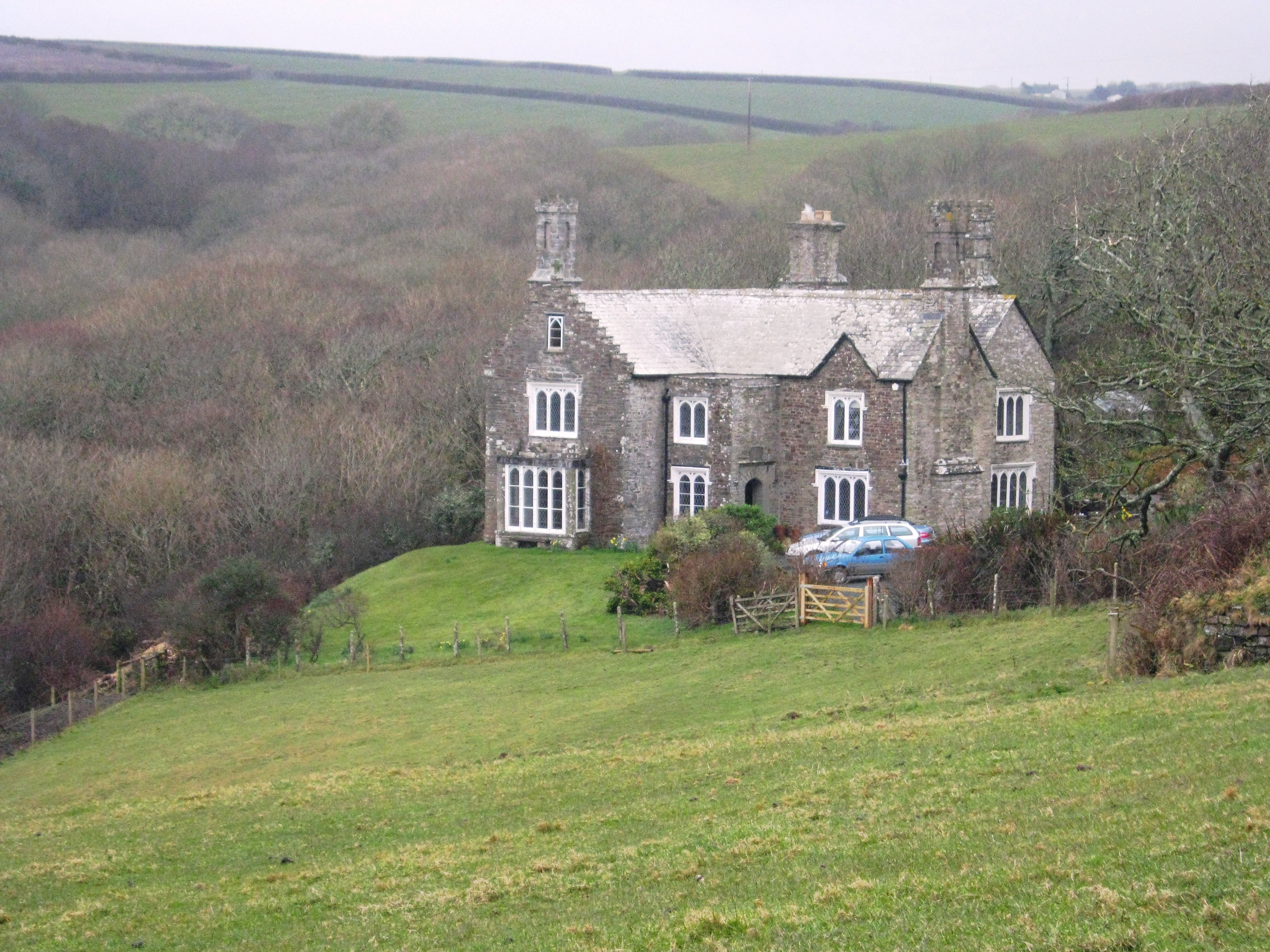
The old vicarage, Morwenstow, England

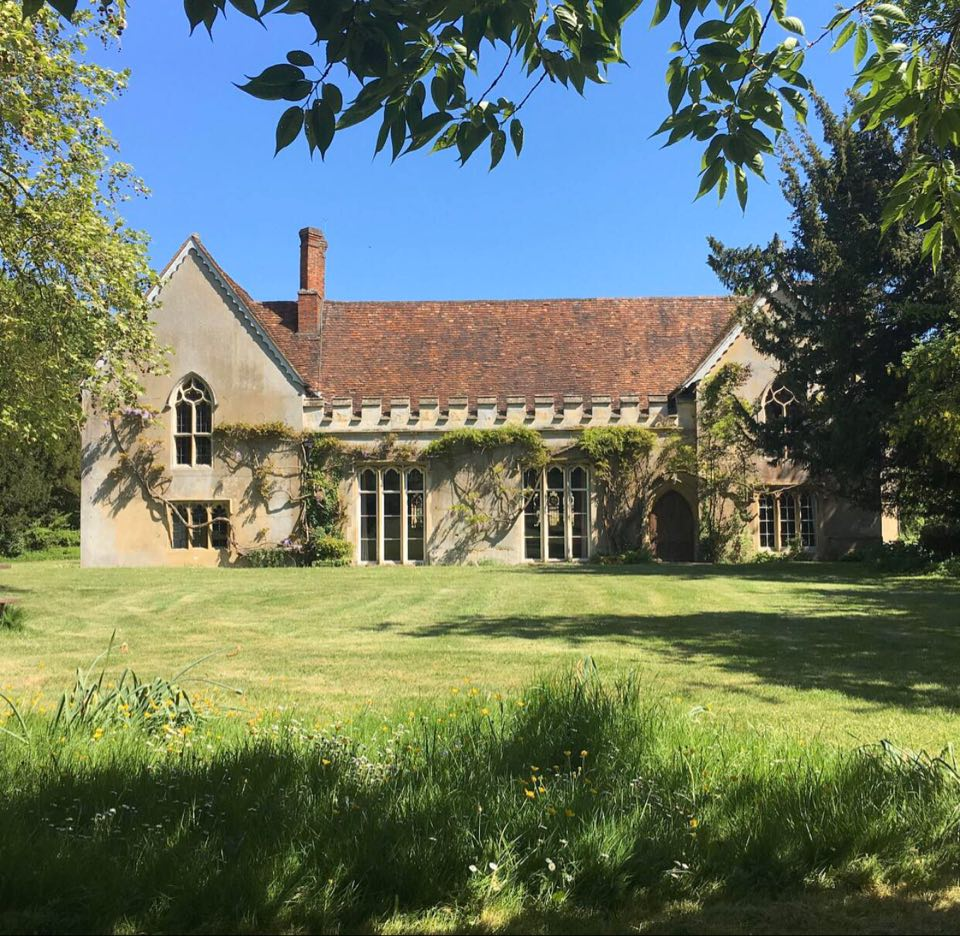
The Abbey, Sutton Courtenay, former rectory of Abingdon Abbey, England

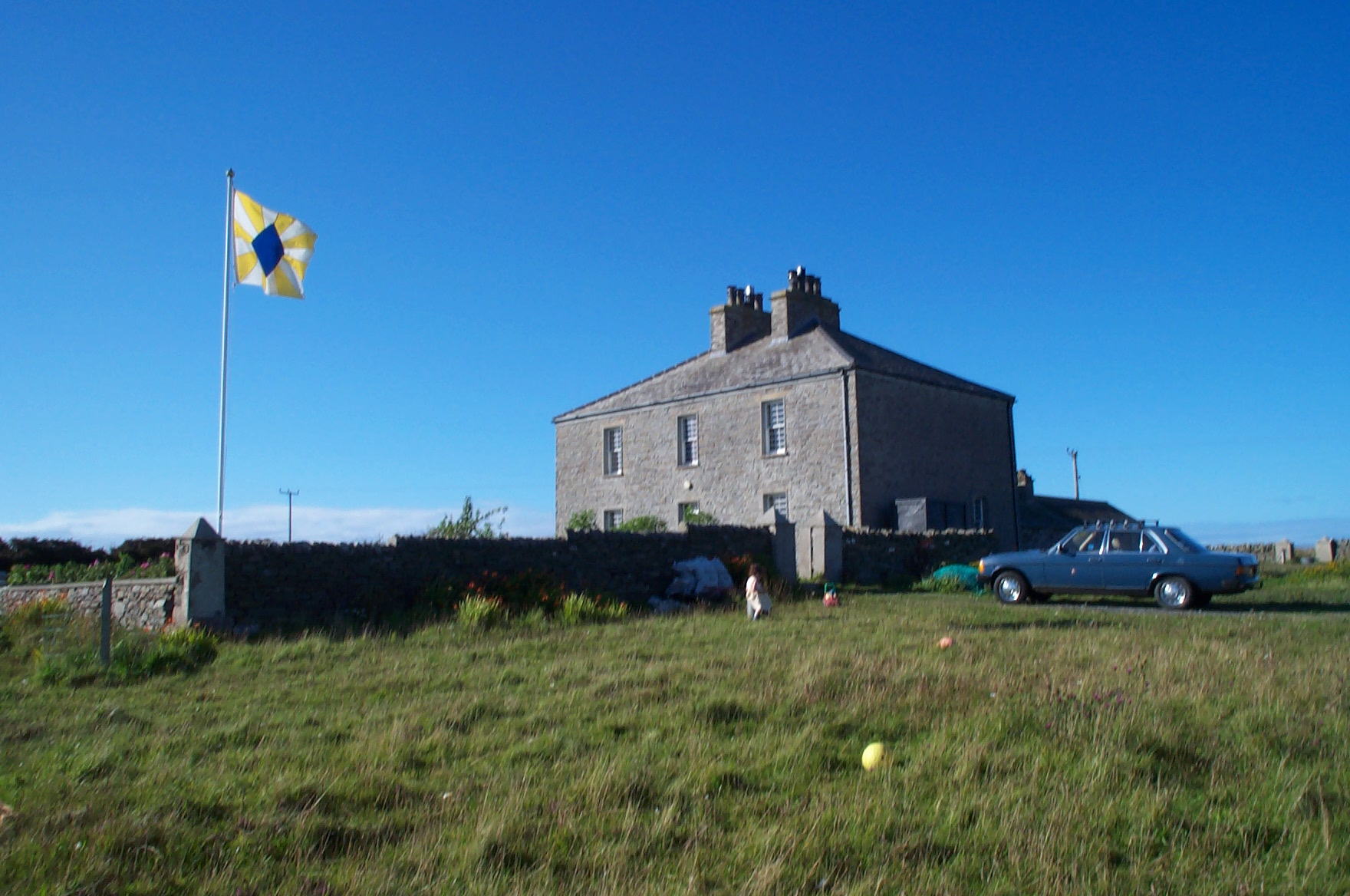
The West Manse, Sanday, Scotland (formerly the Free Kirk manse)

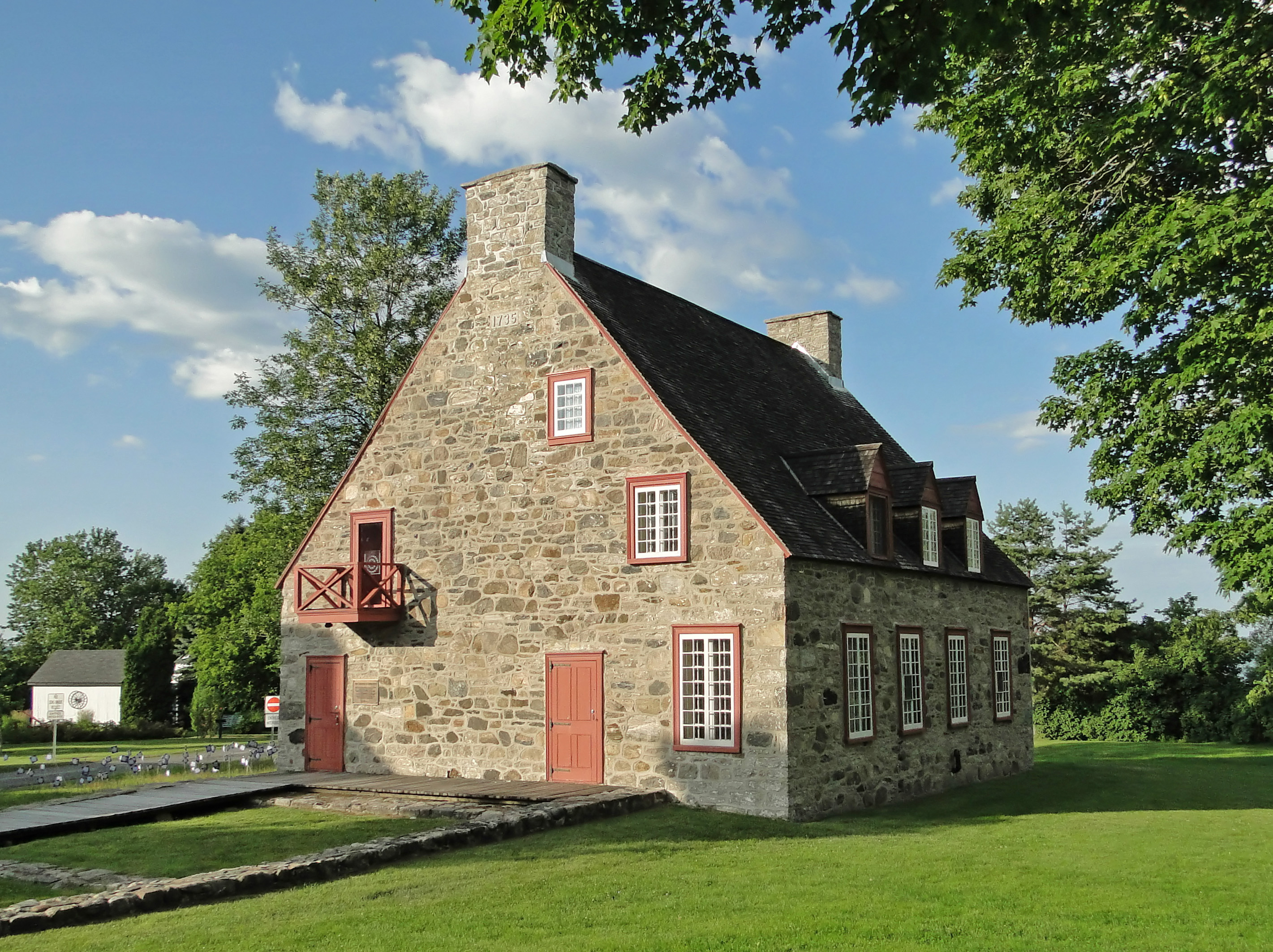
Old rectory of Deschambault (1815–1818), Canada

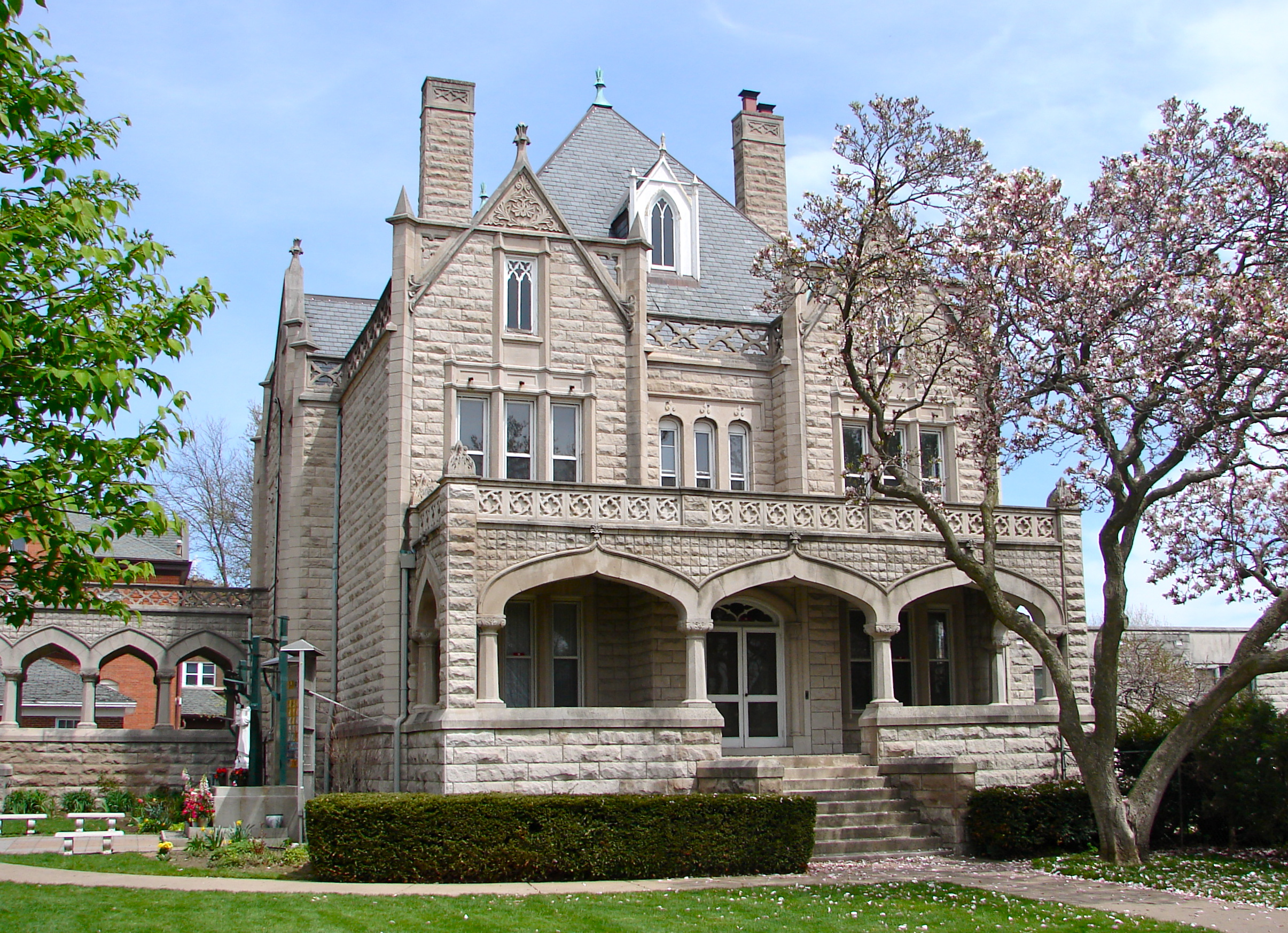
Sacred Heart Cathedral Rectory in Davenport, Iowa, USA

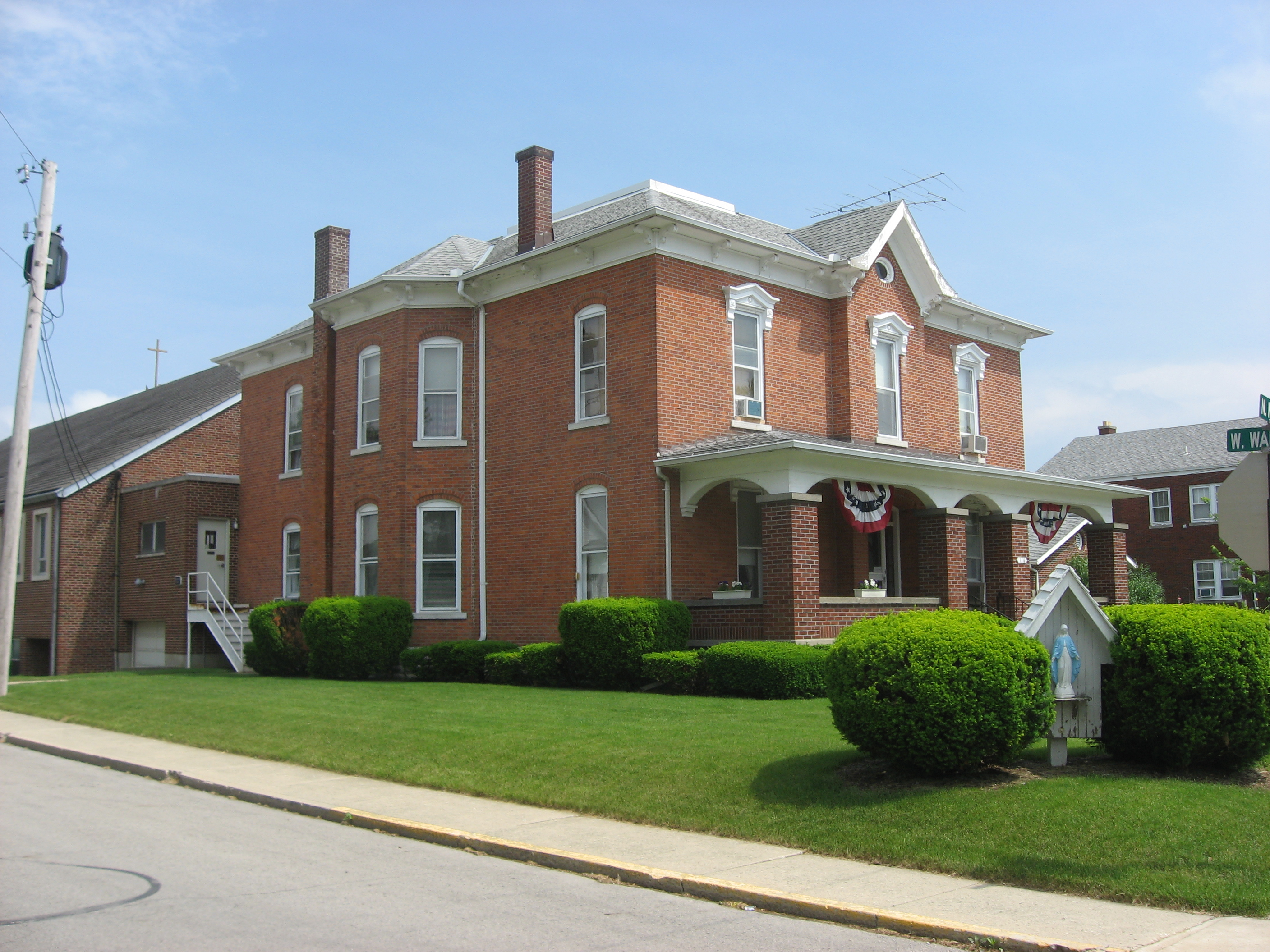
An 1887 Catholic rectory in Ohio, USA

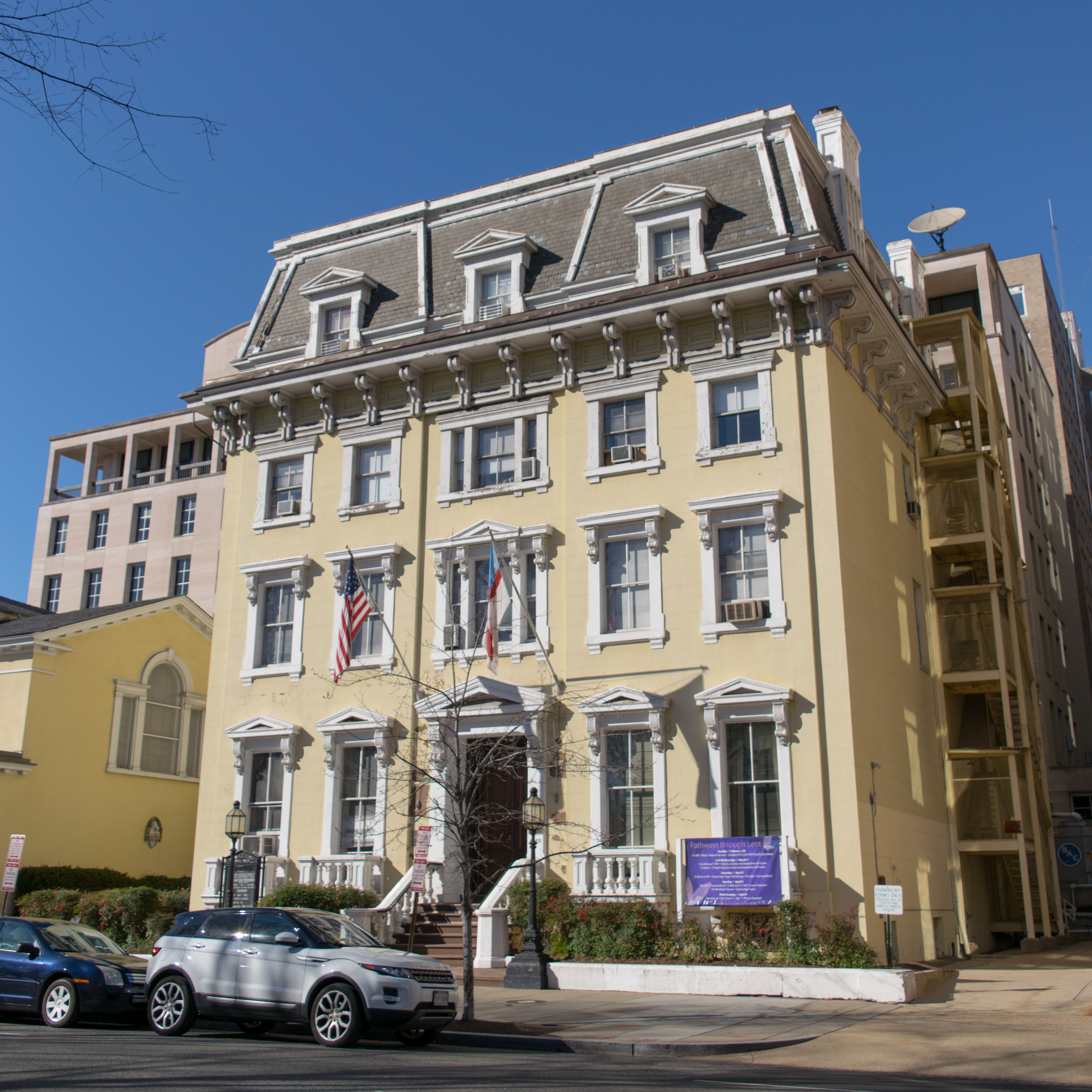
Ashburton House, the parish house of St. John's Episcopal Church, Lafayette Square, Washington D.C. USA

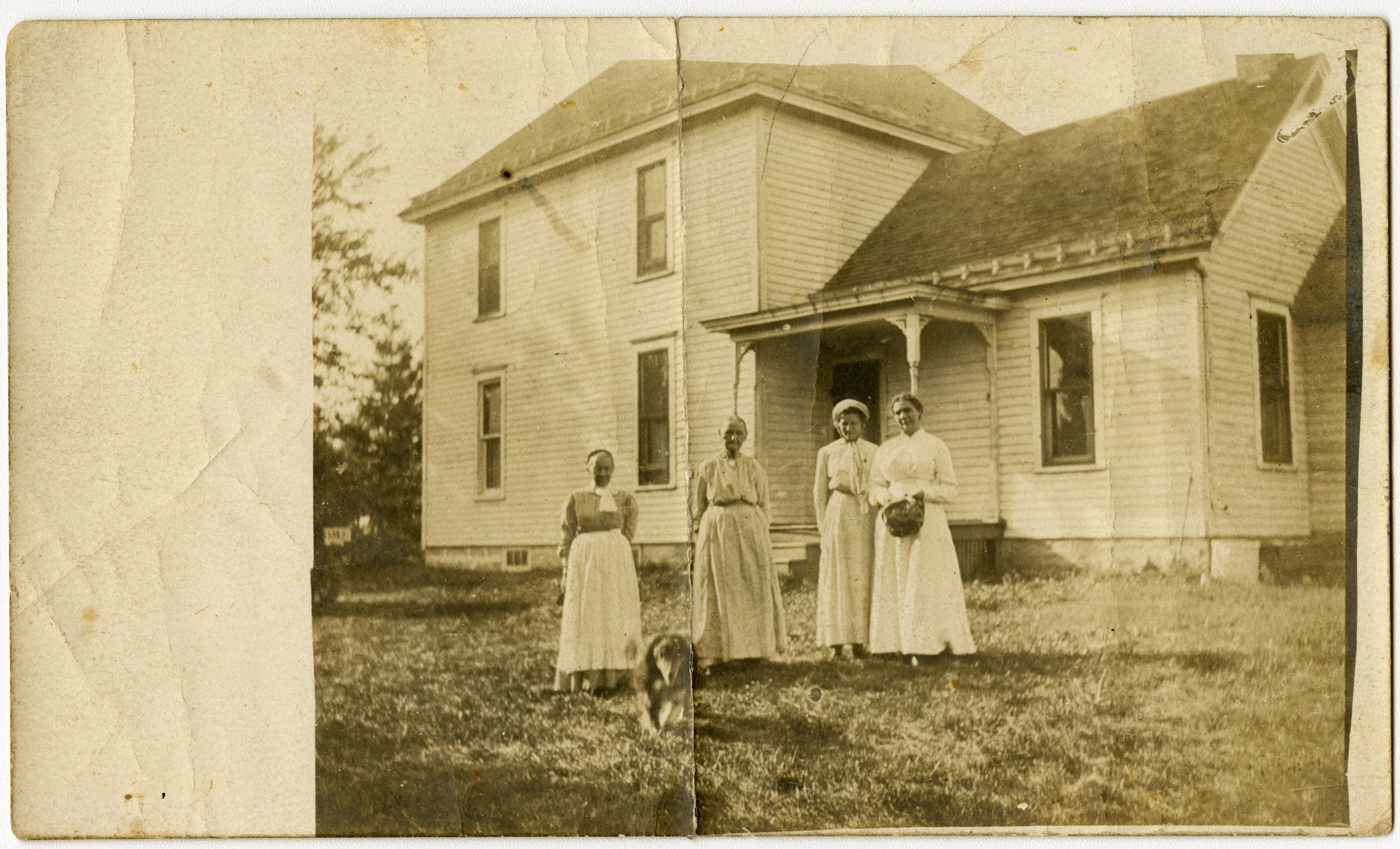
Four women outside the Rognlie parsonage, Franklin, Minnesota, USA

== See also ==
- Clergy housing allowance
