= Morten Nielsen =

Morten Nielsen may refer to:

- Morten Nielsen (footballer, born 1990), Danish footballer
- Morten Nielsen (footballer, born 1982), Danish footballer
- Morten Nielsen (footballer, born 1971), former Danish footballer
- Morten Nielsen (rower) (born 1980), Danish Olympic rower
- Morten Nielsen (sailor) (born 1960), Danish Olympic sailor
