= Morten Christiansen =

Morten Christiansen may refer to:

- Morten Christiansen (cyclist) (born 1974), Norwegian professional cyclist
- Morten Christiansen (footballer) (born 1978), Danish professional football player
- Morten H. Christiansen (born 1963), Danish neuroscientist of language

== See also ==
- Morten Christensen
