= Thomas Morten =

English illustrator and painter (1836–1866)

Thomas Morten (1836–1866) was an English painter and book illustrator.

== Life ==
Thomas Morten was born on 27 March 1836 at Uxbridge, Middlesex. He came to London and studied at the painting school kept by J. Mathews Leigh in Newman Street. Morten was chiefly employed as an illustrator of books and serials, mostly of a humorous nature. The most successful were his illustrations to an edition of Swift's Gulliver's Travels, published in 1864, which ran into several editions. Morten also practised as a painter of domestic subjects, and was an occasional exhibitor at the Royal Academy, sending in 1866 Pleading for the Prisoner. His affairs, however, became embarrassed, and he committed suicide on 23 September 1866.

== Gallery ==
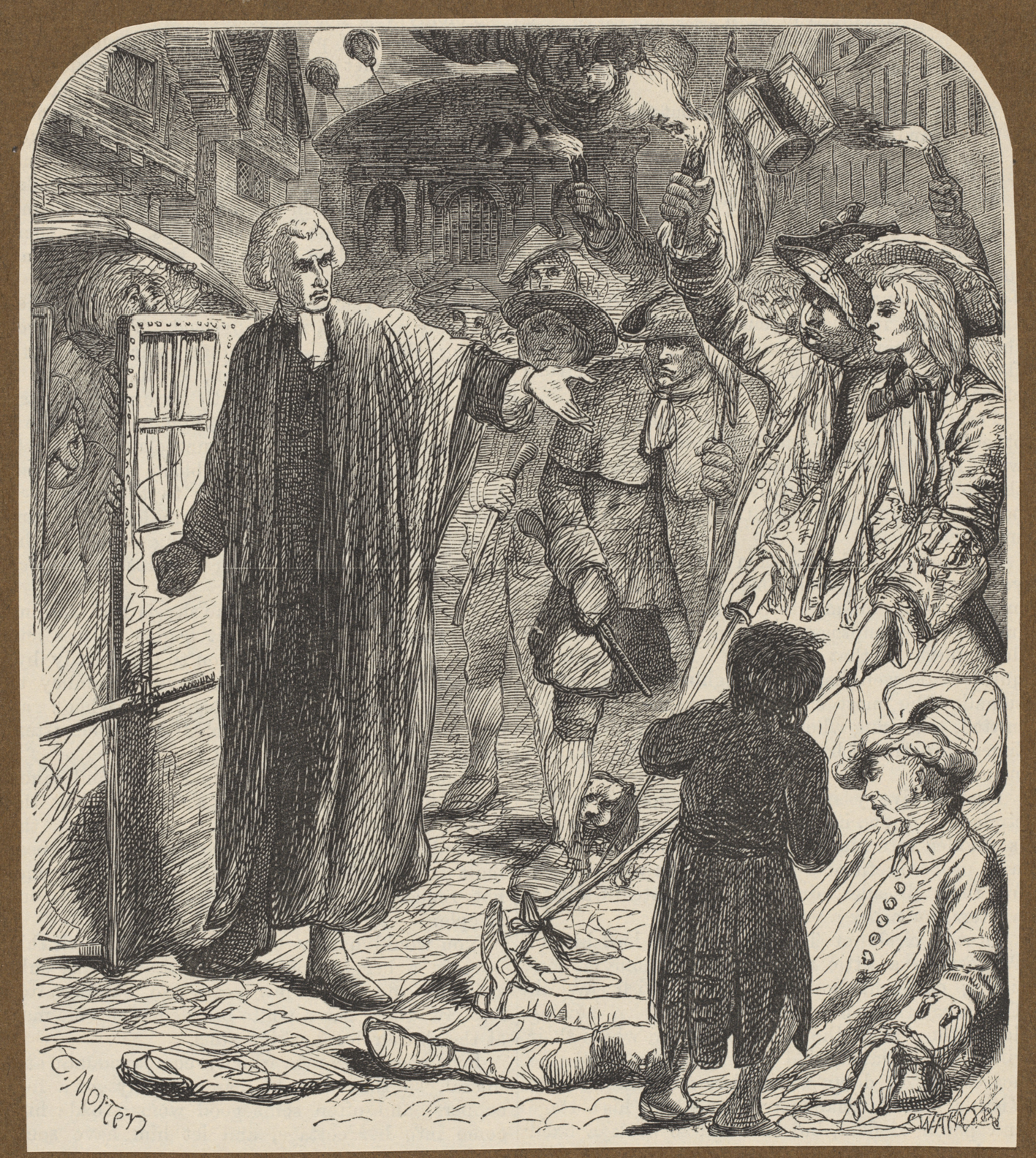
Swift and the Mohawks (1861)

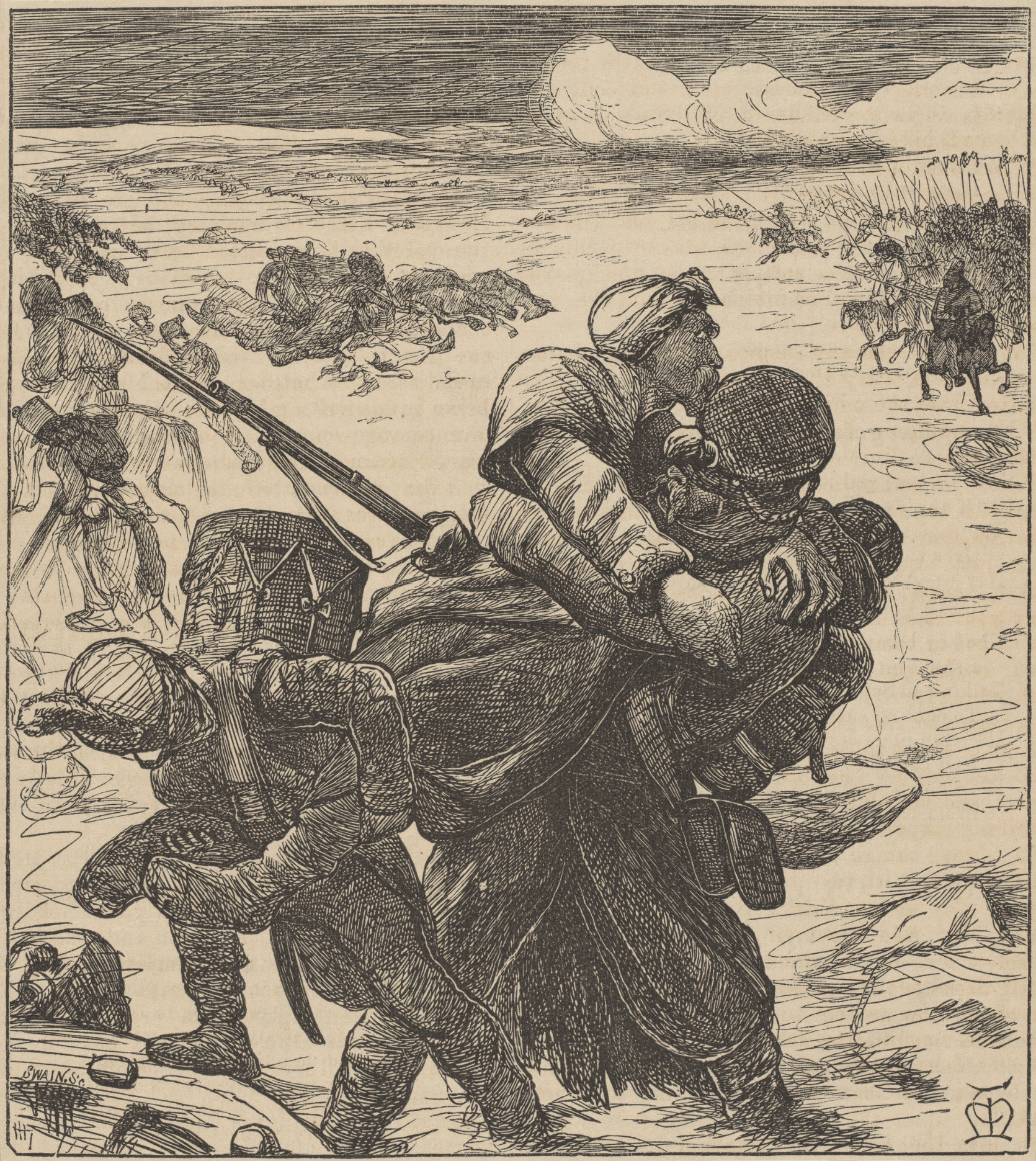
The Father of the Regiment (1861)

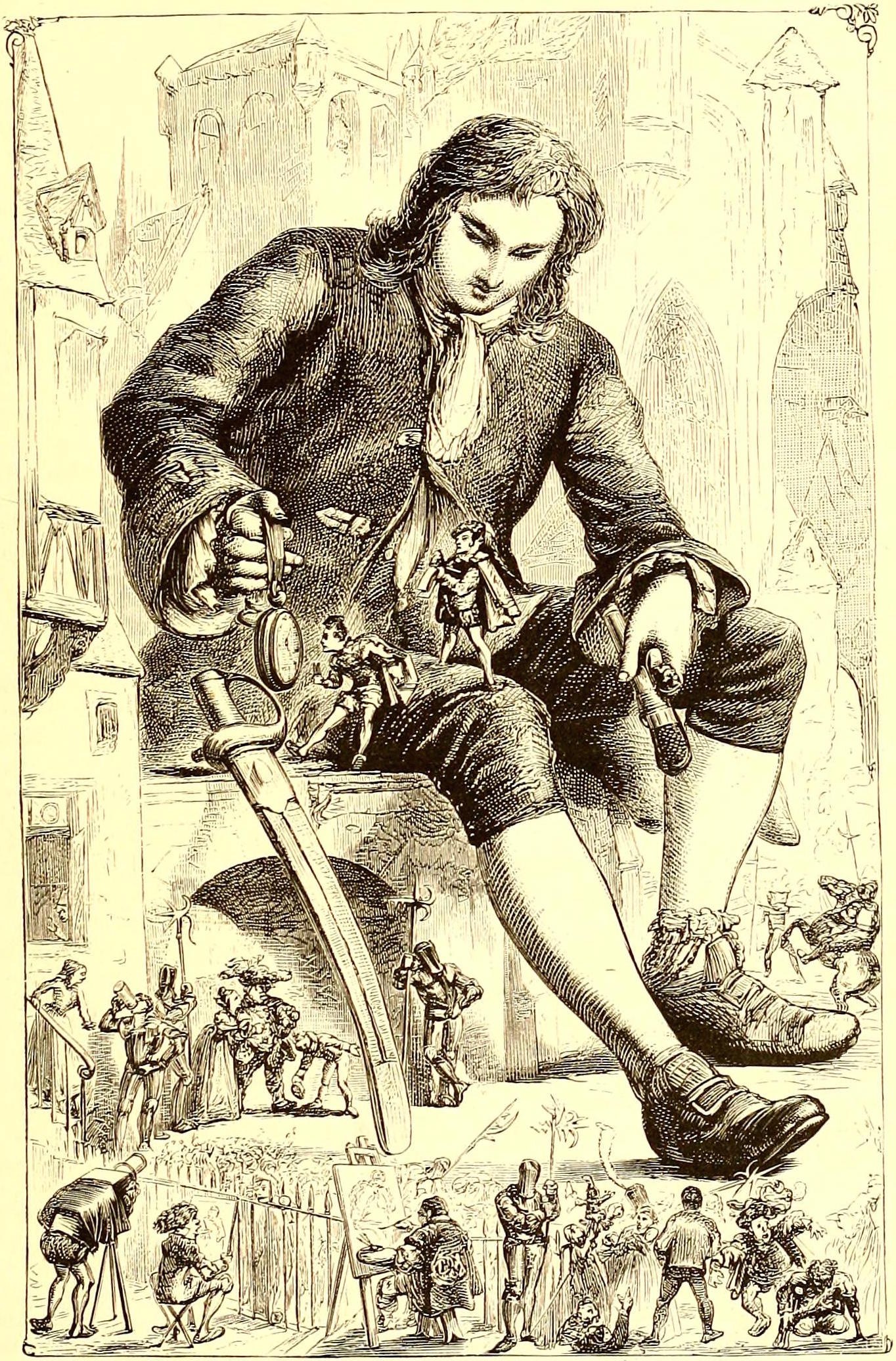
Lilliputians Examining the Man‐Mountain's Possessions (1874)

== Sources ==
- This article incorporates text from a publication now in the public domain: Cust, Lionel Henry (1894). "Morten, Thomas". In Lee, Sidney (ed.). Dictionary of National Biography. Vol. 39. London: Smith, Elder & Co. pp. 117–118.
- Cooke, Simon (21 March 2013). "Thomas Morten (1836-66)". Victorian Web. Retrieved 21 September 2022.
- Goldman, Paul (2004). "Morten, Thomas (1836–1866), illustrator and painter". Oxford Dictionary of National Biography (online ed.). Oxford University Press. doi:10.1093/ref:odnb/19340. (Subscription, Wikipedia Library access or UK public library membership required.)
- Graves, Algernon (1884). A Dictionary of Artists Who Have Exhibited Works in the Principal London Exhibitions of Oil Paintings From 1760 to 1880. London: George Bell and Sons. p. 165.
- Redgrave, Samuel (1874). "Morten, Thomas". A Dictionary of Artists of the English School. London: Longmans, Green, and Co. p. 284.
- "Morten, Thomas". Benezit Dictionary of Artists. Oxford Art Online. 2011. Retrieved 21 September 2022.
