= Freemason Street Baptist Church =

Historic church in Virginia, US

- U.S. National Register of Historic Places
- Virginia Landmarks Register
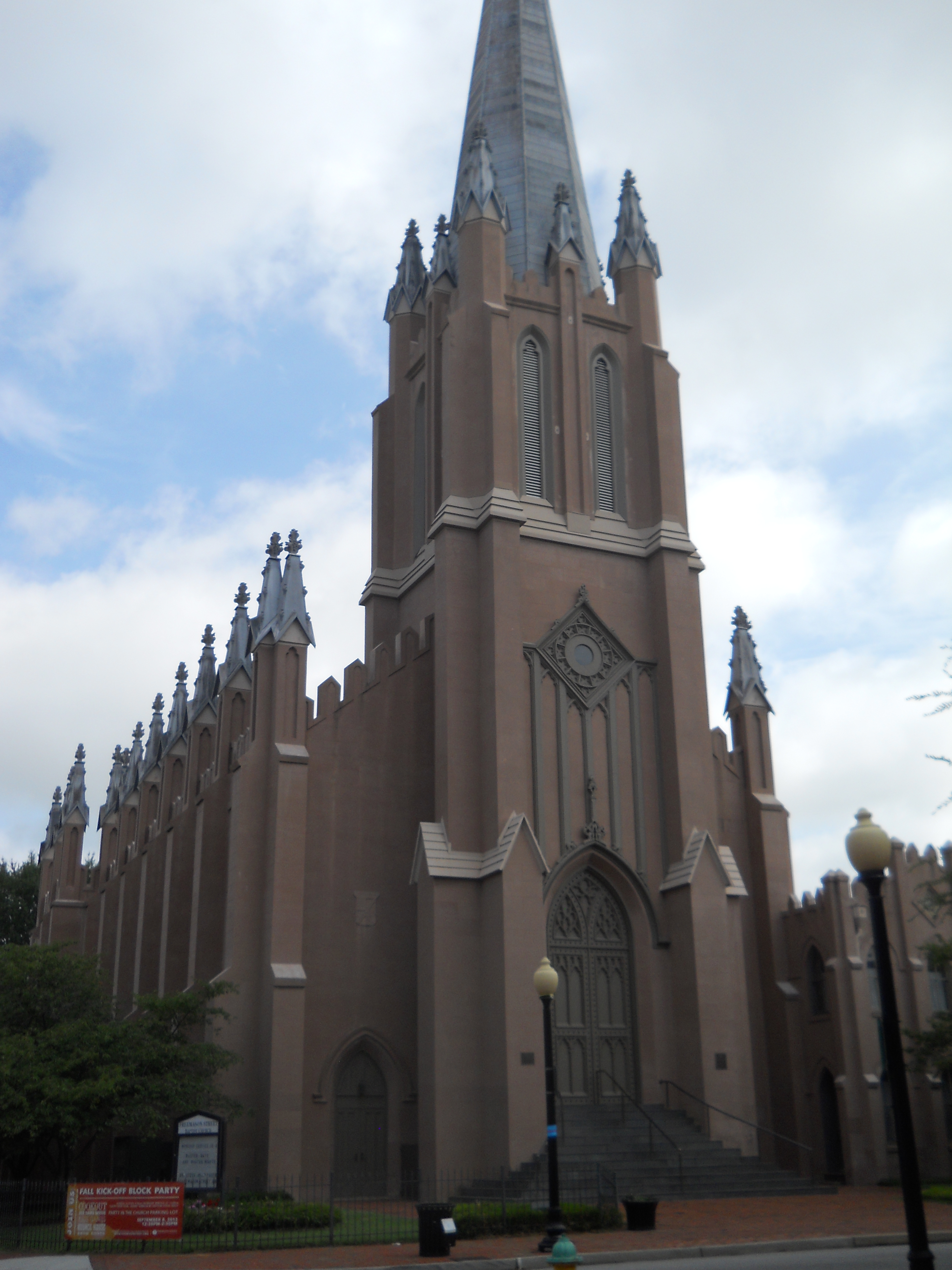
- Freemason Street Baptist Church, September 2013

- Location within Virginia Location within the United States
- Location: NE corner of Freemason and Bank Sts., Norfolk, Virginia
- Coordinates: 36°51′1″N 76°17′14″W
- Area: 2 acres (0.81 ha)
- Built: 1850
- Architect: Walter, Thomas U.
- Architectural style: Perpendicular Gothic
- NRHP reference No.: 71001057
- VLR No.: 122-0008

Significant dates
- Added to NRHP: September 22, 1971
- Designated VLR: April 6, 1971

Freemason Street Baptist Church is a historic Baptist church located at Norfolk, Virginia. It was designed by architect Thomas Ustick Walter and dedicated in 1850. It is a one-story, Perpendicular Gothic-style stuccoed brick church. The front facade features a projecting belfry and two stage tower topped by an octagonal spire.

It was listed on the National Register of Historic Places in 1971.
