= Morten Christensen =

Morten Christensen may refer to:

- Morten Christensen (tennis) (born 1965), former Danish tennis player
- Morten Stig Christensen (1958–2024), former Danish handball player
- Morten Ring Christensen (born 1990), Norwegian freestyle competitor in skicross

== See also ==
- Morten Christiansen
