= Morten Rasmussen House =

- U.S. National Register of Historic Places
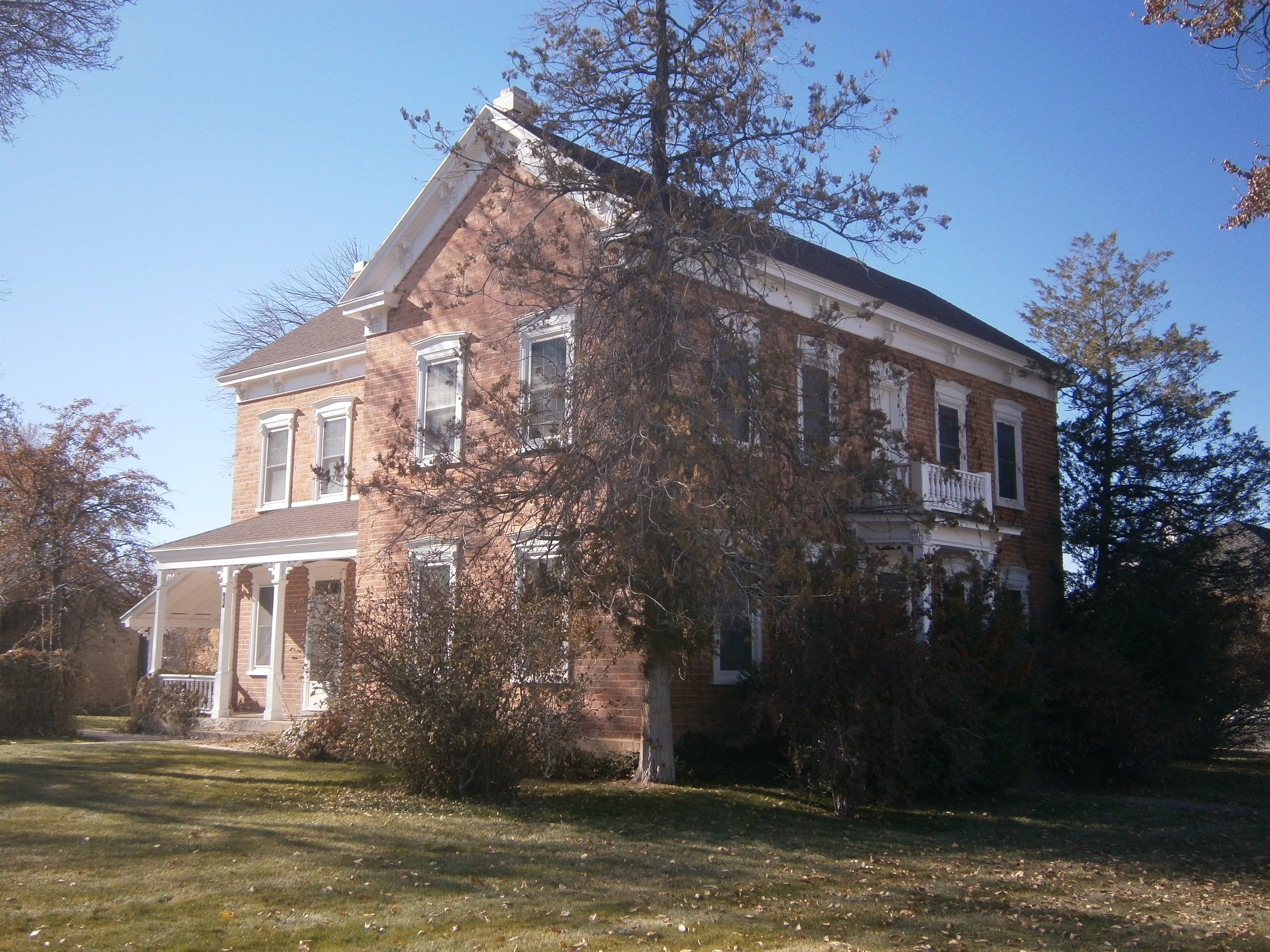

- Location within Utah Location within the United States
- Location: 12 S. 400 West, Mount Pleasant, Utah
- Coordinates: 39°32′47″N 111°27′46″W
- Area: less than one acre
- Built: 1875
- Built by: Morten Rasmussen
- Architectural style: Federal
- NRHP reference No.: 77001317
- Added to NRHP: August 18, 1977

The Morten Rasmussen House is a historic two-story house in Mount Pleasant, Utah. It was built with red bricks in 1875 by Morten Rasmussen, an immigrant from Denmark who converted to the Church of Jesus Christ of Latter-day Saints and arrived in Ephraim, Utah in 1851, before moving to Mount Pleasant with other Mormon settlers in 1859. Rasmussen lived in this house, designed in the Federal architectural style, with his wife, née Karen Marie Christiansen, also an immigrant from Denmark, and their twelve children. He was a missionary in his native Denmark from 1881 to 1883, and he died in 1885. The house has been listed on the National Register of Historic Places since August 18, 1977.
