= First Baptist Church of Eufaula =

Church building in Alabama, United States

Coordinates: 31°53′30.58″N 85°8′35.75″W

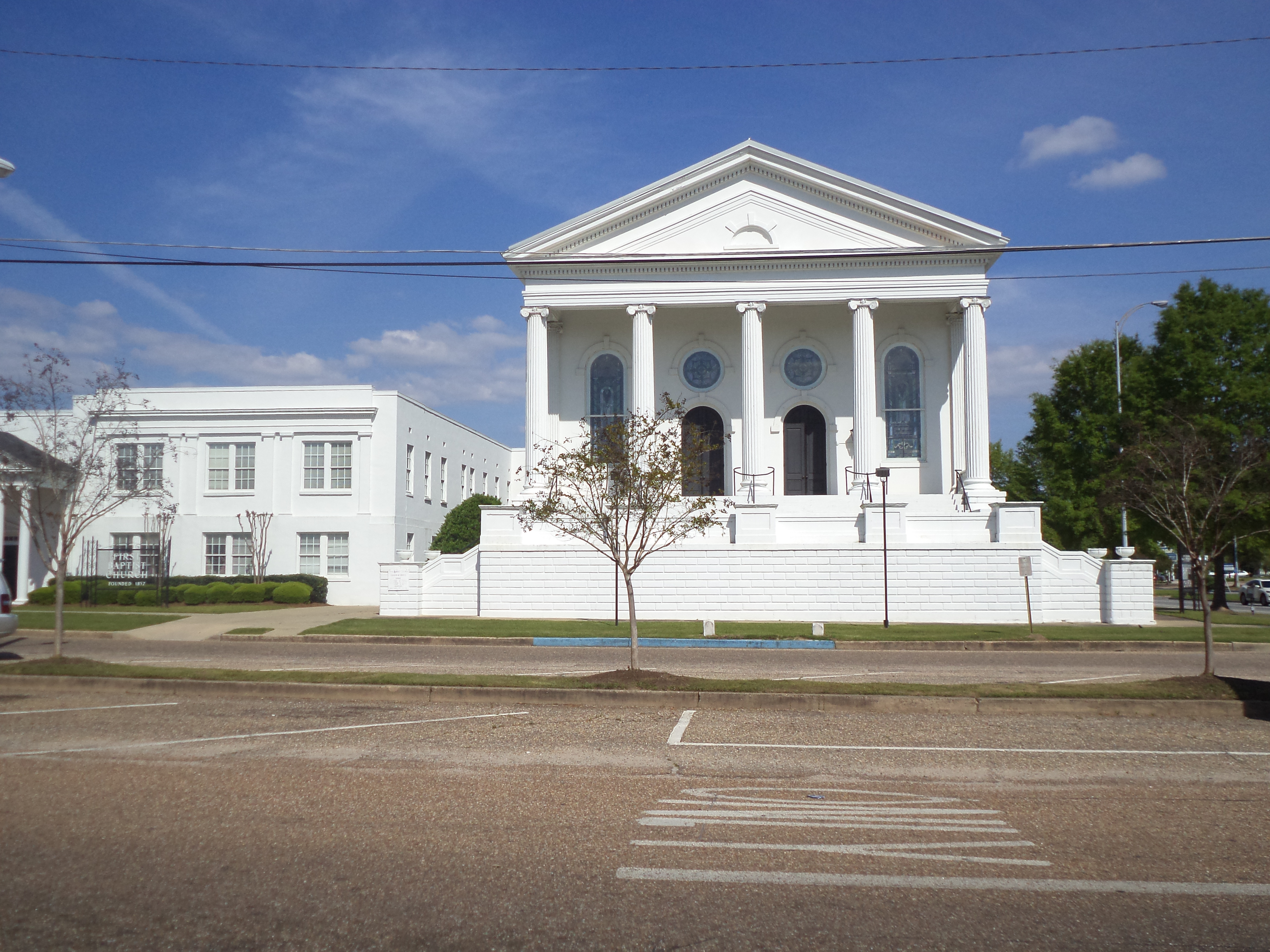
First Baptist Church of Eufaula

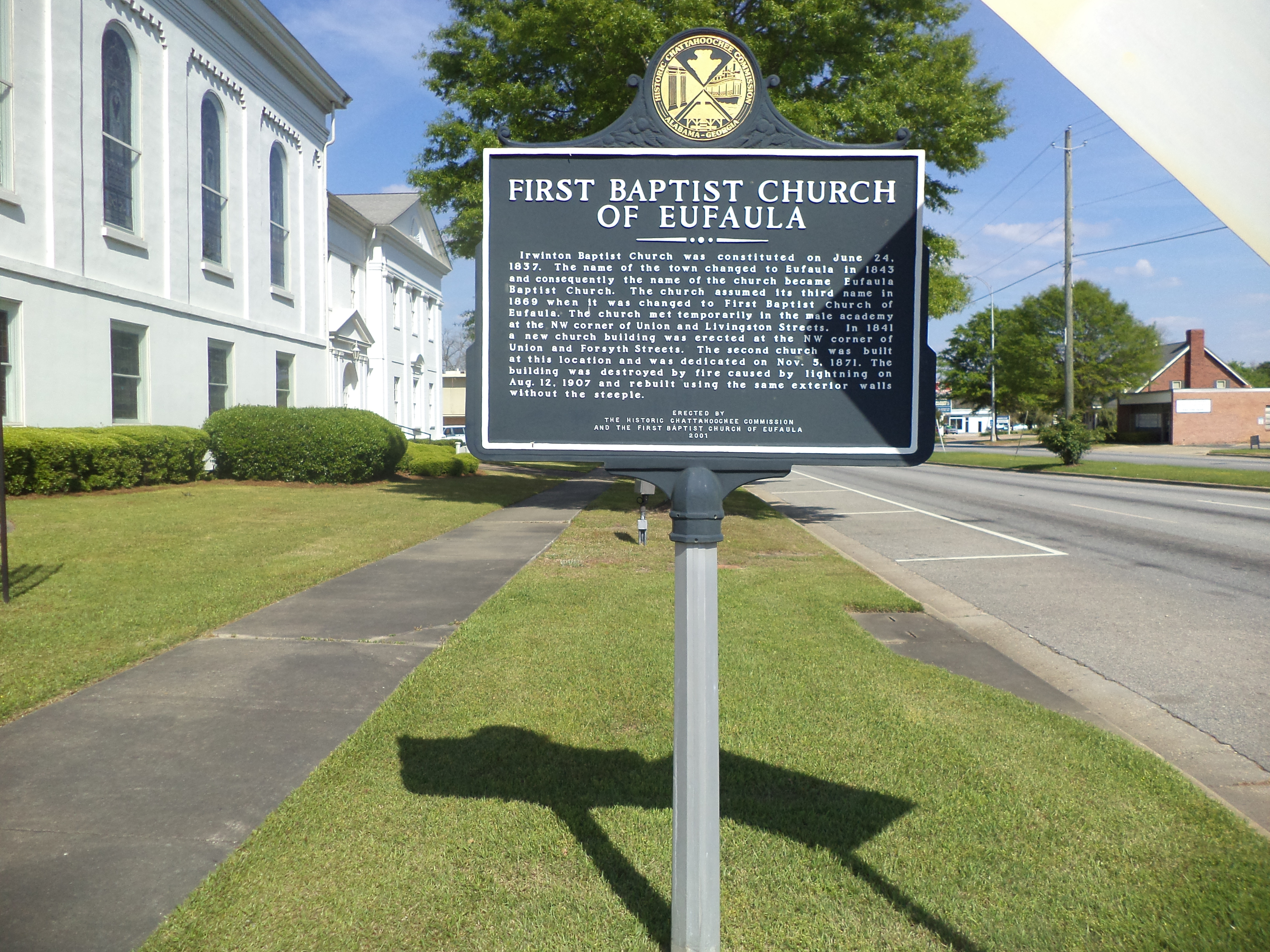
First Baptist Church of Eufaula historical marker

First Baptist Church of Eufaula is located in Eufaula, Alabama, U.S. The building is located at 125 South Randolph Street.

== Text of historical marker ==
Irwinton Baptist Church was constituted on June 24, 1837. The name of the town changed to Eufaula in 1843 and consequently the name of the church became Eufaula Baptist Church. The church assumed its third name in 1869 when it was changed to First Baptist Church of Eufaula. The church met temporarily in the male academy at the NW corner of Union and Livingston Streets. In 1841 a new church building was erected at the NW corner of Union and Forsyth Streets. The second church was built at this location and was dedicated on Nov. 5, 1871. The building was destroyed by fire caused by lightning on Aug. 12, 1907 and rebuilt using the same exterior walls without the steeple.

Erected by the Historic Chattahoochee Commission and the First Baptist Church of Eufaula, January 1, 2001.
