= Lincoln School (Huntsville, Alabama) =

- U.S. National Register of Historic Places
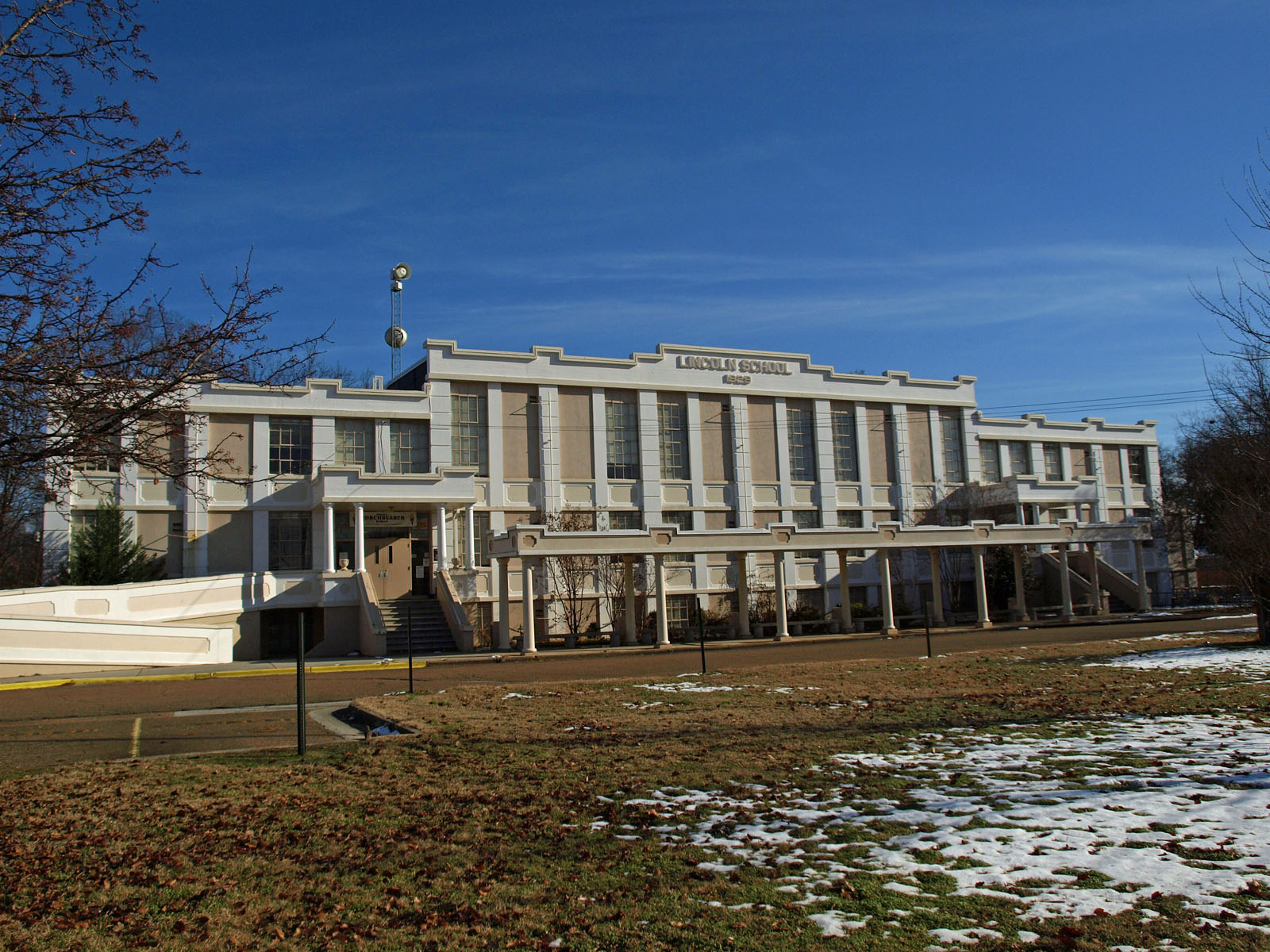
- Lincoln School in December 2010

- Location within Huntsville, Alabama Location within Alabama Location within the United States
- Location: 1110 North Meridian Street, Huntsville, Alabama
- Coordinates: 34°44′43″N 86°35′2″W
- Built: 1929
- Architectural style: Beaux Arts
- Part of: Lincoln Mill and Mill Village Historic District (ID10000200)
- NRHP reference No.: 82001608
- Added to NRHP: December 27, 1982

Lincoln School is a historic school building in Huntsville, Alabama. Built in 1929 as part of the Lincoln Mill Village, the school became part of the city school system in the 1950s. The city sold the building to a private school in 2011. It was listed on the National Register of Historic Places in 1982.

== History ==
Lincoln School was built in 1929 by the owners of the Lincoln textile mill to serve the children of the mill village. The mill opened in 1900 and was purchased in 1918 by William Lincoln Barrell. The first school in the village was a five-teacher school completed in 1923. As the mill grew, the school was expanded in 1925. By 1929, the first school was overcrowded again, and a larger, three-story structure was completed at a cost of $60,000 (equivalent to $1,125,000 in 2025).

Although the mill owned the school, the Madison County Board of Education provided teachers and administration. When it opened, the school had grades 1 through 9, adding grades until the first twelfth grade class graduated in 1935. In the mid-1950s, the mill had closed and the village was annexed into the city limits. High school and middle school students were reassigned to other schools in the city school system, and Lincoln continued to operate as an elementary school until 2010.

Despite its lower-class student body, Lincoln Elementary was one of the highest-performing schools in the state, winning state and national recognition. Huntsville City Schools also used Lincoln to train teachers at other schools. The building was sold in 2011, and a private, church-backed school, Lincoln Academy, began operating the following year.

== Architecture ==
The building is three stories, with a partially sunken first story, and constructed of cast reinforced concrete. The style is similar to that of the main mill buildings, but with Beaux-Arts details. The front and rear of the building have large, multi-pane windows separated by thick concrete columns. Its oversized structural elements led the maintenance staff to say that the building "could probably be rolled end-over-end without hurting it much." The central portion of the façade is raised 6 feet (1.8 m) to add visual emphasis and provide a higher ceiling for the third-floor auditorium. The roofline terminates with a stepped parapet. The center section is flanked by two second-floor entry porticos, each supported by four Tuscan columns. Each floor has a central hallway with classrooms on either side, with restrooms on the ends. The third floor has a large auditorium in the middle with original incandescent lights, that has been converted into a library.

== See also ==
- National Register of Historic Places listings in Madison County, Alabama
