= Big Spring Jam =

Annual music festival

Coordinates: 34°43′36″N 86°35′17″W

- Big Spring Jam logo
- Locations: Huntsville, Alabama, United States
- Years active: 1993–2011
- Website: bigspringjam.org

Big Spring Jam was an annual music festival taking place in Huntsville, Alabama. The Jam, which began in 1993, typically took place the fourth weekend in September. From 1993 to 2009, it was a three-day event beginning Friday and ending Sunday. The 2011 revival was a two-day event on Friday and Saturday only. It featured acts from all genres of music including local bands, emerging talent, oldies acts, and the top artists of the day. Along with the music, the Big Spring Jam also held an annual 5k race.

The title of the festival was a matter of confusion for many, especially those outside northern Alabama, as the Big Spring Jam was held early each autumn. The title, however, referred to the location, Big Spring International Park in downtown Huntsville.

Big Spring Jam usually featured four or more temporary stages set up throughout the park. Each stage typically featured the same genres of music throughout the weekend. One stage featured country music exclusively, another featured Christian contemporary, and the remainder of the stages were largely rock-based. To alleviate the impact of potential inclement weather, in 2011 the country music stage was moved indoors to the Propst Arena in the Von Braun Center.

Unlike most other large-scale music festivals, Big Spring Jam was a not-for-profit event, organized each year by the Huntsville Heritage Foundation in conjunction with the Von Braun Center. Proceeds from the event benefited local charities, health and human services agencies, and arts and entertainment organizations throughout North Alabama.

In later years, the Big Spring Jam suffered a tarnished reputation due to weather events. In both 2005 and 2006, some of the main acts were canceled due to inclement weather. Despite its status as a non-profit event, Big Spring Jam officials refused to refund ticket purchases after they canceled events. For example, tickets were sold after the event was rained out in 2006 - and officials refused to refund the ticket prices. Tickets were sold up until the point the event was canceled. However, the 2007 and 2008 events, where the weather was favorable, were deemed highly successful. The 2010 event was canceled due to financial and logistical issues but the event returned, as promised, in 2011.

The 2011 Big Spring Jam was a smaller, two-day event with some acts moved into the Propst Arena at the Von Braun Center, again, as a hedge against rain and storms. The 2011 event drew only 30,000 attendees, only a fraction of the 240,000 who attended in 2003, with blame placed on the smaller scope of the event, competition from high school and college football (especially the former), the economic downturn, and weather on the Jam's first day. Organizers announced in November 2011 that they would "shelve" the event for the immediate future with plans to "retool" or "recreate" it at some point when the economy improved (the severe recession of the 2008-09 period was still being felt by many area residents) and local interest increased. As of 2021, however, no plans have been announced to revive the event, so it has likely been discontinued permanently.
