= Huntsville Museum of Art =

Art museum in Huntsville, Alabama, USA

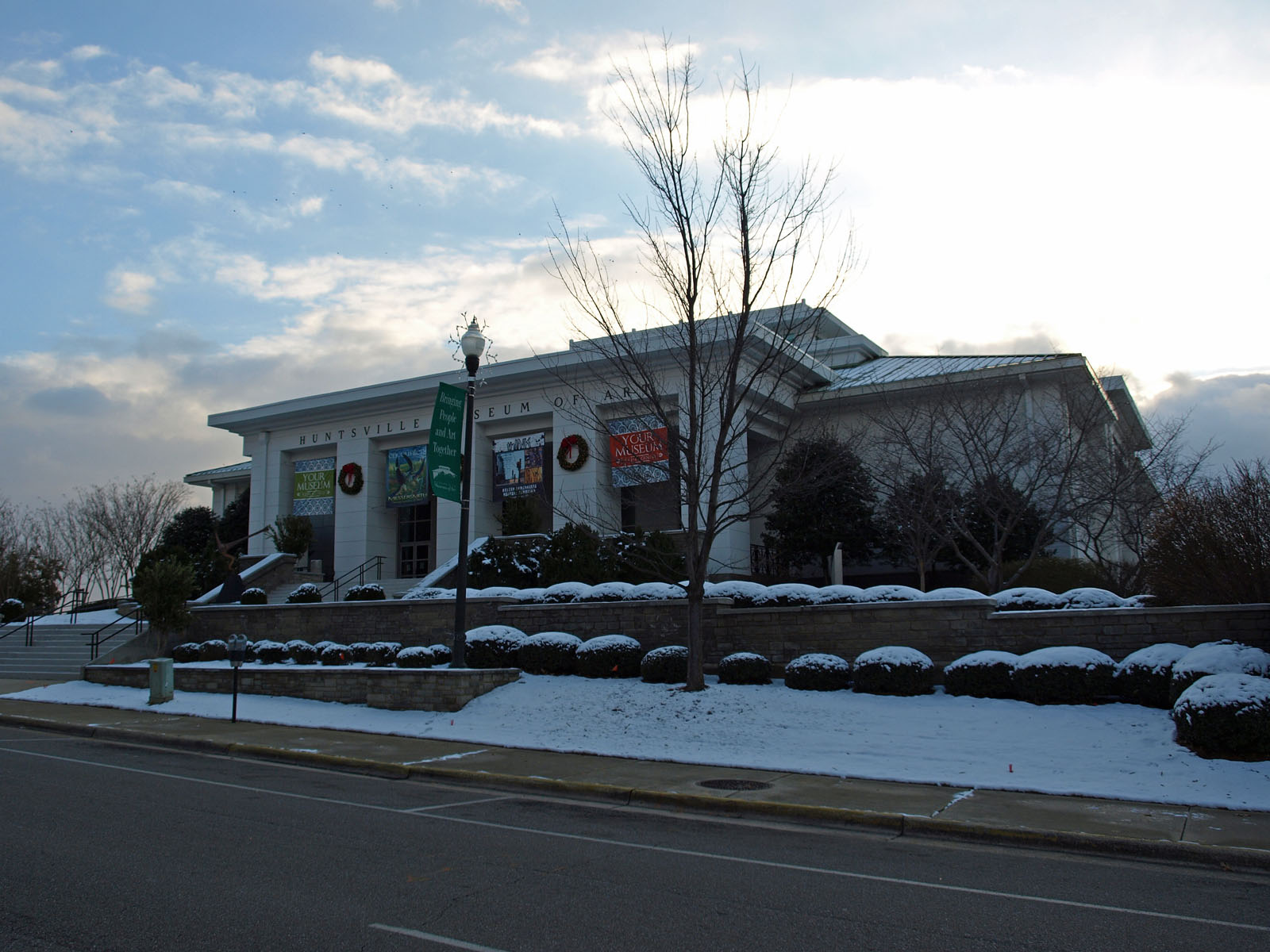
- Established: 1970
- Location: 300 Church Street Southwest Huntsville, Alabama, USA
- Coordinates: 34°43′37″N 86°35′13″W
- Type: Art museum
- Website: hsvmuseum.org

Huntsville Museum of Art (HMA) is a museum located in Huntsville, Alabama. HMA sits in Big Spring Park within Downtown Huntsville, and serves as a magnet for cultural activities.

In 1957, the Huntsville Art League and Museum Association (HALMA) was formed with the goal of growing the arts community within Huntsville and of one day having a museum. HMA was officially established by the City of Huntsville with city Ordinance No. 70-134, on August 13, 1970, which established the Museum Board of the City of Huntsville. The museum held its first exhibition in 1973 and moved to its first permanent facility at the Von Braun Center in 1975, while the rest of HALMA had to relocate to Heart of Huntsville Mall. In 1989, HALMA officially split with the museum retaining the name Huntsville Museum of Art while the rest of the organization was known as Huntsville Art League (HAL). HMA moved to its present building at Big Spring Park in March 1998 and housed seven galleries.

The museum expanded in 2010 with the Davidson Center, which includes seven new exhibition galleries, the Stender Family Education Galleries, four special event facilities, and an adjacent parking lot. The museum's 75,034 square foot facility now includes fourteen galleries covering 20,000 square feet.

The museum is a member of the North American Reciprocal Museums program.

The Huntsville Museum of Art has been awarded "Best of Bama" for Best Art Museum in the state by Alabama Magazine in 2014, 2015, 2016, 2018, 2019, and 2022.

== Collection ==
The museum's permanent collection contains more than 3,000 items. About 200 of these artworks are exhibited in a given year. The rest are kept in climate-controlled storage rooms on the museum's lower floor.

They are divided into two collections: American art and regional artists, and other arts from Asia, Africa and Europe, which influenced these artists. The growth of the collection was supported by private donations and various foundations.

Visitors can enjoy graphic works by James McNeill Whistler, John French Sloan, Joseph Stella, Robert Rauschenberg and Andy Warhol. Artists with roots in Alabama whose works are presented in the collection of the Huntsville Museum of Art including Richmond Burton, Nall Hollis, David Parrish and Stephen Rolfe Powell. There is also a Southern photography collection with over 200 works.

The museum has also acquired works which are of particular importance to Huntsville and its scientific community, such as a group of watercolors of Huntsville and the Marshall Space Flight Center by Renato Moncini, who worked for NASA as an illustrator in the Apollo program. Another work is the Moonwalk by Andy Warhol. There are also European and Japanese prints, Chinese glassware and African sculptures. The museum is also famous for its collection of animal figures made from silver, the largest in the world, and the Italian jewelry produced by Gianmaria Buccellati.

== See also ==
- Panoply Arts Festival – An annual arts festival in Huntsville, Alabama
