= John Hunt (Alabama) =

Namesake of Huntsville

John Hunt (1743–1822) was an American militiaman and land speculator who became the namesake of Huntsville, Alabama, United States. He had earlier been a printer of the laws for the North Carolina legislature and a delegate to the North Carolina convention for the ratification of the U.S. Constitution.

== Biography ==
Hunt was born in Virginia in what was then Fincastle and is now Botetourt County. He and his family moved to the part of North Carolina that was shortly to become Tennessee where he served in the local militia and as a sheriff. He also served as a clerk for the North Carolina legislature and was responsible for a number of administrative and operational tasks including printing the laws of the state. In 1788 he was a delegate to the North Carolina convention for the ratification of the U.S. Constitution. According to local historian David Byers, Hunt "voted against one proposed change to the document and then voted in favor of ratification. The vote was 195 to 77 in favor." Hunt's main source of income, however, was land speculation, such that "Over and over Hunt purchased and subdivided land and sold it in three Tennessee counties, Hawkins, Sullivan and Claiborne."

He was an early squatter in the Madison County, Alabama area in autumn 1804, which lands were still under Cherokee and Chickasaw title. Hunt and five enslaved people he legally owned were enumerated in the vicinity of Big Spring in a census taken in 1809. As told by letter writer Anne Royall in 1818, "It takes its name from a man called Captain Hunt, who built the first cabin on the spot, where the Court House now stands, in 1802. In front of this cabin, which was built on a high bluff, there was a large pond, which is now nearly filled up by the citizens. Captain Hunt cleared a small field west of his cabin, the same year. This was between his cabin and the Huntsville Spring. He spent much of his time in wageing war with the rattlesnakes, who were very numerous in his day, and had entire possession of the Bluff at the Spring. Thousands of them, it appears, were lodged amongst the rocks, and the Captain would shoot hundreds of a day, by thrusting long canes filled with powder, into the scissures of the rocks."

Leroy Pope bought the land where Hunt, his family members, and his slaves had been living, and Hunt could not afford to buy it back at the inflated prices of the Alabama real estate bubble of the 1810s. In 1810, Pope wanted the settlement's name to be Twickenham, but the other squatters had always called where they lived Hunt's Spring, so Pope was overruled and Huntsville it became. The -ville suffix was because French nomenclature was preferred to English-sounding names in the wake of the fights against the British during the Revolution.

The other settlers were said to value Hunt for his "caution" and his skill in breaking trails and identifying optimal routes for new roadways. Hunt died of tuberculosis somewhere in Madison County in 1822.

== Sources ==
- Byers, David (April 2017). "John Hunt, Huntsville's First Citizen". Huntsville Historical Review. 42 (1). 6.
- Dupre, Daniel S. (1997). Transforming the Cotton Frontier: Madison County, Alabama, 1800–1840. Baton Rouge: Louisiana State University Press. ISBN 978-0-8071-2193-1. LCCN 97016094.
- Royall, Anne Newport (1969). Griffith, Lucille (ed.). Letters from Alabama, 1817–1822. University of Alabama Press. ISBN 0817352198. LCCN 70076584.
