= Panoply (disambiguation) =

A panoply is a complete suit of armor.

Panoply may also refer to:

- the Dendra panoply, an ancient Greek suit of armour
- Panoply Media, an American digital media company and podcast network
- Panoply (software), a file viewer developed at the Goddard Institute for Space Studies
- Panoply Arts Festival, an annual three-day celebration of the arts in Huntsville, Alabama
