= Huntsville Executive Airport =

Airport in Alabama, US

Huntsville Executive Airport Tom Sharp Jr. Field
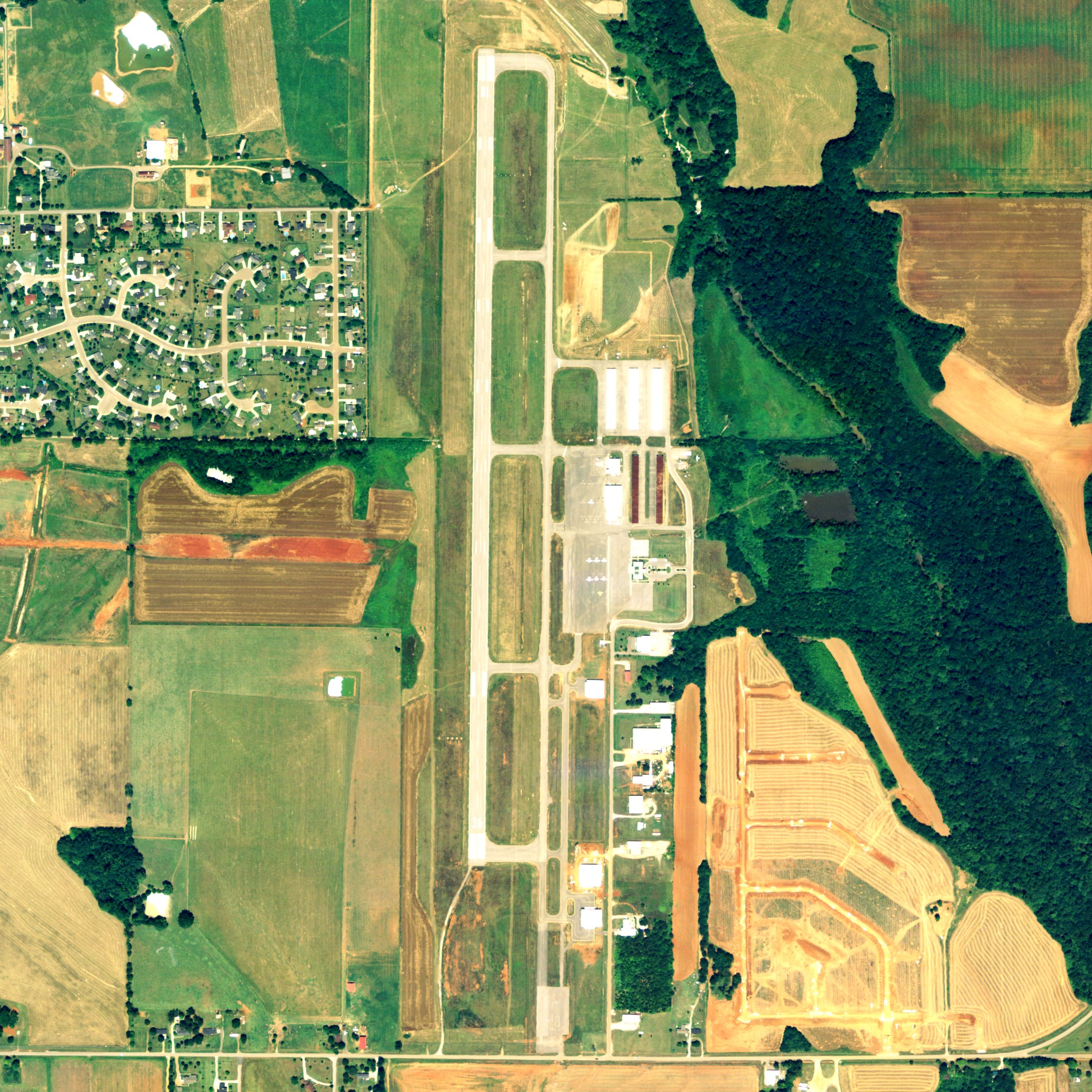
- NAIP aerial image, 2006
- IATA: none; ICAO: KMDQ; FAA LID: MDQ

Summary
- Airport type: Public
- Owner: Madison County Executive Airport Authority
- Serves: Huntsville, Alabama
- Elevation AMSL: 756 ft (230 m)
- Coordinates: 34°51′41″N 086°33′27″W
- Website: http://www.executiveflightcenter.com
- Interactive map of Huntsville Executive Airport

Runways
Direction	Length		Surface
Direction	ft	m	Surface
18/36	6,500	1,526	Asphalt

Statistics (2009)
- Aircraft operations: 34,260
- Based aircraft: 102
- Sources: FAA, airport website

Huntsville Executive Airport (ICAO: KMDQ, FAA LID: MDQ, formerly M82), also known as Tom Sharp Jr. Field and formerly Madison County Executive Airport, is a public-use airport in Madison County, Alabama, United States. It is owned by the Executive Flight Center and located eight nautical miles (14.80 km) northeast of the central business district of Huntsville. According to the FAA's National Plan of Integrated Airport Systems for 2009–2013, it is categorized as a general aviation facility.

Although most U.S. airports use the same three-letter location identifier for the FAA and IATA, Huntsville Executive Airport is assigned MDQ by the FAA but has no designation from the IATA (which assigned MDQ to Mar del Plata, Argentina).

== Facilities and aircraft ==
The airport covers an area of 485 acres (196 ha) at an elevation of 756 feet (230 m) above mean sea level. It has one runway designated 18/36 with an asphalt surface measuring 6,500 by 100 feet (1,981 x 30 m). A 1,500-foot runway extension opened July 1, 2013.

For the 12-month period ending April 16, 2009, the airport had 34,260 aircraft operations, an average of 93 per day: 93% general aviation, 5% air taxi, and 2% military. At that time there were 102 aircraft based at this airport: 82% single-engine, 9% multi-engine, 2% jet and 7% helicopter.

== Accidents and incidents ==
On March 5, 1997, a Cessna Centurion T210L (N2142S) crashed on takeoff from Huntsville Executive Airport. The pilot and his two passengers were fatally injured. According to the NTSB, the cause of the crash was the pilot's decision to take off with a significant tailwind.

On September 8, 2022, a Piper Arrow PA-28R-200 (N29RM) owned by the Redstone Arsenal Flying Club crashed 200 feet short of the runway. The instrument-rated private pilot and the Certificated Flight Instructor survived the crash.

== See also ==
- List of airports in Alabama
