= Lincoln Mill and Mill Village Historic District =

- U.S. National Register of Historic Places
- U.S. Historic district
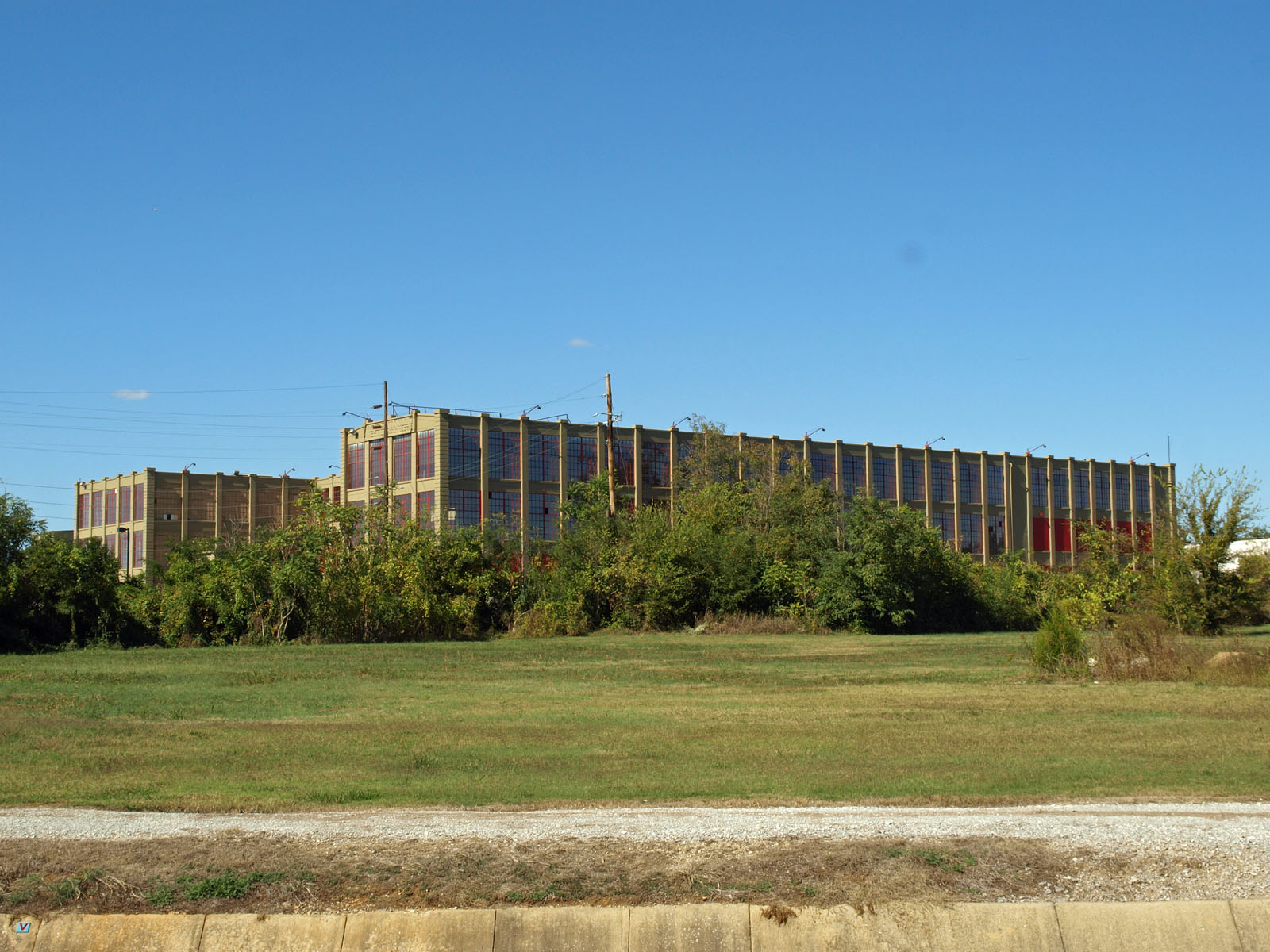
- Mill No. 3 in October 2011

- Location within Huntsville, Alabama Location within Alabama Location within the United States
- Location: Bounded by Meridian St., Oakwood Ave., Front St., Mountain View Dr., Davidson St., Cottage St, and King Ave., Huntsville, Alabama
- Coordinates: 34°44′49″N 86°34′57″W
- Area: 52 acres (21 ha)
- Architectural style: Bungalow/Craftsman, Colonial Revival
- NRHP reference No.: 10000200
- Added to NRHP: April 26, 2010

The Lincoln Mill and Mill Village Historic District is a historic district in Huntsville, Alabama. Opened in 1900, it quickly grew to be Huntsville's largest cotton mill in the first quarter of the 20th century. After closing in 1955, the mills were converted to office space that was used by the U.S. space program. Two of the older production buildings burned in 1980, but one main building and numerous houses built for workers remain. The district was listed on the National Register of Historic Places in 2010.

== History ==
The Lincoln Mill began in 1900 as an entirely locally funded concern. One of the investors was Trevanian Dallas, founder of the adjacent Dallas Mill. Named the Madison Spinning Company, the original building was built on Oakwood Avenue. The mill required more capital to continue operating by 1903, and outside investors were brought in, including William Lincoln Barrell. Despite the extra cash, the mill closed in 1906. It reopened in 1908 under the name Abingdon Mills. Abingdon constructed a new mill building in 1915, and an addition to it in 1916. The mill was expanded again in 1918, with a two-story addition to the twisting mill, bringing capacity to 28,080 spindles and 476 looms. 47 houses and the village's first school were also built.

Despite the extra capacity, Abingdon went bankrupt in 1918. Barrell bought the company at auction, and production resumed later that year under the name Lincoln Mill. The next decade saw vast expansion of the mill and village. The company began constructing 40 more duplexes and apartment buildings north of Oakwood Avenue, on a tight grid pattern of streets which became known as Lincoln Village. A new mill building, costing $2 million and containing 750,000 square feet (70,000 sq. m.), was built in 1923–24. A one-story dye house quickly followed, and the mill employed 1,000 workers and operated 102,000 spindles. 600 additional houses and apartments were built to serve the expanded workforce. Another expansion in 1927 included more units for Mill No. 3 and 500 houses and apartments south of the mill. The expansion brought the operation to its highest capacity of 120,000 spindles, 1,200 looms, and 2,000 employees. In 1928, a mill store and community center were built, followed the next year by a larger school.

Production slowed during the Great Depression, and ground to a halt in 1934. From July 17 until September 22, 1934, a strike by the United Textile Workers of America brought violence to Huntsville. Although business rebounded during World War II, no further expansions of the mill or village were made. In 1953, longtime superintendent Phillip W. Peeler retired, and the new management clashed often with the union. Another strike in 1955 turned violent, and lawsuits reached the Supreme Court, but were not heard before the mill closed. The mill buildings were converted to offices, some of which were used by the space industry; the Apollo Lunar Roving Vehicle was designed in the mill by Brown Engineering. The oldest two mills, along Oakwood Avenue, were destroyed by fire in February 1980. The remaining Mill No. 3 has been renovated to house a variety of tenants, including offices, a microbrewery, loft apartments, and a school focusing on children with learning disabilities. The remodeling focuses on using sustainable practices.

== Architecture ==
The only surviving production structures are Mill No. 3 and the adjoining dye house, both built in 1924. Both buildings are of reinforced concrete which was cast in place. The defining feature of the buildings are floor-to-ceiling multi-pane windows with steel muntins. The Lincoln School, built in 1929 and separately listed on the National Register in 1982, echos this design, with large bays of windows separated by thick, concrete pilasters, although it contains more decorative details. The company store, today used as a theater and antique shop, retains the same proportions but has more conventional windows along with street-level storefronts.

The remaining structures in the district are all residential. Most prominent is the two-story, Colonial Revival Superintendent's House along Meridian Street, that has been renovated as offices for an adjacent auto repair shop. The majority of the workers houses are duplexes, although there are also twelve extant apartment buildings and a handful of single-family homes. The majority follow the Type M plan, of a one-story, hipped roof duplex that is two rooms deep. The double entries are covered with a shed roofed porch. The apartments follow the Type M style, but have multiple units attached to one another, and separate, gable roof porches. Other styles include Type B, a rectangular, gable roofed plan with closely spaced entrance doors; Type D, a one-story plan with a central chimney and steeper gable roof; Type E, an L-shaped structure with a shed porch on the front; and Type H, a 1 1/2-story single-family design with a gable roof and shed roof dormer. Though mostly undecorated, the houses do show some basic Craftsman detail, such as exposed wood rafter ends. All houses are of wood-frame construction covered in stucco.
