= Big Spring Park (Huntsville, Alabama) =

- Big Spring
- U.S. National Register of Historic Places
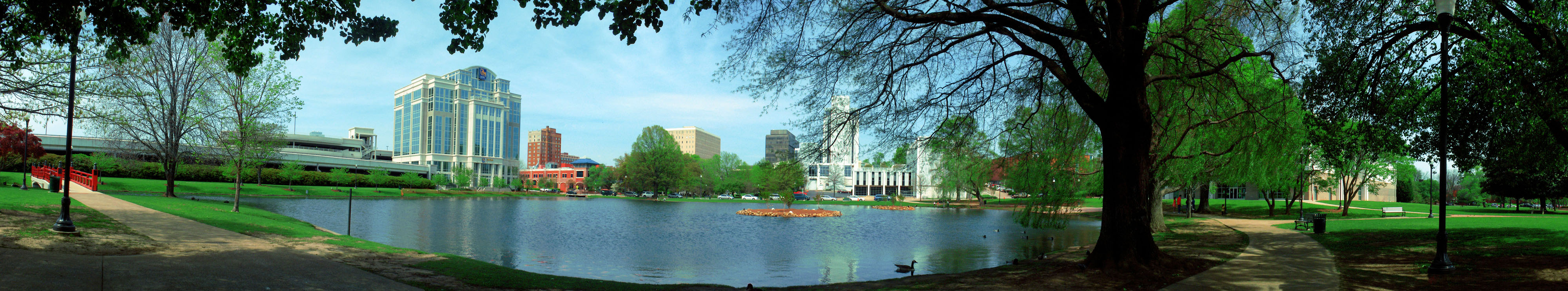
- Big Spring Park

- Location within Huntsville, Alabama Location within Alabama Location within the United States
- Location: W. Side Sq., Huntsville, Alabama
- Coordinates: 34°43′47″N 86°35′9″W
- Area: 12.5 acres (5.1 ha) (park)
- MPS: Downtown Huntsville MRA
- NRHP reference No.: 80000704
- Added to NRHP: September 22, 1980

Big Spring International Park (also known as Big Spring Park) is a large park located in downtown Huntsville, Alabama. The park was built around its namesake "Big Spring", the original water source that the city of Huntsville was built around. The Huntsville Museum of Art and Von Braun Center are located in the park. The park is also notable as the venue for the Panoply Arts Festival, held the last full weekend in April, Big Spring Jam, an annual music festival held on the fourth weekend in September from 1993 to 2011, and The Battle of the Buffalo, a buffalo wings competition held by the University of Alabama in Huntsville Alpha Tau Omega fraternity to support cancer research.

Big Spring Park is the expected trail head of the future Singing River Trail of North Alabama. A 70-mile bicycling and walking trail, it will connect Huntsville to Madison, Decatur, and Athens with an extended path along the Tennessee River.

== The Big Spring ==
"Huntsville is situated around the finest spring in the world; the spring forms a semicircle 100 feet wide, and at a trivial expense the stream can be made navigable for batteaux to the Tennessee river; which is only ten miles distant."
- future U.S. Senator John Williams Walker, 1815

to his friend and US Secretary of War William H. Crawford

The Big Spring is a large, underground karst spring. Hearing of the abundant water source and plentiful big game, John Hunt, Huntsville's founder, sought out the spring and settled near it in 1805 on the bluff above, which later became the site of the First National Bank of Huntsville. Isaac and Joseph Criner had previously reached the Big Spring and considered settlement, but due to the presence of bears and mosquitoes left to settle New Market instead. During the 19th century and the first half of the 20th century, the spring was Huntsville's water source, due to its massive flow. The Big Spring is the largest limestone spring in North Alabama, with its usual flow between 7 and 20 million US gallons (76,000 m^{3}) per day, depending on the time of the year.

From 1827 to the early 1840s, what would later become the park grounds served as the site of the Fearn Canal, built from 1821 to 1824. The canal was built by the Indian Creek Navigation Company, led by local resident Dr. Thomas Fearn. It linked downtown Huntsville and the spring to the Tennessee River, allowing traders to bypass a costly wagon haul of about 11 miles South to the nearest river port, Ditto's Landing in the town of Whitesburg. The canal eventually became obsolete upon the construction of railroads.

The Big Spring also served as the source of the city's water supply from settlement to the late 1960s when the Tennessee Valley Authority built the water treatment plant on the Tennessee River. The first pumphouse was built in the 1830s. It was enclosed in the 1850s. A water turbine pushed water up the bluffs through cedar pipes to reach the city's residents. Until 1840, the city waterwork's system was privately owned by the family of settler LeRoy Pope. His son sold the land to the city cheaply on the condition his heirs received their water for free and that the space around the Big Spring Basin would be open to the public. The first pumphouse was torn down in 1860 prior to the American Civil War and replaced by the second pumphouse made out of stone. New pumps were put in but little changed during the war. In 1890, the second pumphouse was extended with a new wing and smokestack to meet the new water needs as the city expanded and the new Monte Sano Hotel opened. This pumphouse was torn down by Col. Hiram M. Chittenden of the U.S. Army Corps of Engineers in 1899, and the waterworks system was moved further into the city. The third pumphouse would stand near California Street until the 1960s, when the water treatment plant would be built on the Tennessee River.

== The Park ==
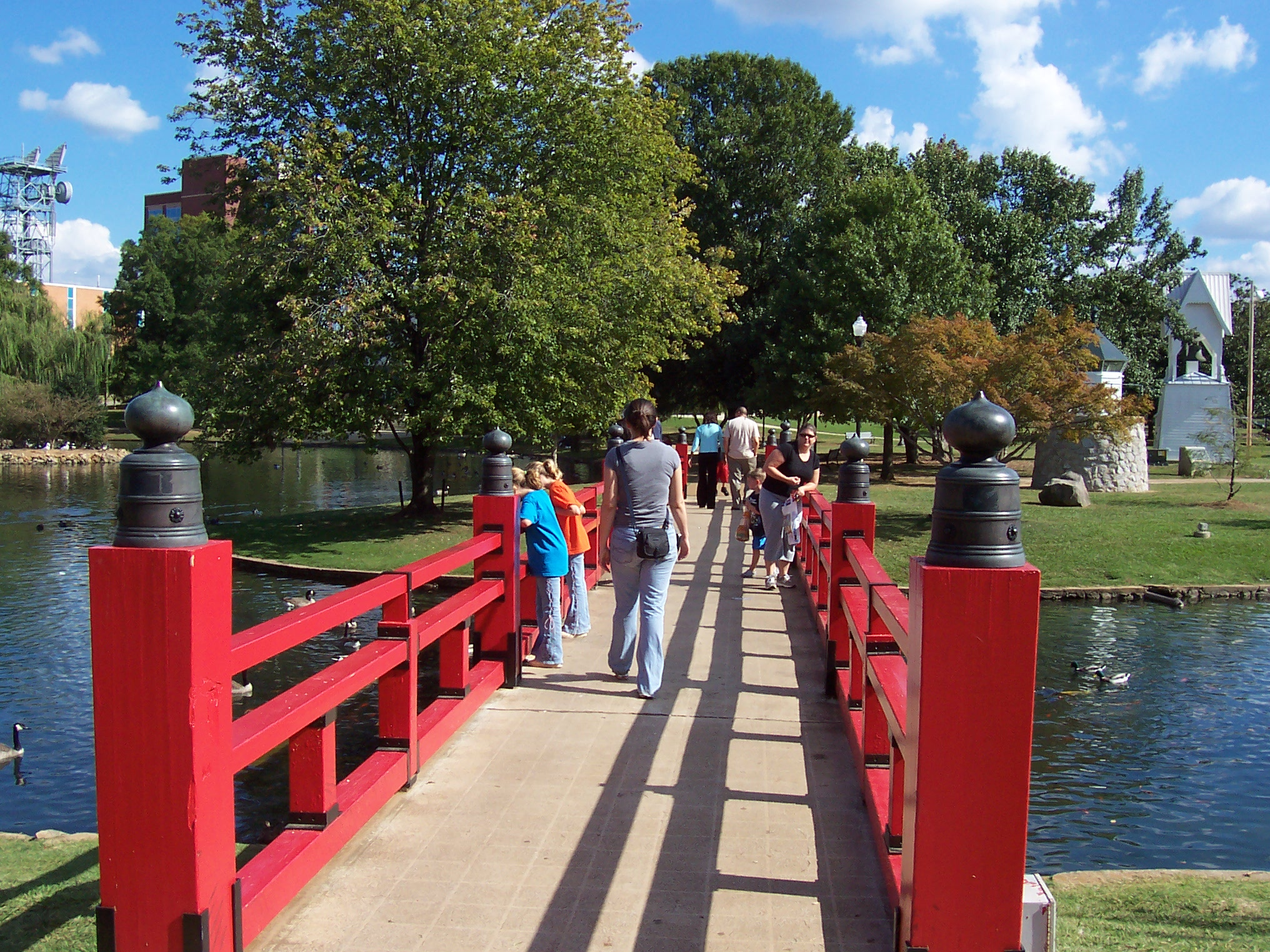
The Japanese bridge in Big Spring Park

Big Spring Park is named for a spring named "the big spring" by the indigenous Cherokee and Chickasaw. The original park site is situated in downtown Huntsville, starting from the west side of the courthouse square, and extending about two blocks southwest. This part of the park includes the spring itself and a canal extending to the rest of the park. The park's construction began September 21, 1898, under the direction of Chittenden of the U.S. Army Corps of Engineers, stationed at the park during the Spanish–American War. Col. Chittenden became interested in the park and the source of the Big Spring. While exploring the source of the Big Spring, he discovered that horse waste from the courthouse square above was seeping into the city's water supply that the Big Spring produced. Col. Chittenden and his men tore down the pumphouse located at the basin of the Big Spring, put in a fountain, and lined the canal from 1898 to 1901. The park expanded across Church Street to the space which now has the park's lagoon in 1968. In 2005, the park underwent additional expansion across Monroe Street to include a $284,000 fountain and a canal alongside the Von Braun Center.

Today the park prominently features gifts given by other countries and foreign nationals to the city of Huntsville, including a 1903 light beacon (often referred to as "the lighthouse") and a 1929 fog bell given by Norway in 1973. Other smaller gifts include a bench from the United Kingdom and a sundial from Germany.

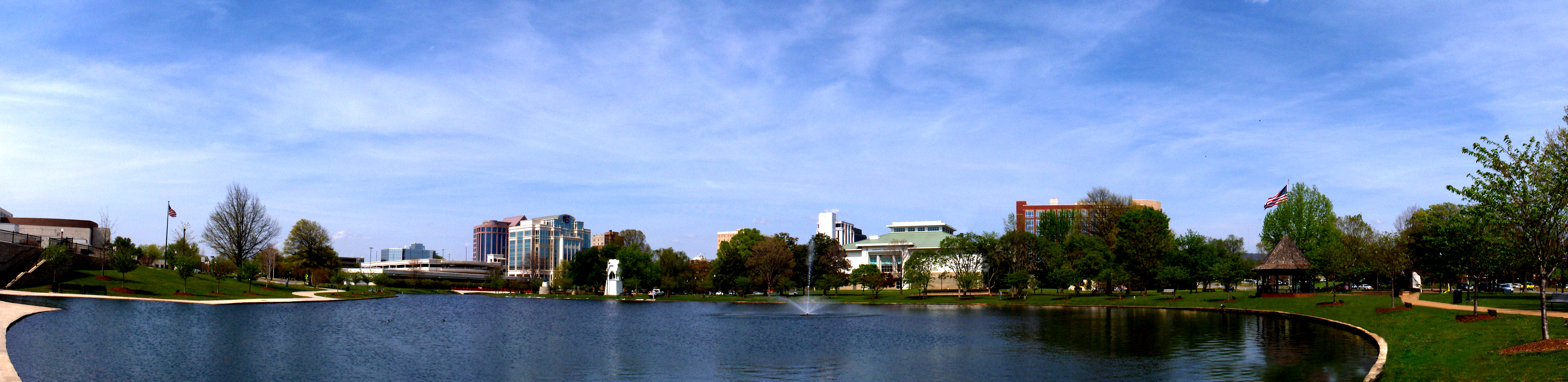
Big Spring Park

The most recognizable gifts, however, are the iconic red Japanese bridge and cherry trees, given by Japanese Major General Mikio Kimata. From 1964 to 1966, Kimata, then a Lieutenant Colonel, attended Redstone Arsenal's Ordnance Guided Missile School program. As thanks to the city for its hospitality when hosting him, Kimata donated the original 60 Yoshino Cherry trees. He followed up on this gift with the donation of a "friendship bridge" to celebrate the United States Bicentennial. The bridge was formally dedicated on May 3, 1977. In 1998, Kimata and the Japanese Society of Alabama partially financed a major $36,000 renovation of the bridge. The bridge was restyled, expanded, and given a gentler slope.

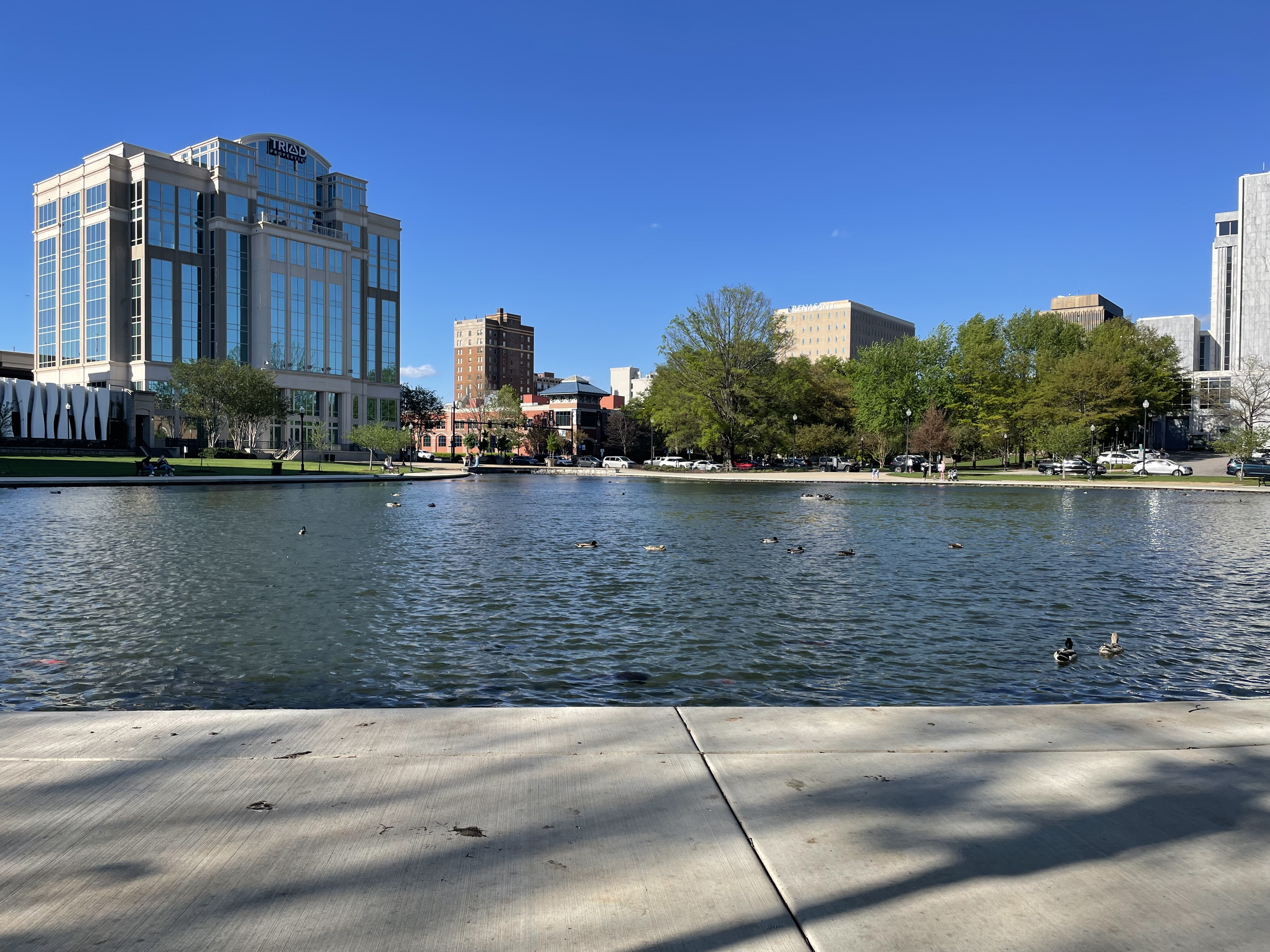
Big Spring Park in 2024

A final gift, restored to its proper place in 1995, was the marble lion that sits near the Big Spring Fountain. The city was given the marble lion to commemorate the opening of the park. In the late 1960s, it had been pushed into the canal by vandals. It was salvaged and restored in 1995.

The park served as a major filming location in Constellation, a 2005 feature film.

Big Spring Park was one of the locations of a George Floyd protest that occurred on June 3, 2020, which was ended by Huntsville Police along with SWAT and Incident Response Team using tear gas, pepper spray, and rubber bullets.

== See also ==
- Parks and Greenways in Huntsville
