= Panoply Arts Festival =

Celebration of the arts in Huntsville, Alabama, US

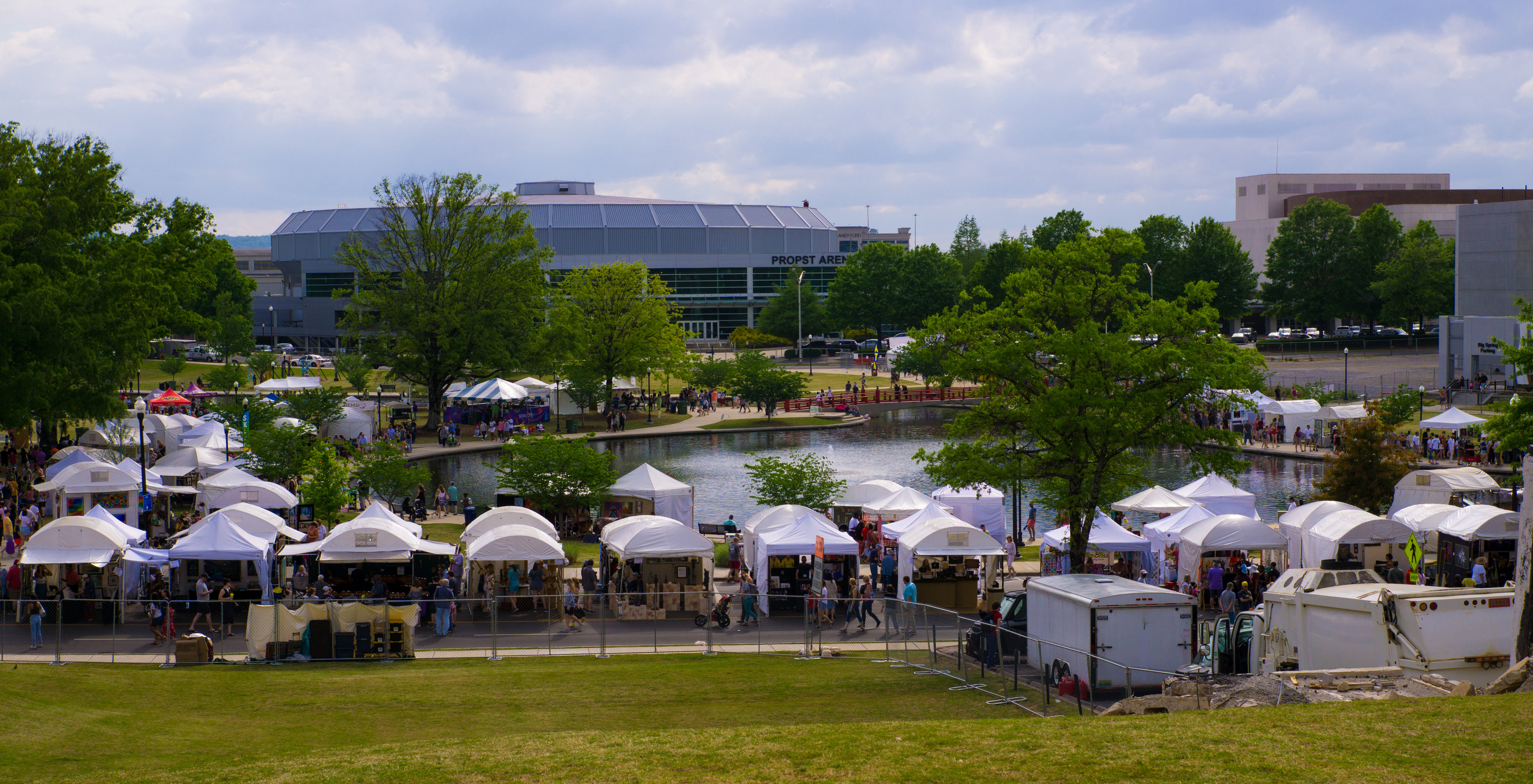
- Panoply Arts Festival 2022
- Status: Active
- Genre: Arts festival
- Frequency: Annual
- Venue: Big Spring Park
- Location: Huntsville, Alabama
- Coordinates: 34°43′37″N 86°35′16″W
- Country: United States
- Years active: 44
- Previous event: 24-26 April, 2026
- Next event: 23-25 April, 2027
- Website: www.artshuntsville.org/event/panoply/

The Panoply Arts Festival is an annual three-day celebration of the arts in Huntsville, Alabama. The first festival opened on May 14, 1982. The outdoor festival celebrates the arts with a wide array of performances, exhibits, demonstrations, and hands-on activities.

Panoply is a production of The Arts Council, Inc., a non-profit organization, with sponsorship by Huntsville-area businesses and volunteer support from up to as many as 2,000 people each year. The festival is held annually on the last full weekend of April in downtown Huntsville's Big Spring International Park and Von Braun Center.

Over the years, Panoply has evolved into one of the region's largest festivals, featuring activities and events like the "Global Village" – a gateway to the Huntsville area's diverse cultures – to children's "make-n-take" activities to the "Official Alabama State Fiddling Championship," "Homegrown Talent Contest," and "MOVA Songwriters' Competition." Panoply has had record attendances of over 100,000 in 2007, 2008, and 2009. The Southeast Tourism Society has ranked the festival among its "Top Twenty Events".

The 2011 festival was cancelled because of the Super Outbreak of tornadoes that occurred several days before the event was to take place, which deprived the area of electricity. In 2020, it became a virtual event due to the COVID-19 pandemic.
