= Huntsville, Alabama =

City in the United States

Huntsville
- City
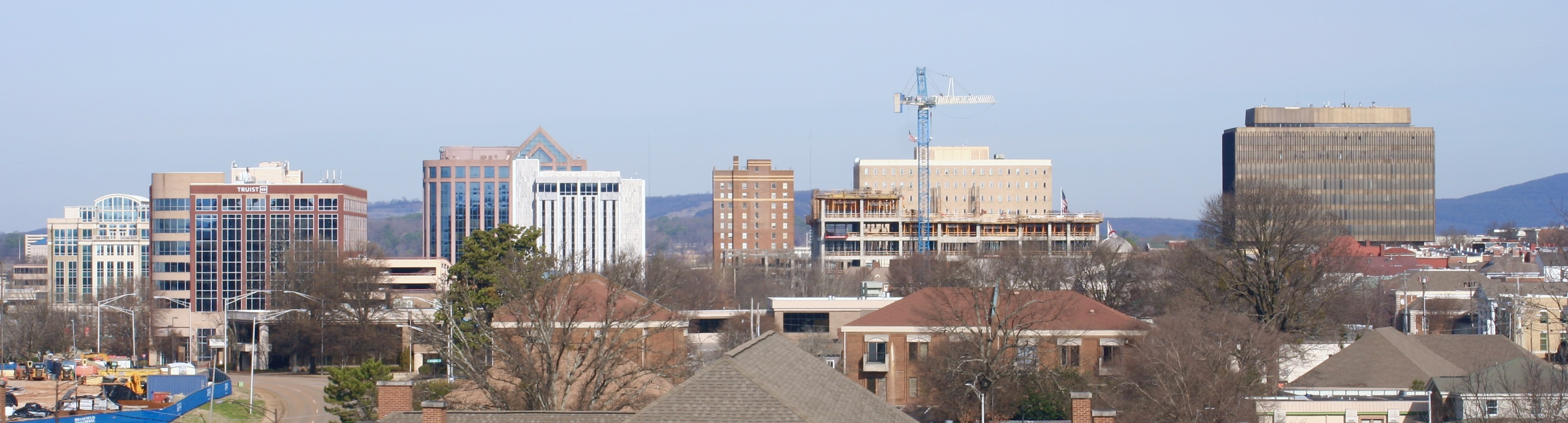
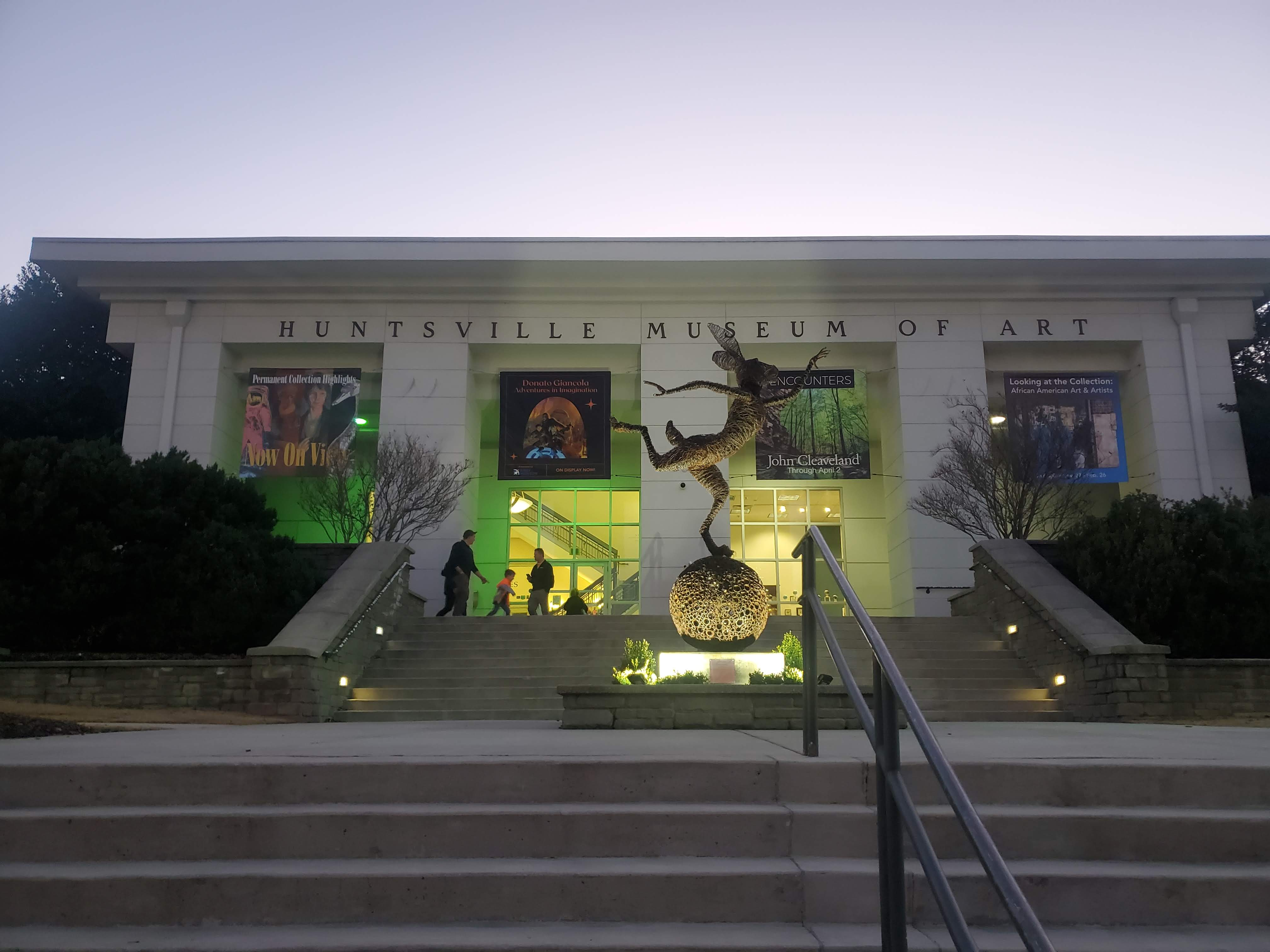
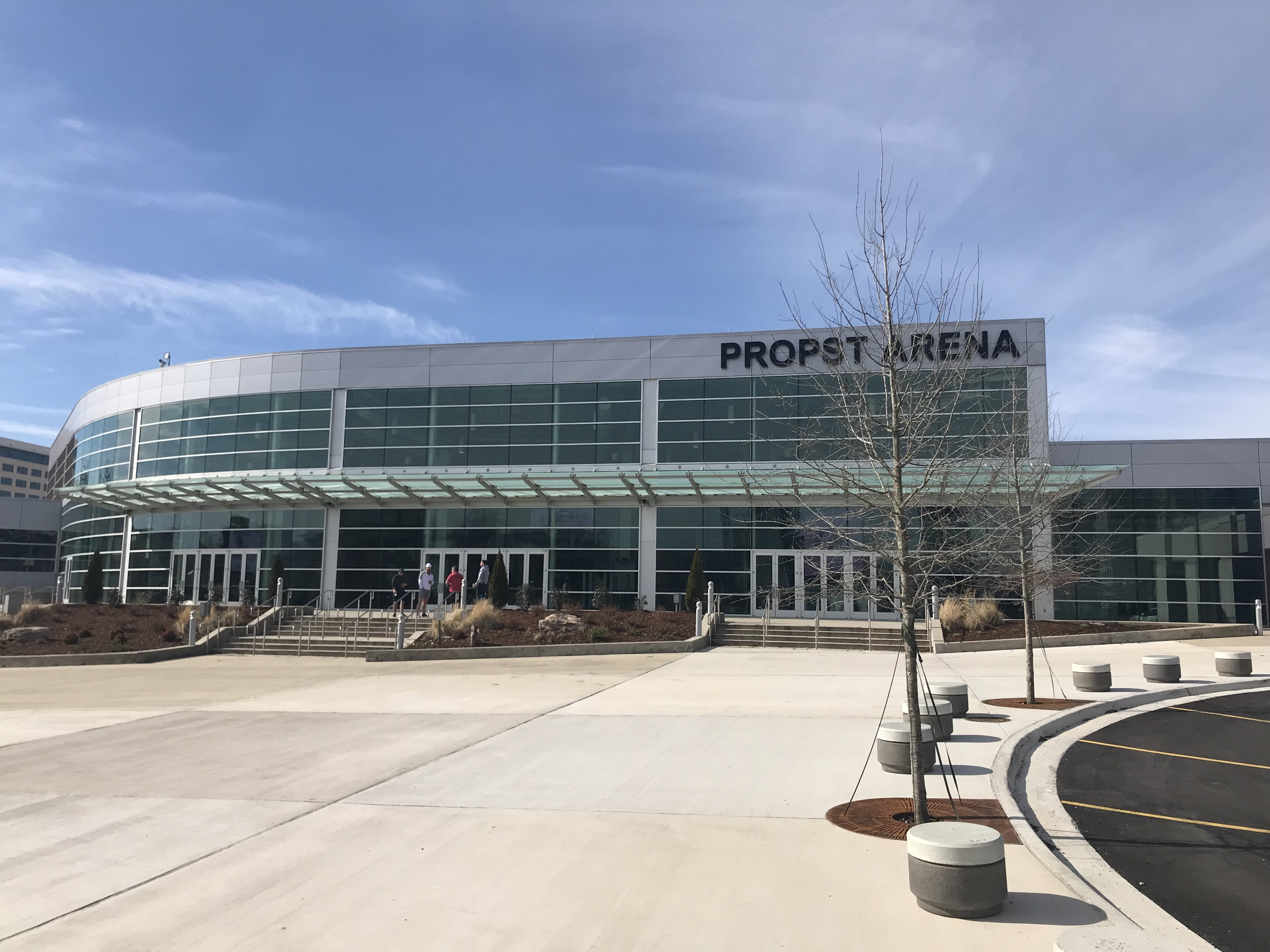
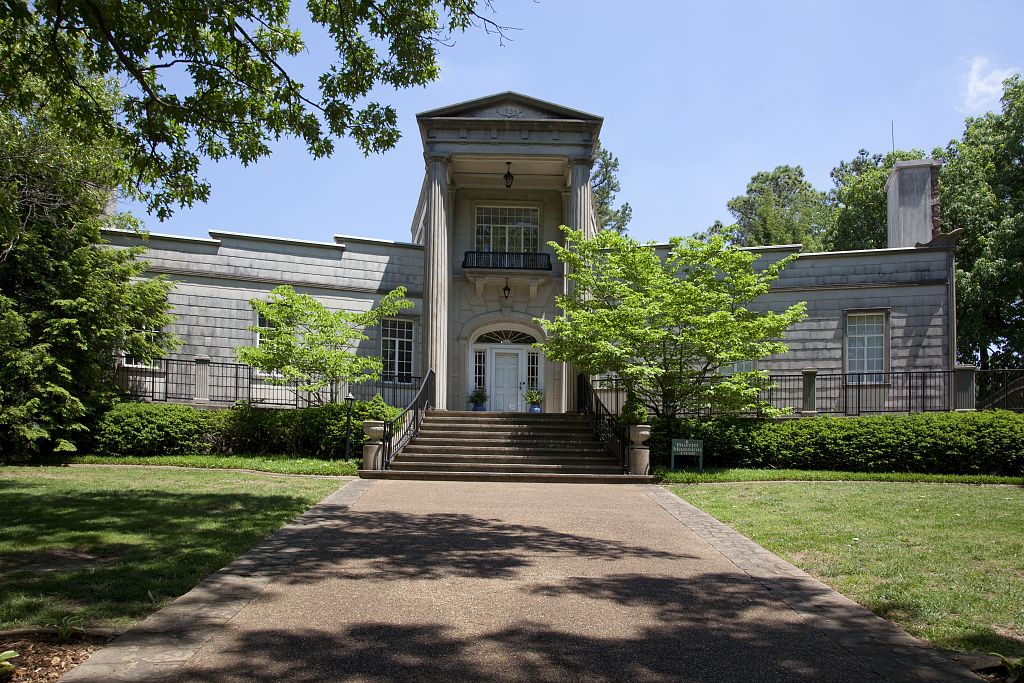
- Downtown Huntsville Huntsville Museum of Art U.S. Space & Rocket Center Propst Arena Burritt on the Mountain

- Seal Logo
- Nickname: Rocket City
- Motto: "Star of Alabama"
- Interactive map of Huntsville
- Location within Alabama Location within the United States
- Coordinates: 34°41′36″N 86°33′39″W
- Country: United States
- State: Alabama
- Counties: Madison, Limestone, Morgan, Marshall
- Established (as Twickenham): December 23, 1809
- Incorporated (town): December 9, 1811
- Incorporated (city): February 24, 1860
- Founder: LeRoy Pope
- Named for: John Hunt

Government
  - Type: Mayor–Council
  - Mayor: Tommy Battle (R)

Area
  - City: 225.2 sq mi (583 km^{2})
  - Land: 223.6 sq mi (579 km^{2})
  - Water: 1.54 sq mi (4.0 km^{2})
- Elevation: 577 ft (176 m)

Population (2020)
  - City: 215,006
  - Estimate (2025): 233,627 ▲
  - Rank: US: 100th(2025); AL: 1st
  - Density: 1,006/sq mi (388.3/km^{2})
  - Urban: 329,066 (US: 122nd) 20,165 (Southeast)
  - Urban density: 1,532/sq mi (591.6/km^{2})
  - Metro: 556,444 (US: 107th)
  - Metro density: 378/sq mi (145.9/km^{2})
  - Combined: 879,315 (US: 68th)
  - Combined density: 255.3/sq mi (98.57/km^{2})
- Demonym: Huntsvillian
- Time zone: UTC−6 (Central (CST))
  - Summer (DST): UTC−5 (CDT)
- ZIP Codes: 35801–35816, 35824, 35893–35899
- Area codes: 256 and 938
- FIPS code: 01-37000
- GNIS feature ID: 2404746
- Website: huntsvilleal.gov

Huntsville is the most populous city in the U.S. state of Alabama. The population was 215,006 at the 2020 census, making it the 100th-most populous city in the U.S., while the Huntsville metropolitan area has an estimated 542,000 residents and is the second-most populous metropolitan area in the state. As of July 1, 2025, the city's population was estimated to be 233,627 – an 8.7% increase since the 2020 Census. This makes it among the top 20 fastest growing cities in the US. Huntsville is the county seat of Madison County, with portions extending into Limestone County, Marshall County, and Morgan County.

Huntsville is located in the Appalachian region of northern Alabama, south of the state of Tennessee. It was founded within the Mississippi Territory in 1805 and became an incorporated town in 1811. When Alabama was admitted as a state in 1819, Huntsville was designated for a year as the first capital, before the state capitol was moved to more central settlements. The city developed across nearby hills north of the Tennessee River, adding textile mills in the late nineteenth century.

Major growth in Huntsville took place in the decades following World War II. During the war, the U.S. Army established Redstone Arsenal in the vicinity, with a chemical weapons plant and related facilities. After the war, additional research was conducted at Redstone Arsenal on rockets, followed by adaptations for space exploration. NASA's Marshall Space Flight Center, the United States Army Aviation and Missile Command, the FBI's operational support headquarters and most recently the United States Space Command, all were sited at Redstone Arsenal.

== History ==
=== Early history ===
Due to settlement pressures after the United States gained independence, this area had become largely empty of indigenous peoples by the turn of the 19th century. An Indian trader and boatman named James Ditto established himself at a landing on the river prior to American settlement. Revolutionary War veteran John Hunt was a pioneer in 1805 on land around the Big Spring. The US negotiated an 1805 treaty with the Chickasaw and an 1806 treaty with the Cherokee who ceded their claims to land to the federal government.

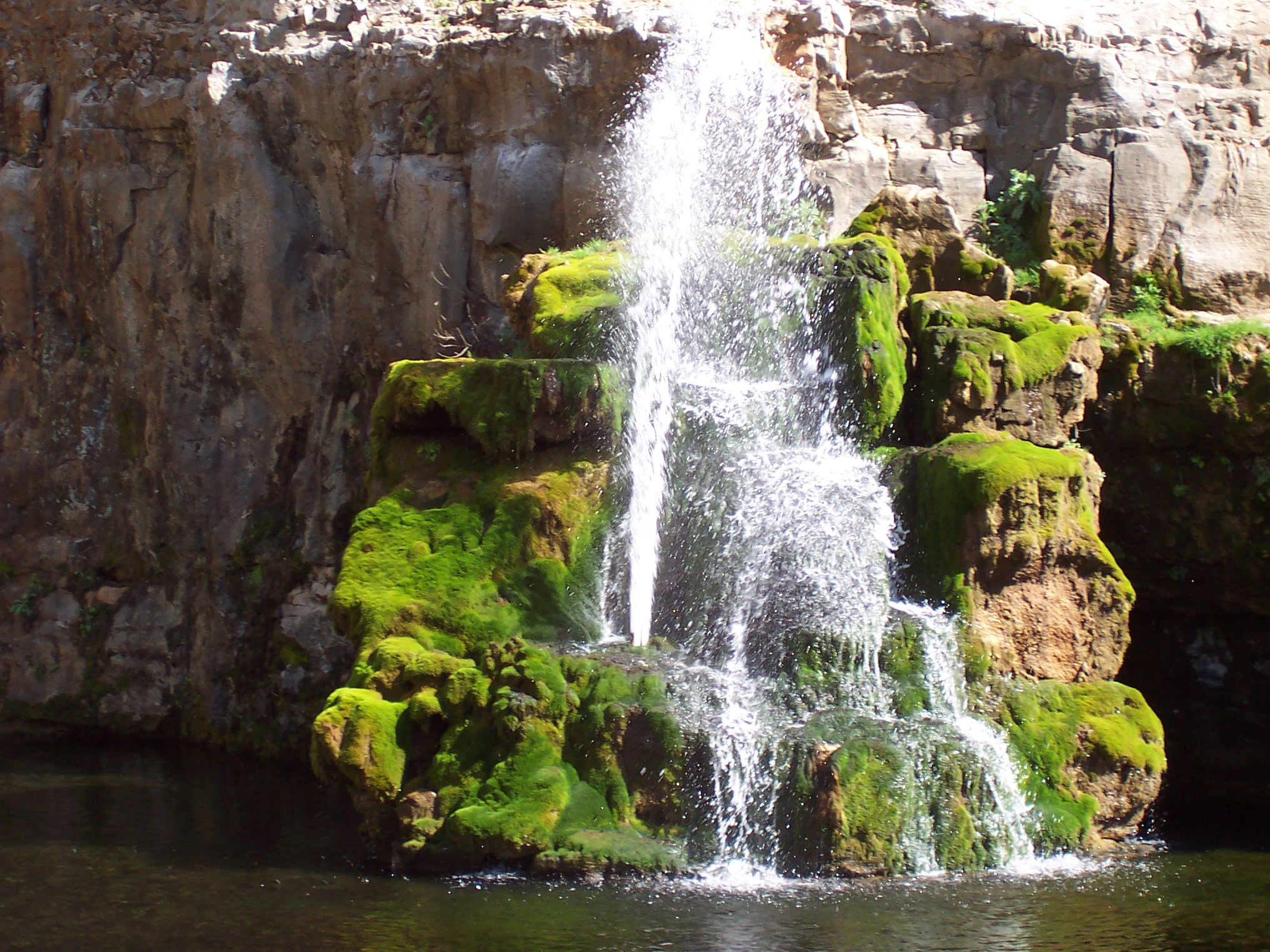
The Big Spring, the center of the street plan in Twickenham (renamed "Huntsville" in 1812)

The area was subsequently purchased by LeRoy Pope, who named it Twickenham after the home village of his distant kinsman Alexander Pope. Thomas Freeman and Pharoah Roach started government surveys in 1805. Twickenham was carefully planned, with streets laid out in a northeast to southwest direction based on the flow of Big Spring. Given anti-British sentiment during this period after the Revolution and with tensions leading to the War of 1812, in 1811 the town name was changed to "Huntsville" to honor pioneer John Hunt.

Both John Hunt and LeRoy Pope were Freemasons and charter members of Helion Lodge #1, the oldest lodge in Alabama.

In 1811, Huntsville became the first incorporated town in what is now Alabama. However, the recognized "founding" year of the city is 1805, the year of John Hunt's arrival. David Wade settled in Huntsville in 1817. He built the David Wade House on the north side of what is now Bob Wade Lane (Robert B. Wade was David's grandson), just east of Mt. Lebanon Road.

=== Emerging industries ===
Huntsville's initial growth was based on wealth generated by the sale of cotton from plantations, for which there was international demand, and trade associated with railroad industries. Many wealthy planters moved into the area from Virginia, Georgia, and the Carolinas to develop new cotton plantations. The invention of the cotton gin in the late eighteenth century meant that uplands areas could be profitably cultivated with short-staple cotton, which could be grown in a much larger area than the long-staple cotton of the Sea Islands and Low Country. The increased use of cotton meant an increased use of slave labor throughout the South as well.

Like the rest of Alabama, Huntsville was involved in the slave trade. Slaves worked in factories and on cotton plantations. Many cotton mills in the area relied on slave labor, most notably the Bell Factory, where slaves ran textile machinery. The factory was known throughout Alabama for its high levels of production. Cotton mills grew Huntsville and the South's economies greatly, becoming 60% of all U.S. exports and connecting Huntsville to major cotton markets in Nashville, Memphis, and New Orleans. An 1822 census showed that out of the 1,300 inhabitants of Huntsville, 448 were slaves, making up 36% of the city's population.

In 1819, Huntsville hosted a constitutional convention in Walker Allen's large cabinet-making shop. The 44 delegates wrote a constitution for the new state of Alabama. In accordance with the new state constitution, Huntsville became Alabama's first capital when the state was admitted to the Union. This was a temporary designation for one legislative session only. The capital was moved to more central cities in the state; to Cahaba, then to Tuscaloosa, and finally to Montgomery.

In 1855, the Memphis and Charleston Railroad was constructed through Huntsville, becoming the first railway to link the Atlantic seacoast with the lower Mississippi River.

=== Civil War ===
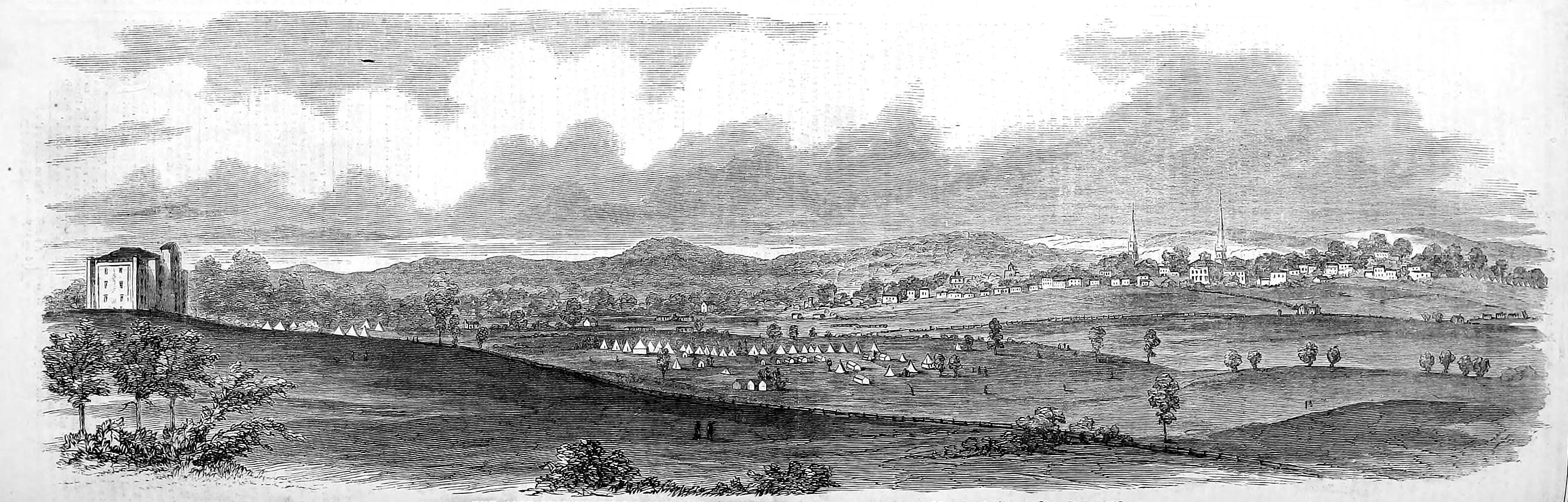
A Union officer of General Mitchell's army sketched Huntsville during the 1862 occupation

Huntsville initially opposed secession from the Union in 1861, but provided many men for the Confederacy's efforts. The 4th Alabama Infantry Regiment, led by Col. Egbert J. Jones of Huntsville, distinguished itself at the Battle of Manassas/Bull Run, the first major encounter of the American Civil War. The regiment, which contained two Huntsville companies, were the first Alabama troops to fight in the war. They were also present when General Robert E. Lee surrendered to Grant at Appomattox Court House in April 1865. Nine generals of the war were born in or near Huntsville; five fought for the Confederacy and four for the Union. Other Huntsville residents joined the Union Army and helped establish the Union Army's 1st Alabama Cavalry Regiment.

On the morning of April 11, 1862, Union troops led by General Ormsby M. Mitchel seized Huntsville in order to sever the Confederacy's rail communications and gain access to the Memphis & Charleston Railroad. Huntsville was the headquarters for the Eastern Division of the Memphis & Charleston.

During the first occupation, Union officers took over many of the larger homes in the city while the enlisted soldiers camped in tents mainly on the outskirts. Union troops searched for Confederate troops hiding in the town and weapons. There was not much resistance, and they treated Huntsville residents in a relatively civil manner. However, residents of nearby towns reported harsher treatment. Union troops were forced to retreat a few months later. In the fall of 1863, they returned to Huntsville, using it as a base of operations for the war in the South until the last months of 1864. According to the journal of a nearby resident, Union troops burned many homes and villages in the surrounding countryside in retaliation for the active guerrilla warfare in the area. Many houses and buildings were burned, although most of Huntsville was kept intact as it housed both Union officers and troops.

=== After the Civil War ===
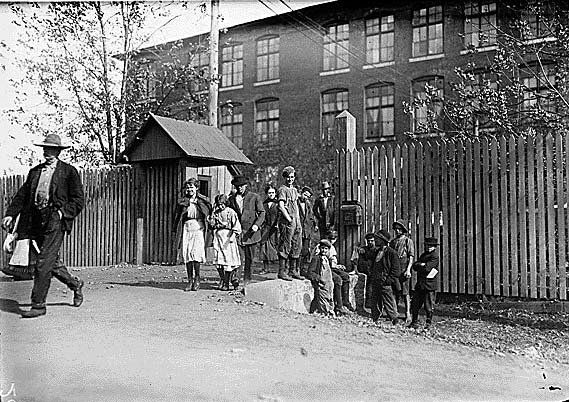
Child workers at Merrimac Mills in Huntsville, November 1910, photograph by Lewis Hine

During the Reconstruction era, three delegates from Huntsville attended the 1867 Constitutional Convention including Andrew J. Applegate, originally from Ohio, who went on to serve as Alabama's first Lieutenant Governor. Councill Training School, which eventually became William Hooper Councill High School, was established as the first public school for African American students. It was named for educator and school founder William Hooper Councill.

Huntsville became a center for cotton textile mills, such as Lincoln, Dallas, and Merrimack. Each mill company constructed worker housing outside the city, creating communities that eventually included schools, churches, grocery stores, theaters, and hardware stores, all within walking distance of the mill. In many such company towns, workers were required to buy goods at the company stores, which sometimes overcharged them. The mill owners also established rules for behavior and could throw out workers from housing if they violated these policies. As was common for the time, work was highly segregated with only whites being allowed to work inside the mills and Blacks relegated to working outside as laborers and groundskeepers.

During the 1930s, industry declined in Huntsville due to the Great Depression. Huntsville became known as the Watercress Capital of the World because of its abundant harvest in the area. Madison County led Alabama in cotton production during this time.

=== Military and NASA involvement ===
By 1940, Huntsville was still relatively small, with a population of about 13,000 inhabitants. This quickly changed in early 1941 when the U.S. Army selected 35,000 acres (140 km^{2}) of land adjoining the southwest area of the city for building three chemical munitions facilities: the Huntsville Arsenal, the Redstone Ordnance Plant (soon redesignated Redstone Arsenal), and the Gulf Chemical Warfare Depot. These operated throughout World War II, with combined personnel approaching 20,000. Resources in the area were strained as new workers flocked to the area, and the construction of housing could not keep up.

At the end of the war in 1945, the munitions facilities were no longer needed. They were combined with the designation Redstone Arsenal (RSA), and a considerable political and business effort was made in attempts to attract new tenants. One significant start involved manufacturing the Keller automobile, but this closed after 18 vehicles were built. With the encouragement of US Senator John Sparkman (D-AL), the U.S. Army Air Force considered this for a major testing facility, but selected another site. Redstone Arsenal was prepared for disposal, but Sparkman used his considerable Southern Democratic influence (the Solid South controlled numerous powerful chairmanships of congressional committees) to persuade the Army to choose it as a site for rocket and missile development.

As the Korean War started, the Ordnance Guided Missile Center (OGMC) was given the mission to develop what eventually became the Redstone Rocket. This rocket set the stage for the United States' space program, as well as major Army missile programs, to be centered in Huntsville. Brigadier General Holger Toftoy commanded OGMC and the overall Redstone Arsenal. In early 1956, the Army Ballistic Missile Agency (ABMA) under Major General John Medaris was formed.

In 1950, about 1,000 personnel were transferred from Fort Bliss, Texas, to Redstone Arsenal to form the Ordnance Guided Missile Center (OGMC). Central to this was a group of about 200 German scientists and engineers, led by Wernher von Braun; they had been brought from Nazi Germany to the United States by Colonel Holger Toftoy under Operation Paperclip following World War II. Assigned to the center at Huntsville, they settled and raised families.

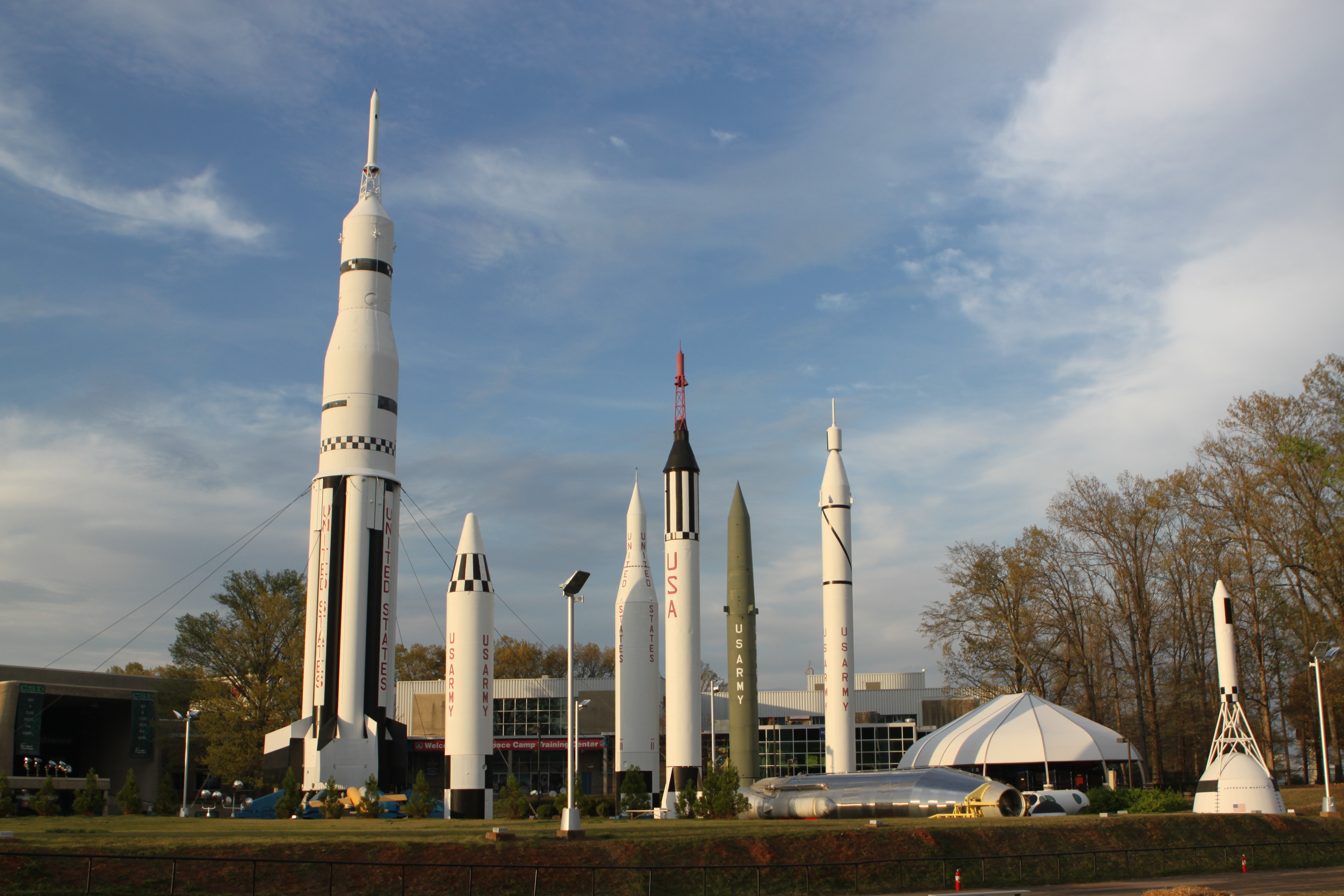
Historic rockets in Rocket Park of the U.S. Space & Rocket Center, Huntsville, Alabama

The city is nicknamed "The Rocket City" for its close association with U.S. space missions. On January 31, 1958, ABMA placed America's first satellite, Explorer 1, into orbit using a Jupiter-C launch vehicle, a descendant of the Redstone. This brought national attention to Redstone Arsenal and Huntsville, with widespread recognition of this being a major center for high technology.

On July 1, 1960, 4,670 civilian employees, associated buildings and equipment, and 1,840 acres (7.4 km^{2}) of land were transferred from ABMA to form NASA's George C. Marshall Space Flight Center (MSFC). Wernher von Braun was MSFC's initial director. On September 8, President Dwight D. Eisenhower formally dedicated the MSFC.

During the 1960s, the major mission of MSFC was in developing the Saturn boosters used by NASA in the Apollo Lunar Landing Program. For this, MSFC greatly increased its employees, and many new companies joined the Huntsville industrial community. The Cummings Research Park was developed just north of Redstone Arsenal to partially accommodate this industrial growth, and has now become the second-largest research park of this type in America.

Huntsville was selected as the permanent home of the United States Space Operations Command in 2020, but in 2023 the Pentagon announced that the temporary headquarters would be expanded and remain in Colorado. However, on September 2, 2025, president Donald Trump announced that the headquarters would be moved to Huntsville, because, according to Trump, "they fought harder for it than anybody else".

=== Civil rights movement to modern day ===
Huntsville was a key location in the civil rights movement. In 1962, students from Alabama A&M University held the city's first lunch counter sit-in. After the mayor refused to address the protests, the Community Service Committee (CSC) was formed to help organize sit-ins and protests, as well as bail out arrested protestors. In April 1962, a committee was formed by the city to "address the concerns of the African American community," and eight lunch counters, as well as a number of other public spaces, were desegregated. On May 11, 1962, Huntsville became the first city in Alabama to be racially integrated.

In June 1963, the admission of two Black students to the University of Alabama in Huntsville was challenged by Governor George Wallace. Wallace pushed back the registration dates for multiple state universities (presumably to allow more time for state troopers to move into the area) but instead moved them to Tuscaloosa. The students were admitted without issues. Around the same time, the color barrier was broken further when the first white person enrolled at Alabama A&M University. In August 1963, a court ruling determined that Huntsville must desegregate their schools. Wallace used state troopers to stop four students from entering the first desegregated school. On September 6, the troopers announced that the desegregated schools were closed for three more days, but the Board of Education issued a statement denying the closure. When the schools opened on September 9, Wallace was served a restraining order against further interference with the desegregation of Huntsville schools. Huntsville became the first city in Alabama to desegregate its schools as well.

Alabama's opposition to desegregation at this time caused concern from the NASA Administrator James E. Webb, who investigated equal employment opportunities for Black people in Huntsville. After failing to attract high-level staff to Huntsville, Webb said that "some research work would have to be switched from Huntsville to New Orleans". This investigation into employment caused MSFC to open their engineering education programs to Black students at Alabama A&M and Oakwood College, as well as for local contractors to "work for progress in race relations".

The emergence of the Space Shuttle, the International Space Station, and a wide variety of advanced research in space sciences led to a resurgence in NASA-related activities that has continued into the 21st century. In addition, new Army organizations have emerged at Redstone Arsenal, particularly in the ever-expanding field of missile defense.

== Geography ==
According to the United States Census Bureau, the city has a total area of 225.17 square miles (583.2 km^{2}), of which 223.63 square miles (579.2 km^{2}) is land and 1.54 square miles (4.0 km^{2}), is water as of 2023. According to the City of Huntsville Statistics, the city has a total area of 226.62 square miles (586.9 km^{2}), of which 225.09 square miles (583.0 km^{2}) is land and 1.54 square miles (4.0 km^{2}), is water as of 2024.

Huntsville has grown through recent annexations west into Limestone County by 21.5 square miles, 56 km^{2}, 13,800 acres in the early 2000s, and south into Morgan County with 1.03 square miles (2.7 km^{2}; 660 acres; 270 ha) in 2018. Huntsville also expanded over 1,000 acres (400 hectares) into Marshall County in 2025 near Hobbs Island, making Huntsville the only municipality in Alabama to be located in 4 counties. Huntsville is so large in fact that its easternmost point and westernmost point are 32.1 miles (51.7 km) apart and its northernmost point and southernmost point are 25.67 miles (41.31 km) apart as of September 2025.

Huntsville has the 29th largest land area in the United States for cities with a population over 100,000. Huntsville has borders surrounding both the cities of Madison and Triana. Huntsville also borders the cities of Decatur, Athens, Owens Cross Roads, the town of Mooresville as well as the census-designated places of Moores Mill, Meridianville, Lacey's Spring, and Redstone Arsenal.

Situated in the Tennessee River valley, Huntsville is partially surrounded by several plateaus, large hills, and mountains. These plateaus are associated with the Cumberland Plateau. Monte Sano Mountain (Spanish for "Mountain of Health") is the most notable and is east of the city, along with Round Top (Burritt), Chapman, Huntsville, and Green mountains. Others are Wade Mountain to the north, Rainbow Mountain to the west, and Weeden and Madkin mountains on the Redstone Arsenal property in the south. Brindley Mountain is visible in the south across the Tennessee River.

As with other areas along the Cumberland Plateau, the land around Huntsville is karst in nature. The city was founded around the Big Spring, which is a typical karst spring. Many caves perforate the limestone bedrock underneath the surface, as is common in karst areas. The National Speleological Society is headquartered in Huntsville.

=== Climate ===
Huntsville has a humid subtropical climate (Köppen climate classification Cfa). It experiences hot, humid summers and generally mild winters, with average high temperatures ranging from near 90 °F (32.2 °C) in the summer to 49 °F (9.4 °C) during winter.

Huntsville is near the center of a large area of the U.S. mid-South that has maximum precipitation in the winter and spring, not summer. The average yearly precipitation is more than 54 inches (1,400 millimetres). On average, the wettest single month is December, but Huntsville has a prolonged wetter season from November to May with, on average, nearly or over 5 inches (130 millimetres) of precipitation most of those months. On average, August to October represent slightly drier months, showing less than 3.6 inches or 91 millimetres of precipitation. Droughts can occur, primarily August through October, but usually there is enough rainfall to keep soils moist and vegetation lush. Much of Huntsville's precipitation is delivered by thunderstorms. Thunderstorms are most frequent during the spring, and the most severe storms occur during the spring and late fall. These storms can deliver large hail, damaging straight-line winds, and tornadoes. Huntsville lies in a region colloquially known as Dixie Alley, an area more prone to violent, long-track tornadoes than most other parts of the US.

On April 27, 2011, the largest tornado outbreak on record, the 2011 Super Outbreak, affected northern Alabama. During this event, an EF5 tornado that tracked near the Browns Ferry Nuclear Power Plant destroyed many transmission towers and caused a multi-day power outage for the majority of North Alabama. That same tornado also resulted in considerable damage to the Anderson Hills subdivision and in Harvest, Alabama. In total, nine people were killed in Madison County, and many others were injured. Other significant tornado events include the Super Outbreak in April 1974, the November 1989 tornado that killed 21 and injured over 460, and the 1995 Anderson Hills tornado that killed one person and caused extensive damage. On January 21, 2010, an EF2 tornado struck Huntsville, resulting in moderate damage. Because it was not rain-wrapped and was easily photographed, it received extensive media coverage.

While most winters have some measurable snow, heavy snow is rare in Huntsville. However, there have been some unusually heavy snowstorms, like the New Year's Eve 1963 snowstorm, when 17 inches or 0.43 metres fell within 24 hours. Likewise, the Blizzard of 1993 and the Groundhog Day snowstorm in February 1996 were substantial winter events for Huntsville. On Christmas Day 2010, Huntsville recorded over 4 inches or 0.10 metres of snow, and on January 9–10, 2011 it received 8.9 inches or 0.23 metres at the airport and up to 10 inches or 0.25 metres in the suburbs.

Climate data for Huntsville, Alabama (Huntsville International Airport), 1991–2020 normals, (Note: Mean monthly maxima and minima (i.e. the expected highest and lowest temperature readings at any point during the year or given month) calculated based on data at said location from 1991 to 2020.) extremes 1907–present
Month	Jan	Feb	Mar	Apr	May	Jun	Jul	Aug	Sep	Oct	Nov	Dec	Year
Record high °F (°C)	82 (28)	83 (28)	90 (32)	95 (35)	99 (37)	108 (42)	111 (44)	108 (42)	108 (42)	100 (38)	88 (31)	81 (27)	111 (44)
Mean maximum °F (°C)	69.3 (20.7)	73.6 (23.1)	80.7 (27.1)	86.0 (30.0)	91.2 (32.9)	95.6 (35.3)	97.2 (36.2)	97.3 (36.3)	94.1 (34.5)	87.1 (30.6)	78.6 (25.9)	70.9 (21.6)	99.2 (37.3)
Mean daily maximum °F (°C)	52.3 (11.3)	57.1 (13.9)	65.5 (18.6)	74.8 (23.8)	82.5 (28.1)	89.1 (31.7)	91.5 (33.1)	91.3 (32.9)	86.5 (30.3)	76.0 (24.4)	63.9 (17.7)	55.0 (12.8)	73.8 (23.2)
Daily mean °F (°C)	42.7 (5.9)	46.7 (8.2)	54.2 (12.3)	62.9 (17.2)	71.3 (21.8)	78.6 (25.9)	81.3 (27.4)	80.5 (26.9)	74.9 (23.8)	63.9 (17.7)	52.5 (11.4)	45.5 (7.5)	62.9 (17.2)
Mean daily minimum °F (°C)	33.1 (0.6)	36.4 (2.4)	43.0 (6.1)	51.0 (10.6)	60.2 (15.7)	68.0 (20.0)	71.1 (21.7)	69.7 (20.9)	63.4 (17.4)	51.8 (11.0)	41.2 (5.1)	35.9 (2.2)	52.1 (11.2)
Mean minimum °F (°C)	13.9 (−10.1)	18.8 (−7.3)	24.7 (−4.1)	34.2 (1.2)	45.0 (7.2)	56.7 (13.7)	62.8 (17.1)	60.2 (15.7)	48.0 (8.9)	34.3 (1.3)	24.5 (−4.2)	20.0 (−6.7)	11.7 (−11.3)
Record low °F (°C)	−11 (−24)	−8 (−22)	6 (−14)	24 (−4)	32 (0)	42 (6)	49 (9)	50 (10)	37 (3)	23 (−5)	1 (−17)	−3 (−19)	−11 (−24)
Average precipitation inches (mm)	4.99 (127)	5.11 (130)	5.39 (137)	4.86 (123)	4.67 (119)	4.06 (103)	4.49 (114)	3.55 (90)	3.49 (89)	3.56 (90)	4.25 (108)	5.87 (149)	54.29 (1,379)
Average snowfall inches (cm)	0.7 (1.8)	1.0 (2.5)	0.5 (1.3)	0.0 (0.0)	0.0 (0.0)	0.0 (0.0)	0.0 (0.0)	0.0 (0.0)	0.0 (0.0)	0.0 (0.0)	0.0 (0.0)	0.2 (0.51)	2.4 (6.1)
Average precipitation days (≥ 0.01 in)	10.6	11.3	11.2	10.1	10.0	10.1	10.8	9.2	6.8	7.7	8.8	11.0	117.6
Average snowy days (≥ 0.1 in)	0.8	0.6	0.3	0.0	0.0	0.0	0.0	0.0	0.0	0.0	0.0	0.3	2.0
Average relative humidity (%)	72.0	68.5	65.3	63.1	69.0	70.5	74.0	73.9	73.9	70.1	70.9	72.2	70.3
Source 1: NOAA
Source 2: World Meteorological Organization (relative humidity 1961–1990)

== Demographics ==
Historical population
Census	Pop.	Note	%±
1840	2,496		—
1850	2,863		14.7%
1860	3,634		26.9%
1870	4,907		35.0%
1880	4,977		1.4%
1890	7,995		60.6%
1900	8,068		0.9%
1910	7,611		−5.7%
1920	8,018		5.3%
1930	11,554		44.1%
1940	13,050		12.9%
1950	16,437		26.0%
1960	72,365		340.3%
1970	139,282		92.5%
1980	142,513		2.3%
1990	159,789		12.1%
2000	158,216		−1.0%
2010	180,105		13.8%
2020	215,006		19.4%
2025 (est.)	233,627	▲	8.7%
U.S. Decennial Census; 2020 Census

=== Racial and ethnic composition ===
Huntsville city, Alabama – Racial and ethnic composition Note: the US Census treats Hispanic/Latino as an ethnic category. This table excludes Latinos from the racial categories and assigns them to a separate category. Hispanics/Latinos may be of any race.
Race / Ethnicity (NH = Non-Hispanic)	Pop 1980	Pop 1990	Pop 2000	Pop 2010	Pop 2020	% 1980	% 1990	% 2000	% 2010	% 2020
White alone (NH)	110,138	114,799	100,333	104,516	118,616	77.28%	71.84%	63.42%	58.03%	55.17%
Black or African American alone (NH)	29,162	38,801	47,453	55,615	62,360	20.46%	24.28%	29.99%	30.88%	29.00%
Native American or Alaska Native alone (NH)	362	787	830	940	854	0.25%	0.49%	0.52%	0.52%	0.40%
Asian alone (NH)	1,167	3,366	3,499	4,287	5,399	0.82%	2.11%	2.21%	2.38%	2.51%
Native Hawaiian or Pacific Islander alone (NH)	x	x	79	194	265	x	x	0.05%	0.11%	0.12%
Other race alone (NH)	244	57	173	260	878	0.17%	0.04%	0.11%	0.14%	0.41%
Mixed race or Multiracial (NH)	x	x	2,624	3,781	9,965	x	x	1.66%	2.10%	4.63%
Hispanic or Latino (any race)	1,440	1,979	3,225	10,512	16,669	1.01%	1.24%	2.04%	5.84%	7.75%
Total	142,513	159,789	158,216	180,105	215,006	100.00%	100.00%	100.00%	100.00%	100.00%

=== 2020 census ===
As of the 2020 census, Huntsville had a population of 215,006. The population density was 985.7 inhabitants per square mile (380.6/km^{2}).

There were 92,074 households, including 52,924 families. The median age was 36.9 years. 19.9% of residents were under the age of 18 and 16.3% of residents were 65 years of age or older. For every 100 females there were 94.0 males, and for every 100 females age 18 and over there were 92.0 males age 18 and over.

96.4% of residents lived in urban areas, while 3.6% lived in rural areas.

Of all households, 25.0% had children under the age of 18 living in them. 38.9% were married-couple households, 22.7% were households with a male householder and no spouse or partner present, and 32.7% were households with a female householder and no spouse or partner present. About 35.8% of all households were made up of individuals and 11.4% had someone living alone who was 65 years of age or older.

There were 100,391 housing units, of which 8.3% were vacant. The homeowner vacancy rate was 1.5% and the rental vacancy rate was 8.0%.

== Economy ==
Huntsville's main economic influence is derived from aerospace and military technology. Redstone Arsenal, Cummings Research Park (CRP), Jetplex Industrial Park, and NASA's Marshall Space Flight Center comprise the main hubs for the area's technology-driven economy. CRP is the second largest research park in the United States and the fourth largest in the world. The University of Alabama in Huntsville is a center for technology and engineering research in the area. There are commercial technology companies such as the network access company ADTRAN, computer graphics company Intergraph and designer and manufacturer of IT infrastructure Avocent. Sanmina-SCI has a presence in the area. A number of Fortune 500 companies have operations in Huntsville.

There are several strip malls and shopping malls throughout the city. Huntsville has one enclosed mall, Parkway Place, built in 2002 on the site of the former Parkway City Mall. A larger mall built in 1984, Madison Square Mall, was closed in 2017. The site has since been redeveloped into the mixed use MidCity district. A lifestyle center, Bridge Street Town Centre, was completed in 2007, in Cummings Research Park.

Huntsville is a key city in rocket-propulsion research for NASA and various organizations run by the Army. The Marshall Space Flight Center has been designated to develop NASA's Space Launch System (SLS), and the U.S. Army Aviation and Missile Command (AMCOM) is responsible for developing a variety of rocket-based tactical weapons.

Toyota Motor Manufacturing Alabama was constructed in 2003 and is located in North Huntsville Industrial Park. The plant has 1,800 employees as of 2022. The plant manufactures engines for Toyota vehicles. Navistar Huntsville Powertrain Manufacturing Plant was opened in 2008 and provides powertrain components to Navistar's vehicle assembly plants in Springfield, Ohio and Escobedo, Mexico. The plant is located north of Huntsville International Airport. Mazda Toyota Manufacturing USA was constructed in 2021 with a plan to hire 4,000 employees. The facility produces Toyota and Mazda SUVs and pickup trucks. such as the Toyota Corolla Cross and Mazda CX-50. The majority of the plant is located in Huntsville with the southern third located in the unincorporated community of Greenbrier.

More than 25 biotechnology firms have developed in Huntsville due to the Huntsville Biotech Initiative. The HudsonAlpha Institute for Biotechnology is part of the 4,000 acres (1,600 ha) Cummings Research Park. The non-profit HudsonAlpha Institute has contributed genomics and genetics work to the Encyclopedia of DNA Elements (ENCODE). For-profit business ventures within the Biotech Campus focus on subjects such as diagnosing disease, immune responses to cancer, protein crystallization, lab-on-a-chip technologies, and agricultural technologies. The University of Alabama in Huntsville (UAH) created a doctoral program in biotechnology to help develop scientists to support HudsonAlpha in addition to the emerging biotechnology economy in Huntsville.

In 2018, Meta broke ground on a $1.5 billion data center in North Huntsville Industrial Park, and was opened in 2021. In June 2022, they announced they would be expanding the facility to seven buildings across a 3.5 million square foot area, but paused construction in December. The company advertised that the facility runs on 100% renewable energy and provides 300+ jobs to the community.

In 2025, President Donald Trump announced that the headquarters of the United States Space Command would move to Huntsville from Colorado Springs, Colorado.

== Arts and culture ==
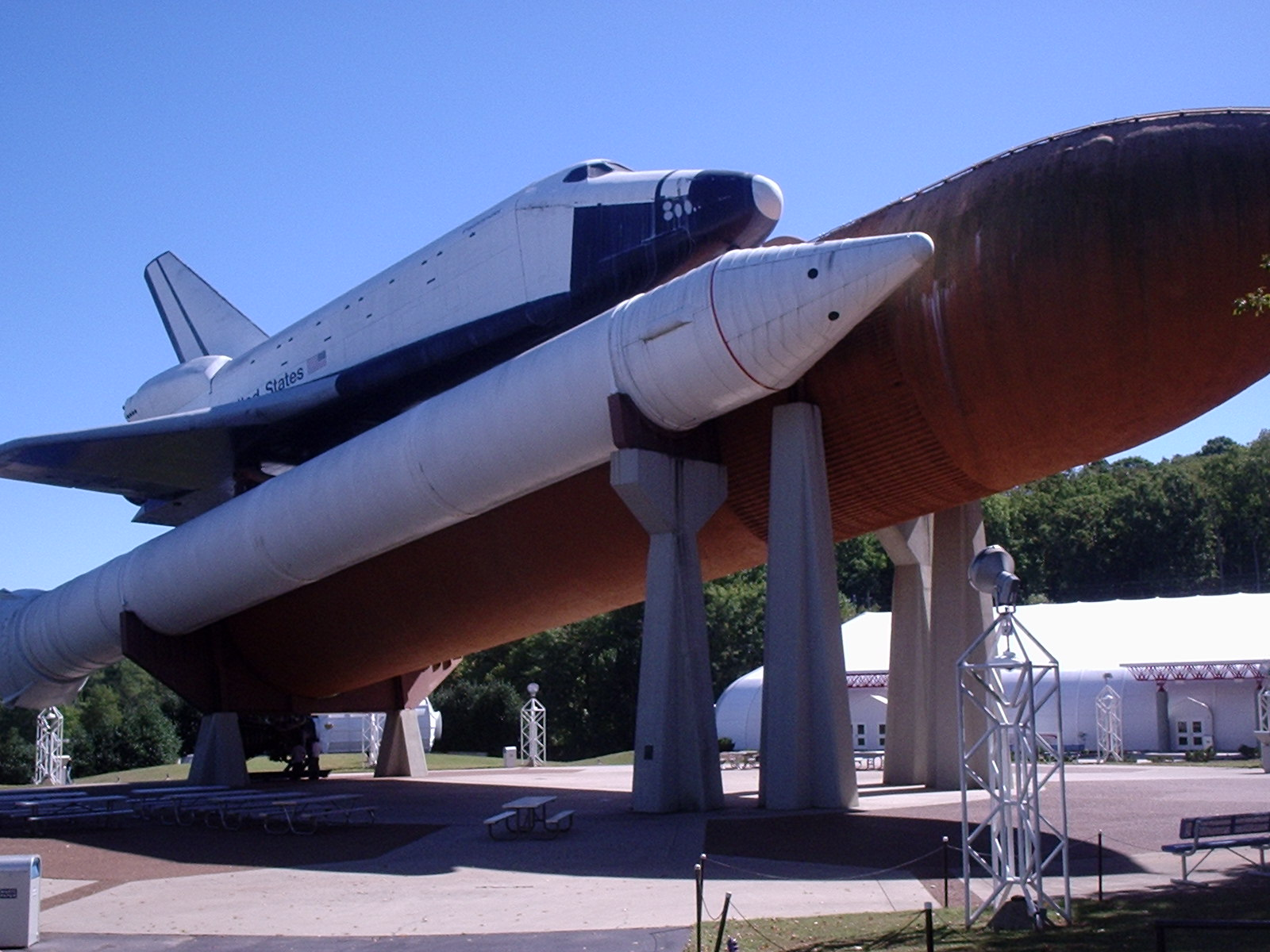
Space Shuttle Pathfinder at the United States Space & Rocket Center

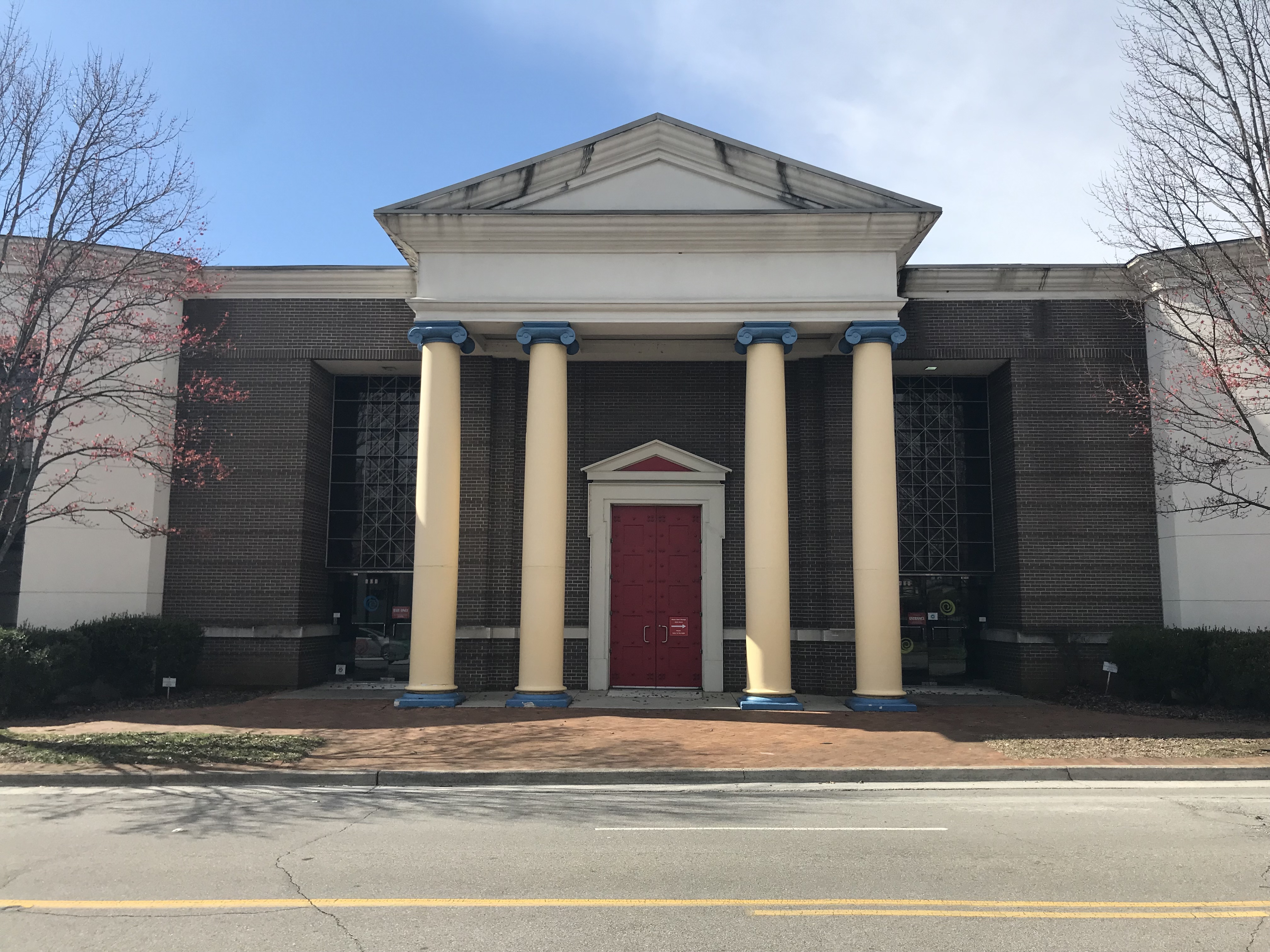
EarlyWorks Children's Museum

=== Historic districts and museums ===
Twickenham Historic District was chosen as the name of the first of three of the city's historic districts. It features homes in the Federal and Greek Revival architectural styles introduced to the city by Virginia-born architect George Steele about 1818. The 1819 Weeden House Museum was home to female artist and poet Howard Weeden, whose watercolors include portraits of African Americans. Old Town Historic District contains a variety of styles, with homes dating from the late 1820s through the early 1900s. Lowe Mill Village and Lincoln Mill and Mill Village Historic District were established during the textile boom of the 1890s and were recognized for their historical importance in 2011, along with Dallas Mill Village.

EarlyWorks Family of Museums runs multiple museums in Huntsville. EarlyWorks Children's Museum is an interactive history museum. Alabama Constitution Village features eight reconstructed Federal style buildings, with living-museum displays downtown. The Huntsville Depot, completed in 1860, is the oldest extant railroad depot in Alabama and one of the oldest extant depots in the United States.

Burritt on the Mountain, located on Monte Sano Mountain, is a regional history museum and event venue featuring a 1950s mansion, interpretive historic park, nature trails, and scenic overlooks. Harrison Brothers Hardware Store, established in 1879, is the oldest operating hardware store in Alabama. Now owned by the Historic Huntsville Foundation, it is still a working store and museum. Huntsville Museum of Art in Big Spring International Park offers permanent displays, traveling exhibitions, and educational programs. North Alabama Railroad Museum features locomotives, coach cars, and other train cars.

The United States Space & Rocket Center features the United States Space Camp, Aviation Challenge, and the only Saturn V rocket designated a National Historic Landmark. The U.S. Veterans Memorial Museum displays more than 30 military vehicles from World War I to the present, including the world's oldest jeep, artifacts, and small arms dating back to the Revolutionary War.

=== Libraries ===
Branches of the Huntsville-Madison County Public Library include: South Huntsville Public Library, North Huntsville Public Library, Downtown Huntsville Public Library, Cavalry Hill Public Library, Gurley Public Library, Madison Public Library, Monrovia Public Library, New Hope Public Library, Tillman D. Hill Public Library of Hazel Green, and Triana Public Library. The Huntsville-Madison County Public Library has Alabama's highest materials circulation rate, and features a historical resource archive.

=== Visual arts and festivals ===
Arts Huntsville, established as The Arts Council (TAC), includes over 100 local arts organizations and advocates, and promotes visual arts with two galleries: art@TAC, and JavaGalleria. TAC supports Create Huntsville, a county initiative to expand arts and cultural opportunities.

The Huntsville Museum of Art opened in 1970. It purchased the largest privately owned, permanent collection of art by American women in the U.S., featuring Anna Elizabeth Klumpke, among others. The Huntsville Photographic Society started in 1956, dedicated to furthering the art and science of photography in North Alabama. The Huntsville Art League started in 1957, adopting the name "The Huntsville Art League and Museum Association" (HALMA). In addition to their Visiting Artists and "Limelight Artists" series, which highlight both nonresident and member artists at the home office, HALMA features its members' works at galleries located in the Jane Grote Roberts Auditorium of the Huntsville-Madison County Public Library Main Branch, the Heritage Club, and the halls of the Huntsville Times.

Panoply Arts Festival occurs every spring, and includes demonstrations, performances, competitions, workshops, and fireworks. The Cigar Box Guitar Festival occurs each June, and is the world's longest running Cigar Box Guitar festival, featuring live music using home made instruments. The Galaxy of Lights is a holiday-themed light showcase hosted by the Huntsville Botanical Garden each winter. The Botanical Garden hosts a fun-run through the event.

=== Performing arts ===
The Huntsville Community Chorus Association (HCCA) is one of Alabama's oldest performing arts organizations, with its first performance dating to December 1946. HCCA produces chorale concerts and musical theater productions. The Huntsville Symphony Orchestra (HSO) is Alabama's oldest continuously operating professional symphony orchestra, featuring performances of classical, pops and family concerts, and music education programs in public schools. The Huntsville Youth Orchestra was founded by Russell Gerhart, founding conductor of the Huntsville Symphony Orchestra, in 1961. Huntsville Chamber Music Guild was organized in 1952 to promote and present chamber music programs; the group seeks to present recitals in which artists are presented in works of the classical masters.

Broadway Theatre League was founded in 1959. BTL presents a season of national touring Broadway productions each year, a family-fun show, and additional season specials. Shows are presented in the Von Braun Center's Mark C. Smith Concert Hall.

Fantasy Playhouse Children's Theatre, Huntsville's oldest children's theater, was founded in 1961. Fantasy Playhouse Theater Academy, the organization's dance, music, and art school, teaches children and adults each year. Fantasy Playhouse regularly produces three plays a year with an additional play, A Christmas Carol, produced early each December. Independent Musical Productions (IMP), was founded in 1993 and stages musical productions performed by volunteers from the community. Three musicals are presented throughout the year, as well as several Cabaret performances at smaller local venues to round out each season. IMP is a 501(c)(3) non-profit organization and offers technical and performance workshops for the community.

The Von Braun Center, which originally opened in 1975 as the Von Braun Civic Center, includes 10,000-seat capacity arena, a 2,000-seat concert hall, a 500-seat playhouse (330 seats with proscenium staging), and 150,000 square feet (14,000 m^{2}) of convention space. Both the arena and concert hall have undergone major renovations; as a result, they have been rechristened the Propst Arena and the Mark C. Smith Concert Hall, respectively.

=== Breweries ===
A number of local breweries are located in Huntsville. Straight to Ale Brewery opened in 2010 in North Huntsville, later relocated to South Huntsville, and then moved to Campus 805 in West Huntsville. Yellowhammer Brewing opened in 2010 in West Huntsville. It later moved to a new facility at Campus 805 in West Huntsville. Salty Nut Brewery opened in 2013 in North Huntsville and moved to West Huntsville on brewery row. Green Bus Brewing in downtown Huntsville opened in late 2015.

== Sports ==
Huntsville is home to a number of adult sports teams and leagues. The Huntsville Havoc are a professional ice hockey team with the SPHL that play home games at the Von Braun Center. Huntsville City FC, a reserve team for Nashville SC of Major League Soccer, began playing in 2023 in MLS Next Pro, the third level of soccer in the US. The Huntsville Adult Soccer League, based at Merrimack Sports Complex, is an amateur adult soccer league with seven teams, including four men's divisions, a premier team, a women's team, and a master's team. The Rocket City Roller Derby is part of the Women's Flat Track Derby Association (WFTDA) and plays at the NSS Conference Center. The Alabama–Huntsville Chargers (University of Alabama in Huntsville) Men's and Women's Basketball teams are part of NCAA D-II and play at Spragins Hall. The Alabama A&M Bulldogs (Alabama A&M University) Men's Football team is part of NCAA D-I FCS.

Huntsville has numerous sports venues. The Von Braun Center has a maximum seating capacity of 9,000. Toyota Field is a baseball park with a capacity of about 7,000 in nearby Madison that is home to the AA-minor league Rocket City Trash Pandas team. A former baseball park, Joe Davis Stadium, was converted into a 6,000-seat soccer-specific stadium in 2023 for Huntsville City FC. The soccer field was named the Wicks Family Field to honor and recognize the Wicks family's contributions. A number of smaller stadiums are used by universities or public schools, including Louis Crews Stadium with a capacity of 21,000, and Milton Frank Stadium with a capacity of 12,000. The Merrimack Soccer Complex has 14 soccer fields used by youth soccer organizations. The Huntsville Speedway is a quarter mile oval race track used for race days and other events.

Huntsville has had many professional sports teams in its past, most of which were discontinued due to lack of funding or being transferred to a different city. Huntsville's first sports team was the Huntsville Rockets football team, launched in 1962 and folded in 1967 due to lack of funding. The Alabama Hawks were a football team founded in 1963 and were discontinued in 1969 due to lack of funding. The Huntsville Stars were a Minor League Baseball team founded in 1985, originally as the Nashville Sounds in Nashville, Tennessee, but were transferred to Huntsville soon after. In 2014, they were transferred to Biloxi, Mississippi and renamed the Biloxi Shuckers. The Huntsville Blast were a minor league ice hockey team, originally founded in 1981 as the Roanoke Valley Rampage in Vinton, Virginia, and were relocated to Huntsville in 1993. The following season, the team was relocated to Tallahassee, Florida as the Tallahassee Tiger Sharks. The Huntsville Fire were an indoor soccer team founded in 1997 and dissolved in 1998 due to lack of funding. The Huntsville Channel Cats were an ice hockey team founded in 1995 and renamed the Huntsville Havoc in 2004. The Huntsville Flight were a basketball team founded in 2001 and were moved to Albuquerque, New Mexico in 2005. Today, they are the Cleveland Charge. The Tennessee Valley Raptors were an indoor football team established in 2000 and relocated to Rockford, Illinois in 2005. The Alabama Hammers, which played at the Von Braun Center, were an indoor football team established in 2010 and folded in 2016 due to the collapse of the league.

== Parks and recreation ==
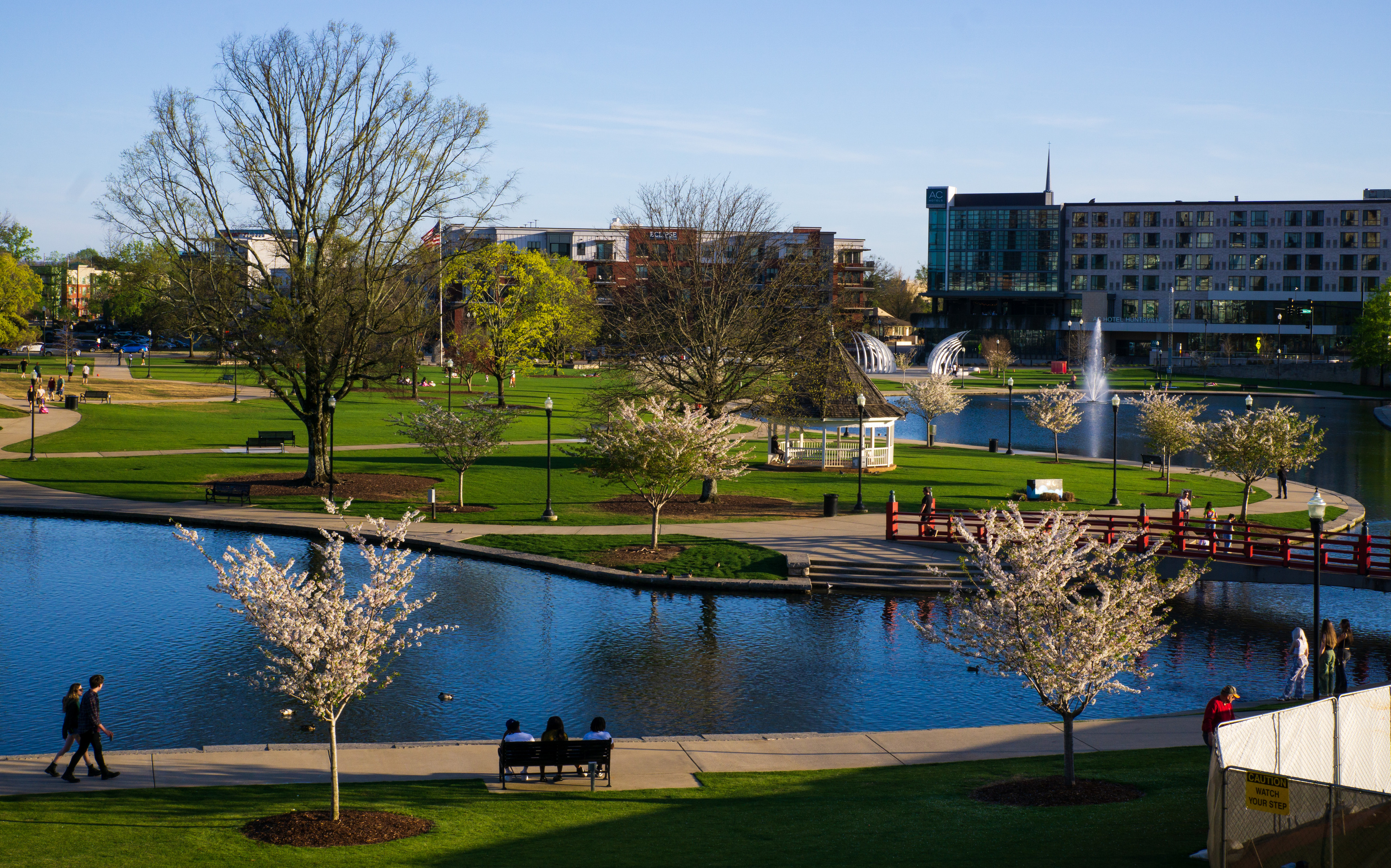
Big Spring International Park, 2023

There are more than 60 parks within the city limits of Huntsville. In 2013, for the fifth time in seven years, Huntsville was named a 'Playful City USA' by KaBOOM! for their efforts to provide a variety of play opportunities for children that included after school programs and parks within walking distance of home.

Centered on the natural Big Spring in downtown Huntsville is Big Spring International Park, containing the Huntsville Museum of Art. Fish and ducks live in the spring and in surrounding water bodies. There is a waterfall and a constantly lit gas torch. John Hunt Park is the city's largest park, with 428 acres (173 ha) of open space, tennis courts, soccer fields, and walking trails, as well as facilities near the sports fields.

Burritt on the Mountain atop Monte Sano Mountain features a mid-century mansion and museum, a historic park depicting rural life in the 19th century, nature trails, and functions as a venue for regional events throughout the year. The Huntsville Botanical Garden's 112 acres (45 ha) site features educational programs, woodland paths, grassy meadows, and vast floral collections.

Land Trust of North Alabama is a member supported, non-profit organization dedicated to the conservation of the natural heritage of the area. They work to preserve open space, wildflower areas, wetlands, and working farms in North Alabama, including some of the Monte Sano Nature Preserve (Monte Sano Mountain). Monte Sano State Park has over 2,000 acres (8.1 km^{2}) and features hiking and bicycling trails, rentable cabins, campsites, full RV hookups, and a lodge. Other state parks nearby include Cathedral Caverns in Woodville, Lake Guntersville State Park in Guntersville, and Joe Wheeler State Park in Rogersville.

There are six main golf courses in Huntsville. Hampton Cove is one of the eleven courses making up the Robert Trent Jones Golf Trail, featuring two championship 18-hole courses, one par-three course, and a driving range. Sunset Landing Golf Course is an 18-hole golf course next to Huntsville International Airport. The Links on Redstone Arsenal is available for Military, NASA, and others that have base access. The Links has four separate 9-hole courses (two of which can be used for footgolf) and a driving range. The Ledges is an exclusive 18-hole championship golf course, also offering a banquet hall, grand hall, and a number of meeting rooms at their clubhouse.

== Government ==
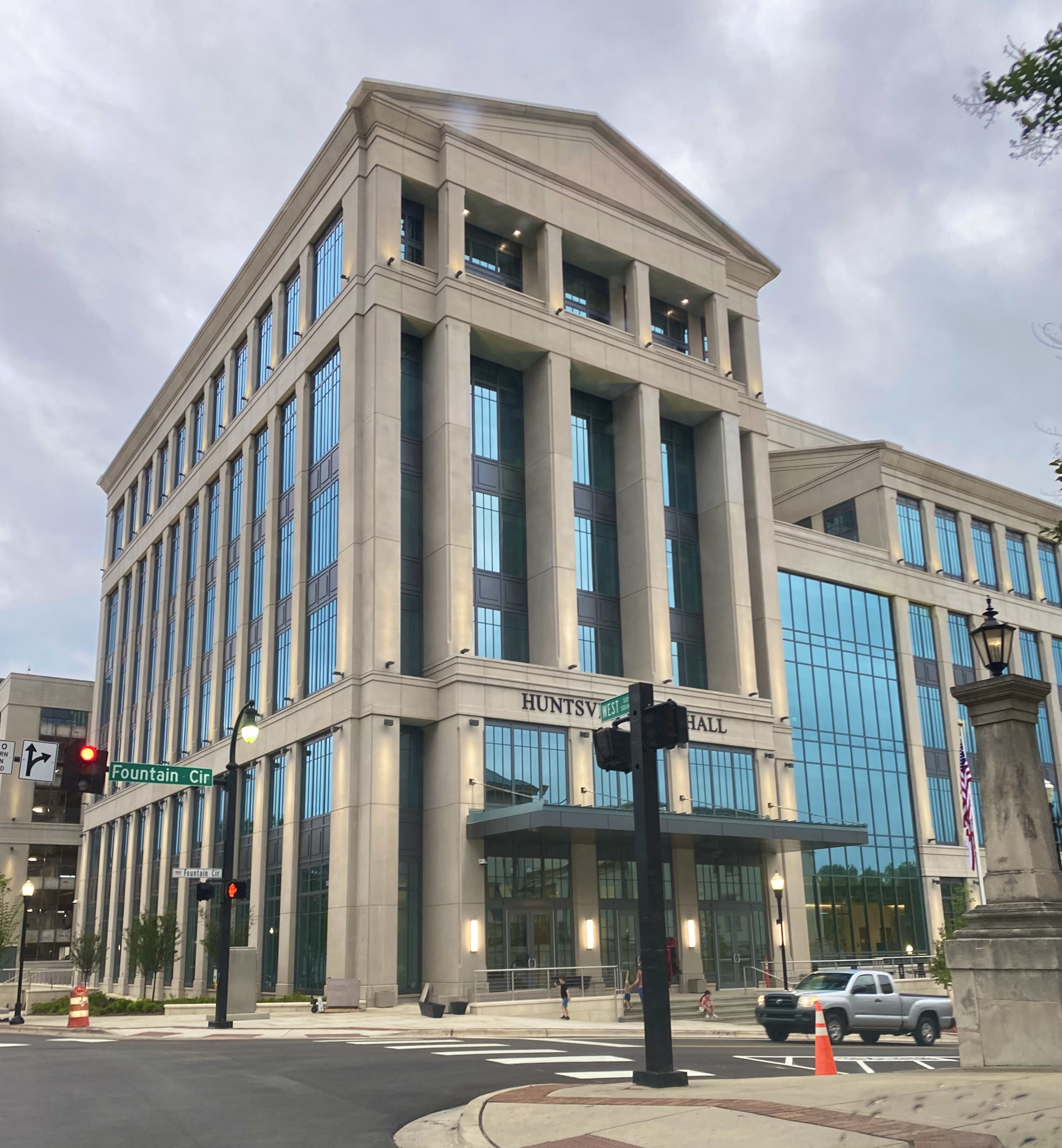
Huntsville City Hall

The current mayor of Huntsville is Tommy Battle, who was first elected in 2008 and then re-elected in 2012, 2016, and 2020. The City Administrator is John Hamilton, who replaced Rex Reynolds on January 1, 2014, when Reynolds retired.

The city has a five-member (1 per district) City Council. Council elections are staggered, meaning that Districts 2, 3, and 4 had elections in August 2018, while Districts 1 and 5 had elections simultaneously with mayoral elections in 2020. The city has boards and commissions which control most public services and development projects. In 2020, the city announced that they would build a new $80 million city hall, planned to centralize all boards and committees in one building.

In July 2007, then Senator Barack Obama held the first fundraiser in Alabama for his presidential campaign in Huntsville. In 2022, former Rep. Mo Brooks (R-5th Congressional District, AL) announced his retirement from the U.S. House of Representatives to run for the Senate. In November, Dale Strong won the election to replace Mo Brooks.

== Education ==
=== K–12 education ===
K–12 public education in Huntsville is provided by Huntsville City Schools. In the 2022–2023 school year 23,939 students attended Huntsville City Schools. According to U.S. News & World Report, "49% of high school students tested at or above the proficient level for reading, and 45% tested at or above that level for math". They also stated that high schoolers have a 92% graduation rate.

Of the 46 schools in the Huntsville City Schools system in 2020–2021, there were:

- 26 Preschools (Pre-K)
- 28 Elementary schools (K–5)
- 14 Middle schools (grades 6–8)
- 6 high Schools (grades 9–12)
- 3 special centers (two Schools of Choice and one Program of Choice)

Huntsville City Schools also offers six magnet programs at existing schools: three programs for grades 9–12, two for 6–8, and one for both.

The section in Morgan County is within the Morgan County School District. A few parcels of Huntsville in Madison County are in the Madison County School District, and a few parcels in Limestone County are in the Limestone County School District.

Several private, parochial, and religious schools serve grades pre-K–12. The city has several private Christian schools, including Saint John Paul II Catholic High School, Oakwood Adventist Academy, Whitesburg Christian Academy, Grace Lutheran School, and Westminster Christian Academy. Randolph School is Huntsville's only independent, private K-12 school.

=== Higher education ===
Huntsville has four main higher education institutions. The University of Alabama in Huntsville is the largest university serving the greater Huntsville area, with 9,636 undergraduate students in 2022–2023. About half of its graduates earn a degree in engineering or science, making it one of the larger producers of engineers and physical scientists in Alabama. The Carnegie Foundation ranks the school very highly as a research institution, placing it among the top 75 public research universities in the nation. Alabama A&M University is the oldest university in the Huntsville area, dating to 1875. With over 5,000 students, it is home to the AAMU Historic District with 28 buildings and four structures listed in the United States National Register of Historic Places. Oakwood University, founded in 1896, is a Seventh-day Adventist university with over 1,300 students and a member institution of the United Negro College Fund. J.F. Drake State Community and Technical College, founded in 1961, is a public technical college with 872 students as of 2022.

Various colleges and universities have satellite locations or extensions in Huntsville. Calhoun Community College's Cummings Research Park location offers in-person technical and medical programs. Columbia College's Redstone Arsenal location and Embry-Riddle Aeronautical University's Redstone Arsenal location offer higher education programs in-person and online to military individuals and their families. Faulkner University's Research Park location and Strayer University's Research Park offers in-person and online learning. Georgia Institute of Technology's Redstone Arsenal research institute is the "Development and technology home for Army Air Defense Systems, Missile Defense Systems, Rotary Wing Aviation Technology and more..." and offers professional training in those areas.

Several medical centers and universities with medical programs offer education in medicine. University of Alabama at Birmingham's Huntsville Regional Medical Campus offers a number of on-site programs, including the Family Medicine Residency, Internal Medicine Residency, Obstetrics and Women's Health Fellowship. The campus also serves as a physician practice for the public. Ross Medical Education Center in Research Park offer 36-week experience programs in medicine, dentistry, and veterinary medicine fields. Huntsville Hospital has an accredited school of radiology.

== Media ==
=== Newspapers and magazines ===
The Huntsville Times has been Huntsville's only daily newspaper since 1996, when the Huntsville News closed. Before then, the News was the morning paper, and the Times was the afternoon paper until 2004. The Times has a weekday circulation of 60,000, which rises to 80,000 on Sundays. Both papers were owned by the Newhouse chain.

In May 2012, Advance Publications, owner of the Times, announced that the Times would become part of a new company called the Alabama Media Group, along with the other three newspapers and two websites owned by Advance. As part of the change, the newspapers moved to a three-day publication schedule, with print editions available only on Wednesday, Friday and Sunday. The Huntsville Times and its sister papers publish news and information seven days a week on AL.com. As of 2023, print editions have stopped production.

A few alternative newspapers are available in Huntsville. The Redstone Rocket is a newspaper distributed throughout Redstone Arsenal's housing area covering activities on Redstone. Speakin' Out News is a weekly newspaper focused on African Americans. Huntsville Magazine is a quarterly lifestyle magazine, which, "Serves as a guide to the best of the city with insightful reads on culture, people, entertainment, and businesses catalyzing the city's transformation."

=== Radio, television, and film ===
Station KIH20 broadcasts the National Weather Service's forecasts and warnings for the Huntsville area. The Huntsville DMA, which is considered a "UHF island" (a market area that only has UHF television stations), serves Madison, Limestone, and Morgan counties. Major stations include WHNT 19 (CBS, with The CW via Florence-licensed WHDF on DT2), WHIQ 25 (PBS/Alabama Public Television), WAAY 31 (ABC), WAFF 48 (NBC), and WZDX 54 (FOX, with MyNetworkTV on DT2).

A few feature films have been shot in Huntsville, including SpaceCamp, 20 Years After (2008, originally released as Like Moles, Like Rats) and Constellation (2005). Columbia Pictures filmed Ravagers (1979) in The Land Trust's Historic Three Caves Quarry, at the U.S. Space and Rocket Center, and at an antebellum home. Dark Entities (2022) takes place in Huntsville and was filmed throughout North Alabama.

Huntsville's legacy in the space program continues to draw film producers looking for background material for space-themed films. During the pre-production of Apollo 13 (1995), the cast and crew spent time at Space Camp and Marshall Space Flight Center preparing for their roles.

In 2010, Huntsville's WAFF-48 News interviewed Antoine Dodson, who at the time was a resident of the Lincoln Park housing project, after an alleged intruder attempted to rape his sister in her second-story bedroom. The interview immediately gained so much popularity that it inspired several musical remixes, including one particular music video by The Gregory Brothers, known as the "Bed Intruder Song". The popularity from the news interview would later turn Dodson into an Internet celebrity and jumpstart his career in music and acting.

== Infrastructure ==
=== Transportation ===
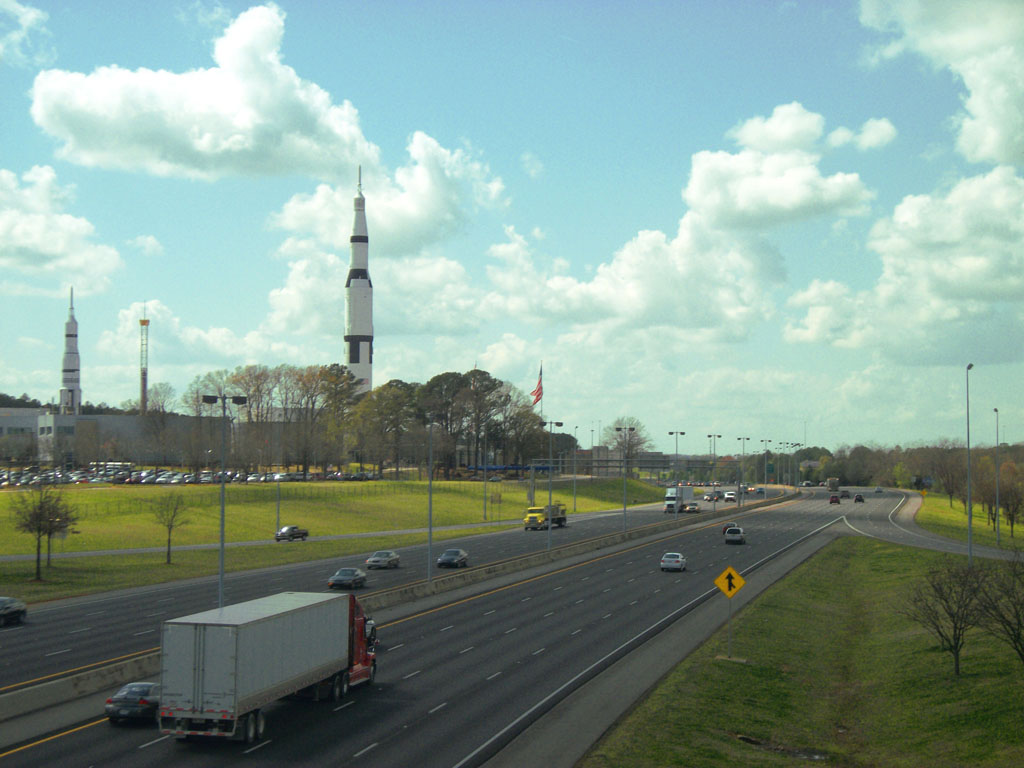
The Saturn V replica at the US Space and Rocket Center stands as a prominent landmark near mile 15 on Interstate 565.

Huntsville is served by several major highways including US 72, US 72 Alt., US 231, US 431 and Interstate 565 (with a connection to I-65 in Decatur). Alabama Highway 53 also connects the city with I-65 in Ardmore, Tennessee. Other major roadways include University Drive, Governors Drive, Airport Road, Memorial Parkway and Research Park Boulevard (SR 255).

Public transit in Huntsville is run by the city's Department of Parking and Public Transit. The Huntsville Orbit runs 11 fixed routes throughout the city, mainly around downtown and major shopping areas like Memorial Parkway and University Drive and has recently expanded some of the buses to include bike racks on the front for a trial program. The city runs Access, a demand-response transit system for the handicapped, and CommuteSmart, a county-wide carpooling program.

There are several bicycle routes in the city. There are bike paths for exercise available. Huntsville's government is working to improve bicycle network within the city limits. In 2020, Huntsville released a master plan for a 70-mile bicycling and walking trail, named Singing River Trail of North Alabama, to connect downtown Huntsville to the cities of Madison, Decatur, and Athens.

Huntsville has two active commercial rail lines. The mainline is run by Norfolk Southern, which runs from Memphis to Chattanooga, Tennessee. The original depot for this rail line, the Huntsville Depot, still exists as a railroad museum, though it no longer offers passenger service.

Another rail line, formerly part of the Louisville and Nashville Railroad (L&N), successor to the Nashville, Chattanooga and St. Louis Railway (NC&StL), is being operated by the Huntsville and Madison County Railroad Authority (HMCRA). The line connects to the Norfolk Southern line downtown and runs 13 miles (21 km) south, passing near Ditto Landing on the Tennessee River, and terminating at Norton Switch, near Hobbs Island. This service, in continuous operation since 1894, presently hauls freight and provides transloading facilities at its downtown depot location. Until the mid-1950s, the L&N provided freight and passenger service to Guntersville. The rail cars were loaded onto barges at Hobbs Island. The barge tows were taken upstream through the Guntersville Dam & Locks and discharged at Port Guntersville. Remnants of the track supporting piers still remain in the river just upstream from Hobbs Island. The service ran twice daily. L&N abandoned the line in 1984, at which time it was acquired by the newly created HMCRA, a state agency.

A third line, the Mercury and Chase Railroad, runs 10-mile (16 km) weekend tourist rides on part of another former NC&StL and L&N line from the North Alabama Railroad Museum's Chase Depot, located in the community of Chase, Alabama. Their collection includes one of the oldest diesel locomotives in existence (1926). The rail line originally connected Huntsville to NC&StL's Nashville-to-Chattanooga mainline in Decherd, Tennessee. The depot was once the smallest union station in the United States when it served the NC&StL and Memphis and Charleston Railroad, the predecessor to the Norfolk Southern.

=== Ports ===
The inland Port of Huntsville combines the Huntsville International Airport, International Intermodal Center, and Jetplex Industrial Park for truck, train and air transport. The intermodal terminal transfers truck and train cargo to aircraft. The port has on-site U.S. Customs and USDA inspectors. The port is Foreign Trade Zone No. 83.

Huntsville International Airport is served by several regional and national carriers, including American Airlines, Breeze Airways, Delta Air Lines, and United Airlines. Delivery companies have hubs in Huntsville, making flights to Europe, Asia, and Mexico. The airport was reported to have the highest fares in the United States in 2014.

Huntsville is also served by the Meridianville–located Madison County Executive Airport, sometimes denoted as Huntsville Executive Airport due to its proximity to the city. The airport is a general aviation airport and does not have any regularly scheduled commercial services.

=== Utilities ===
Electricity, water, and natural gas are all provided in Huntsville by Huntsville Utilities (HU). HU purchases and resells power from the Tennessee Valley Authority. TVA has two plants that provide electricity to the Huntsville area: Browns Ferry Nuclear Power Plant in Limestone County and Guntersville Dam in Marshall County. A third, Bellefonte Nuclear Power Plant in Jackson County, was built in the 1980s but was never activated. TVA attempted to sell the plant in 2016, but withdrew from the deal, stating they could not sell the plant under the Atomic Energy Act of 1954.

Telephone service in Huntsville is provided by AT&T, EarthLink, WOW!, and Comcast. Comcast and WOW! are the two cable providers in the Huntsville city limits. Mediacom operates in rural outlying areas. AT&T announced the start of its DSL U-verse service in the Huntsville-Decatur metro area in November 2010. AT&T and Google offer fiber Internet service across the city.

=== Public safety ===
The Huntsville Fire and Rescue provides fire protection for the city. On a daily basis the department staffs and coordinates twenty-one engine companies, five ladder trucks, four rescue trucks, along with a Special Operations Division that includes Hazardous Materials Units, Technical Rescue Units, and several specialized support units. Huntsville Fire & Rescue also has Fire Investigations, emergency response dispatch, logistics, and training divisions.

Huntsville has two volunteer public safety organizations in their city. The Huntsville-Madison County Rescue Squad is the county-wide volunteer rescue organization with tasks ranging from vehicle extrication to water rescues. The other is the Huntsville Cave Rescue Unit which is the region's only all-volunteer cave rescue organization. It is tasked with cave, cliff and high angle rope rescues. These organizations are located in Huntsville but operate both in the city and outside with HCRU, responding to many cave rescue calls coming from caves well outside the city limits.

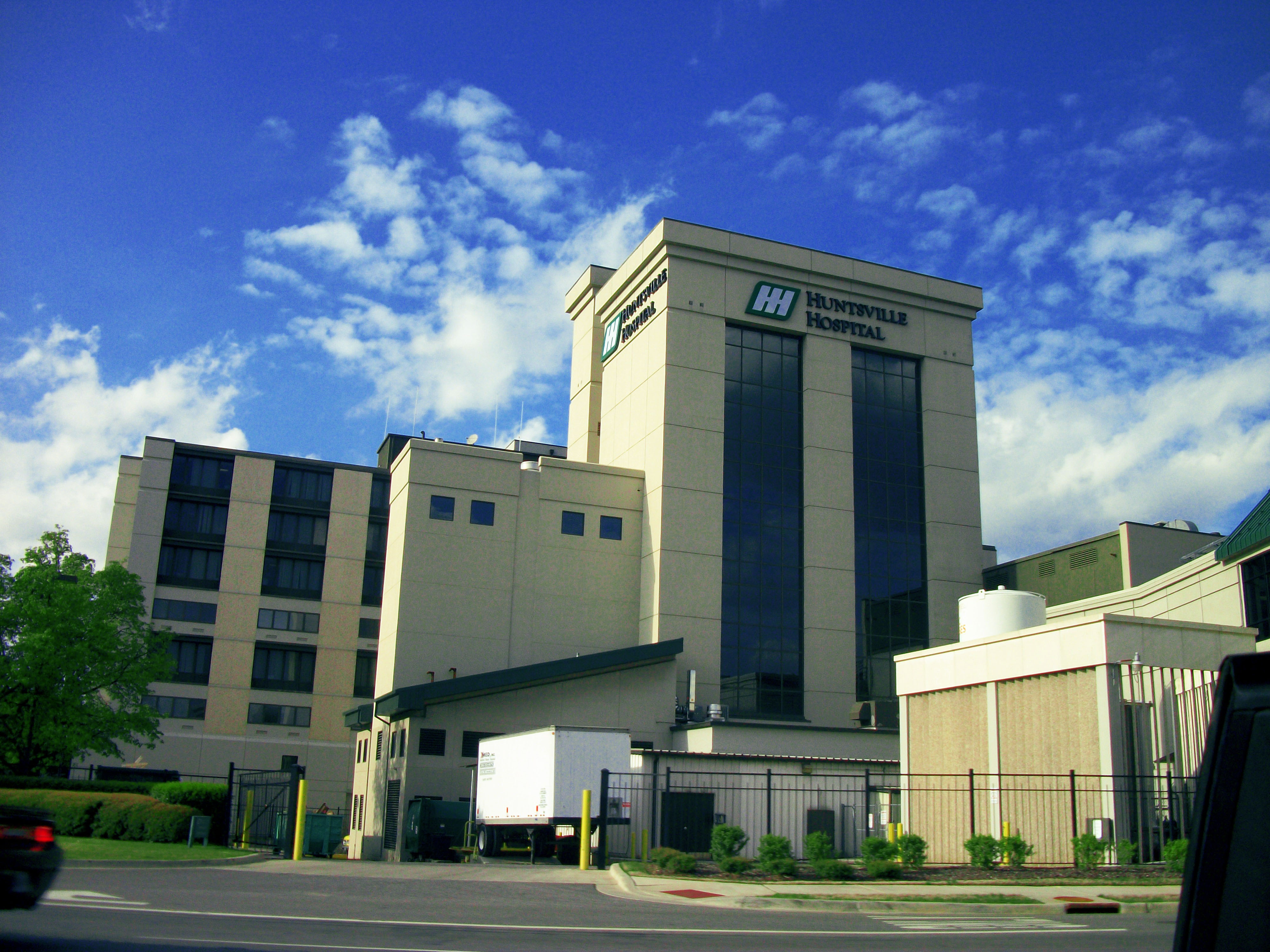
The main building of Huntsville Hospital

Huntsville Hospital in the downtown area is the largest hospital and trauma center. In 2021, Huntsville Hospital opened the Orthopedic & Spine Tower, a seven-story building with 24 surgical orthopedic suites, which brings the total bed count to 881 for Huntsville Hospital. Located further south, Crestwood Medical Center is a smaller, 180-bed teaching hospital that is ranked nationally in two specialties. Huntsville Emergency Medical Services, Inc. (HEMSI) provides emergency medical services to Huntsville and surrounding Madison county. HEMSI operates from seven stations with a fleet of 36 ambulances.

The Huntsville Police Department has three precincts and one downtown headquarters, over 500 sworn officers, 200 civilian personnel, and patrols an area of approximately 220 square miles. The department also boasts its own academy, which has been in operation since 1965.

Huntsville spent $1.2 million in 2015 to buy body cameras to be used by the Huntsville Police Department. Mayor Tommy Battle pushed for the purchase of the body cameras, saying: "We can provide a trust situation with police and our general public." The mayor also said: "Having that body cam there, having the police video there record what actually happens, and when people come in with complaints against Huntsville police officers, they get to see the action that actually happened."

Following the conviction of a former Huntsville police officer for murder, after he was originally cleared of any wrongdoing by the Police department, the City of Huntsville voted to change the way police shootings are reviewed. Beginning in August 2021, all shootings that result in death that occur by Huntsville Police are to be investigated by the Alabama Law Enforcement Agency instead. The first investigation following the policy change started in January 2022 after an off-duty Huntsville police officer allegedly killed his girlfriend. The officer had initially reported the death as a suicide; however, it was later investigated as a homicide. An advisory council created by the city described actions by Huntsville Police department (HPD) as being "in a manner that was, at a minimum, unprofessional and on multiple occasions in violation of HPD policy."

== Notable people ==
Notable people from Huntsville include Wikipedia co-founder Jimmy Wales, professional wrestler Bobby Eaton, film composer and musician Mervyn Warren, early-20th century actress Tallulah Bankhead, and horror actor David Howard Thornton (Terrifier film series).

== Sister cities ==
Huntsville has one sister city:

- Tainan, Taiwan

== Notes and references ==
=== Sources ===
- Fisk, Kelly Hamlin (2019). "Historical Context". The Civil Rights Movement in Huntsville. University of Alabama in Huntsville.
