= National Register of Historic Places listings in Jackson County, Alabama =

Location of Jackson County in Alabama

This is a list of the National Register of Historic Places listings in Jackson County, Alabama.

This is intended to be a complete list of the properties and districts on the National Register of Historic Places in Jackson County, Alabama, United States. Latitude and longitude coordinates are provided for many National Register properties and districts; these locations may be seen together in a Google map.

There are 12 properties and districts listed on the National Register in the county.

This National Park Service list is complete through NPS recent listings posted January 16, 2026.

== Current listings ==
	Name on the Register	Image	Date listed	Location	City or town	Description
1	Bridgeport Historic District	Bridgeport Historic District	May 16, 2002 (#02000479)	Roughly bounded by the Bridgeport city limits, Enrich Ave., Bridgeport, 5th Ave., Broadway Ave., 8th St., and 11th Ave. 34°56′58″N 85°42′39″W	Bridgeport	
2	Brown-Proctor House	Brown-Proctor House	September 16, 1982 (#82002036)	208 S. Houston St. 34°40′19″N 86°02′15″W	Scottsboro	
3	College Hill Historic District	College Hill Historic District	March 30, 1983 (#83002970)	306-418 and 405-411 College Ave. 34°40′12″N 86°01′42″W	Scottsboro	
4	Fort Harker	Fort Harker	May 2, 1977 (#77000205)	South of State Route 117; 34°51′41″N 85°50′24″W	Stevenson	
5	Public Square Historic District	Public Square Historic District	April 15, 1982 (#82002037)	Roughly bounded by Appletree, Andrews, Willow and Caldwell Sts. 34°40′20″N 86°02′03″W	Scottsboro	
6	Gen. William Rosecrans Headquarters	Gen. William Rosecrans Headquarters	July 12, 1978 (#78000490)	Myrtle Pl. 34°52′23″N 85°50′09″W	Stevenson	
7	Russell Cave National Monument	Russell Cave National Monument	October 15, 1966 (#66000150)	8 miles (12.8 km) west of Bridgeport via U.S. Route 72 and County Roads 91 and 75; 34°58′36″N 85°48′52″W	Bridgeport	
8	Scottsboro Memphis and Charleston Railroad Depot	Scottsboro Memphis and Charleston Railroad Depot	February 20, 1998 (#98000107)	Junction of N. Houston and Maple Ave. 34°40′30″N 86°02′13″W	Scottsboro	
9	Skyline Commissary	Skyline Commissary	June 12, 2013 (#13000365)	Northeast corner of the junction of County Roads 25 & 107; 34°48′46″N 86°07′27″W	Skyline	
10	Stevenson Historic District	Stevenson Historic District	September 13, 1978 (#78000491)	Irregular pattern along the railroad tracks 34°52′05″N 85°50′24″W	Stevenson	
11	Stevenson Railroad Depot and Hotel	Stevenson Railroad Depot and Hotel	May 13, 1976 (#76000329)	Main St. 34°52′02″N 85°50′24″W	Stevenson	
12	Townsend Farmhouse		August 11, 2005 (#05000838)	Eastern side of County Road 34, 0.8 miles north of County Road 234; 34°46′30″N 85°59′32″W	Hollywood	

== See also ==
- List of National Historic Landmarks in Alabama
- National Register of Historic Places listings in Alabama
