= Stevenson Historic District =

Historic district in Alabama, United States

- U.S. National Register of Historic Places
- U.S. Historic district
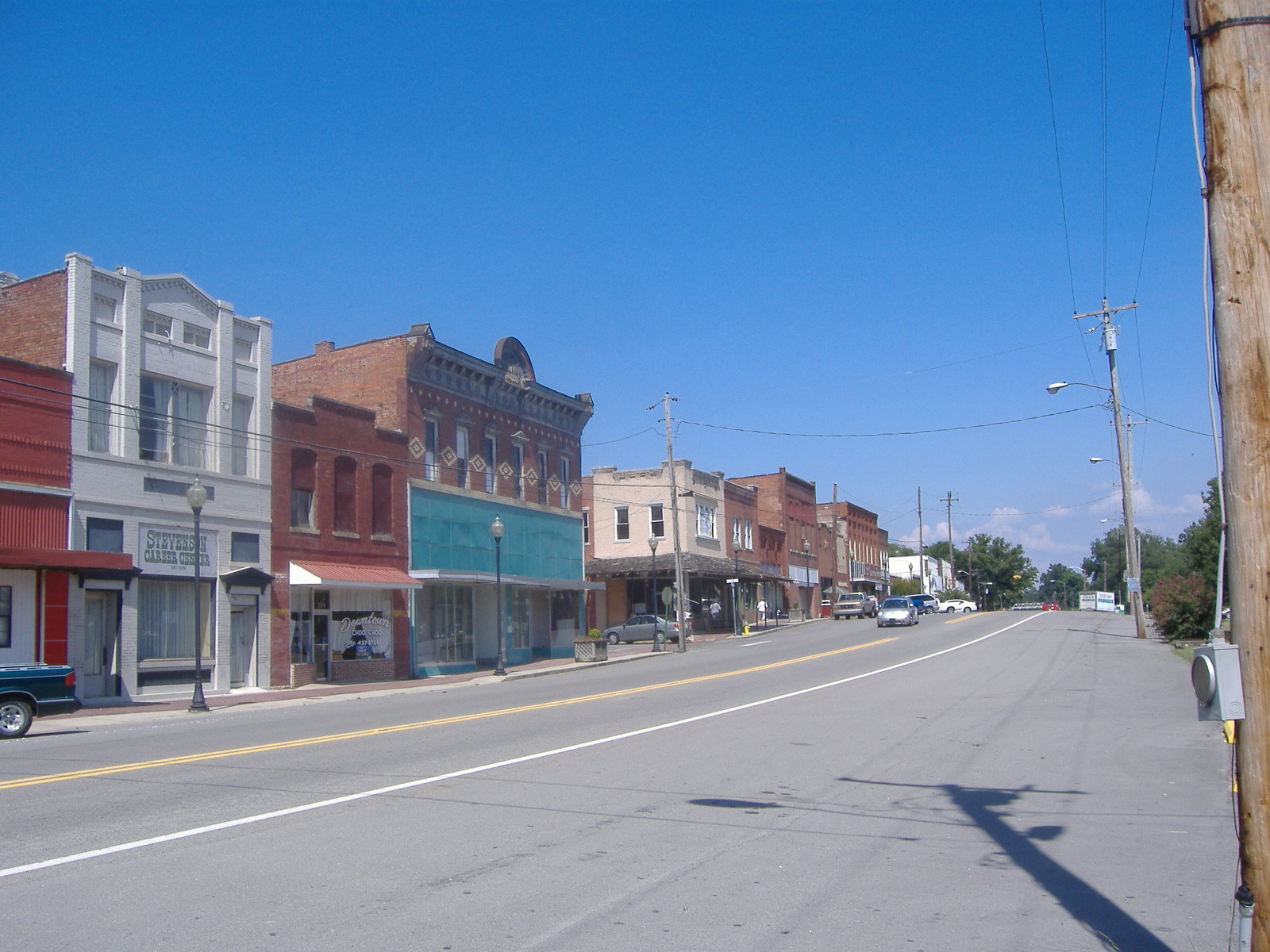
- Buildings on Main Street in 2009

- Location within Alabama Location within the United States
- Location: Irregular pattern along RR tracks, Stevenson, Alabama
- Coordinates: 34°52′5″N 85°50′24″W
- Area: 91.3 acres (36.9 ha)
- Architectural style: Greek Revival, Queen Anne, Italianate
- NRHP reference No.: 78000491
- Added to NRHP: September 13, 1978

The Stevenson Historic District is a historic district in Stevenson, Alabama, United States. The town was founded in the 1850s at the junction of the Nashville and Chattanooga Railroad (now the Louisville and Nashville Railroad) and the Memphis and Charleston Railroad (later part of the Southern Railway and today Norfolk Southern). Named for Vernon King Stevenson, the first president of the Nashville & Chattanooga, the town played a vital role in the Civil War as a Union Army headquarters for operations around Chattanooga, Tennessee. Despite postwar efforts to introduce other industrial development to the town, Stevenson's growth stayed tied to the railroad. The district contains several houses and commercial buildings, as well as railroad- and military-related structures constructed between the 1850s and the early 20th century. The Greek Revival Cowan-Rudder House on Main Street served as the headquarters of Union General Włodzimierz Krzyżanowski from 1863 until 1865. Many frame commercial buildings were destroyed in a 1911 fire and replaced with brick and masonry structures; one notable building to survive the fire is the Italianate City Hall, built circa 1875 to house the town bank. The Stevenson Railroad Depot and Hotel was built in 1872 as a joint project of the Memphis & Charleston and Nashville & Chattanooga railroads. The district was listed on the National Register of Historic Places in 1978.
