= General William Rosecrans Headquarters =

Historic house in Alabama, United States

- Gen. William Rosecrans Headquarters
- U.S. National Register of Historic Places
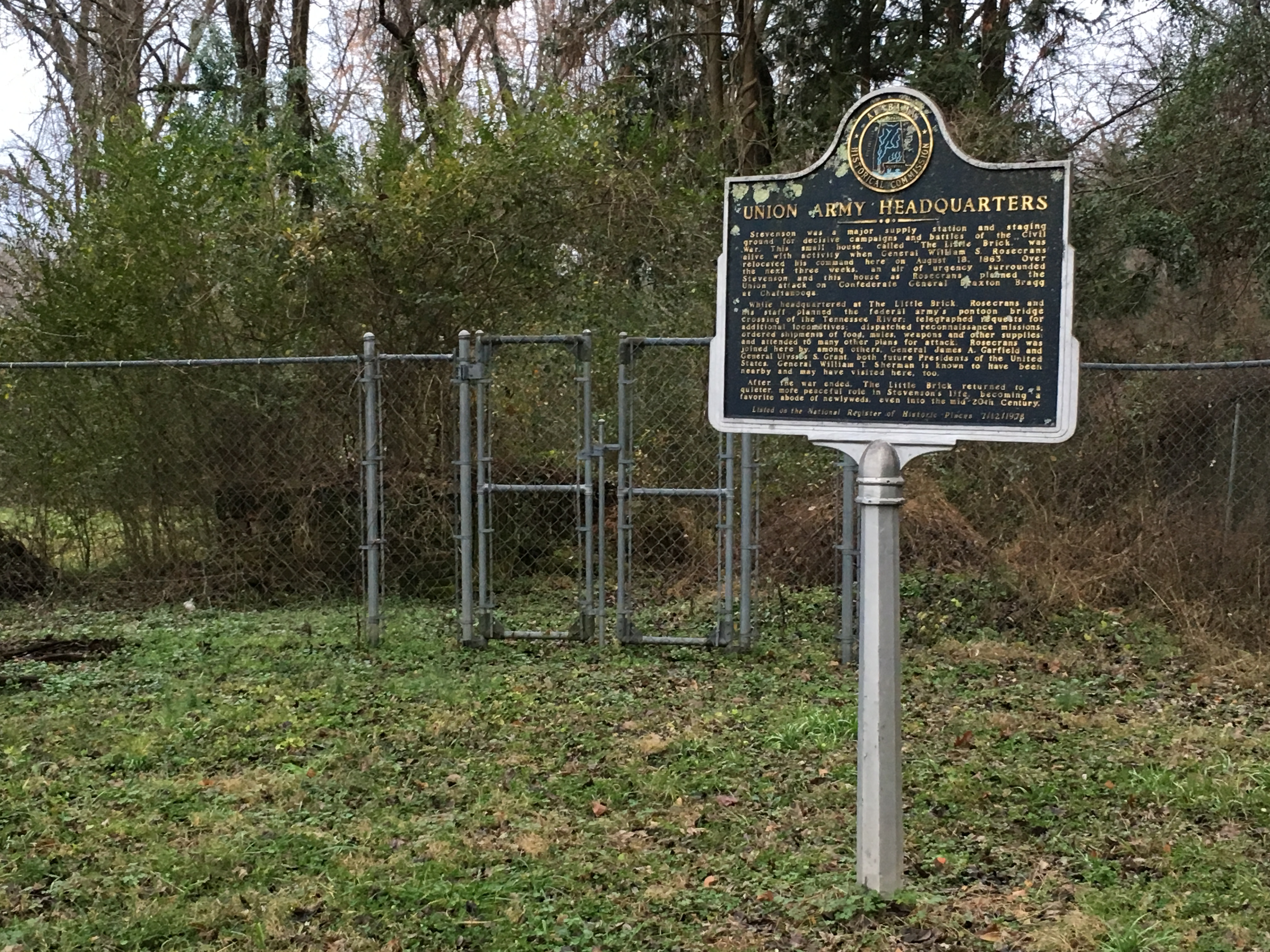

- Location within Alabama Location within the United States
- Location: Myrtle Pl. Stevenson, Alabama
- Coordinates: 34°52′23″N 85°50′9″W
- Area: 1 acre (0.40 ha)
- Built: 1855
- NRHP reference No.: 78000490
- Added to NRHP: July 12, 1978

The General William Rosecrans Headquarters (also known as the Rosser Alston House) is a historic residence in Stevenson, Alabama, United States. The house is a single-story brick hall and parlor house built circa 1855 as a residence for railroad engineers who were building the routes through Jackson County. In the buildup to the Chickamauga Campaign of the American Civil War, Union General William Rosecrans selected Stevenson as the staging site for battle. In addition to building Fort Harker just south of town, Rosecrans used the house as his personal headquarters. Walter Rosser, a construction engineer from Michigan, purchased the house and land before the war, and lived in the house after the war. As of 1978, the house was in ruins, with the roof, one wall and parts of the others collapsed. The house was listed on the National Register of Historic Places in 1978.
