= Stevenson Railroad Depot and Hotel =

- U.S. National Register of Historic Places
- Alabama Register of Landmarks and Heritage
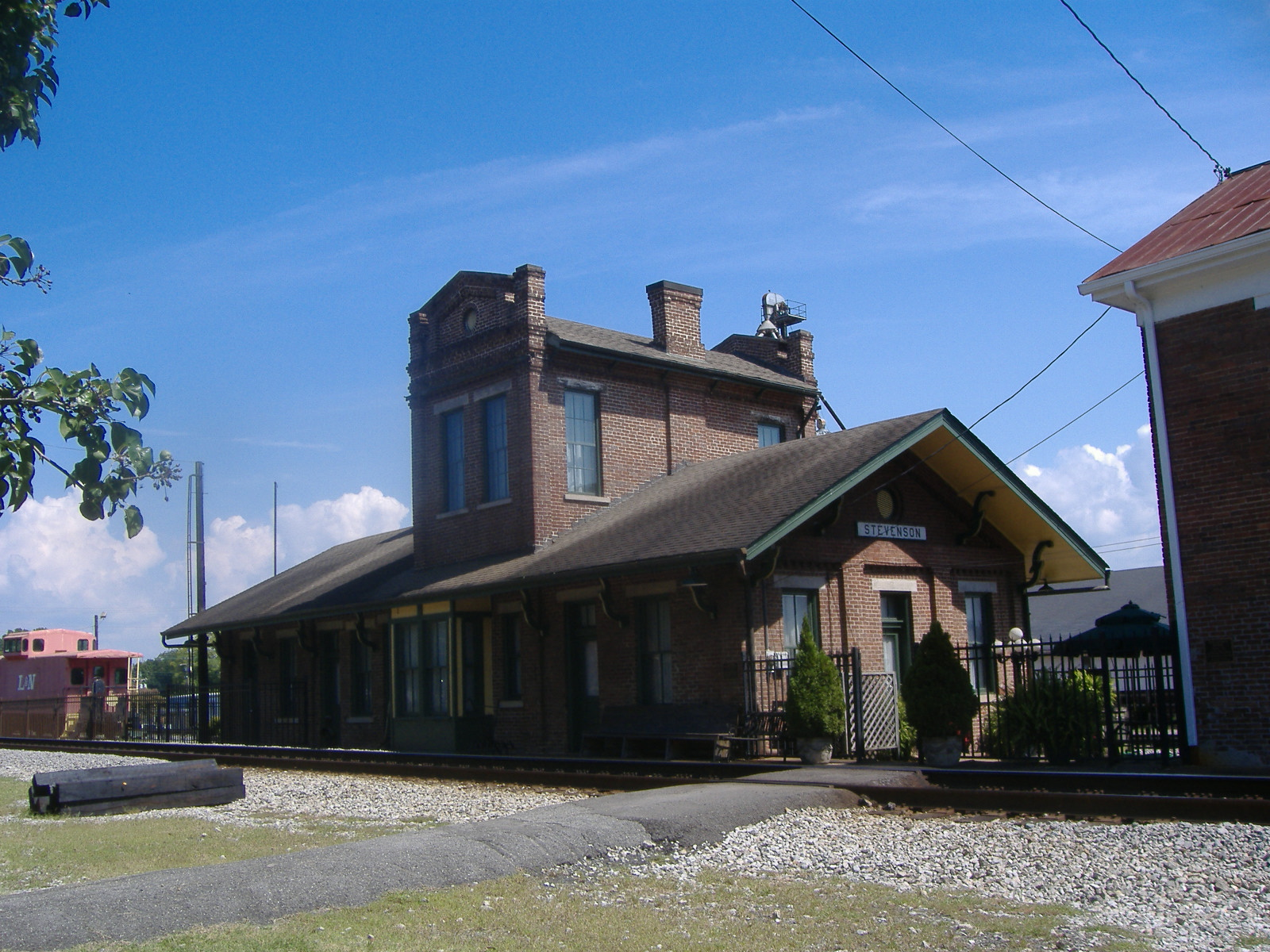
- The depot in 2009

- Location within Alabama Location within the United States
- Location: Main St., Stevenson, Alabama
- Coordinates: 34°52′2″N 85°50′24″W
- Area: 0.7 acres (0.28 ha)
- Built: 1872
- Architectural style: Italianate
- Part of: Stevenson Historic District (ID78000491)
- NRHP reference No.: 76000329

Significant dates
- Added to NRHP: May 13, 1976
- Designated ARLH: September 15, 1975

The Stevenson Railroad Depot and Hotel station are a historic train station and hotel in Stevenson, Alabama, United States. They were built circa 1872 as a joint project of the Memphis and Charleston Railroad and the Nashville and Chattanooga Railroad, whose lines converged in Stevenson. When the Memphis & Charleston was purchased by the Southern Railway in 1898, the Louisville and Nashville Railroad (who had taken over the N&C in 1880) took sole control of the depot and operated it until 1976. It was converted into a history museum in 1982. Both buildings are brick with gable roofs and Italianate details. The depot has a central, second-story tower that was added in 1887. The three-story hotel had a lobby, dining room, and kitchen on the first floor and eight large guest rooms on the upper floors. The buildings were listed on the Alabama Register of Landmarks and Heritage in 1975 and the National Register of Historic Places in 1976.

The building is now operated as the Stevenson Railroad Depot Museum and features area railroad and Civil War artifacts.

Preceding station	Nashville, Chattanooga and St. Louis Railway	Following station
Bass toward Memphis	Main Line	Bridgeport toward Atlanta
Preceding station	Southern Railway	Following station
Fackler toward Memphis	Memphis – Bristol	Bridgeport toward Bristol
