= Scottsboro station =

- Scottsboro Memphis and Charleston Railroad Depot
- U.S. National Register of Historic Places
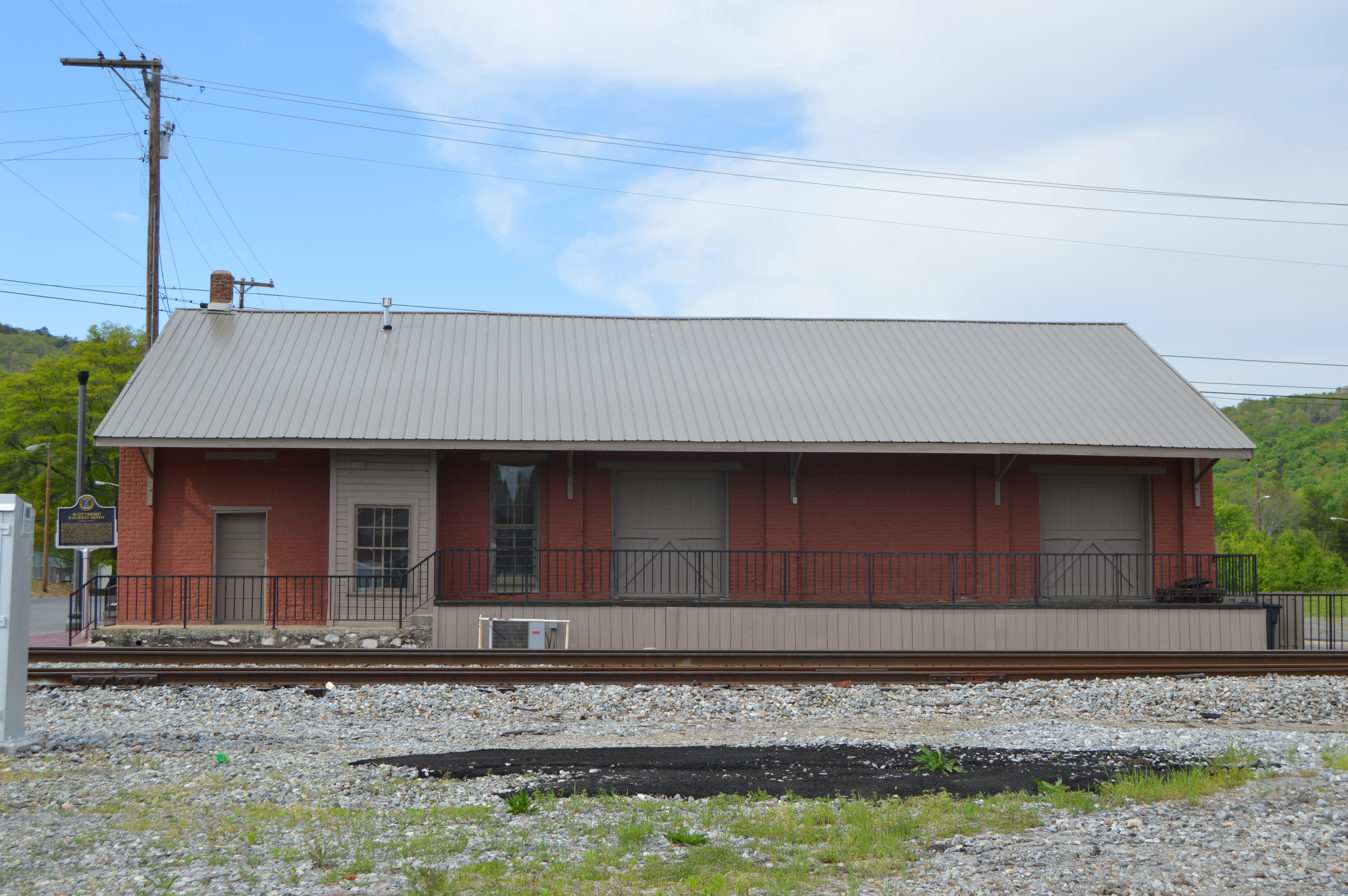
- The depot in April 2014

- Location within Alabama Location within the United States
- Location: Jct. of N. Houston and Maple Ave., Scottsboro, Alabama
- Coordinates: 34°40′30″N 86°2′13″W
- Area: 0.5 acres (0.20 ha)
- Built: 1861
- NRHP reference No.: 98000107
- Added to NRHP: February 20, 1998

The Scottsboro Memphis and Charleston Depot is a historic train station in Scottsboro, Alabama, US. Built in 1861 on the eve of the American Civil War, the depot is one of three remaining antebellum depots in Alabama built by the Memphis and Charleston Railroad, and the only one outside Huntsville. On January 8, 1865, it was the site of a skirmish between members of the 101st and 110th U.S. Colored Infantry Regiment and Confederate forces which resulted in the retreating rebels setting fire it.

After being heavily damaged during the war, the rail line and depot became operational again in 1866. While the line and depot changed hands several times in the late 1800s, the depot served both passengers and freight until 1892, when a separate passenger depot was constructed by the East Tennessee, Virginia and Georgia Railway.

The depot continued to service freight until it was closed by Norfolk Southern in the 1980s. Restoration began in 1991 and today it houses the Scottsboro Depot Museum. The building is divided into a 30 x 46 foot (9 x 14 m) freight room and a 30 x 18 foot (9 x 5.5 m) office. The building was listed on the National Register of Historic Places in 1998.

Preceding station	Southern Railway	Following station
Larkinsville toward Memphis	Memphis – Bristol	Hollywood toward Bristol
