= Siege of Bridgeport =

Battle of the American Civil War

- Part of the American Civil War
| Date | April 23, 1862 |
| Location | Bridgeport, Jackson County, Alabama 34.953°N 85.708°W |
| Result | Union victory |

Belligerents
| United States (Union) | CSA (Confederacy) |

Strength
| 5,000 | 450 |
- Location within Alabama

Skirmishes at or near Bridgeport, Alabama between Union Army and Confederate States Army forces occurred on April 23, 27 and 29 (West Bridge), 1862 during the American Civil War. A modern newspaper article called the April 1862 action the siege of Bridgeport after a modern re-enactment event, although the actions are described as skirmishes by other sources such as Dyer (1908), Long (1971) and the U.S. National Park Service. Other skirmishes occurred at Bridgeport on August 27, 1862 and July 27, 1863, which involved an attack on a steamer. Union forces occupied Bridgeport after an engagement on July 29, 1863.
