= Public Square Historic District (Scottsboro, Alabama) =

Historic district in Alabama, United States

- U.S. National Register of Historic Places
- U.S. Historic district
- Alabama Register of Landmarks and Heritage
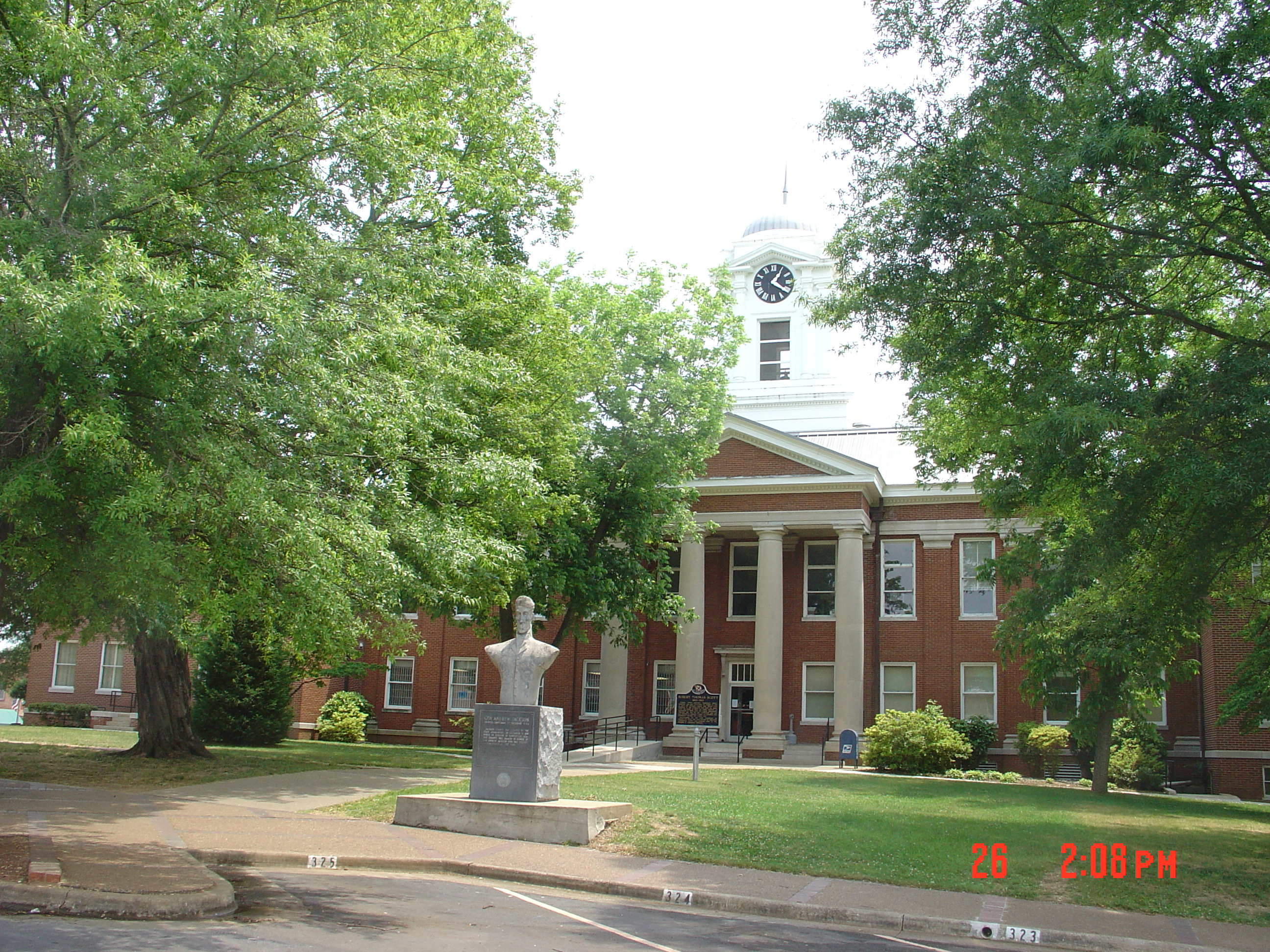
- The Jackson County Courthouse in May 2007

- Location within Alabama Location within the United States
- Location: Roughly bounded by Appletree, Andrews, Willow and Caldwell Sts., Scottsboro, Alabama
- Coordinates: 34°40′20″N 86°2′3″W
- Area: 11 acres (4.5 ha)
- Architect: Richard H. Hunt
- Architectural style: Classical Revival; Victorian
- NRHP reference No.: 82002037

Significant dates
- Added to NRHP: April 15, 1982
- Designated ARLH: June 29, 1981

The Public Square Historic District is a historic district in Scottsboro, Alabama, United States. Although Scottsboro had been the county seat of Jackson County since 1870, the town's earliest commercial development was centered on the Memphis and Charleston Railroad line, one block north of the square. After an 1881 fire along the rail line, some businesses began to rebuild around the square. Once the Tennessee Valley Authority brought prosperity to the region in the 1930s, development around the courthouse began to accelerate. The current Jackson County Courthouse was built in 1912 with matching Classical Revival porticos on two sides. Commercial buildings around the square are one or two stories and all of brick. While most are built in simple, lightly decorated commercial styles, some late 19th-century buildings have Victorian detailing. The district was listed on the Alabama Register of Landmarks and Heritage in 1981 and the National Register of Historic Places in 1982.
