= Bridgeport Depot Museum =

- Bridgeport Station (Southern Railway)
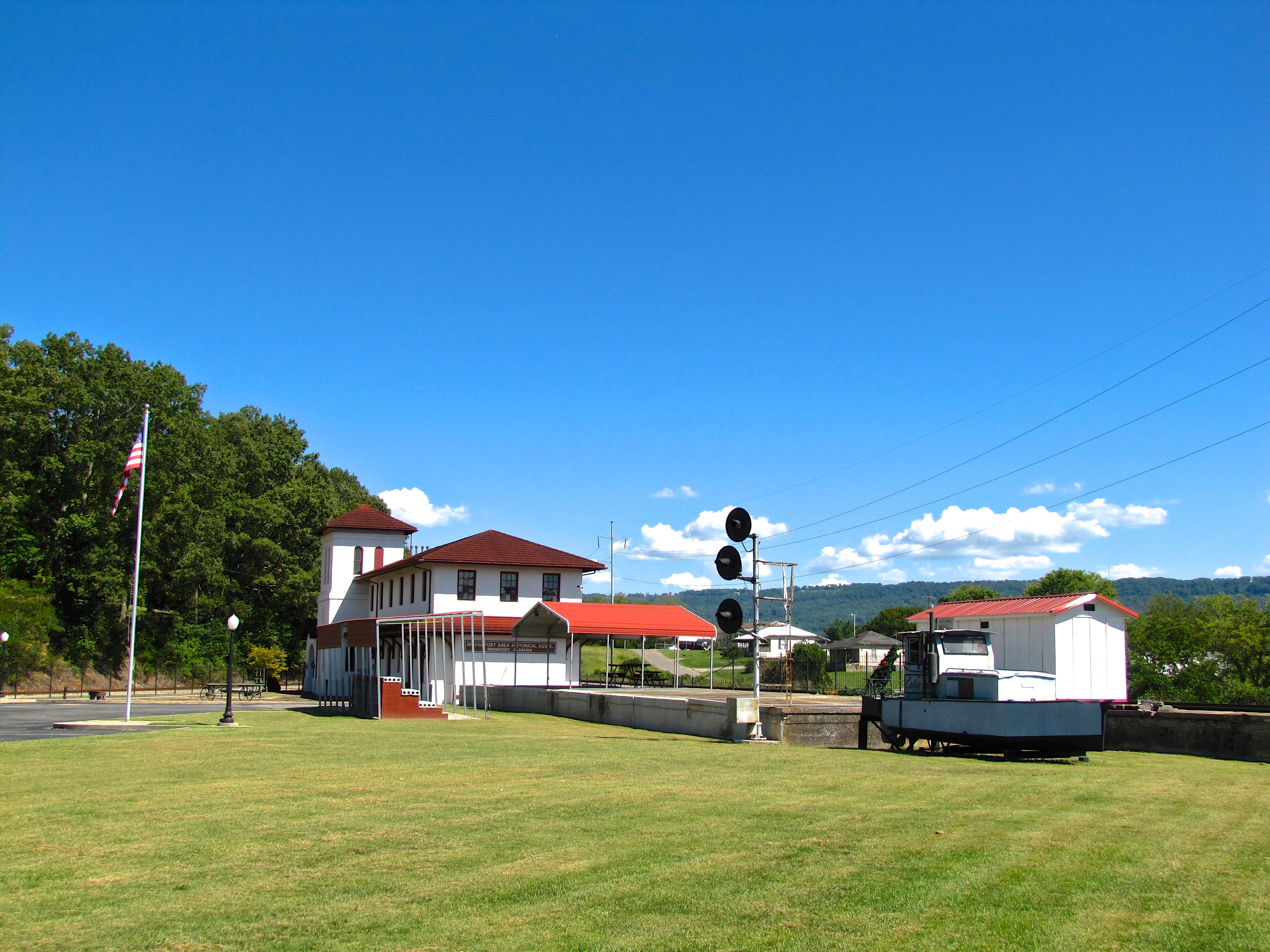
- Bridgeport Depot Museum
- Location: Bridgeport, Alabama
- Coordinates: 34.9486°N 85.7110°W
- Type: Transport museum History museum
- Owner: Bridgeport Area Historical Association

Alabama Register of Landmarks and Heritage
- Designated: September 15, 1975

The Bridgeport Depot Museum, sometimes called the Bridgeport Depot in Bridgeport, Alabama is home to railroad memorabilia as well as a range of local artifacts. Items in the museum's collection date back to 1807 with Bridgeport News issues going back to 1891, post office and tax records as well as items related to Bridgeport's role in the American Civil War. The museum, operated by the Bridgeport Area Historical Association, is located on the site of the town's fourth railroad depot, which was constructed in 1917.

== See also ==
- List of Civil War Discovery Trail sites

Preceding station	Nashville, Chattanooga and St. Louis Railway	Following station
Stevenson toward Memphis	Main Line	Shellmound toward Atlanta
Terminus	Bridgeport-Pikeville	Richard City toward Pikeville
Orme Terminus	Orme Branch	Terminus
Preceding station	Southern Railway	Following station
Stevenson toward Memphis	Memphis – Bristol	Long Island toward Bristol
