= Bridgeport Historic District =

Historic district in Alabama, United States

- U.S. National Register of Historic Places
- U.S. Historic district
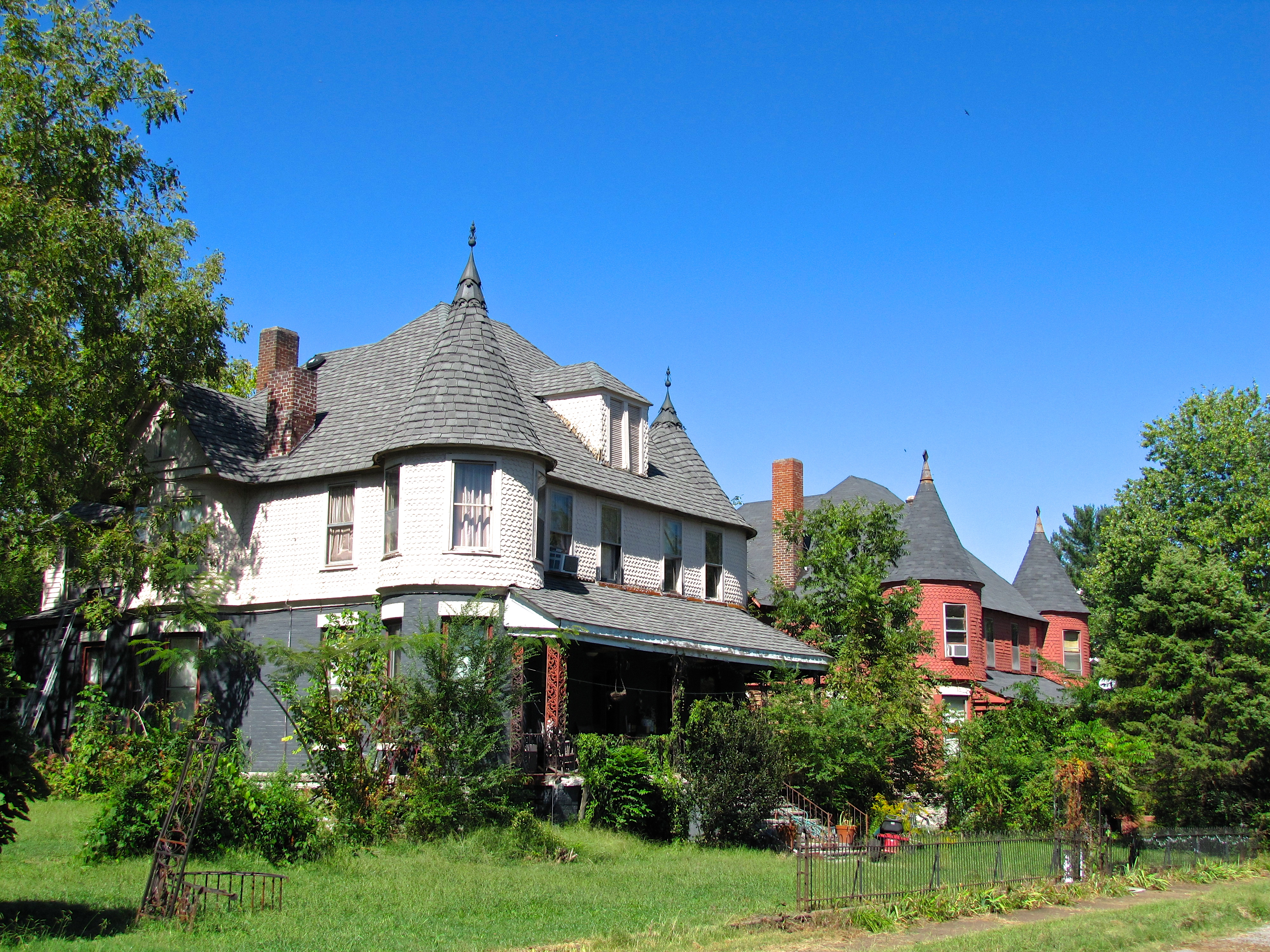
- Queen Anne houses in Bridgeport

- Location within Alabama Location within the United States
- Location: Roughly bounded by Bridgeport City Limits, Enrich Ave., Bridgeport, 5th Ave., Broadway Ave., 8th St., and 11th Ave., Bridgeport, Alabama
- Coordinates: 34°56′58″N 85°42′39″W
- Area: 160 acres (65 ha)
- Built: 1862
- Architect: multiple, including Charles I. Edwards, Theodore S. Holmes
- NRHP reference No.: 02000479
- Added to NRHP: May 16, 2002

The Bridgeport Historic District is a historic district in Bridgeport, Alabama, United States. Founded in the 1810s as a farming community, Bridgeport became a major transportation hub with the coming of the Nashville and Chattanooga Railroad and Southern Railway in the 1850s, in addition to its Tennessee River port. Due to the importance of its rail bridge, the town changed hands several times during the course of the Civil War. Industry began to move into the area in the late 1880s and 1890s, and commercial development of the downtown area soon followed. The district retains several one- and two-story commercial buildings, most constructed out of brick in simple styles popular in the late 19th and early 20th centuries. Many of the elite built their homes on Battery Hill, overlooking the river. The district contains several Victorian and Queen Anne houses, as well as Bungalows and Vernacular styles. The Mission Revival Nashville, Chattanooga, and St. Louis Railroad depot, three railroad bridges, and three Civil War fortifications are also contained in the district. The district was listed on the National Register of Historic Places in 2002.
