= Townsend Farmhouse =

Historic farmouse in Alabama, US

- U.S. National Register of Historic Places
- Location within Alabama Location within the United States
- Location: Cty Rte 34, E side, 0.8 mi. N of Cty Rte 234, Hollywood, Alabama
- Coordinates: 34°46′30″N 85°59′32″W
- Area: 6.7 acres (2.7 ha)
- Built: 1870
- Architectural style: Folk Victorian
- NRHP reference No.: 05000838
- Added to NRHP: August 11, 2005

The Townsend Farmhouse is a historic residence near Hollywood, Alabama, United States. The farm is situated at the base of Poorhouse Mountain, and consists of the main house, built circa 1870; a two-room log house, built circa 1860 and today used for storage; and several outbuildings dating from the mid-20th century and later. The center-hall house has a gable roof, with a tall, cross-gable pediment. The exterior is clad in clapboard atop the rough-cut limestone block foundation. Two limestone chimneys project from the gable ends. The front porch and entry exhibit Folk Victorian details. A three-bay ell extends from the rear of the house. The house was listed on the National Register of Historic Places in 2005.
