= Jacob Lyda =

American country music singer (born 1975)

- Born: May 18, 1975 (age 50); Stevenson, Alabama
- Genres: Country
- Occupation: Singer
- Instrument: Vocals
- Years active: 1995-present
- Labels: BGR (Bob Grady Records) in association with Country Discovery Records 1995-2003. Davis Music Group 2011-

Jacob Lyda (born May 18, 1975) is an American country music singer. His first four albums were produced by Mike Headrick for BGR Records/Country Discovery Records 1995–2003. He is now signed to Davis Music Group and is being promoted by Nine North Records. In early 2011, Lyda released his debut single "I'm Doin' Alright", which has charted on Hot Country Songs. Lyda co-wrote the song with Paul Overstreet.

The song was to have been included on his album Another Song I Just Had to Write.

Karlie Justus of Engine 145 gave the song a "thumbs up", saying that the song was "something greater than the sum of its parts". She praised its sound and the "charisma" in Lyda's voice.

== Discography ==
=== Albums ===
- 1995 - My Dreams Just Came True - BGR 9502
- 1997 - Here We Go Again - BGR 9509
- 1998 - Three Times the Charm - BGR/Country Discovery CD1103
- 2003 - Back in the Swing - Country Discovery CD1052

=== Singles ===
Year	Single	Peak positions	Album
Year	Single	US Country	Album
2011	"I'm Doing Alright"	53	Another Song I Just Had to Write (unreleased)
2011	"Born at a Truck Stop"	—	Another Song I Just Had to Write (unreleased)
"—" denotes releases that did not chart

=== Music videos ===
Year	Title	Director
2011	"I'm Doing Alright"	Mitchell Stuart
