= Bridgeport, Alabama =

City in Alabama, United States

Bridgeport
- City
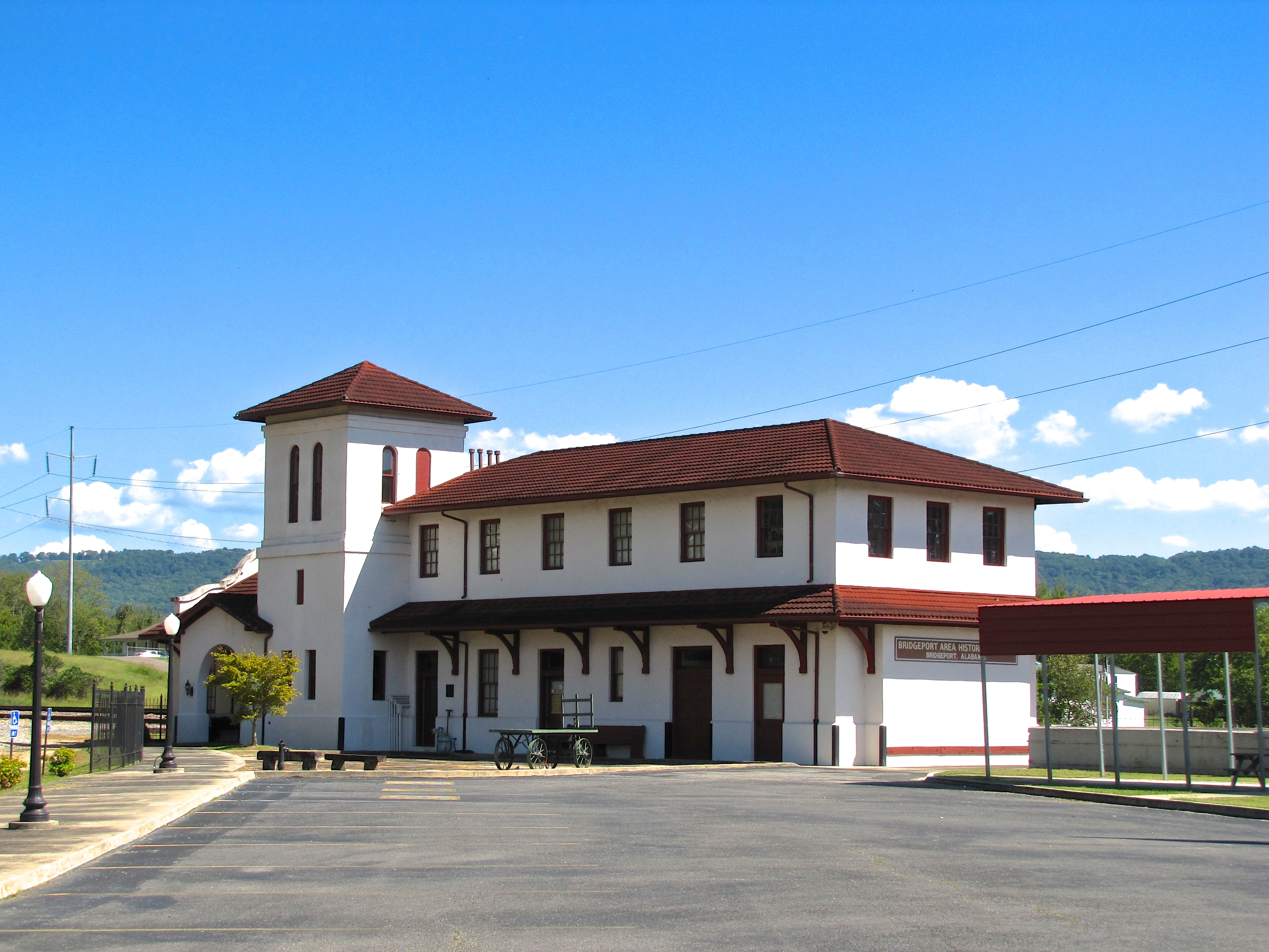
- Bridgeport Depot

- Flag Seal

- Location of Bridgeport in Jackson County, Alabama.
- Coordinates: 34°56′50″N 85°42′50″W
- Country: United States
- State: Alabama
- County: Jackson

Area
  - Total: 4.46 sq mi (11.54 km^{2})
  - Land: 4.33 sq mi (11.21 km^{2})
  - Water: 0.13 sq mi (0.33 km^{2})
- Elevation: 673 ft (205 m)

Population (2020)
  - Total: 2,264
  - Density: 523.1/sq mi (201.96/km^{2})
- Time zone: UTC-6 (Central (CST))
  - Summer (DST): UTC-5 (CDT)
- ZIP code: 35740
- Area code: 256
- FIPS code: 01-09328
- GNIS feature ID: 0114905
- Website: bridgeport-al.com

Bridgeport is a city in Jackson County, Alabama, United States. At the time of 2020 census the population was 2,264, down from 2,418 in 2010. Bridgeport is included in the Chattanooga-Cleveland-Dalton, TN-GA-AL Combined Statistical Area.

== History ==
Bridgeport developed after the 1840s, when European Americans established a riverboat landing here along the Tennessee River. This landing was a place for local farmers to trade their crops for other goods. Within a few years, a small hamlet known as "Jonesville" had developed around the landing, and included a trading post, gristmill, warehouses, and several saloons. The Jonesville post office opened in 1852.

Fluctuating river levels made riverboat trade unreliable, and area merchants began campaigning for railroad access in the late 1840s. The first rail line reached Jonesville in 1852. A railroad bridge over the Tennessee River was completed in 1854, connecting the city with Chattanooga, Tennessee. In recognition of this accomplishment, the name of the city was changed to "Bridgeport." Construction of a second rail line connecting Bridgeport with Jasper, Tennessee, to the north, began in 1860, but was not completed until after the Civil War.

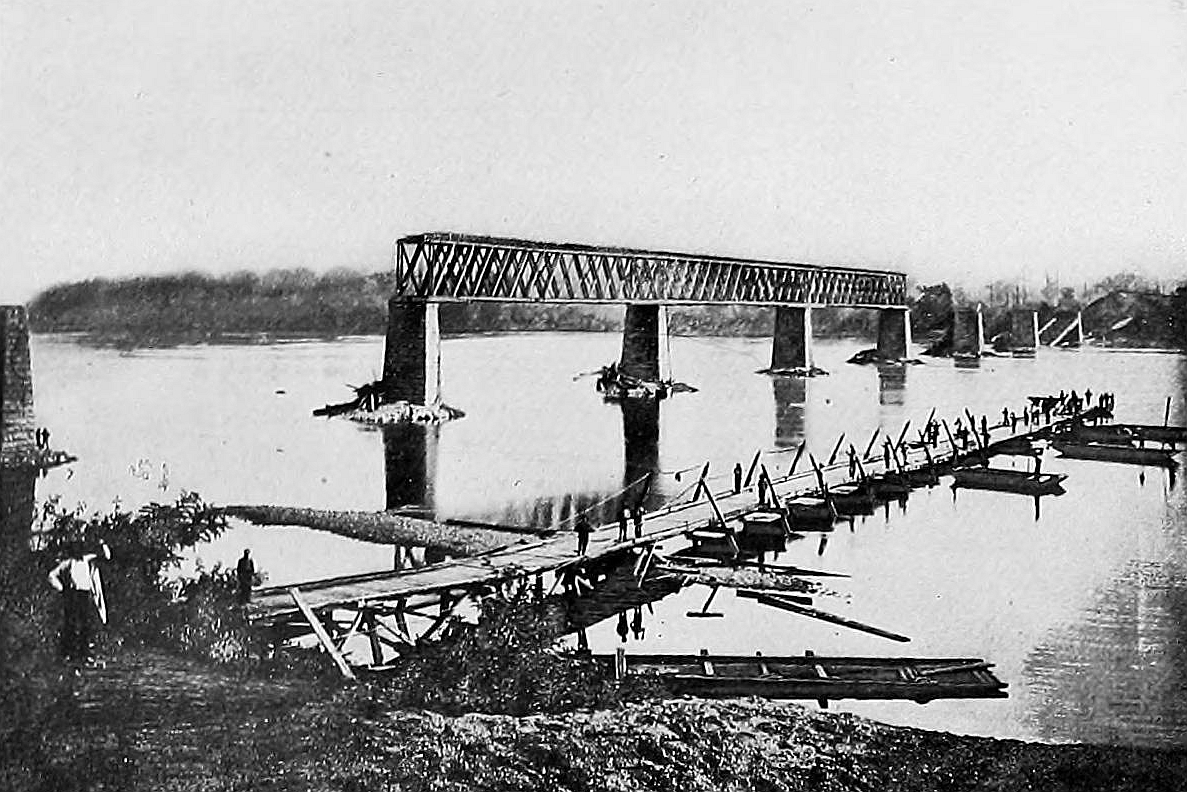
Railway bridge in Bridgeport destroyed by retreating Confederates, 1861

Because of its location on both a rail line and the Tennessee River, Bridgeport was a strategic site during the Civil War. The rail bridge at Bridgeport was among those targeted by the East Tennessee bridge-burning conspiracy in November 1861. Although this attempt failed, the bridge would be burned twice during the course of the war.

Bridgeport was the site of numerous skirmishes across 1862 and 1863 when Union General Ormsby Mitchel seized control of the city, and numerous other small actions over the following year as Confederate forces attempted to regain control of the area. The city was burned by Confederate troops under General Braxton Bragg in the Summer of 1863, but it was reoccupied by Union forces. In the latter part of the war, Bridgeport was the site of a major Union shipyard that built gunboats and transports for the Union Army. The USS Chattanooga was built here; it became a vital part of the famous "Cracker Line," which broke the Confederates' siege of Chattanooga in November 1863.

In the early 1880s, brothers Frank and Walter Kilpatrick, investors from New York, along with their father, Edward, established a lumber company in Bridgeport. Believing the city's location and resources had extraordinary potential for development, the Kilpatricks began buying up land in the area. Other investors became interested in the city, and in 1889 the Bridgeport Land and Development Company was incorporated. This company bought up land and laid out a new grid pattern for the city, which incorporated in 1891.

Frank Kilpatrick, who became the city's mayor, built a series of imposing Queen Anne-style houses on the street now known as Kilpatrick Row. Several factories, including a pipe works, stove works, rail car works, and planing mill, were built along the river. The rapid development of Bridgeport came to an abrupt end, however, with the onset of the financial Panic of 1893. Investors withdrew from the area, and the Bridgeport Land and Improvement Company went out of business.

Frank Kilpatrick returned to Bridgeport in 1895, and managed to lure some industry to the city. The Mission Revival-style Bridgeport Depot was completed in 1917, and two hosiery mills were operating in the city by the 1920s. The construction of the nearby Widows Creek Power Plant by the Tennessee Valley Authority in the 1950s brought a small housing boom to the city.

On January 22, 1999, at 10:02 A.M, three people were killed, at least eight more were critically injured, and three buildings were leveled when a gas pipeline exploded in downtown Bridgeport. Earlier that morning, between 8:15 and 9:15 A.M, the line was damaged when workers digging a trench with a backhoe pulled the line, causing two leaks. Gas filled a building and came in contact with the pilot light of a gas heater, causing the explosion.

== Geography ==
According to the U.S. Census Bureau, the city has a total area of 3.2 square miles (8.3 km^{2}), of which 3.1 square miles (8.0 km^{2}) is land and 0.1 square miles (0.26 km^{2}) (4.00%) is water. The city is situated along the western bank of the Tennessee River, at river mile 410. This section of the river is part of Guntersville Lake, which is created by Guntersville Dam about 60 miles downstream from Bridgeport. The Cumberland Plateau rises prominently to the northwest, and the plateau's southern extension, Sand Mountain, rises across the river to the east. U.S. Route 72 connects Bridgeport with South Pittsburg across the Tennessee state line to the north, and Stevenson to the southwest.

Russell Cave National Monument is located close to Bridgeport.

=== Climate ===
The climate in this area is characterized by hot, humid summers and generally mild to cool winters. According to the Köppen Climate Classification system, Bridgeport has a humid subtropical climate, abbreviated "Cfa" on climate maps.

Climate data for Russell Cave National Monument (5 miles northwest of Bridgepoint) (1991–2020 normals, extremes 1955–present)
Month	Jan	Feb	Mar	Apr	May	Jun	Jul	Aug	Sep	Oct	Nov	Dec	Year
Record high °F (°C)	76 (24)	81 (27)	86 (30)	91 (33)	97 (36)	100 (38)	102 (39)	105 (41)	102 (39)	97 (36)	88 (31)	77 (25)	105 (41)
Mean daily maximum °F (°C)	48.4 (9.1)	53.0 (11.7)	62.1 (16.7)	71.3 (21.8)	78.2 (25.7)	84.8 (29.3)	87.7 (30.9)	87.2 (30.7)	82.1 (27.8)	71.6 (22.0)	60.2 (15.7)	51.3 (10.7)	69.8 (21.0)
Daily mean °F (°C)	38.8 (3.8)	42.6 (5.9)	50.4 (10.2)	58.7 (14.8)	67.0 (19.4)	74.2 (23.4)	77.6 (25.3)	76.8 (24.9)	71.2 (21.8)	59.7 (15.4)	49.0 (9.4)	41.5 (5.3)	59.0 (15.0)
Mean daily minimum °F (°C)	29.1 (−1.6)	32.2 (0.1)	38.7 (3.7)	46.0 (7.8)	55.7 (13.2)	63.6 (17.6)	67.5 (19.7)	66.4 (19.1)	60.3 (15.7)	47.8 (8.8)	37.7 (3.2)	31.7 (−0.2)	48.1 (8.9)
Record low °F (°C)	−13 (−25)	−4 (−20)	9 (−13)	22 (−6)	23 (−5)	38 (3)	49 (9)	46 (8)	32 (0)	21 (−6)	10 (−12)	−6 (−21)	−13 (−25)
Average precipitation inches (mm)	5.64 (143)	5.66 (144)	5.72 (145)	5.74 (146)	4.16 (106)	4.75 (121)	5.42 (138)	4.01 (102)	4.43 (113)	3.63 (92)	4.90 (124)	6.18 (157)	60.24 (1,530)
Source: NOAA

== Demographics ==
Historical population
Census	Pop.	Note	%±
1900	1,247		—
1910	2,125		70.4%
1920	2,018		−5.0%
1930	2,124		5.3%
1940	2,031		−4.4%
1950	2,386		17.5%
1960	2,906		21.8%
1970	2,908		0.1%
1980	2,974		2.3%
1990	2,936		−1.3%
2000	2,728		−7.1%
2010	2,418		−11.4%
2020	2,264		−6.4%
U.S. Decennial Census; 2013 Estimate

=== Racial and ethnic composition ===
Bridgeport, city, Alabama – Racial and ethnic composition Note: the US Census treats Hispanic/Latino as an ethnic category. This table excludes Latinos from the racial categories and assigns them to a separate category. Hispanics/Latinos may be of any race.
Race / Ethnicity (NH = Non-Hispanic)	Pop 1980	Pop 1990	Pop 2000	Pop 2010	Pop 2020	% 1980	% 1990	% 2000	% 2010	% 2020
White alone (NH)	2,722	2,593	2,367	2,019	1,851	92.49%	88.32%	86.77%	83.50%	81.76%
Black or African American alone (NH)	221	256	219	207	190	7.51%	8.72%	8.03%	8.56%	8.39%
Native American or Alaska Native alone (NH)	0	74	38	45	30	0.00%	2.52%	1.39%	1.86%	1.33%
Asian alone (NH)	0	12	3	4	10	0.00%	0.41%	0.11%	0.17%	0.44%
Native Hawaiian or Pacific Islander alone (NH)	x	x	0	0	0	x	x	0.00%	0.00%	0.00%
Other race alone (NH)	0	1	4	5	11	0.00%	0.03%	0.15%	0.21%	0.49%
Mixed race or Multiracial (NH)	x	x	61	96	140	x	x	2.24%	3.97%	6.18%
Hispanic or Latino (any race)	0	0	36	42	32	0.00%	0.00%	1.32%	1.74%	1.41%
Total	2,943	2,936	2,728	2,418	2,264	100.00%	100.00%	100.00%	100.00%	100.00%

=== 2020 census ===
As of the 2020 census, there were 2,264 people and 586 families residing in the city.

The median age was 42.6 years. 20.5% of residents were under the age of 18 and 20.8% were 65 years of age or older.

For every 100 females there were 88.8 males, and for every 100 females age 18 and over there were 86.6 males age 18 and over.

96.6% of residents lived in urban areas, while 3.4% lived in rural areas.

There were 1,001 households in Bridgeport, of which 25.9% had children under the age of 18 living in them. Of all households, 39.9% were married-couple households, 20.4% were households with a male householder and no spouse or partner present, and 32.8% were households with a female householder and no spouse or partner present. About 34.9% of all households were made up of individuals and 16.4% had someone living alone who was 65 years of age or older.

There were 1,187 housing units, of which 15.7% were vacant. The homeowner vacancy rate was 4.0% and the rental vacancy rate was 13.1%.

=== 2010 census ===
At the 2010 census there were 2,418 people in 1,012 households, including 686 families, in the city. The population density was 755.6 inhabitants per square mile (291.7/km^{2}). There were 1,159 housing units at an average density of 362.2 per square mile (139.8/km^{2}). The racial makeup of the city was 84.0% White, 8.6% Black or African American, 1.9% Native American, 0.2% Asian, 1.2% from other races, and 4.1% from two or more races. 1.7% of the population were Hispanic or Latino of any race. Of the 1,012 households 26.4% had children under the age of 18 living with them, 45.0% were married couples living together, 15.3% had a female householder with no husband present, and 32.2% were non-families. 27.9% of households were one person and 13.1% were one person aged 65 or older. The average household size was 2.39 and the average family size was 2.89.

The age distribution was 23.9% under the age of 18, 7.8% from 18 to 24, 23.1% from 25 to 44, 28.9% from 45 to 64, and 16.4% 65 or older. The median age was 40.5 years. For every 100 females, there were 95.9 males. For every 100 females age 18 and over, there were 95.3 males.

The median household income was $36,282 and the median family income was $43,239. Males had a median income of $44,188 versus $28,944 for females. The per capita income for the city was $19,048. About 14.0% of families and 16.0% of the population were below the poverty line, including 32.1% of those under age 18 and 4.6% of those age 65 or over.

=== 2000 census ===
At the 2000 census there were 2,728 people in 1,159 households, including 793 families, in the city. The population density was 875.4 inhabitants per square mile (338.0/km^{2}). There were 1,290 housing units at an average density of 414.0 per square mile (159.8/km^{2}). The racial makeup of the city was 87.76% White, 8.03% Black or African American, 1.43% Native American, 0.11% Asian, 0.37% from other races, and 2.31% from two or more races. 1.32% of the population were Hispanic or Latino of any race.

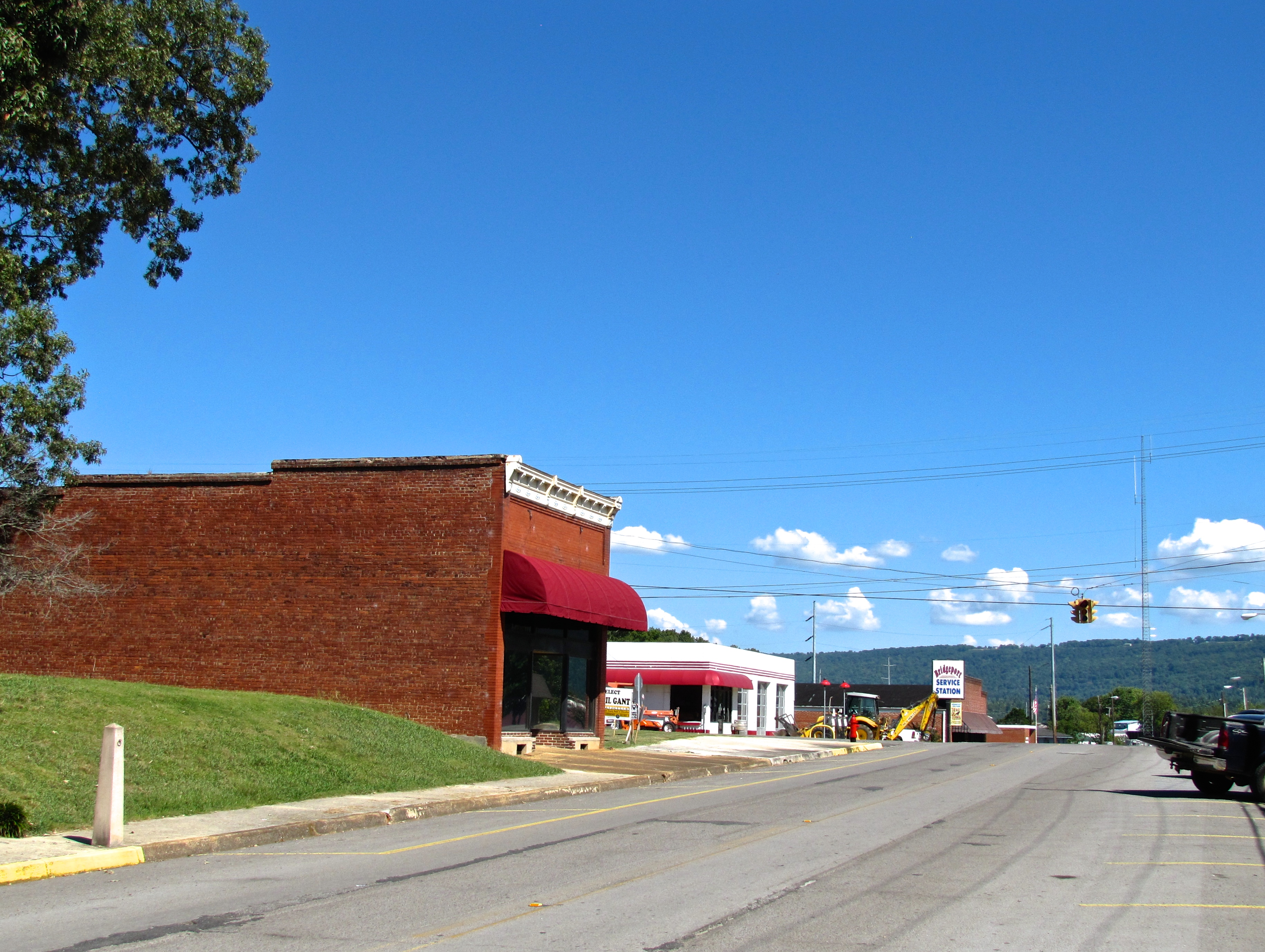
Buildings along Alabama Avenue

Of the 1,159 households 29.7% had children under the age of 18 living with them, 49.7% were married couples living together, 13.9% had a female householder with no husband present, and 31.5% were non-families. 29.5% of households were one person and 13.1% were one person aged 65 or older. The average household size was 2.35 and the average family size was 2.88.

The age distribution was 24.0% under the age of 18, 8.4% from 18 to 24, 27.1% from 25 to 44, 24.9% from 45 to 64, and 15.5% 65 or older. The median age was 38 years. For every 100 females, there were 90.2 males. For every 100 females age 18 and over, there were 86.3 males.

The median household income was $28,981 and the median family income was $33,712. Males had a median income of $30,685 versus $19,583 for females. The per capita income for the city was $15,779. About 9.5% of families and 13.4% of the population were below the poverty line, including 17.4% of those under age 18 and 23.8% of those age 65 or over.

== Culture ==
The Bridgeport Depot Museum is home to railroad memorabilia as well as a range of local artifacts. The museum, operated by the Bridgeport Area Historical Association, is located on the site of the town's fourth railroad depot, which was constructed in 1917.

Every April, Bridgeport hosts a reenactment of the Siege of Bridgeport.
