= USS Chattanooga =

Four ships of the United States Navy have been named Chattanooga, after the city of Chattanooga, Tennessee.

- USS Chattanooga was the first steamboat built by the Federals on the upper Tennessee River, a flagship of the "Cracker Line" (1863).
- USS Chattanooga (1864) was a steam sloop in use from 1866 to 1871.
- USS Chattanooga (C-16) was a Denver-class protected cruiser in service from 1904 to 1921.
- USS Chattanooga (PF-65) was a Tacoma-class frigate, renamed Uniontown on 18 August 1944 before its commissioning.
- USS Chattanooga (CL-118) was a planned Fargo-class light cruiser but construction was canceled 12 August 1945, prior to launching.

In 1917, the Angel Hotel, Cardiff, Wales, was requisitioned on behalf of the US Navy and was renamed USS Chattanooga.
