= Fort Harker (Alabama) =

- U.S. National Register of Historic Places
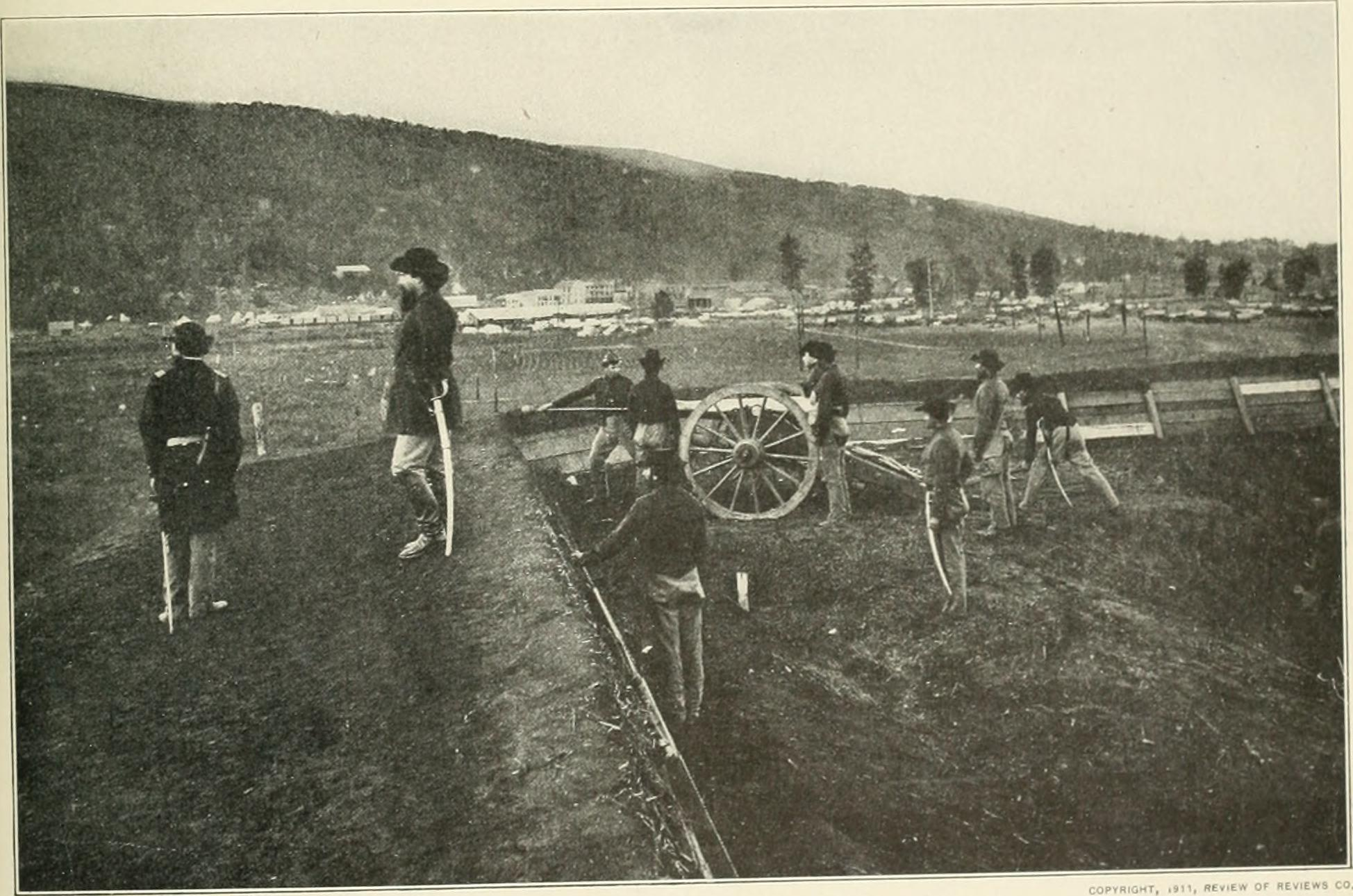
- Fort Harker Artillery

- Location within Alabama
- Location: South of AL 117
- Nearest city: Stevenson, Alabama
- Coordinates: 34°51′41″N 85°50′24″W
- Built: 1862
- NRHP reference No.: 77000205
- Added to NRHP: May 2, 1977

Fort Harker, located near Stevenson, Alabama, United States, was a military fortification built by the Union Army during the American Civil War. Constructed in the summer of 1862 by soldiers and freed slaves of the Army of the Cumberland, the fort helped secure strategic railroad lines to ensure the free movement of Union troops and supplies in southeastern Tennessee and northeastern Alabama. Union General William Rosecrans established his headquarters at Fort Harker in July, 1863, from where he directed a successful campaign against the position of Confederate General Braxton Bragg in Chattanooga, Tennessee. The fort would be abandoned after the war and fall into disrepair. After restoration, the site became a city park in 1985.

== History ==
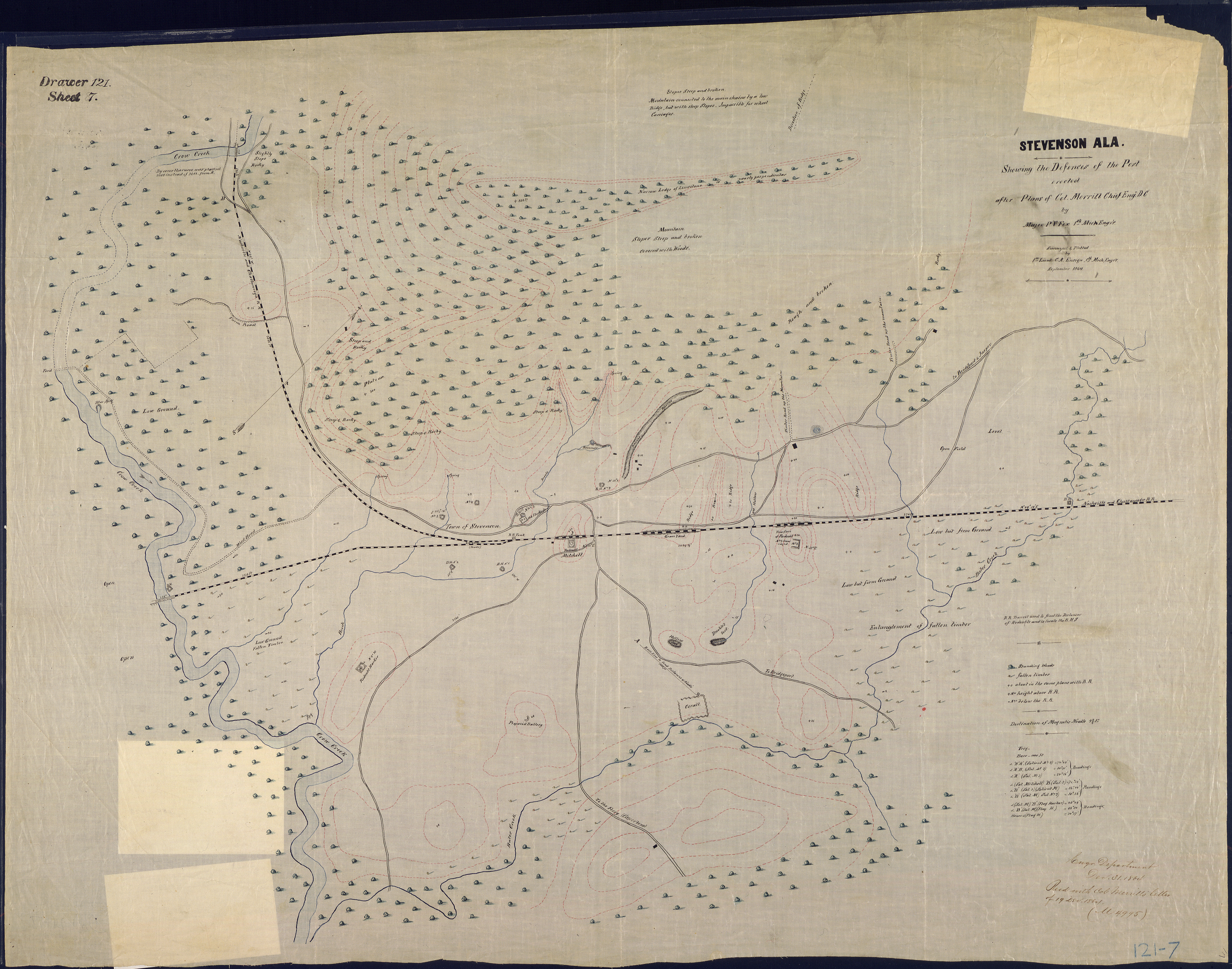
1864 map of Stevenson, Alabama and vicinity showing defenses.

Fort Harker was built to defend a strategic position captured by Union troops in northeastern Alabama. Situated atop a hill east of the town of Stevenson, it was constructed in the summer of 1862 by soldiers and freed slaves of the Army of the Cumberland, commanded by Union General William Rosecrans. Stevenson was located at the junction for the Memphis and Charleston Railroad and the Nashville and Chattanooga Railroad. The location of the fort placed it within firing range of the town, railroads, supply depots, and warehouses. In addition to Fort Harker, the Union Army established a hospital and a refugee camp in the town. The Union position would prevent Confederate troops from using the railroads in the defense of Chattanooga and secure critical supply lines for the Army of the Cumberland.

The design of the fort is typical of many built during the American Civil War. The fort was constructed as a square earthen redoubt, 45 meters (148 feet) on a side. The walls were constructed of rammed earth 4.3 meters (14 feet) high, surrounded by a 2.5 meters (8.2 feet) deep dry moat. The fort was armed with seven barbettes for heavy cannon, and a bomb-proof powder magazine. Access to the fort was by draw bridge across the moat. An eight-sided wooden blockhouse was situated at the center of the redoubt.

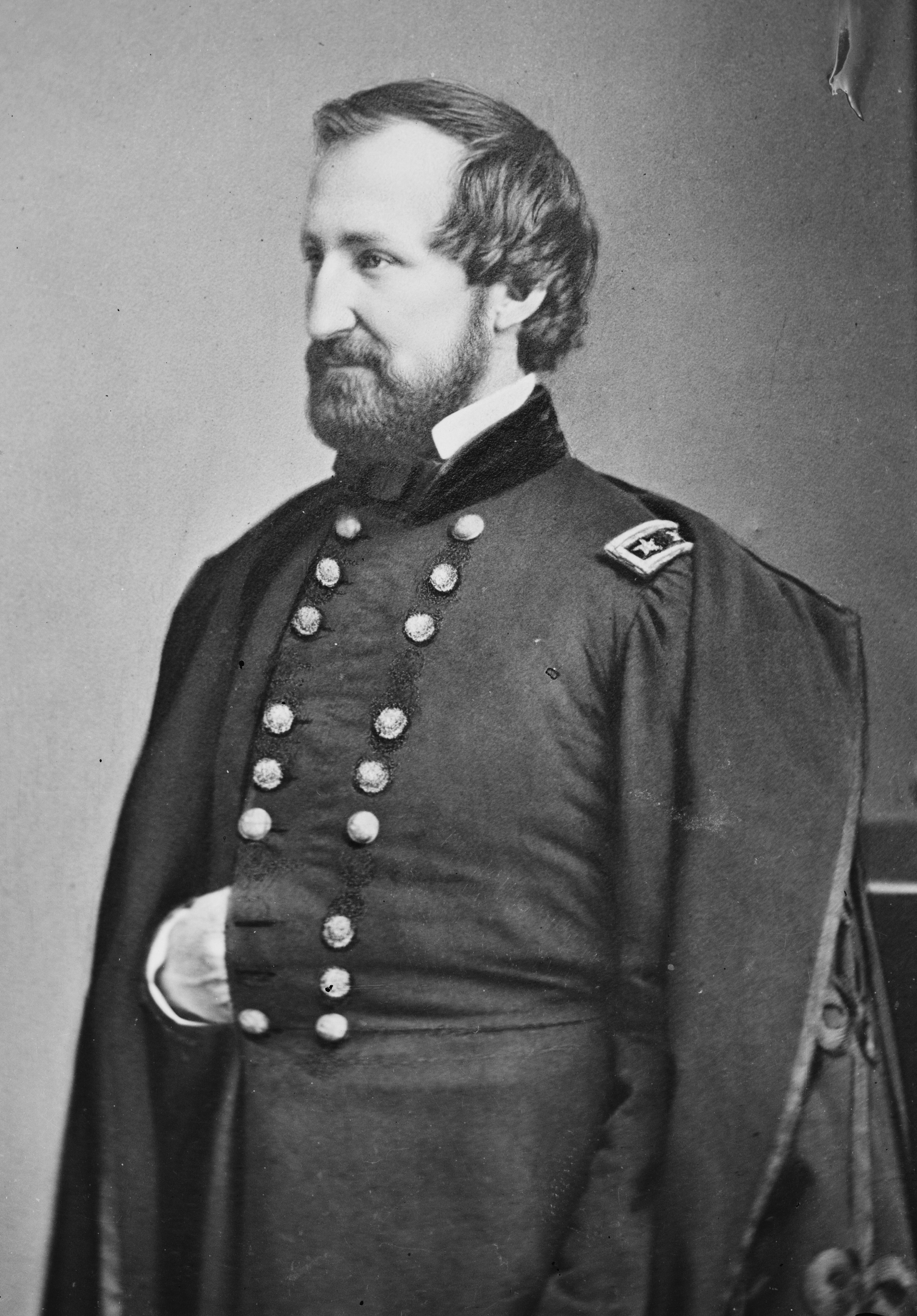
General William Rosencrans

General Rosecrans established his headquarters at Fort Harker in July, 1863, from where he directed a successful campaign against the position of Confederate General Braxton Bragg and the Army of Tennessee in Chattanooga, Tennessee. After the decisive defeat of the Confederate Army, Rosecrans failed to vigorously pursue his enemy. Bragg and his troops retreated in an orderly fashion southeast into Georgia, where Rosecrans and Bragg would meet again in the Battle of Chickamauga. The Union army at Chickamauga was soundly defeated and all but routed, forcing Rosecrans and his men to retreat back to Chattanooga. Besieged by Confederate troops, Rosecrans was relieved of his command by General Ulysses S. Grant, who placed General George H. Thomas in command. The Battle of Chattanooga began on November 24, 1863, and the Union victory would secure southeastern Tennessee and northeastern Alabama, including Fort Harker, for the duration of the war.

Fort Harker was abandoned at the end of the American Civil War. It fell into disrepair, and was used by local residents for agricultural purposes, including gardens and hog farming. Excavation of the site for historical preservation began in 1976. Restoration of the site for public access began in 1985. Repairs to the fort addressed damage cause by mountain bike riders and the use of the fort walls for target practice by the Stevenson Police Department.

== Gallery ==
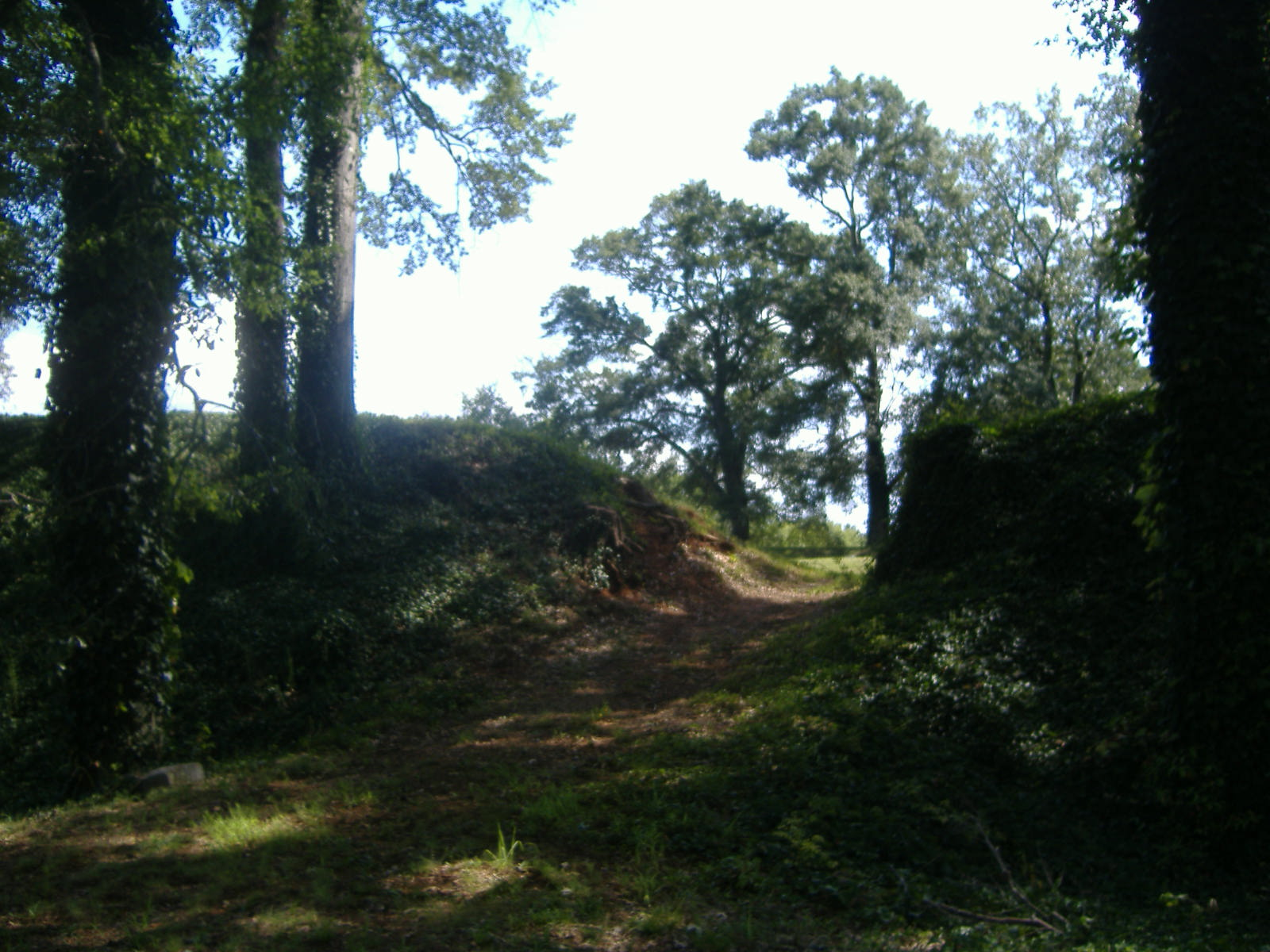
Outside the entrance

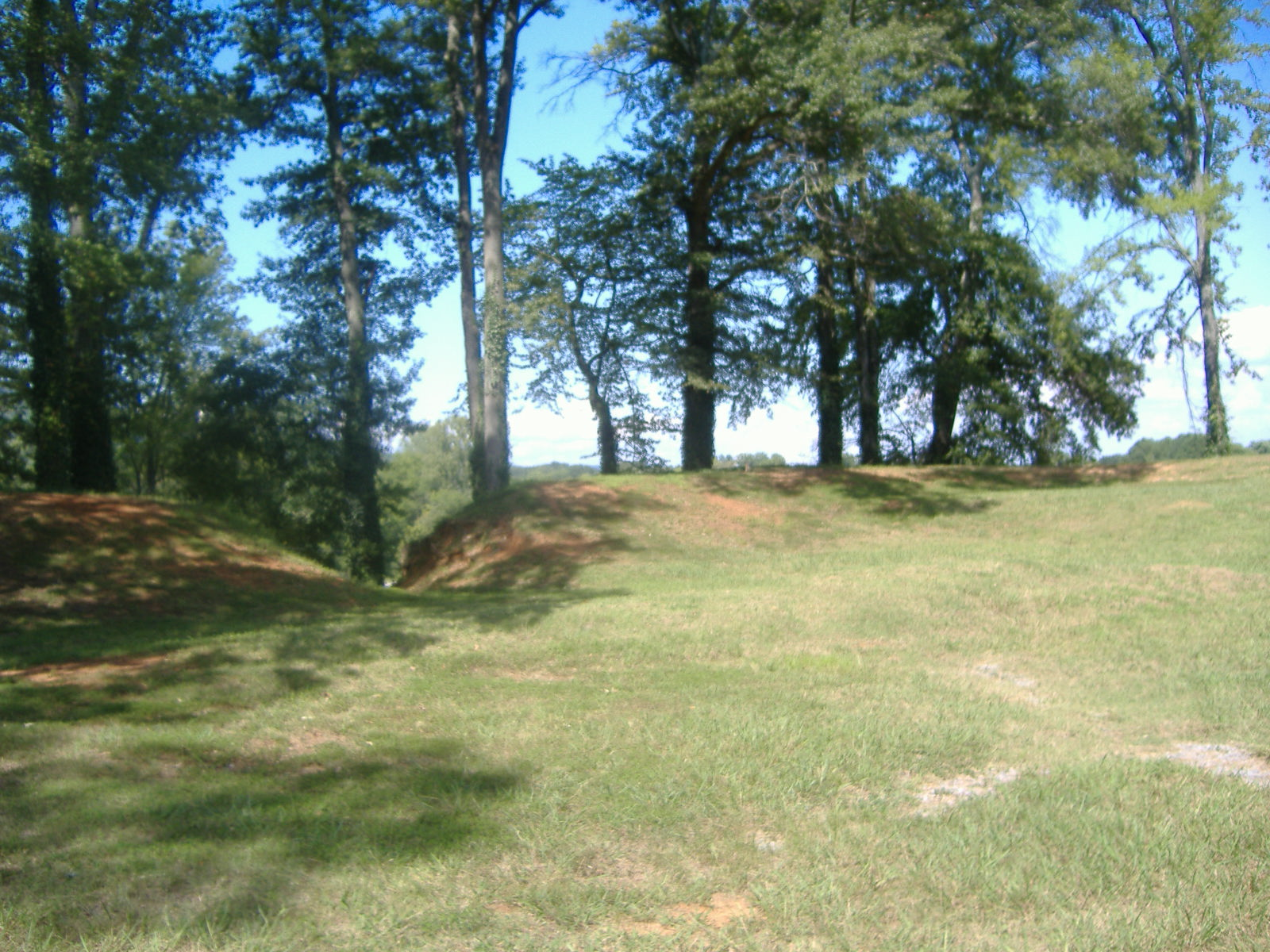
Inside the entrance

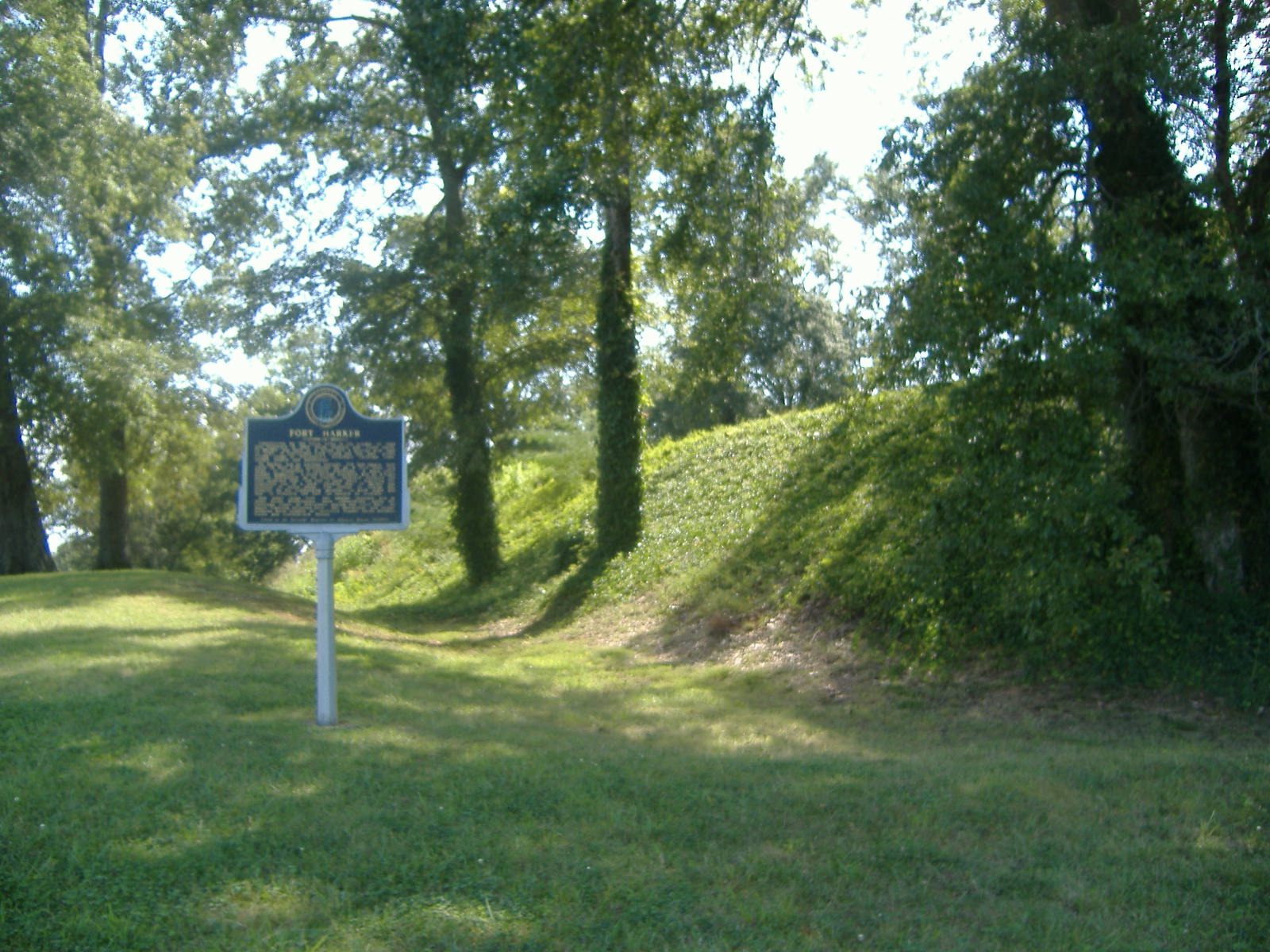
North side

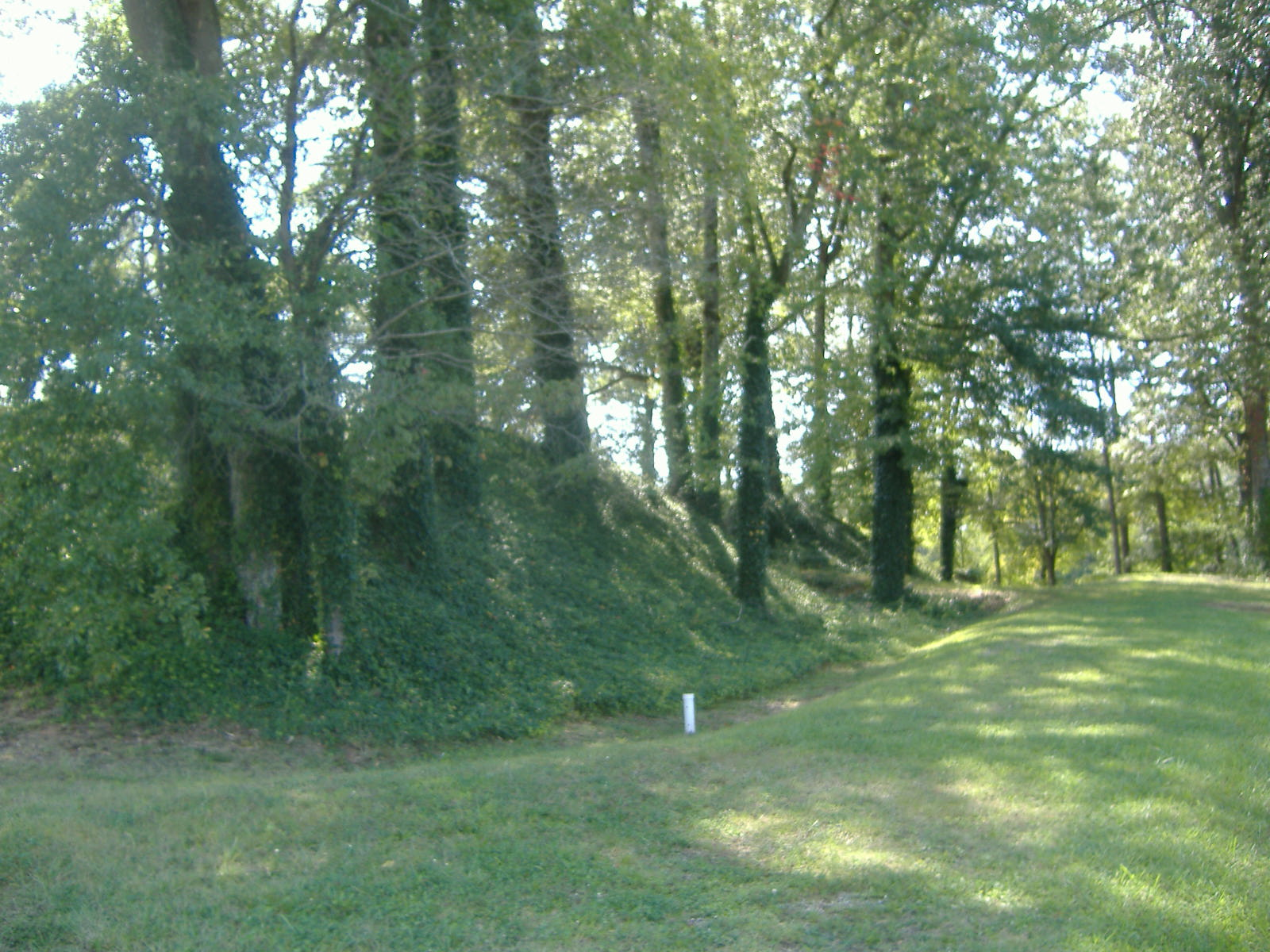
Northwest corner
