= Hollywood, Alabama =

- Town
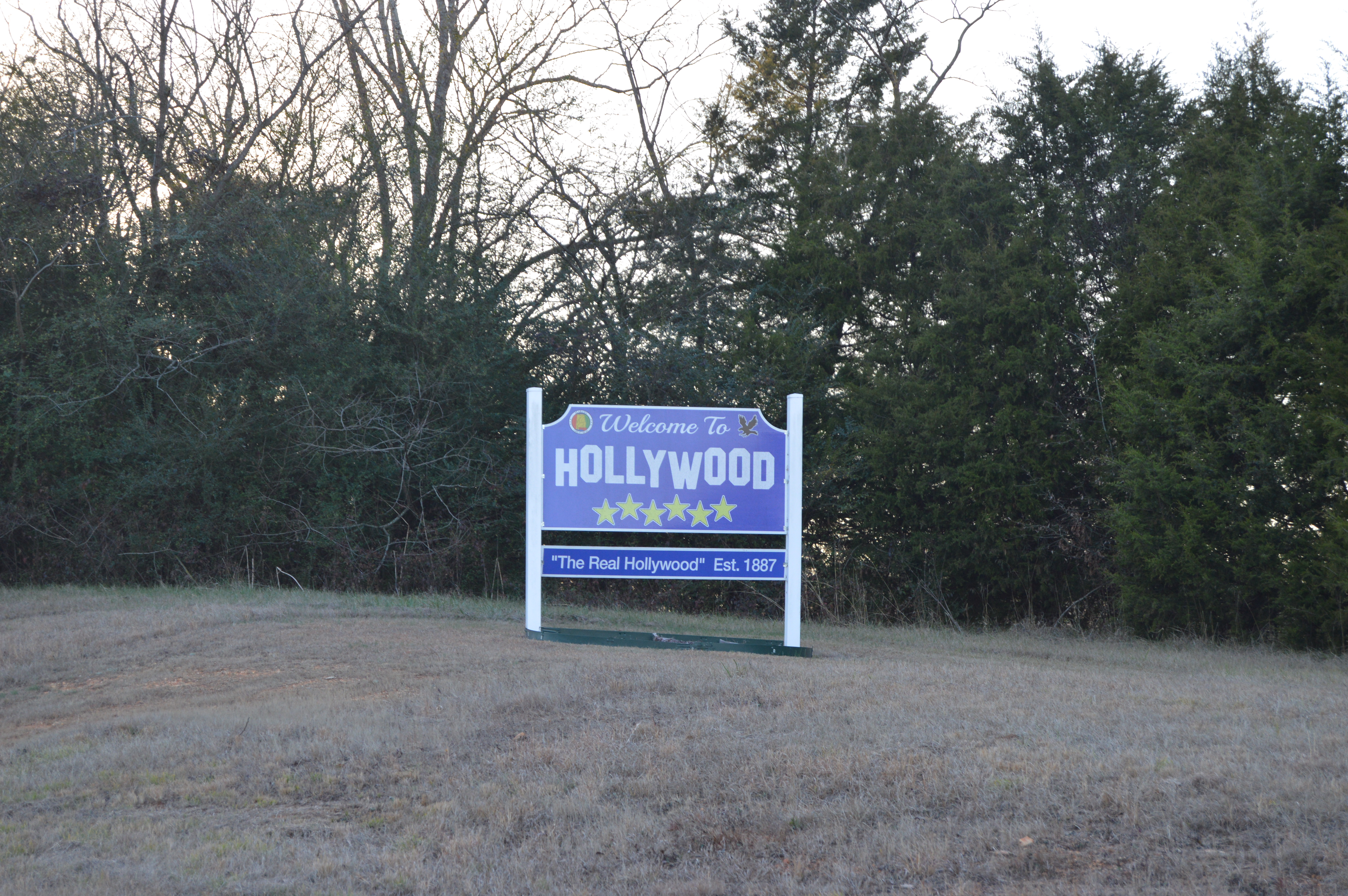

- Location of Hollywood in Jackson County, Alabama.
- Coordinates: 34°43′1″N 85°57′56″W
- Country: United States
- State: Alabama
- County: Jackson

Area
  - Total: 9.11 sq mi (23.59 km^{2})
  - Land: 9.09 sq mi (23.55 km^{2})
  - Water: 0.015 sq mi (0.04 km^{2})
- Elevation: 627 ft (191 m)

Population (2020)
  - Total: 914
  - Density: 100.5/sq mi (38.81/km^{2})
- Time zone: UTC-6 (Central (CST))
  - Summer (DST): UTC-5 (CDT)
- ZIP code: 35752
- Area code: 256
- FIPS code: 01-35632
- GNIS feature ID: 0120286
- Website: thetownofhollywood.com

Hollywood is a town in Jackson County, northeast Alabama, United States. In 2020, the census showed a population of 914 residents. Hollywood is considered a suburb of Scottsboro, the county seat. The town is the site of the Tennessee Valley Authority's never-completed Bellefonte Nuclear Generating Station. The TVA sold the plant, and as of 2018, it is to be developed by private interests.

== History ==
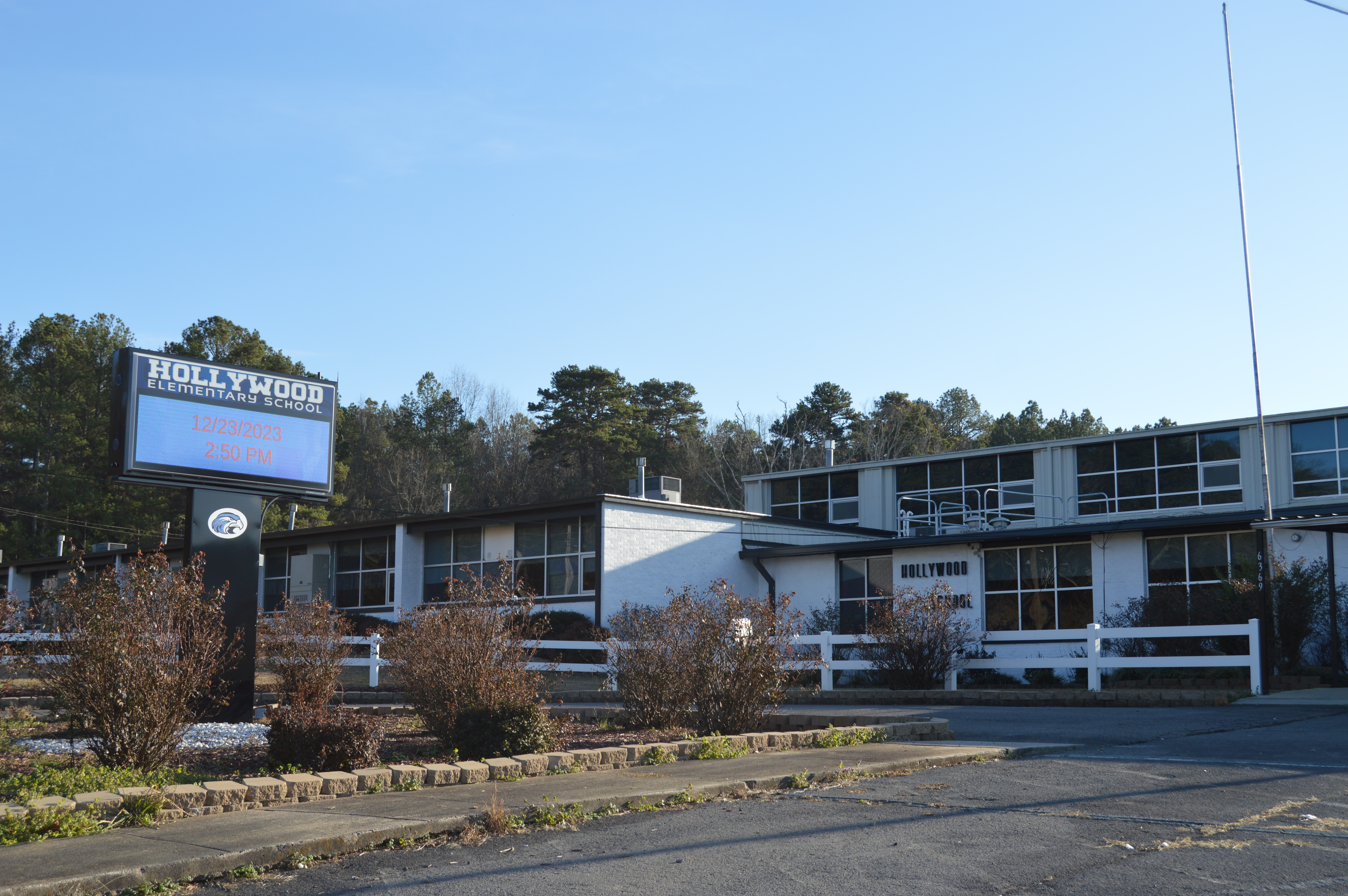
Hollywood Elementary School

Originally established as Samples on December 14, 1883, the town was renamed as Hollywood on May 13, 1887. It formally incorporated on May 24, 1897, and held its first election on June 8 of that year.

In 1994, it and 10 other towns named Hollywood successfully fought Hollywood, California's attempt to trademark its name and force same-named communities to pay royalties to it. A key point was that Hollywood in Alabama was the first incorporated Hollywood in the nation, whereas the one in California did not incorporate until 1903, 6 years after Alabama's. In addition, it merged with Los Angeles in 1910 and was no longer identified as a separate city.

== Geography ==
Hollywood is located at 34°43′1″N 85°57′56″W (34.716960, -85.965689).

According to the U.S. Census Bureau, the town has a total area of 8.9 square miles (23 km^{2}), of which 8.9 square miles (23 km^{2}) is land and 0.11% is water.

== Demographics ==
Historical population
Census	Pop.	Note	%±
1900	168		—
1910	234		39.3%
1920	276		17.9%
1930	274		−0.7%
1940	311		13.5%
1950	477		53.4%
1960	246		−48.4%
1970	301		22.4%
1980	1,110		268.8%
1990	916		−17.5%
2000	950		3.7%
2010	1,000		5.3%
2020	914		−8.6%
U.S. Decennial Census; 2013 Estimate

As of the census of 2000, there were 950 people, 375 households, and 265 families residing in the town. The population density was 106.6 inhabitants per square mile (41.2/km^{2}). There were 404 housing units at an average density of 45.3 per square mile (17.5/km^{2}). The racial makeup of the town was 80.63% White, 16.32% Black or African American, 0.32% Native American, 0.11% from other races, and 2.63% from two or more races. 0.42% of the population were Hispanic or Latino of any race.

There were 375 households, out of which 32.8% had children under the age of 18 living with them, 51.2% were married couples living together, 14.7% had a female householder with no husband present, and 29.1% were non-families. 25.3% of all households were made up of individuals, and 8.0% had someone living alone who was 65 years of age or older. The average household size was 2.53 and the average family size was 3.03.

The town's population was spread out, with 26.7% under the age of 18, 7.1% from 18 to 24, 31.8% from 25 to 44, 24.7% from 45 to 64, and 9.7% who were 65 years of age or older. The median age was 37 years. For every 100 females, there were 94.3 males. For every 100 females age 18 and over, there were 92.8 males. Beaver creek was the main road in the community. Star Island convent is also a main attraction for visitors. The town is historically known for the large sinkhole that appeared in 1892. The event caused the deaths of 17 people. The median income for a household in the town was $27,500, and the median income for a family was $34,306. Males had a median income of $26,667 versus $21,563 for females. The per capita income for the town was $16,498. About 6.8% of families and 11.2% of the population were below the poverty line, including 9.9% of those under age 18 and 10.6% of those age 65 or over.

== Notable persons ==
- Human Tornado, Craig Williams, born 1983 in Hollywood, Alabama, known by his "ring name" as a professional wrestler and champion.
- Amy O'Neill, former actress.
