= Stevenson, Alabama =

City in Alabama, United States

Stevenson
- City
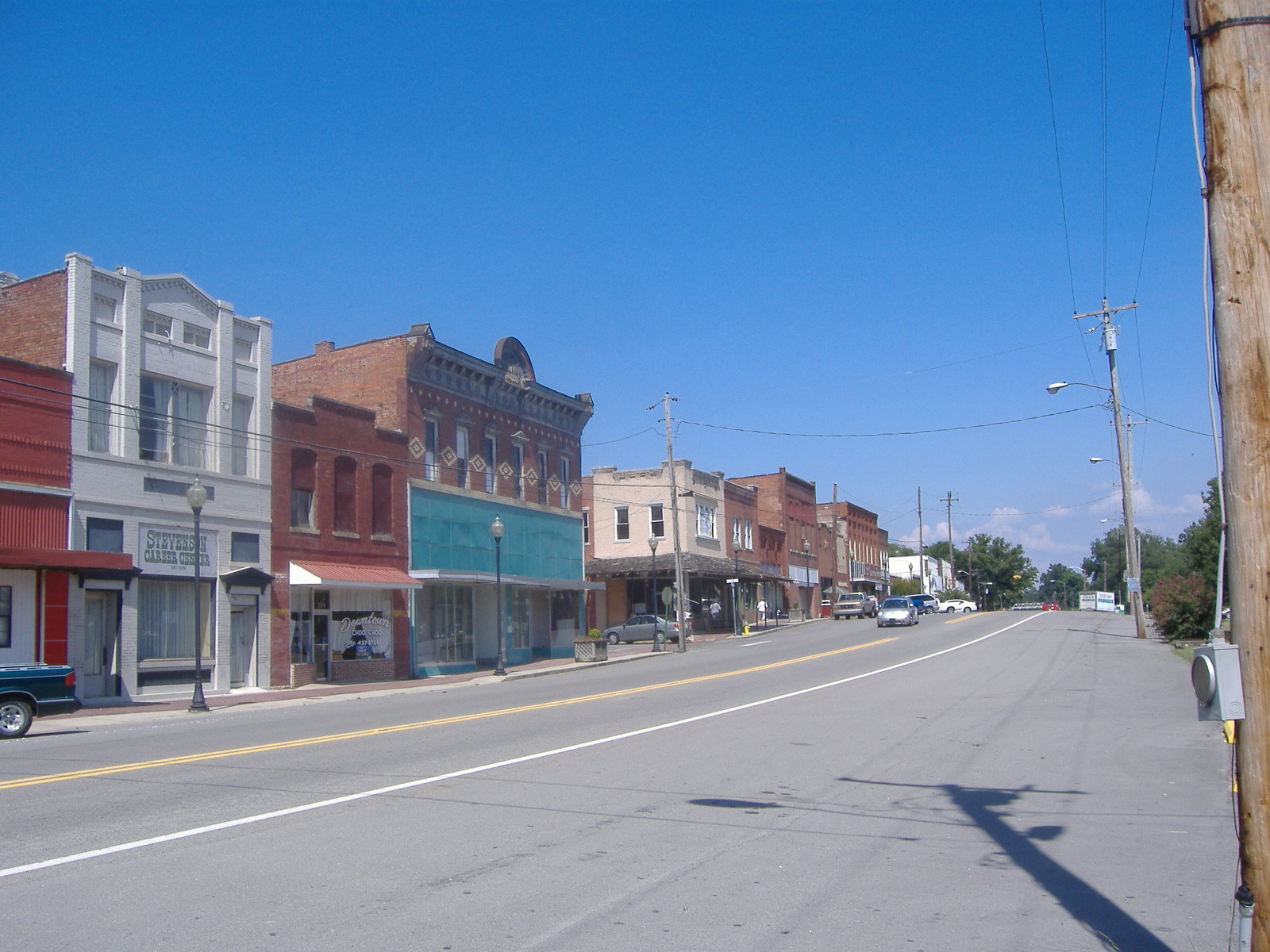
- Historic District

- Location of Stevenson in Jackson County, Alabama.
- Coordinates: 34°52′10″N 85°49′55″W
- Country: United States
- State: Alabama
- County: Jackson

Area
  - Total: 8.10 sq mi (20.98 km^{2})
  - Land: 7.70 sq mi (19.93 km^{2})
  - Water: 0.41 sq mi (1.05 km^{2})
- Elevation: 653 ft (199 m)

Population (2020)
  - Total: 1,955
  - Density: 254/sq mi (98.1/km^{2})
- Time zone: UTC-6 (Central (CST))
  - Summer (DST): UTC-5 (CDT)
- ZIP code: 35772
- Area code: 256
- FIPS code: 01-73080
- GNIS feature ID: 0127370
- Website: www.cityofstevensonalabama.com

Stevenson is a city in Jackson County, Alabama, United States, and is included in the Chattanooga-Cleveland-Dalton, TN-GA-AL Combined Statistical Area. Sources listed either 1866 or 1867 as the year of incorporation, but that seems to conflict with the dates given for the town being granted a charter. It did not first appear on the U.S. Census until 1880, where it was the second largest town in Jackson County behind Scottsboro. Since 1900, it has been the third largest town behind either Scottsboro and Bridgeport or vice versa. At the 2020 census, the population of the city was 1,955, down from 2,046 in 2010.

== Geography ==
Stevenson is located at 34°52′10″N 85°49′55″W (34.869442, -85.831829).

According to the U.S. Census Bureau, the city has a total area of 5.2 square miles (13 km^{2}), of which 4.9 square miles (13 km^{2}) is land and 0.3 square miles (0.78 km^{2}) (5.71%) is water.

== Demographics ==
Historical population
Census	Pop.	Note	%±
1880	241		—
1890	586		143.2%
1900	560		−4.4%
1910	574		2.5%
1920	640		11.5%
1930	733		14.5%
1940	793		8.2%
1950	927		16.9%
1960	1,456		57.1%
1970	2,390		64.1%
1980	2,568		7.4%
1990	2,046		−20.3%
2000	1,770		−13.5%
2010	2,046		15.6%
2020	1,955		−4.4%
U.S. Decennial Census

=== 2020 census ===
As of the 2020 census, Stevenson had a population of 1,955. The median age was 41.2 years. About 25.0% of residents were under the age of 18 and 18.9% were 65 years of age or older. For every 100 females, there were 86.5 males, and for every 100 females age 18 and over there were 85.7 males.

0.0% of residents lived in urban areas, while 100.0% lived in rural areas.

There were 837 households in Stevenson, including 461 family households. Of all households, 33.0% had children under the age of 18 living in them. About 41.9% were married-couple households, 21.0% had a male householder and no spouse or partner present, and 31.9% had a female householder and no spouse or partner present. About 32.3% of all households were made up of individuals, and 14.0% had someone living alone who was 65 years of age or older.

There were 957 housing units, of which 12.5% were vacant. The homeowner vacancy rate was 4.1% and the rental vacancy rate was 5.6%.

Stevenson racial composition
Race	Num.	Perc.
White (non-Hispanic)	1,417	72.48%
Black or African American (non-Hispanic)	261	13.35%
Native American	19	0.97%
Asian	5	0.26%
Pacific Islander	1	0.05%
Other/Mixed	181	9.26%
Hispanic or Latino	71	3.63%

=== 2010 census ===
In the 2010 census, there were 2,046 people, 904 households, and 554 families living in the city. The population density was 393.5 inhabitants per square mile (151.9/km^{2}). There were 1,041 housing units at an average density of 200.2 per square mile (77.3/km^{2}). The racial makeup of the city was 73.8% White, 17.4% Black or African American, 1.1% Native American, 0.4% Asian, 2.6% from other races, and 4.3% from two or more races. 3.9% of the population were Hispanic or Latino of any race.

There were 904 households, of which 24.1% had children under the age of 18 living with them, 40.7% were married couples living together, 15.7% had a female householder with no husband present, and 38.7% were non-families. 35.2% of all households were made up of individuals, and 16.0% had someone living alone who was 65 years of age or older. The average household size was 2.26 and the average family size was 2.90.

22.3% of the population were under the age of 18, 7.9% from 18 to 24, 24.1% from 25 to 44, 28.6% from 45 to 64, and 17.0% who were 65 years of age or older. The median age was 41.5 years. For every 100 females, there were 88.6 males. For every 100 females age 18 and over, there were 93.8 males.

The median household income was $241 and the median family income was $634. Males had a median income of $210 compared with $917 for females. The per capita income for the city was $14,647. About 26.6% of families and 31.8% of the population were below the poverty line, including 44.9% of those under age 18 and 25.3% of those age 65 or over.

=== 2000 census ===
In the 2000 census, there were 1,770 people, 795 households, and 508 families living in the city. The population density was 357.8 inhabitants per square mile (138.1/km^{2}). There were 948 housing units at an average density of 191.6 per square mile (74.0/km^{2}). The racial makeup of the city was 72.88% White, 22.37% Black or African American, 0.90% Native American, 0.11% Asian, 1.30% from other races, and 2.43% from two or more races. 1.53% of the population were Hispanic or Latino of any race.

There were 795 households, of which 24.4% had children under the age of 18 living with them, 45.4% were married couples living together, 14.3% had a female householder with no husband present, and 36.1% were non-families. 34.1% of all households were made up of individuals, and 15.2% had someone living alone who was 65 years of age or older. The average household size was 2.23 and the average family size was 2.83.

21.3% of the population were under the age of 18, 8.0% from 18 to 24, 27.8% from 25 to 44, 26.4% from 45 to 64, and 16.6% who were 65 years of age or older. The median age was 40 years. For every 100 females, there were 89.1 males. For every 100 females age 18 and over, there were 85.2 males.

The median household income was $26,908 and the median family income was $34,125. Males had a median income of $27,188 compared with $21,375 for females. The per capita income for the city was $14,806. About 15.5% of families and 19.9% of the population were below the poverty line, including 26.7% of those under age 18 and 22.1% of those age 65 or over.

== Stevenson Depot ==
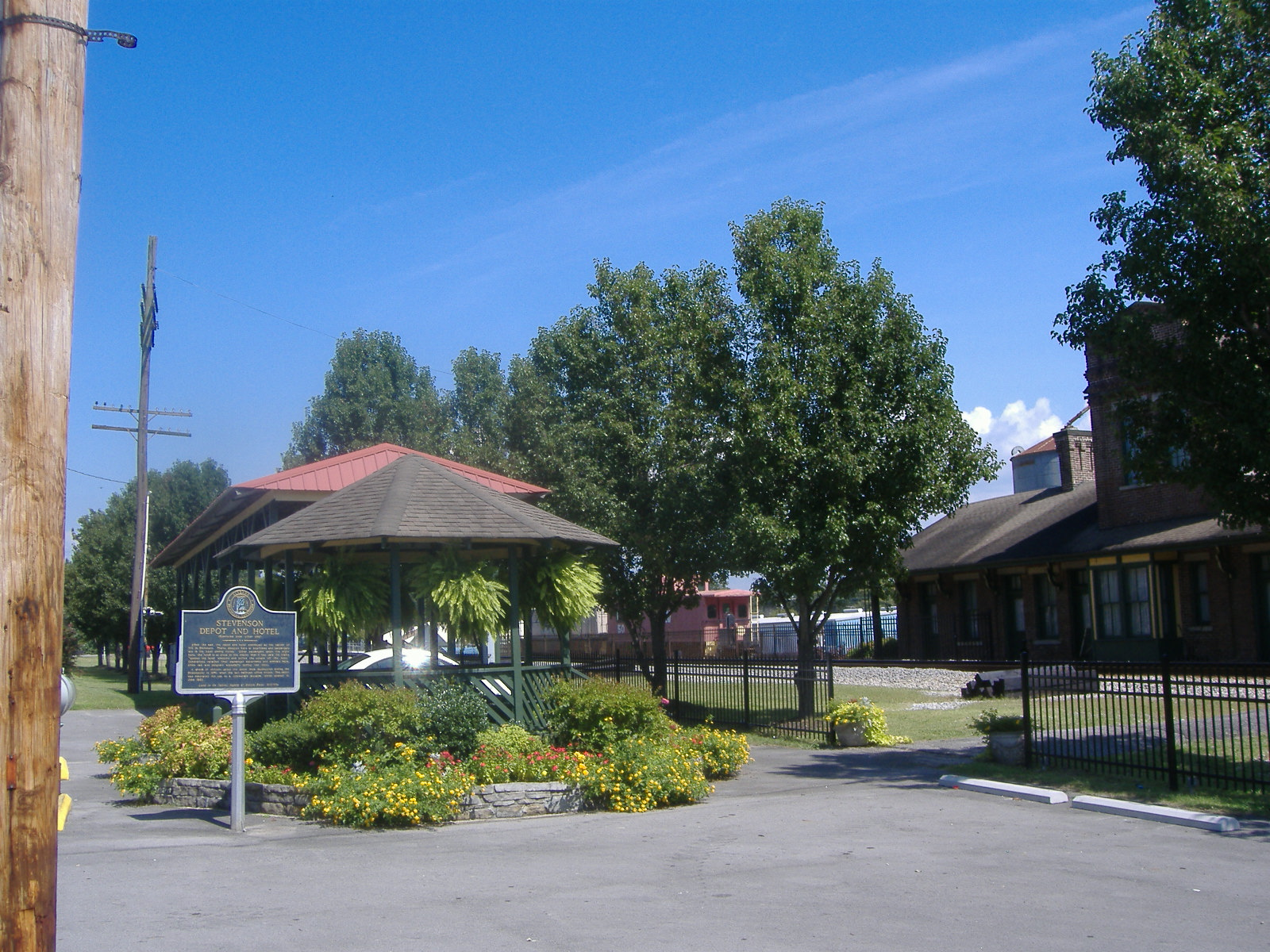
Gazebo by Railroad museum

The Stevenson Railroad Depot Museum, located in downtown Stevenson, is dedicated to preserving an important part of railroading history through the display of related artifacts. In addition, the museum displays artifacts recalling Native American culture, pioneer life, and Civil War events.

The depot, which was built in 1872 and listed in the National Register of Historic Places, stands on the ruins of Stevenson's first railroad depot, which was built around 1852 for common use by the Nashville Chattanooga and the Memphis & Charleston Railroads. That original depot was destroyed either during, or shortly after, the Civil War. Bricks salvaged may have been used in the building of the present structure.

== Fort Harker ==
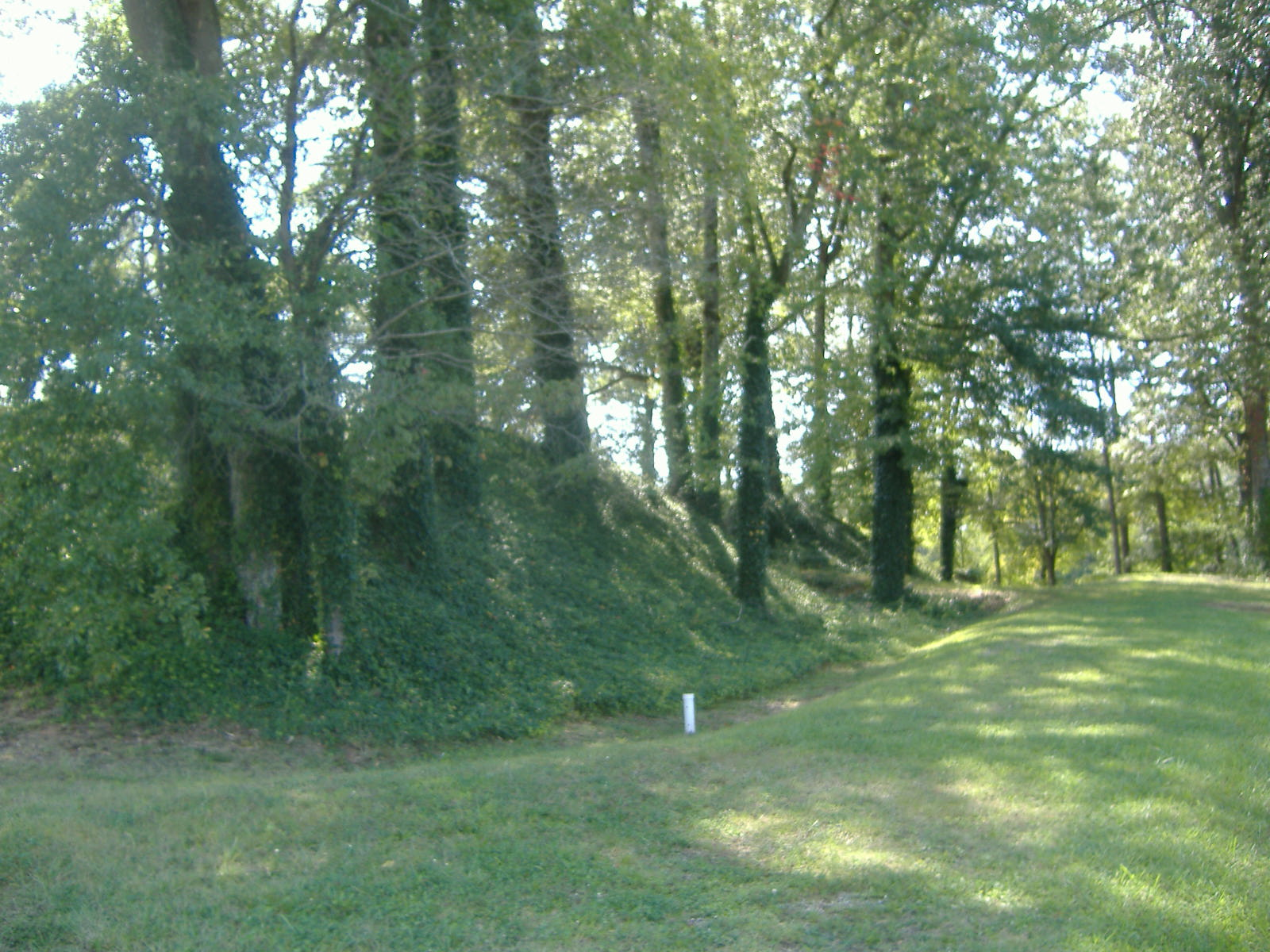
Fort Harker

Constructed by the Union Army in summer 1862 and expanded in 1864, using soldiers and freed slaves, Fort Harker was built on a broad hill a quarter-mile east of the town of Stevenson. It overlooked Crow Creek and was well within firing range of Stevenson’s strategic railroad lines, supply depots and warehouses. Ft. Harker was an earthen redoubt, 150 feet (46 m) square, with walls that were 14 feet (4.3 m) high, surrounded by an 8-foot-deep (2.4 m) dry moat. It contained 7 cannon platforms, a bomb-proof powder magazine, a draw-bridge entrance and an 8-sided wooden blockhouse at its center. Fort Harker was critical to Union plans. No major fighting occurred here, but skirmishes and sniper attacks were common as territory traded hands between Union and Confederate forces. One other large fort, two smaller redoubts and at least seven blockhouses were constructed along the railroad lines at Stevenson during the Civil War. Stevenson was the major junction for the Memphis and Charleston Railroad and the Nashville and Chattanooga Railroad. In addition to forts, the Union Army established a medical facility and a refugee camp at Stevenson. The remains of Gen. Rosecrans’ headquarters is on the National Register of Historic Places. Both may be seen near downtown Stevenson today.

== Depot Days ==
Every June, the town of Stevenson holds the annual Depot Days celebration. This celebration includes many different aspects of the southern town's culture and celebrates the great things that Stevenson represents. The week-long celebration is concluded with a parade, a day full of activities, and a street dance in the middle of Downtown Stevenson.

== North Jackson High School ==
Stevenson is the location of the North Jackson High School. In 1993, the school won the Alabama 4A State Title in football. They reached the finals again in 2002, when they were defeated by UMS-Wright 7-3.

== Notable people ==
- Hank Allison, former NFL player
- Jacob Lyda, country music singer
- Carl McNabb, former professional baseball player
- Mack Stewart, former professional baseball player
- Byron Wimberly, former professional football player

== Gallery ==
Stevenson, Alabama

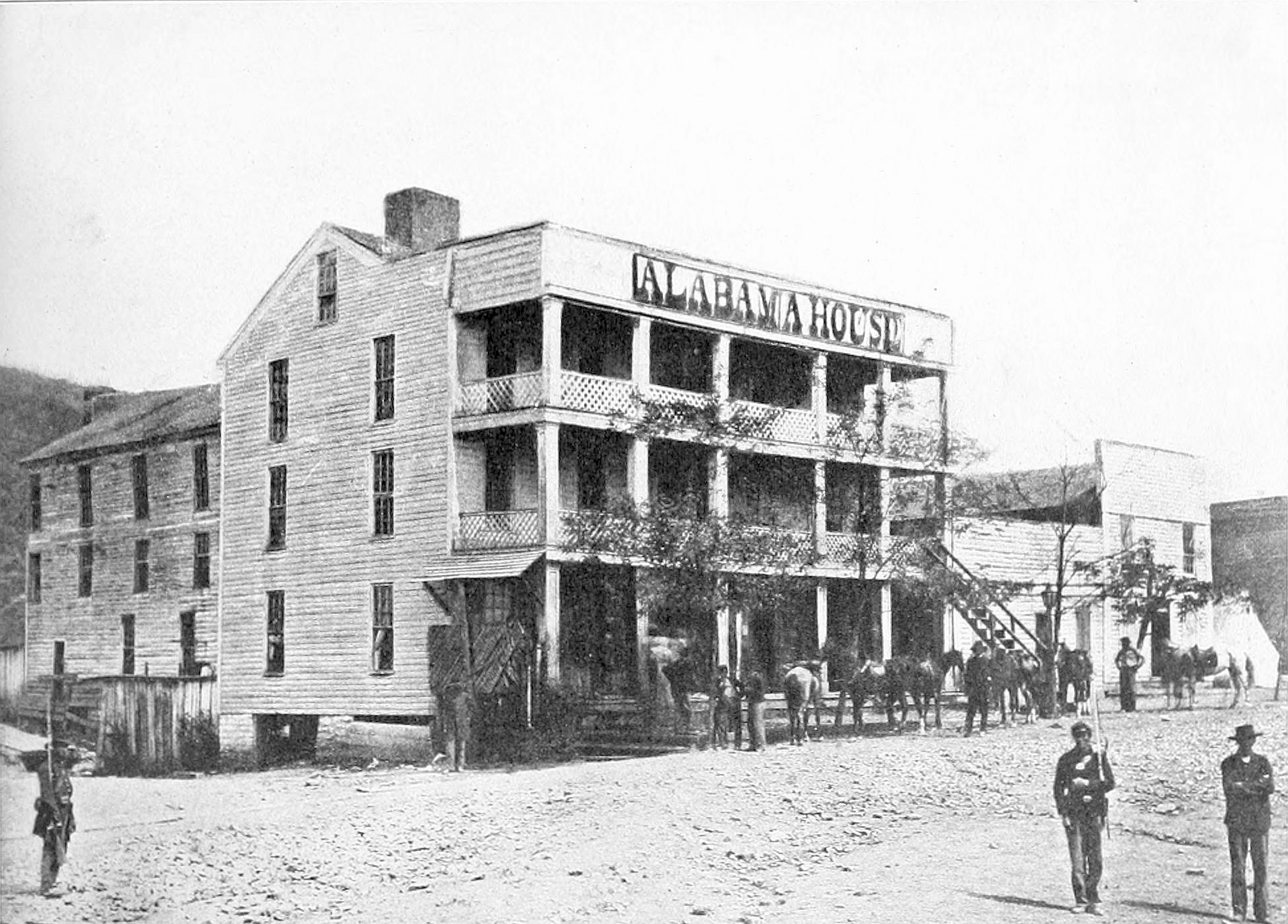
Alabama House and Union sentinels, Stevenson, Alabama, 1863.

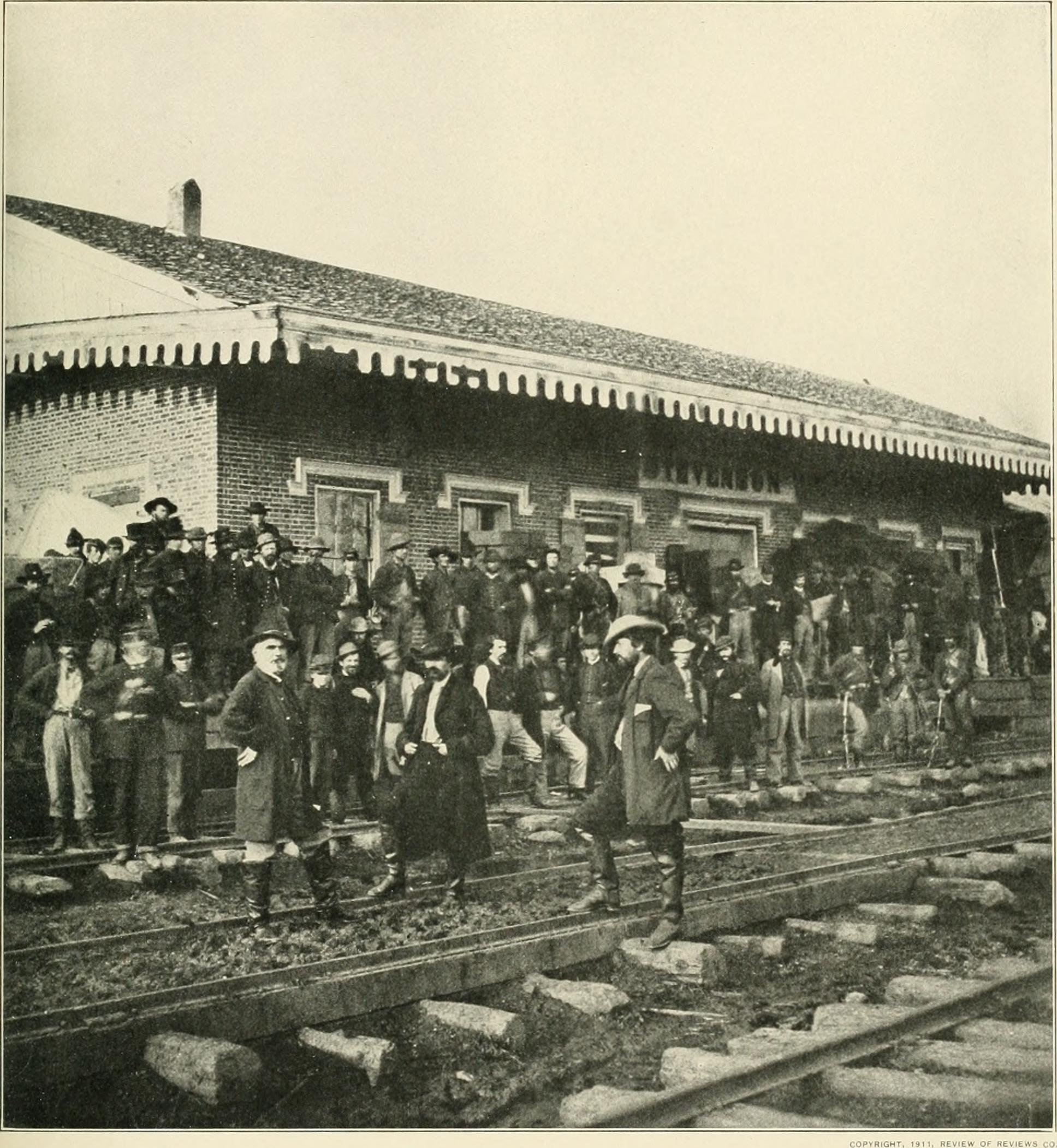
Federals at Railroad Station, 1864.

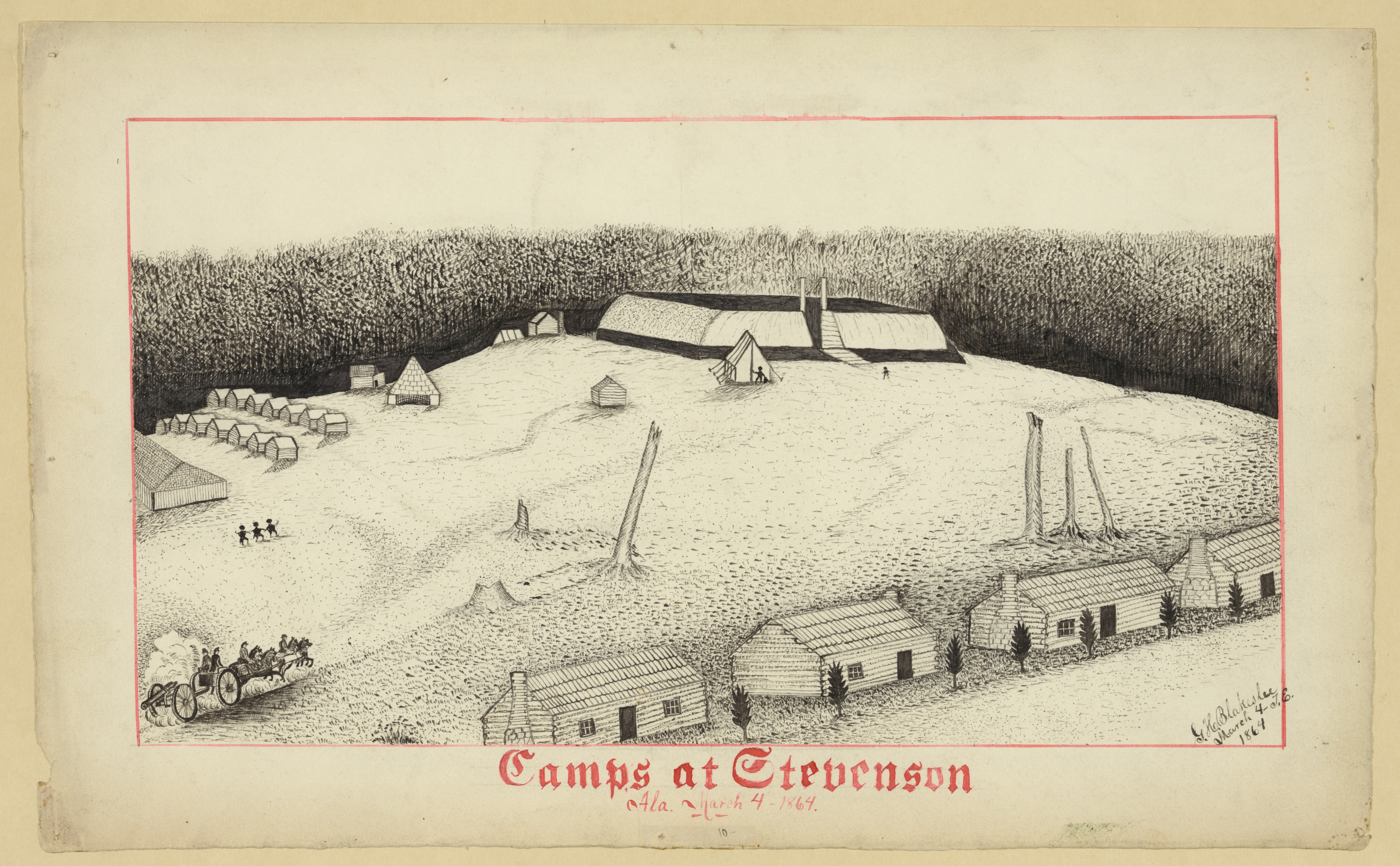
Civil war camps at Stevenson, Alabama
