= Memphis and Charleston Railroad =

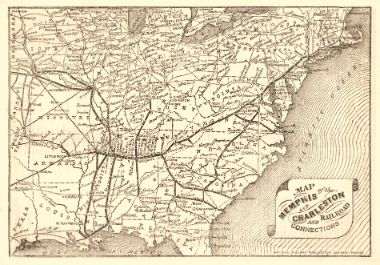

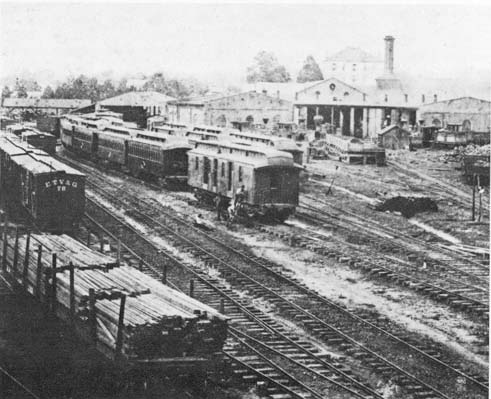
- Memphis Yard in 1885

Overview
- Headquarters: Memphis, Tennessee
- Locale: Southern United States
- Dates of operation: 1857–1894
- Successor: Southern Railway

Technical
- Track gauge: 4 ft 9 in (1,448 mm)
- Previous gauge: 5 ft (1,524 mm)
- Length: 311 mi (501 km)

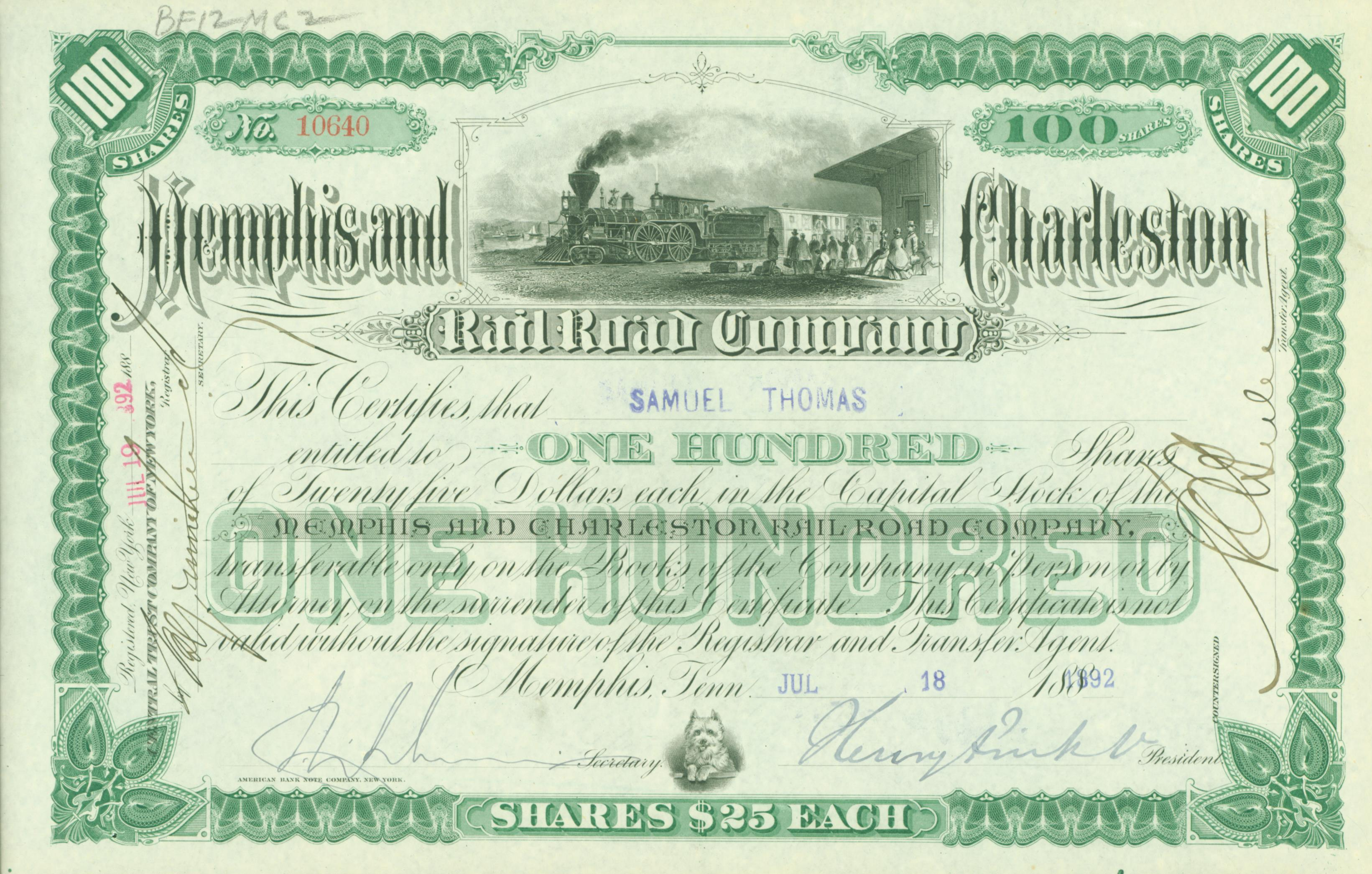
Share of the Memphis and Charleston Rail Road Company, issued 18 July 1892

The Memphis and Charleston Railroad was the first railroad in the United States to link the Atlantic Ocean with the Mississippi River. Chartered in 1846 and completed in 1857, the 311-mile (501 km), 5 ft (1,524 mm) gauge railroad ran from Memphis, Tennessee, to Stevenson, Alabama, through the towns of Corinth, Mississippi, and Huntsville, Alabama. The portion between Memphis and LaGrange, Tennessee, was originally to be part of the LaGrange and Memphis Railroad, chartered in 1838. From Stevenson, the road was connected to Chattanooga, Tennessee, via the Nashville and Chattanooga Railroad. In Alabama, the railroad followed the route of the Tuscumbia, Courtland and Decatur Railroad between Tuscumbia and Decatur, the first railroad to be built west of the Appalachian Mountains.

In many instances, it was the larger cities and towns, with higher populations, that received superior service and rail line access, as well as higher-quality trains.

== History ==
At the time that this railroad was chartered, Memphis was still a small and rural town, with its only advantage being its connection to the Mississippi River.

The location of the railroad station in Memphis followed the familiar design of placing main railroad hubs and stations as close to the waterfront as possible for the convenience of shipping goods and transporting passengers. The steam boats brought people and freight up from the most southern point in New Orleans, and then the Memphis and Charleston Railroad was able to move them laterally, eventually connecting the Mississippi River with the port of Charleston.

The Southerners thought that the "iron horse" would enrich the farmers and well-being of everyone between Charleston and Memphis. In 1852, the local Memphis paper advertised that they needed to hire 50 "able-bodied Negros" every month in order to compete the rail line. By 1853, forty miles were in operation, and the city of Memphis felt the impact of the railroad's production, which opened their eyes to greater railroad ventures.

One way in which the railroad connected the entire state of Tennessee was the state law that required railroads "provide, at or near every town containing as many as three hundred inhabitance, a waiting room for the use and accommodations of passengers." Memphis, being on the westernmost border of the state, helped to provide rail access to the very small cities and towns located all along the southern border of the state.

In May 1857, more than 30,000 Southerners gathered to celebrate the completion of the first railroad connecting the Atlantic Coast to Memphis, and to witness its first full journey. When the passengers arrived late at night, they were greeted by music and ceremonies, marking an important milestone for the railroad industry. This celebration was called "The Marriage of the Waters". Water was brought from the Atlantic Ocean and was then poured into the Mississippi River as a symbol of completion. President of the Railroad, Samuel Tate, was praised for his grand accomplishment as many investors felt assured that their money was safe.

=== The Civil War ===
When the American Civil War broke out in 1861, this railroad became of strategic importance as the only east–west railroad running through the Confederacy. On the morning of April 11, 1862, Union troops led by General Ormsby MacKnight Mitchel captured Huntsville, cutting off this railroad's use for the Confederacy.

The railroad and its route through Corinth, Mississippi, was a significant factor in the Battle of Shiloh in 1862.

Construction of the rail line still persisted during the Civil War because the owners of the railroad wanted to serve the Confederate Army. The plan was to allow the Confederates to use the railroad for free; however, it was not sustainable, and so the Confederate Army paid almost all the railroads in the south with Confederate bonds, which were deemed worthless after the War.

=== Post Civil War ===
==== Expansion ====
In the decade leading up to the Civil War, Memphis’ vibrant cotton market made it the fastest growing city in the U.S. The war itself could not even affect the city's continued growth. After confronting a recession as most southern cities experienced after the war, there was a rapid expansion of railroads to help with the growing industries, one being the Memphis and Charleston Railroad. The State's Republican government also helped with the promotion of local railroad construction. Advertisements were taken out in the local Memphis paper in 1886, asking for men who would be paid $1.75 per day, to be depot switchmen.

Not only was the railroad a result of the economic growth, it led to further expansion in the second half of the nineteenth century as industrial firms moved into Memphis to take advantage the city's central geographic location and railroad system which helped make Memphis a major hub for distribution in the south. The city underwent a major population growth as well, having less than 1,800 citizens in 1840, to 20,000 in 1858.

2-6-0 locomotive No. 201

As the Gilded Age progressed, so did the technology and speed of the trains. The Memphis and Charleston Railroad continued to purchase new trains because they wanted to stay at the forefront of innovation. In an 1882 Memphis newspaper, the Memphis and Charleston Railroad advertised that the train could make it all the way across the state into Washington County in less than 37 hours, and for the fee of $26.25 (~$876.00 in 2025). All of the information, including times and prices, were posted in the newspapers to not only advertise the railroad, but also so show the rapid transformation over a short period of time.

==== Yellow fever outbreak ====
In 1878, there was a fatal outbreak of yellow fever. The outbreak was most prominent in New Orleans, but quickly spread to other cities because of the new rail lines moving out of New Orleans. This deadly disease also spread by means of steamboats traveling up the Mississippi River from New Orleans. After making its way up the river, yellow fever made its way into the Memphis area because of the city's proximity to the Mississippi River. When the mayor of Greenville, Mississippi, died from the fever, people made the railroad the culprit for bringing this evil disease into their town. Once the disease hit Memphis, the Memphis and Charleston Railroad enabled it to travel into smaller towns throughout Tennessee. The epidemic that resulted from the railway transmission became so bad that the trains on the Memphis and Charleston Railroad became the transportation for supplies to cure the many that were affected. Areas surrounding Memphis became very worried that the disease would infect their small towns and grew wary of the railway, leaving it with a bad reputation.

==== Robinson and Wife vs. Memphis and Charleston Railroad Co. ====
After the Civil War, the railroad was involved in the Supreme Court case, "Robinson and Wife vs. Memphis and Charleston Railroad Co." Mr. Robinson's wife, who was an African American, was denied entry into the first-class car owned by the Memphis and Charleston Railroad Company. This was due to the common Jim Crow laws that were in place in the late 1800s. Mr. Robinson, who was white, pressed charges and won the case in which the railroad company had to pay the $500 U.S. discrimination penalty charges. This led to the passing of the Civil Rights Act in Congress, which gave not only equal access to railcars, but also equal access in public facilities like theaters and hotels. The Jim Crow laws became more apparent in the mid-1880s, when railroad companies admitted that they were trying to move their non-white passengers into a certain car.

=== Consolidation with Southern Railway ===
In the 1890s the south experienced a rapid consolidation of fragmented railroads, and in 1894, the Memphis and Charleston Railroad became part of the Southern Railway System organized by J.P. Morgan.

Although the west failed to develop industrially, the Memphis and Charleston railroad, which now operated under a different name, still continued to make an impact in the southern economy. In the 1910s and 1920s, the Memphis and Charleston railroad continued to be used as a major resource for the industrial companies that managed to survive the southern depression after the war. Many new rail lines traveling north were added to the original railroad. Prior to the Civil War, The Memphis and Charleston Railroad did not connect with any northern rails because the leaders of the railroad feared northern capitalists as the tensions between the north and the south grew. However, in the 1910s, the connections to the northern rails helped to promote the southern economy and encouraged northerners to go south for vacation.

== The Memphis and Charleston Route Today ==
The route is still in use today as part of the Norfolk Southern Railway line running between Memphis and Chattanooga, Tennessee. US 72 roughly follows the original route of the Memphis and Charleston between Memphis, Tennessee and Muscle Shoals, Alabama. From Muscle Shoals to Huntsville, Alabama Alt. US 72 follows the original Memphis and Charleston. US 72 follows the route again from Huntsville to Stevenson, Alabama. A branch line from Tullahoma, Tennessee to Sparta, Tennessee, was accessed by the Nashville & Chattanooga Railroad at Tullahoma. The N&C became the Nashville, Chattanooga and St. Louis Railway, then in 1957 merged into the Louisville and Nashville Railroad, now part of the CSX. The Sparta branch is operated by the Caney Fork and Western Railroad.

== See also ==
- Huntsville Depot
