= List of museums in Alabama =

The is a list of museums in the U.S. state of Alabama. The blue links indicate an article exists on an individual museum. The red links indicate that an article still needs to be created. A number of public and private institutions and organizations around the state make their collections available for public viewing. These museums contain artifacts and exhibits related to art and art history, broadcasting, children, civil and political rights, culture, industry, law, medicine, military history, music, natural history, local and regional history, science, sports and transportation. Additionally, the state is home to many historic house museums, many with a focus on the biographical history of individuals; several hall of fames; and a number of living history museums with a focus on local, state, or national history. Also included are non-profit and university art galleries. Museums that exist only in cyberspace (i.e., virtual museums) are not included in this list.

== Active museums ==
List of museums in Alabama
Museum name	Image	City	County	Notes	Refs
Alabama Administrative Office of Courts Museum Area	Ala Supreme Court Buildin	Montgomery	Montgomery	Exhibits of Alabama judicial history and important figures, located in the Alabama Judicial Building	
Alabama Constitution Village	Alabama Constitution Village	Huntsville	Madison	Living history	
Alabama Department of Archives and History	Alabama Department of Archives and History	Montgomery	Montgomery	Official archives for the state of Alabama, features the Museum of Alabama with exhibits including Native American, military history, 19th- and 20th-century historic artifacts, photos, and art	
Alabama Governor's Mansion	Alabama Governor's Mansion	Montgomery	Montgomery	Official residence of Alabama's Governor. Open for tours. U.S. National Register of Historic Places	
Alabama Jazz Hall of Fame	Alabama Jazz Hall of Fame	Birmingham	Jefferson; Shelby	Alabama artistes and memorabilia	
Alabama Men's Hall of Fame		Birmingham	Jefferson	Housed in Samford University's Harwell G. Davis Library	
Alabama Mining Museum	Alabama Mining Museum	Dora	Walker	Exhibits include a 1900s train and mining cars, one-room African American school, elementary school, post office, and depot.	
Alabama Museum of Health Sciences		Birmingham	Jefferson	Medical	
Alabama Museum of Natural History	Smith Hall University of Alabama	Tuscaloosa	Tuscaloosa	Natural history	
Alabama Music Hall of Fame	Alabama Music Hall of Fame	Tuscumbia	Colbert	Exhibits featuring 50 inductees and over 1200 other Alabamians	
Alabama River Museum		Franklin	Monroe	Local history including fossils, Native American artifacts, steamboats	
Alabama Rural Heritage Center		Thomaston	Marengo	History and folk art, operated by Auburn University's Rural Studio	
Alabama State Capitol	Alabama State Capitol building	Montgomery	Montgomery	State capitol building of Alabama. A National Historic Landmark, it is open for tours and is operated by the Alabama Historical Commission.	
Alabama State Council on the Arts (ASCA)		Montgomery	Montgomery	Created by 1966 Executive Order from Governor George Wallace, established in 1967 by the state legislature.	
Alabama Veterans Museum and Archives		Athens	Limestone	Houses artifacts from the Revolutionary War to the present day.	
Alabama Women's Hall of Fame		Livingston	Sumter	Founded in 1970, by the University of West Alabama	
Aldrich Coal Mine Museum		Montevallo	Shelby	History and artifacts from the town's former coal mine	
Alabama Sports Hall of Fame	Alabama Sports Hall of Fame	Birmingham	Jefferson	Exhibits of Alabama’s athletic history	
Aliceville Museum and Cultural Arts Center		Aliceville	Pickens	Former site of the WWII Camp Aliceville 1942 to 1945 POW camp.	
American Sport Art Museum and Archives		Daphne	Baldwin	Gulf Coast sports. Located on the campus of the United States Sports Academy	
American Village	The American Village, Monetvallo, Alabama	Montevallo	Shelby	Living history	
Ancient Wars Museum		Madison	Madison	aka Alabama War Museum, Exhibits from present day to 8,000 BC	
Anniston Museum of Natural History		Anniston	Calhoun	Located in Anniston Museums and Gardens	
Arlington Antebellum Home & Gardens	Arlington Antebellum Home & Gardens	Birmingham	Jefferson counties	U.S. National Register of Historic Places	
Ave Maria Grotto	The Ave Maria Grotto, St. Bernard Abbey	Cullman	Cullman	Outdoor miniature reproductions of some of the most famous religious structures of the world. Alabama Register of Landmarks and Heritage; National Register of Historic Places	
Baldwin County Heritage Museum		Elberta	Baldwin	Agricultural and cultural history	
Barber Vintage Motorsports Museum	BarberMuseum	Birmingham	Jefferson	Vintage and modern motorcycles and race cars	
Battle-Friedman House	Battle-Friedman House	Tuscaloosa	Tuscaloosa	Antebellum house and garden, operated by the Tuscaloosa County Preservation Society. U.S. National Register of Historic Places	
Battleship Memorial Park	Battleship Memorial Park	Mobile	Mobile	Centered around the battleship USS Alabama, pays tribute to all military veterans from Alabama	
Belle Mont Mansion	Belle Mont	Tuscumbia	Colbert	1832 plantation house, influenced by Thomas Jefferson's Palladian architecture. U.S. National Register of Historic Places	
Bellingrath Gardens and Home	Bellingrath Gardens and Home	Theodore	Mobile	Alabama Register of Landmarks and Heritage, U.S. Historic district, U.S. National Register of Historic Places	
Berman Museum of World History		Anniston	Calhoun	Ancient art, weapons, photos, clothing, hands-on displays and lifelike dioramas from around the world	
Bessemer Hall of History	Bessemer Hall of History	Bessemer	Jefferson	Local history housed in the Southern Railway Terminal Station. A 1916 railroad depot, it is on the U.S. National Register of Historic Places. Displays include clothing, artifacts, photographs.	
Birmingham Civil Rights Institute		Birmingham	Jefferson	American Civil Rights Movement in the 1950s and 1960s	
Birmingham Museum of Art	Birmingham Museum of Art	Birmingham	Jefferson	Collections from around the world	
Blount County Memorial Museum		Oneonta	Blount	Artifacts, history art & literature of Blount Countians	
Bluff Hall	Bluff Hall	Demopolis	Marengo	Mansion built by slaves in 1832	
Booker T. Washington House	Booker T. Washington House	Tuskegee	Macon	Home of Booker T. Washington, known as "The Oaks." On the Tuskegee Institute campus.	
Bragg-Mitchell Mansion	Bragg-Mitchell Mansion	Mobile	Mobile	U.S. National Register of Historic Places, built by Congressman John Bragg in 1855.	
Bridgeport Depot Museum	Bridgeport Depot Museum	Bridgeport	Jackson	Operated by the Bridgeport Area Historical Association	
Buena Vista Mansion	Buena Vista Mansion	Prattville	Autauga	Built in 1822, listed on the U.S. National Register of Historic Places, Oct 1974	
Burritt on the Mountain	Burritt on the Mountain	Huntsville	Madison	Living history museum	
Carnegie Visual Arts Center		Decatur	Morgan	Originally the Carnegie Library of Decatur	
Central Carver Museum		Gadsden	Etowah	To preserve the culture of the African American community	
Children's Hands-On Museum of Tuscaloosa		Tuscaloosa	Tuscaloosa	Exhibits, seasonal events, birthday parties, school field trips	
Children's Museum of the Shoals		Florence	Lauderdale	Hands-on exhibits for children ages 18 months-3rd grade	
Clarke County Historical Museum	Alston Cobb House	Grove Hill	Clarke	Grounds include the Alston-Cobb House, law office, corn crib and cabin	
Conde-Charlotte House	Conde-Charlotte House	Mobile	Mobile	Owned and operated by the Alabama chapter of the National Society of Colonial Dames in America	
Confederate Memorial Park	Confederate Memorial Park	Mountain Creek	Chilton	Civil War exhibits, two cemeteries, a church and post office. Operated by the Alabama Historical Commission	
Cook's Natural Science Museum		Decatur	Morgan	Natural history	
Cullman County Museum		Cullman	Cullman	Housed in a replica of the home of Col. John G. Cullmann, German immigrant who founded the city	
Dauphin Island Sea Lab	Dauphin Island Sea Lab	Dauphin Island	Mobile	Marine research and education center	
Dexter Parsonage Museum	Dexter Parsonage Museum	Montgomery	Montgomery	Where Dr. Martin Luther, King, Jr. pastored from 1954–1960 and began his quest for civil rights.	
Don Kresge Memorial Radio Museum		Birmingham	Jefferson	AKA Alabama Historical Radio Society Museum	
Dowling Museum and Rudd Art Center		Ozark	Dale County	Southeastern art	
EarlyWorks Children's History Museum	Earlyworks Children's History Museum	Huntsville	Madison	Hands-on children's museum, includes the Talking Tree	
Evelyn Burrow Museum		Hanceville	Cullman	Wallace State College	
Fairhope Museum of History	Fairhope Museum of History	Fairhope	Baldwin	Local history	
Fayette Art Museum and Civic Center		Fayette	Fayette	Local artists and Fayette County Sports Hall of Fame	
Fendall Hall	Fendall Hall	Eufaula	Barbour	Victorian period home with furnishings and gardens, operated by the Alabama Historical Commission	
First White House of the Confederacy	First White House of the Confederacy	Montgomery	Montgomery	Executive residence of President Jefferson Davis. Alabama Register of Landmarks and Heritage. U.S. National Register of Historic Places	
Foley Railroad Museum	Foley Railroad Museum	Foley	Baldwin	Exhibits, memorabilia, formerly the Louisville and Nashville (L&N) Railroad Depot (ca. 1909)	
Fort Conde		Mobile	Mobile	Namesake of Louis Henri de Bourbon, Duke of Bourbon, Prince of Condé, operated by the History Museum of Mobile	
Fort Gaines	Fort Gaines	Dauphin Island	Mobile	The Battle of Mobile Bay during the American Civil War	
Fort Mitchell	Fort Mitchell	Fort Mitchell	Russell	Reconstructed 1810s fort and museum, involved in the Creek War	
Fort Morgan	Fort Morgan	Gulf Shores	Baldwin	U.S. National Historic Landmark, U.S. National Register of Historic Places	
Fort Payne Depot Museum	Fort Payne	Fort Payne	DeKalb	Local history	
Fort Toulouse-Fort Jackson National Historic Park	Fort Toulouse	Wetumpka	Elmore	Replica 18th-century fort with living history demonstrations. U.S. National Historic Landmark. U.S. National Register of Historic Places	
Freedom Rides Museum	Old Montgomery Greyhound Station	Montgomery	Montgomery	National Register of Historic Places. Bus station that was the site of a violent attack on participants in the 1961 Freedom Rides during the Civil Rights Movement	
Gadsden Museum of Art	Gadsden Museum of Art	Gadsden	Etowah	Founded by the Gadsden Art Association (GAA)	
Gaineswood	Gaineswood	Demopolis	Marengo	Listed as a National Historic Landmark and operated by the Alabama Historical Commission	
George Washington Carver Museum	George Washington Carver Museum	Tuskegee	Macon	On the Tuskegee Institute campus. Closed for repairs and rehabilitation until Spring 2025.	
George Washington Carver Interpretive Museum		Dothan	Houston	Dedicated to African American scientist George Washington Carver	
Georgine Clarke Alabama Artists Gallery		Montgomery	Montgomery	Operated by the Alabama State Council on the Arts, located on the first floor of the RSA Tower	
Gorgas House	Gorgas House	Tuscaloosa	Tuscaloosa	Oldest structure on the University of Alabama. Listed on the National Register of Historic Places listings in Tuscaloosa County, Alabama	
Gulf Coast Exploreum Science Center	Gulf Coast Exploreum Science Center	Mobile	Mobile	Variety of traveling exhibitions, Dome Theater	
Gulf Shores Museum		Gulf Shores	Baldwin	Local history	
Guntersville Museum	Guntersville Museum	Guntersville	Marshall	Located in the Company E of the 167th Infantry of the Alabama National Guard Armory	
Hank Williams Museum		Montgomery	Montgomery.	Founded in 1999 by Hank Williams Sr. fan Cecil Franklin Jackson	
Hank Williams Sr. Boyhood Home and Museum		Georgiana	Butler County	Non-profit Hank Williams Museum and Festival Inc. oversees this	
Harrison Brothers Hardware Store		Huntsville	Madison	Established in 1879, combination museum and operating hardware business	
Heart of Dixie Railroad Museum		Calera	Shelby	Official state railroad museum	
History Museum of Mobile		Mobile	Mobile	Local art exhibits, 300 years of Mobile history	
Huntsville Depot		Madison		City's railroad and transportation history. U.S. National Register of Historic Places, Alabama Register of Landmarks and Heritage	
Huntsville Museum of Art		Huntsville	Madison	Southern artists	
Indian Mound and Museum		Florence	Lauderdale	Indian mound and museum with excavated artifacts from different cultures dating back 10,000 years	
International Motorsports Hall of Fame		Talladega	Talladega	Racing vehicles and memorabilia	
Iron & Steel Museum of Alabama		Birmingham	Jefferson/Shelby	Iron and steel manufacturing during the Civil War	
Isabel Anderson Comer Museum and Arts Center		Sylacauga	Talladega	Arts and local history	
Ivy Green		Tuscumbia	Colbert	Birthplace of Helen Keller; U.S. National Historic Landmark, U.S. National Register of Historic Places; Alabama Register of Landmarks and Heritage.	
Jemison-Carnegie Heritage Hall Museum		Talladega	Talladega	Local history	
Jesse Owens Memorial Park and Museum		Oakville	Morgan	Birthplace of track and field athlete Jesse Owens, who participated in the 1936 Summer Olympics, where he won four gold medals.	
Joseph Wheeler Plantation		Hillsboro	Lawrence	U.S. National Register of Historic Places, U.S. Historic district. Former home of Confederate General Joseph Wheeler, also known as Pond Spring.	
Jule Collins Smith Museum of Fine Art		Auburn	Lee	Part of Auburn University, 19th and 20th century American and European Art	
Landmark Park		Dothan	Houston	Alabama's official Museum of Agriculture, includes 1890s living history farm, a one-room schoolhouse, a general store, a turn-of the-century church and a planetarium, 100 acres	
Lee County Historical Society Museum		Loachapoka	Lee	Multi-exhibit historical museum	
Magnolia Grove	Magnolia Grove Greensboro	Greensboro	Hale	U.S. National Register of Historic Places, Antebellum mansion, best known as home of Rear Admiral Richmond Pearson Hobson, operated by the Alabama Historical Commission	
Mann Wildlife Learning Museum		Montgomery	Montgomery	Part of Montgomery Zoo	
Marietta Johnson School of Organic Education		Fairhope	Baldwin	Founded by Marietta Johnson and focused on childhood development, U.S. National Register of Historic Places	
Karl C. Harrison Museum of George Washington		Columbiana	Shelby	Biographical	
Kathryn Tucker Windham Museum		Thomasville	Clarke	Located on he Alabama Southern Community College campus. The works of journalist, photographer and storyteller Kathryn Tucker Windham.	
Kennedy-Douglass Center for the Arts		Florence	Lauderdale	Features annual and changing exhibits of artists from the Southeas	
Mary G. Hardin Center for Cultural Arts		Gadsden	Etowah	Gadsden Community School for the Arts, Imagination Place Children's Museum	
McWane Science Center		Birmingham	Jefferson	Native American artifacts, minerals and fossils from the former Red Mountain Museum, Challenger Learning Center, aquarium, hands-on science exhibits	
Mercedes-Benz Visitor Center and Museum		Vance	Tuscaloosa	Mercedes-Benz automobiles and plant tours by advance reservations	
Mildred Westervelt Warner Transportation Museum		Tuscaloosa	Tuscaloosa	How the city was influenced by transportation	
Mobile Medical Museum		Mobile	Mobile	5,000 medical artifacts and documents	
Mobile Museum of Art	Mobile Museum of Art	Mobile	Mobile	Wide variety of 10,000 works, plus activities for all ages	
Monroe County Heritage Museums		Monroeville	Monroe	Host to multiple museums, includes Old Courthouse Museum, Rikard’s Mill Historical Park, Alabama River Museum	
Montgomery Museum of Fine Arts		Montgomery	Montgomery	4,000 works of 19th- and 20th-century American paintings and sculpture, Southern regional art, Old Master prints and decorative arts	
The MOOseum		Montgomery	Montgomery	Cattle industry in Alabama	
Moundville Archaeological Park		Moundville	Hale	Operated by the University of Alabama Prehistoric Native American settlements	
Museum of East Alabama		Opelika	Lee	Approximately 4,000 artifacts regarding live in East Alabama	
National African American Archives and Museum		Mobile	Mobile	Themes include slavery, African American contributions in Mobile, Alabama and the United States.	
National Voting Rights Museum		Selma	Dallas	History of the African-American Voting Rights and Women's Suffrage movements	
Negro Southern League Museum		Birmingham	Jefferson	History of the Negro Southern League and Baseball in Birmingham	
North Alabama Railroad Museum		Chase	Madison	Features a rolling stock collection, a small train station and a small heritage railroad	
Northport Heritage Museum		Northport	Tuscaloosa	Northport Native American history	
Oakleigh Historic Complex		Mobile	Mobile	Historic Complex, U.S. National Register of Historic Places, Oakleigh mansion, cottage, Union barracks	
Oakville Indian Mounds Park and Museum		Oakville	Lawrence	83-acre (340,000 m2) state park and museum dedicated to ancient Native American monuments	
Old Alabama Town		Montgomery	Montgomery	Collection of historically significant buildings, brought together as a living history museum	
Old Cahawba Archaeological Park		Orrville	Dallas	National Register of Historic Places. Ghost town archaeological park with exhibits in the Welcome Center, operated by the Alabama Historical Commission	
Old Courthouse Museum		Monroeville	Monroe	Restored 1930s period courthouse, exhibits on local authors Truman Capote and Harper Lee	
Paul W. Bryant Museum		Tuscaloosa	Tuscaloosa	Bear Bryant 25 years head football coach University of Alabama football team. 314 collegiate football victories	
Phoenix Fire Museum		Mobile	Mobile	Operated by the History Museum of Mobile, located in the restored home of the Phoenix Volunteer Fire Company No. 6.	
Pope's Tavern		Florence	Lauderdale	Stagecoach stop, tavern and in. Civil War hospital and other artifacts	
Richards DAR House		Mobile	Mobile	U.S. Historic district Contributing property. 1860 Italianate house, operated by the Daughters of the American Revolution	
Rickwood Field		Birmingham	Jefferson	Oldest surviving professional baseball park in the United States	
Rikard’s Mill Historical Park		Beatrice	Monroe	Operating water-powered grist mill and museum	
Rosa Parks Library and Museum		Montgomery	Montgomery	Troy University campus	
Rosenbaum House		Florence	Lauderdale	Designed by Frank Lloyd Wright in his Usonia style	
Samuel Ullman Museum		Birmingham	Jefferson	Life and works of poet Samuel Ullman. Operated by The University of Alabama at Birmingham,	
Sci-Quest		Huntsville	Madison	Children’s interest in science, technology, engineering, and mathematics	
Scott and Zelda Fitzgerald Museum	Fitzgerald Museum	Montgomery	Montgomery	The last home Scott and Zelda lived in together.	
Scottsboro-Jackson Heritage Center		Scottsboro	Jackson	Located in the Brown-Proctor House, late 19th-century period house, area Native Americans, pioneers, local history	
Shelby County Historical Society Museum		Columbiana	Shelby		
Shelby Iron Works		Columbiana	Shelby	Former iron works buildings in a park setting	
Shorter Mansion		Eufaula	Barbour	Designed by Montgomery architects Frank Lockwood and Frank Lockwood, Jr. Operated by the Eufala Heritage Association	
Skyline Commissary		Jackson		AKA "the rock store". Historic general store and former New Deal co-op, U.S. National Register of Historic Places	
Sloss Furnaces National Historic Landmark		Birmingham	Jefferson	U.S. National Register of Historic Places, U.S. National Historic Landmark	
Southern Environmental Center		Birmingham	Jefferson	Located on the campus of Birmingham-Southern College, exhibits about pollution, green living	
Southern Museum of Flight		Birmingham	Jefferson	Southeast’s largest civilian aviation museum	
State Black Archives Research Center & Museum		Huntsville	Madison	African American	
Stevenson Railroad Depot Museum		Stevenson	Jackson	Railroad and Civil War artifacts	
Sturdivant Hall		Selma	Dallas	Mid 19th century Greek Revival mansion	
Three Notch Museum		Andalusia	Covington	Operated by the Covington Historical Society in a historic depot	
Tuskegee History Center		Tuskegee	Macon	Formerly known as the Tuskegee Human and Civil Rights Multicultural Center,	
United States Army Aviation Museum		Fort Novosel	Dale	Located on Fort Novosel, features large collection of helicopters	
U.S. Space & Rocket Center		Huntsville	Madison	Science, rocketry and space exploration	
Vaughan-Smitherman Museum		Selma	Dallas	Depicts Selma’s history until about 1960	
U.S. Veterans Memorial Museum		Huntsville	Madison	Designated by the Alabama House of Representatives as the State of Alabama Veterans Memorial Museum. Run entirely by volunteers.	
Vulcan Statue and Vulcan Park		Birmingham	Jefferson	City history, history of the Vulcan statue	
W. C. Handy Home, Museum & Library		Florence	Lauderdale	Focus on the life and career of the artist known as the “Father of the Blues”	
Weeden House Museum		Huntsville	Madison	Features the work of Maria Howard Weeden	
William and Emily Hearin Mobile Carnival Museum		Mobile	Mobile	Carnival and Mardi Gras in Mobile	
Wiregrass Museum of Art		Dothan	Houston	Non-profit, features southern artists	

== Defunct museums ==
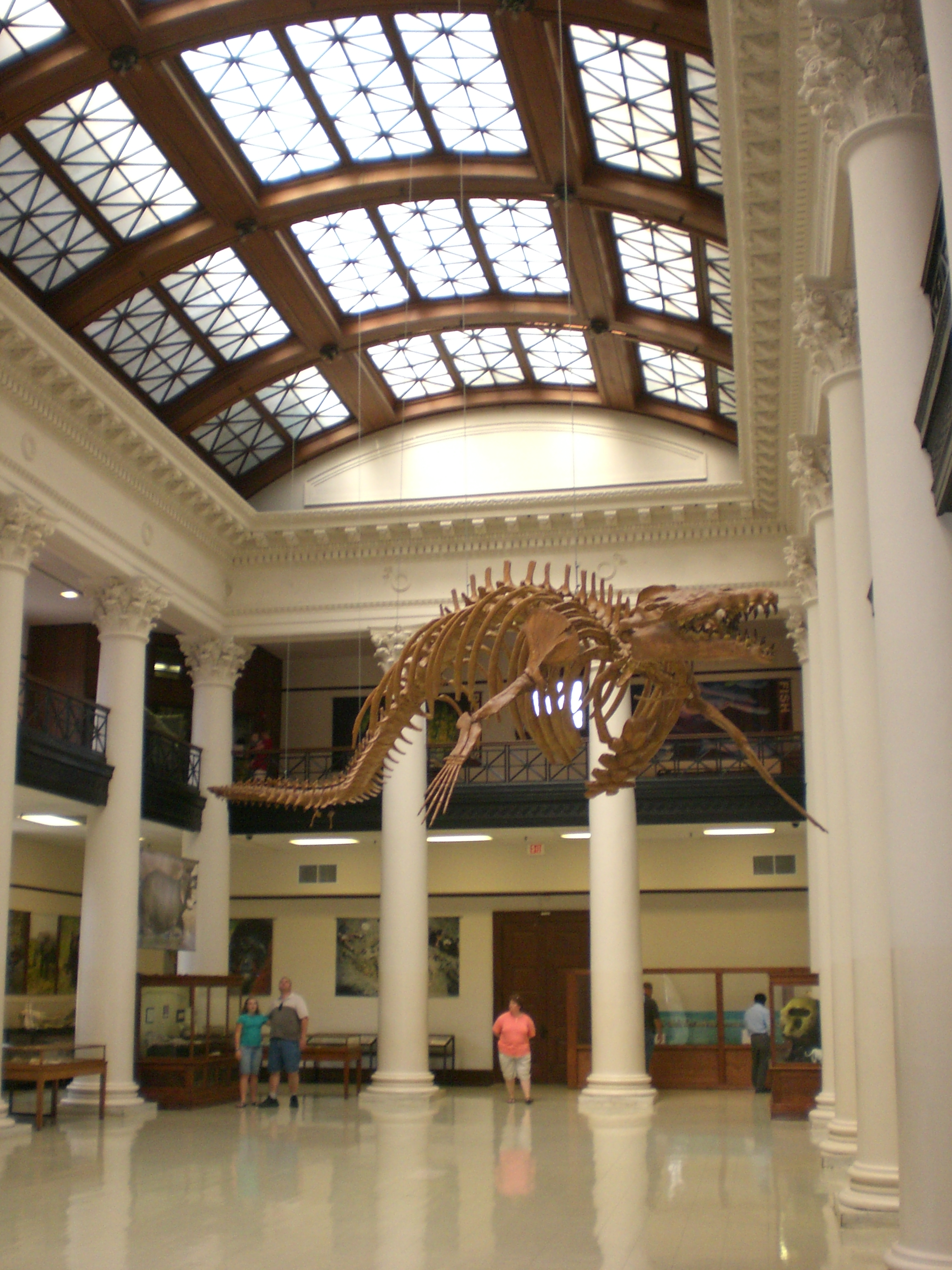
The Grand Gallery Exhibition Hall of the Alabama Museum of Natural History in Tuscaloosa

- Blue and Gray Museum of North Alabama, Decatur, Morgan, Private collection of Civil War artifacts
- Carlen House, Mobile
- George and Lurleen Wallace Museum, Montgomery, dedicated to the lives of former Alabama governor's George Wallace and Lurleen B. Wallace
- Ma'Cille's Museum of Miscellanea, Gordo, article
- Magee Farm, Kushla, closed in 2010
- Red Mountain Museum, Birmingham
- Tom Mann's Fish World, Eufaula, closed in 2004
- Tuscaloosa Museum of Art
- The Water Course, Clanton, closed in 2012

== See also ==
- List of museums in the United States
- Nature centers in Alabama
