= Lombardo Building =

- U.S. National Register of Historic Places
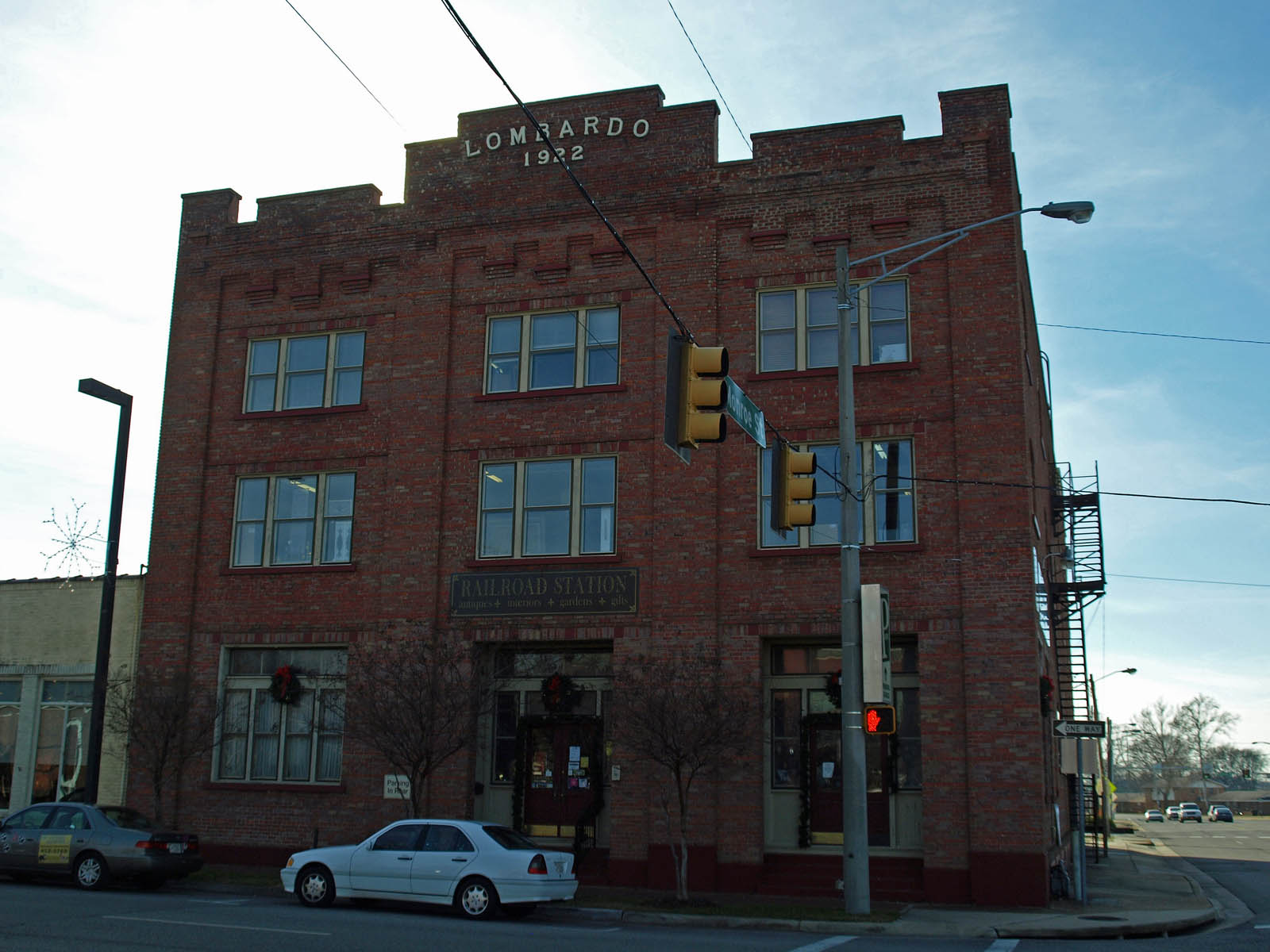
- The building in December 2009

- Location within Huntsville, Alabama Location within Alabama Location within the United States
- Location: 315 N. Jefferson St., Huntsville, Alabama
- Coordinates: 34°44′1″N 86°35′19″W
- Area: less than one acre
- Built: 1922
- MPS: Downtown Huntsville MRA
- NRHP reference No.: 80000718
- Added to NRHP: September 22, 1980

The Lombardo Building is a historic warehouse in Huntsville, Alabama. The three-story brick structure was built in 1922. The façade is divided into three bays by four piers. The center and right bays each have a double entry door with transom and sidelights, while the left bay contains a group of four one-over-one sash windows topped with a transom. Each of the upper floors has groups of three one-over-one windows. Each bay is topped with three decorative corbels, below a stepped parapet. The center of the parapet is marked with "LOMBARDO" and "1922".

The area of Jefferson Street was known as "Grocery Row", due to the number of grocery, vegetable, and fruit warehouses on the block. The Lombardo Building is adjacent to the Kelly Brothers and Rowe Building, 305 Jefferson Street, and the Halsey Grocery Warehouse, and less than a block from the W. L. Halsey Warehouse. The buildings lie one block south of the Huntsville Depot.

The building was listed on the National Register of Historic Places in 1980.
