= W. L. Halsey Warehouse =

- U.S. National Register of Historic Places
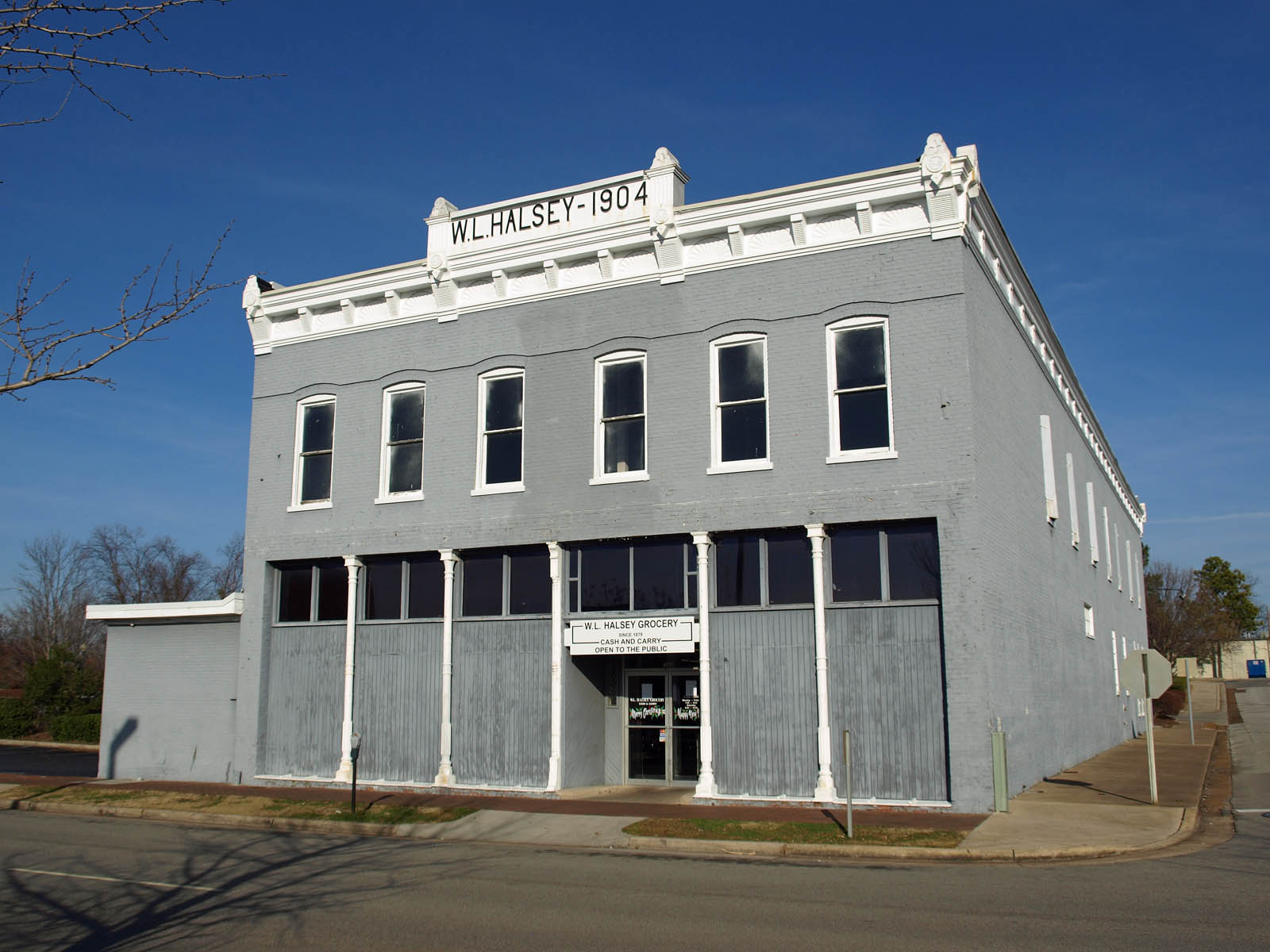
- The building in December 2009

- Location within Huntsville, Alabama Location within Alabama Location within the United States
- Location: 300 N. Jefferson St., Huntsville, Alabama
- Coordinates: 34°44′0″N 86°35′17″W
- Area: less than one acre
- Built: 1904
- MPS: Downtown Huntsville MRA
- NRHP reference No.: 80000711
- Added to NRHP: September 22, 1980

The W. L. Halsey Warehouse is a historic warehouse in Huntsville, Alabama. The two-story brick structure was built in 1904 by the W. L. Halsey grocery company. The façade is divided into six bays by locally produced cast iron columns. Originally, the street level presented a fully glass storefront, but all bays but the doorway have been covered with wood panels. Windows on the second floor are one-over-one sashes topped with decorative brick arches; ten similar windows on the side of the building facing Meridian Street have been covered. The cornice has sunburst patterns alternating with triangular brackets. A panel over the center of the cornice reads "W.L. Halsey - 1904".

The area of Jefferson Street was known as "Grocery Row", due to the number of grocery, vegetable, and fruit warehouses on the block. The W. L. Halsey Warehouse is across the street from the Halsey Grocery Warehouse, which is adjacent to 305 Jefferson Street, the Kelly Brothers and Rowe Building, and the Lombardo Building. The buildings lie one block south of the Huntsville Depot.

The building was listed on the National Register of Historic Places in 1980.
