= 305 Jefferson Street =

- Building at 305 Jefferson
- U.S. National Register of Historic Places
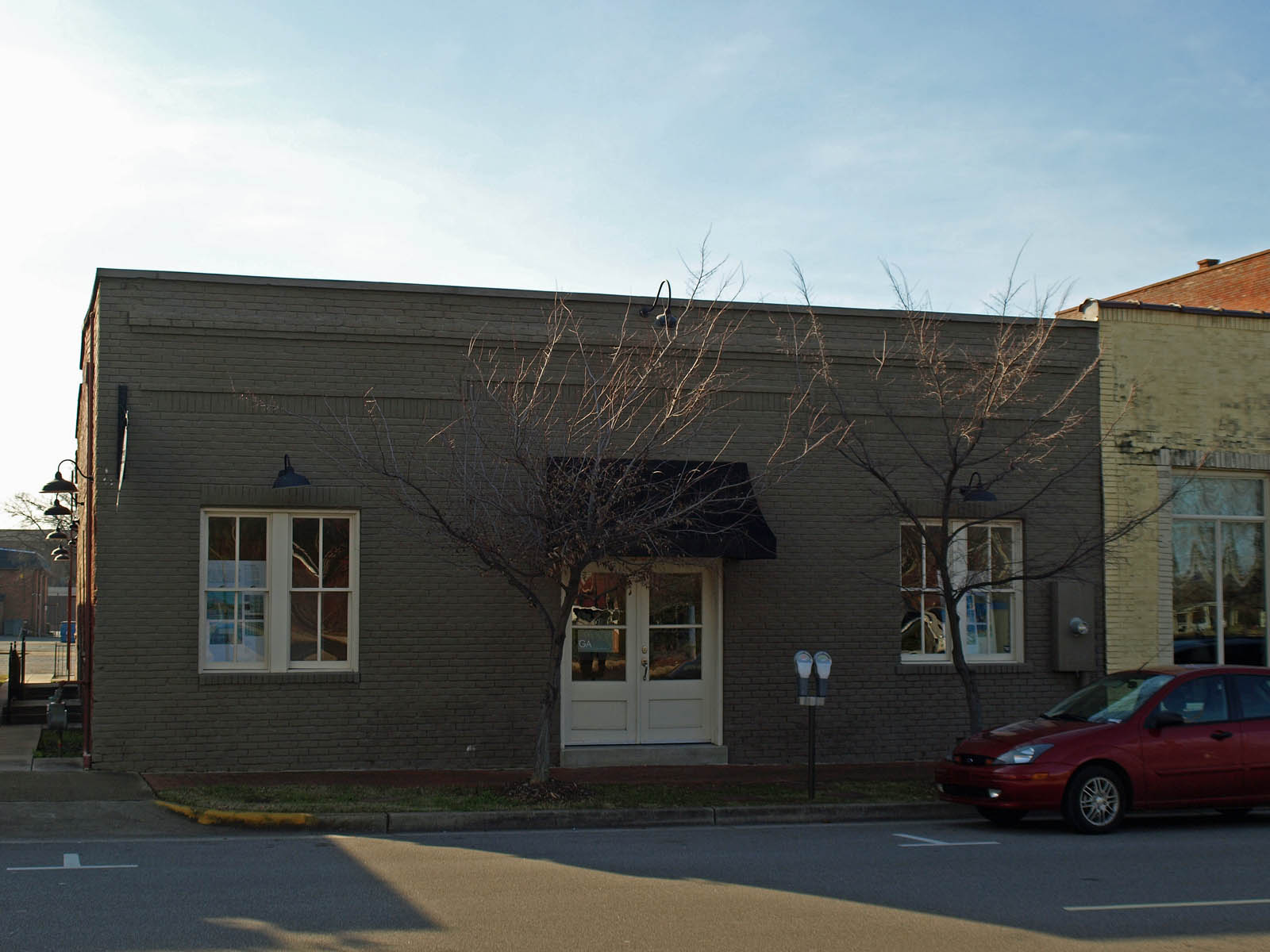
- The building in December 2009

- Location within Huntsville, Alabama Location within Alabama Location within the United States
- Location: 305 Jefferson St., Huntsville, Alabama
- Coordinates: 34°44′0″N 86°35′18″W
- Area: less than one acre
- Built: 1925
- MPS: Downtown Huntsville MRA
- NRHP reference No.: 03001134
- Added to NRHP: November 15, 2003

305 Jefferson Street is a historic warehouse in Huntsville, Alabama. It was built by grocery wholesaler W. L. Halsey circa 1925. Halsey operated the warehouse until 1957, when it was sold and rented to other tenants, at times including a beer distributor and a Salvation Army storage facility. It was subdivided into three units in the 1970s. The brick building is rectangular, with the narrow side facing the street. On the main façade, a double entry door is flanked by pairs of two-over-two sash windows. The south side of the building has two large openings for the warehouse doors; these have since been replaced with glass doors leading to the middle unit. Two of the three original sliding wood doors remain, and cover the glass entries in the middle unit. More two-over-two windows are distributed along the south wall. The rear originally had a warehouse door, now replaced by double glass doors, with a single two-over-two window on either side.

The area of Jefferson Street was known as "Grocery Row", due to the number of grocery, vegetable, and fruit warehouses on the block. 305 is adjacent to the Kelly Brothers and Rowe Building, which is next to the Lombardo Building, and is separated by a narrow alley from the Halsey Grocery Warehouse, and across the street from the W. L. Halsey Warehouse. The buildings lie one block south of the Huntsville Depot.

The building was listed on the National Register of Historic Places in 2003.
