= Kelly Brothers and Rowe Building =

- U.S. National Register of Historic Places
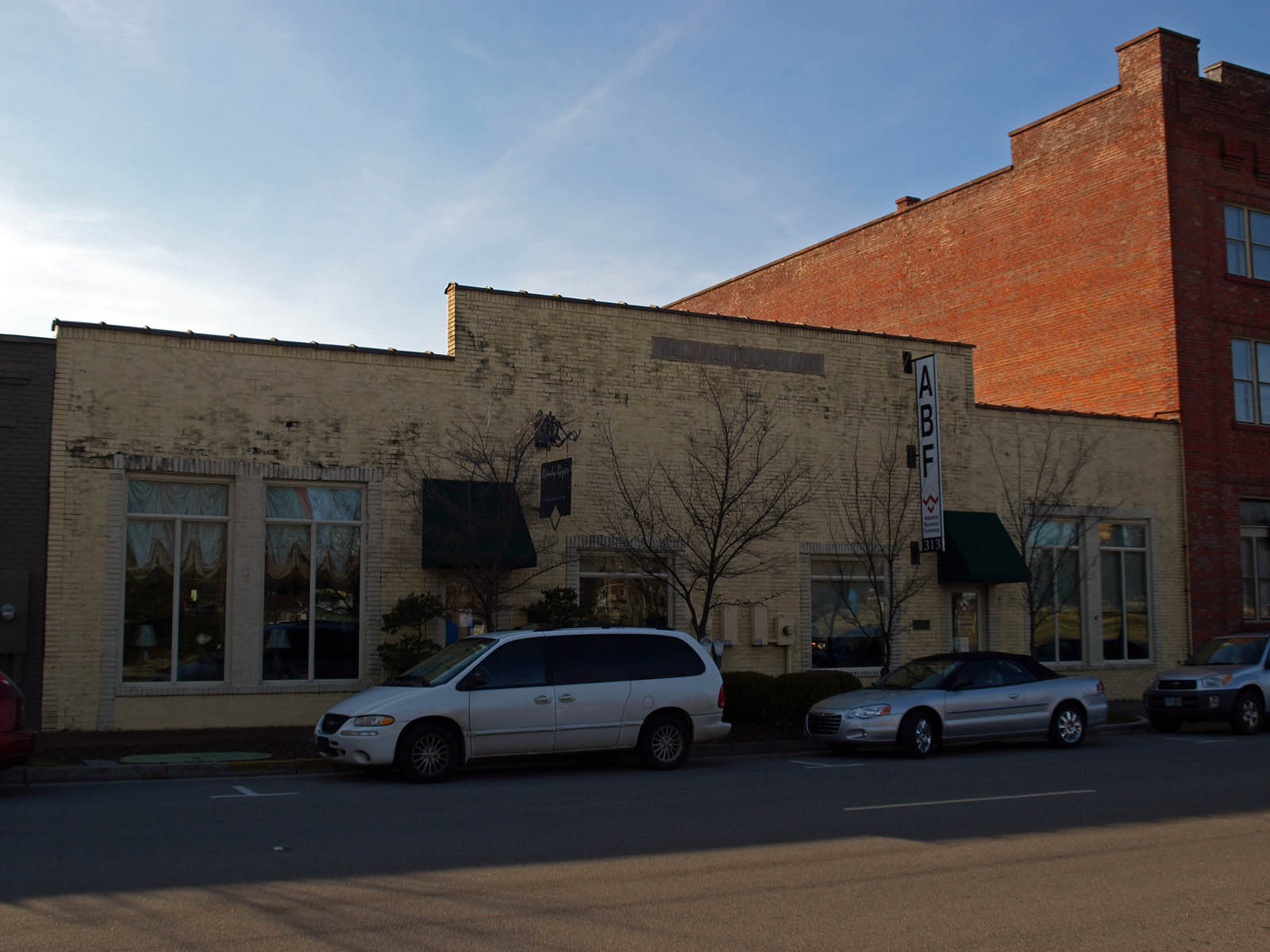
- The building in December 2009

- Location within Huntsville, Alabama Location within Alabama Location within the United States
- Location: 307 N. Jefferson St., Huntsville, Alabama
- Coordinates: 34°44′0″N 86°35′19″W
- Area: less than one acre
- Built: 1928
- Architectural style: Commercial Brick
- MPS: Downtown Huntsville MRA
- NRHP reference No.: 80000716
- Added to NRHP: September 22, 1980

The Kelly Brothers and Rowe Building is a historic warehouse in Huntsville, Alabama. Built in 1928, the façade is nearly free of ornamentation, except for a raised central parapet, with a plaque reading "Kelly Bros. & Rowe", and soldier course brick outlining the building and openings. Originally, the front featured two large warehouse doors, each with an entry door and a multi-pane window towards the center of the building. The warehouse doors have each been replaced with a twin-pane fixed window and transom, and the multi-pane windows have been replaced with a single pane and transom.

The area of Jefferson Street was known as "Grocery Row", due to the number of grocery, vegetable, and fruit warehouses on the block. The Kelly Brothers and Rowe Building is adjacent to the Lombardo Building and 305 Jefferson Street, which is next to the Halsey Grocery Warehouse and across the street from the W. L. Halsey Warehouse. The buildings lie one block south of the Huntsville Depot.

The building was listed on the National Register of Historic Places in 1980.
