= Halsey Grocery Warehouse =

- U.S. National Register of Historic Places
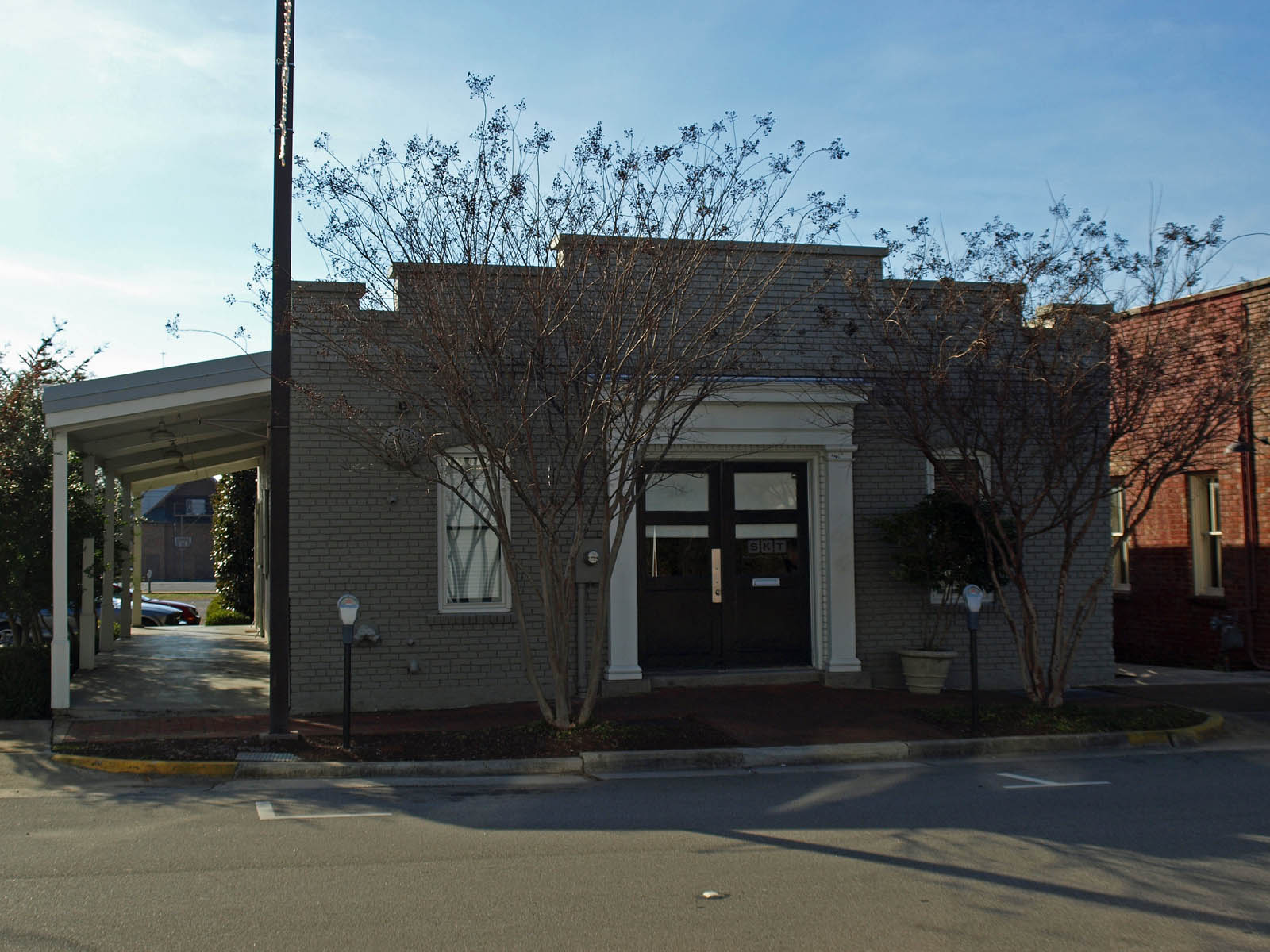
- The building in December 2009

- Location within Huntsville, Alabama Location within Alabama Location within the United States
- Location: 301 N. Jefferson St., Huntsville, Alabama
- Coordinates: 34°44′0″N 86°35′18″W
- Area: 0.1 acres (0.040 ha)
- Built: 1923
- Built by: Baxter Bros.
- Architectural style: Commercial Brick
- MPS: Downtown Huntsville MRA
- NRHP reference No.: 80000710
- Added to NRHP: September 22, 1980

The Halsey Grocery Warehouse is a historic warehouse in Huntsville, Alabama. It was built in 1923 as a second grocery warehouse for the W. L. Halsey company. The one-story building is simple in design, especially when compared with the company's earlier building across the street. The façade is of grey painted brick with a stepped parapet. The central double entrance door is flanked by single windows, each of which is topped with a brick arch. The pilasters and entablature surrounding the door are a later addition; originally, the door was topped only with a rowlock course of brick. The south side has a shed roof covering what was the loading area.

The area of Jefferson Street was known as "Grocery Row", due to the number of grocery, vegetable, and fruit warehouses on the block. The Halsey Grocery Warehouse is adjacent to 305 Jefferson Street, the Kelly Brothers and Rowe Building, and the Lombardo Building, and is across the street from the W. L. Halsey Warehouse. The buildings lie one block south of the Huntsville Depot.

The building was listed on the National Register of Historic Places in 1980.
