= Old City Hall (Mobile, Alabama) =

- U.S. National Register of Historic Places
- U.S. National Historic Landmark
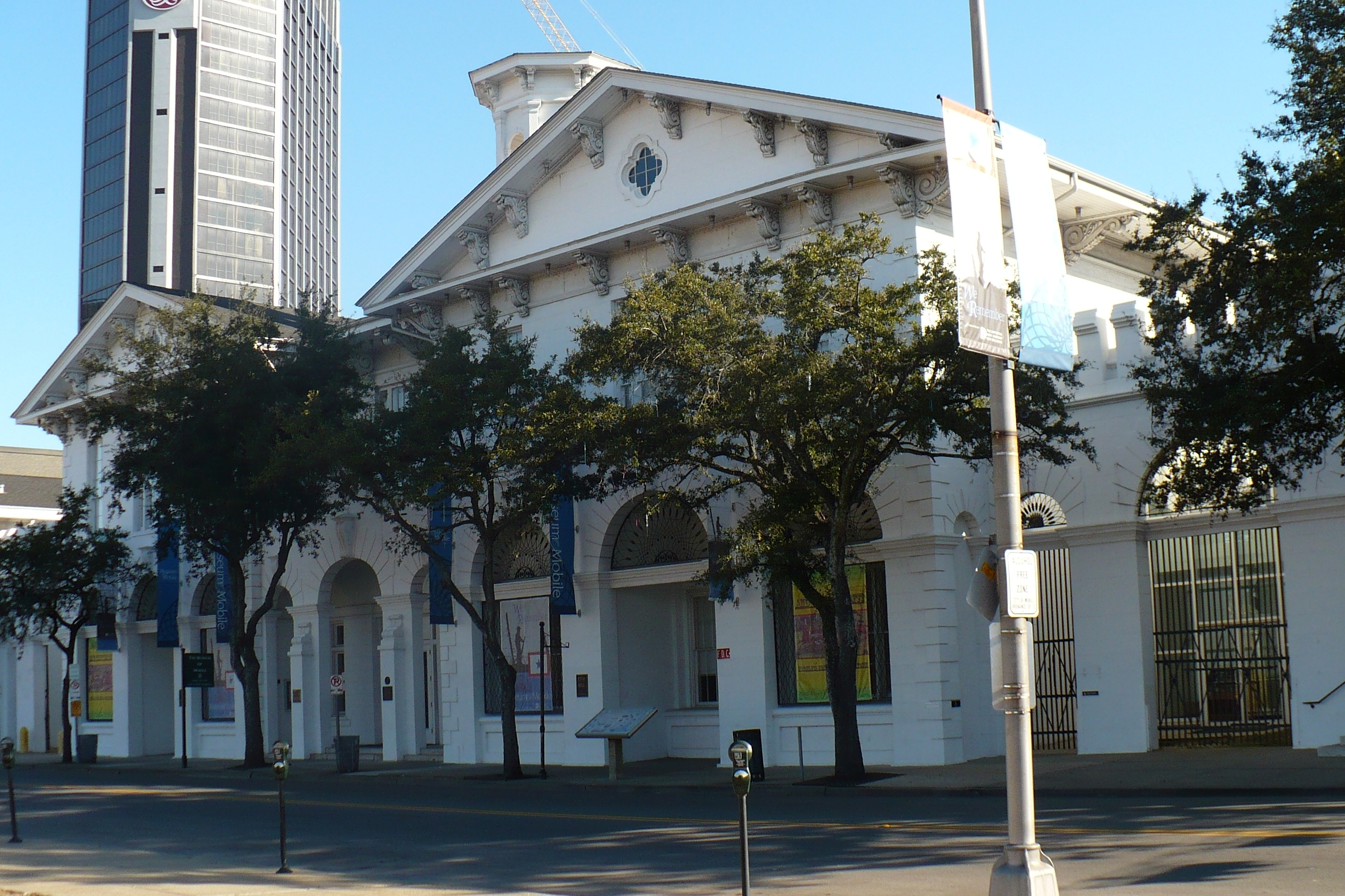
- The building in 2008.

- Location within Mobile, Alabama Location within Alabama Location within the United States
- Location: 111 South Royal Street, Mobile, Alabama, United States
- Coordinates: 30°41′23″N 88°2′23″W
- Built: 1855-57
- Architect: Thomas S. James; William L. Denham; Frederick W. Clarke
- Architectural style: Italianate
- NRHP reference No.: 69000034

Significant dates
- Added to NRHP: December 3, 1969
- Designated NHL: November 7, 1973

Old City Hall, also known as the Southern Market, is a historic complex of adjoining buildings in Mobile, Alabama, that currently houses the History Museum of Mobile. The complex was built from 1855 to 1857 to serve as a city hall and as a marketplace. It was declared a National Historic Landmark in 1973, as a rare well-preserved example of a 19th-century multifunction civic and commercial building.

== History ==
The building was originally planned by the city in 1854 as the principal city marketplace for selling vegetables, meat, and fish. In February 1855 it was decided that the building would also house some of the municipal offices with approval on 1 June 1855 of $44,000 in municipal bonds to pay for construction. The architect for this initial building phase was Thomas Simmons James, a Mobile architect originally from Virginia. On 27 December 1855, while the new building was under construction, the existing city hall on Conti and Jackson Street burned. As a consequence, in May 1856, the city passed a resolution approving $40,000 to complete and expand the building with accommodation for the mayor, city clerk, city treasurer, and two city boards. Payment receipts indicate that the building was completed by 20 April 1857.

In 1910 the building was altered by architect William L. Denham. A new council chamber was added above a new second floor bridge connecting the front and back of the central sections. The original open passageway between the two central sections was enclosed to create an entrance lobby and the stairway was reoriented to the east wall of the lobby. The complex was altered again in the mid-1930s by architect Frederick W. Clarke. Most of the work involved infilling some of the formerly open spaces with interior spaces. Also, murals by John Walker depicting scenes from local Mobile history were painted at this time. The complex was damaged by Hurricane Frederic on 12 September 1979, causing the tenants at that time to vacate the building. It was later restored.

== Description ==
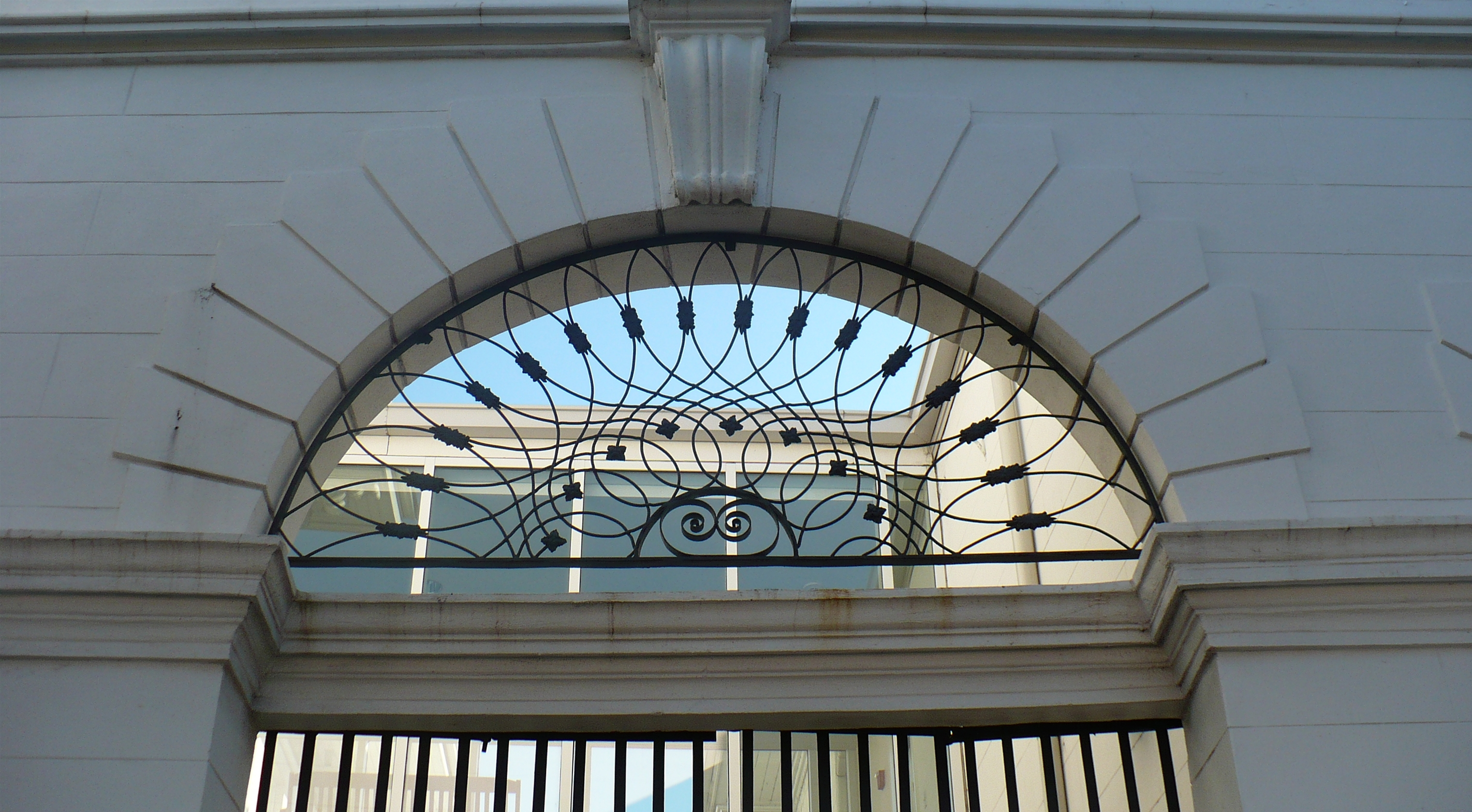
Detail of the arcade ironwork.

The complex is Italianate style in design and comprises four rectangular sections connected by three arcaded passageways. The grouping is 244 feet (74 m) wide on Royal Street, 275 feet (84 m) long on Church Street, and the back is 213 feet (65 m) wide on Water Street. The building is stucco over brick construction with wood trim and brackets.

The two central sections form a U-shaped mass, fronted on Royal Street and extend to Water Street. They are two floors in elevation on Royal Street and one floor in elevation on Water Street. This central section is crowned with a central octagonal cupola. The two annex wings are also two floors in elevation, although of lesser height than the central sections. The south wing annex is 30 feet (9 m) wide by 275 feet (84 m) long and faces Church Street. The ground floor of the south wing once housed stalls and shops for the market, but has since been altered to enclose the space. The north wing annex is 30 feet (9 m) wide and is much shorter in length than the south wing. The north wall is attached to the neighboring Gulf Coast Exploreum.

== Museum ==
Beginning in 1997 the building was renovated to house the History Museum of Mobile. An addition was added to the back of the building in 2000 to house the museum's permanent exhibits and staff offices. The museum was closed for repairs for approximately six months following flood damage from Hurricane Katrina in 2005.

The exhibits cover two large floors of the complex and chronicle 300 years of Mobile history. The museum normally has a six-month-long featured exhibit, special collections exhibits that are rotated periodically, and several permanent exhibits. The permanent exhibits include: the Old Ways New Days exhibit that explores Mobile's history from colonization to the present, and the Walls and Halls exhibit featuring furniture, antique silver, artwork, and other artifacts.

== Images ==
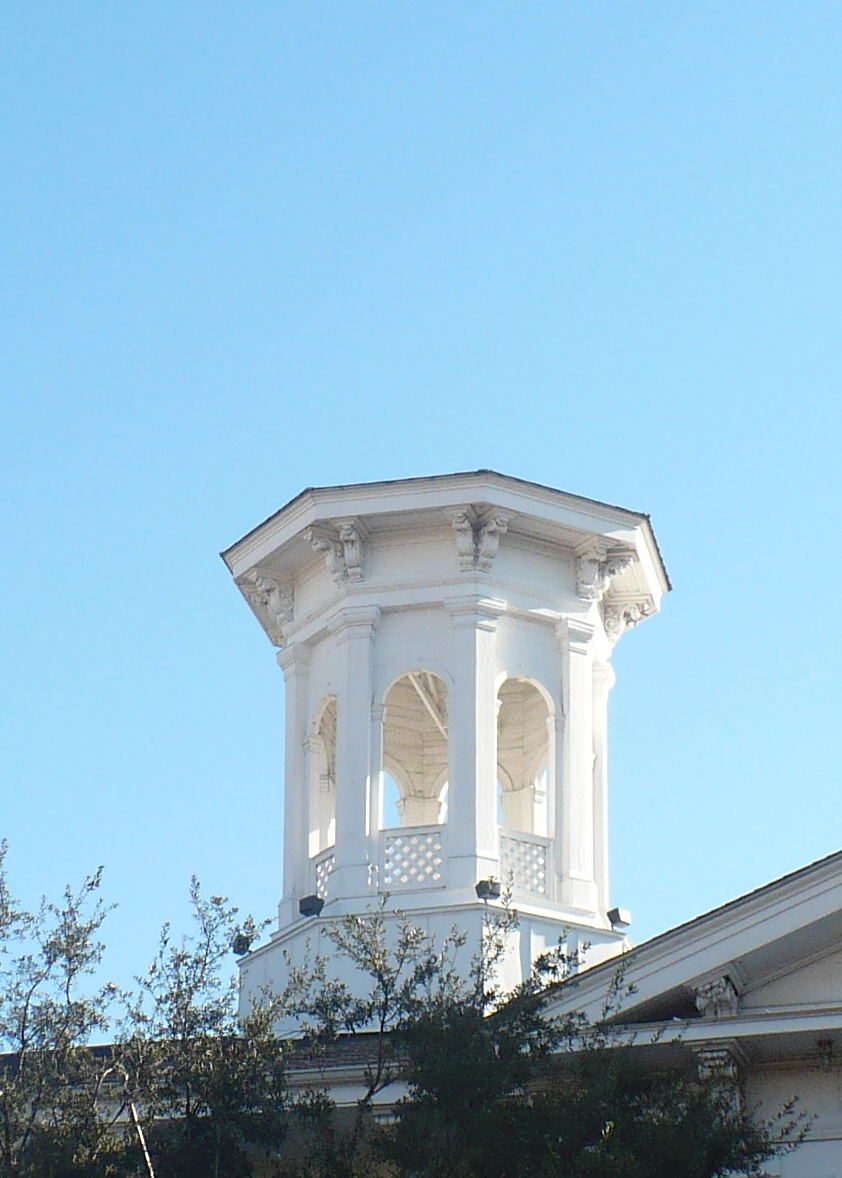
Detail of the cupola.

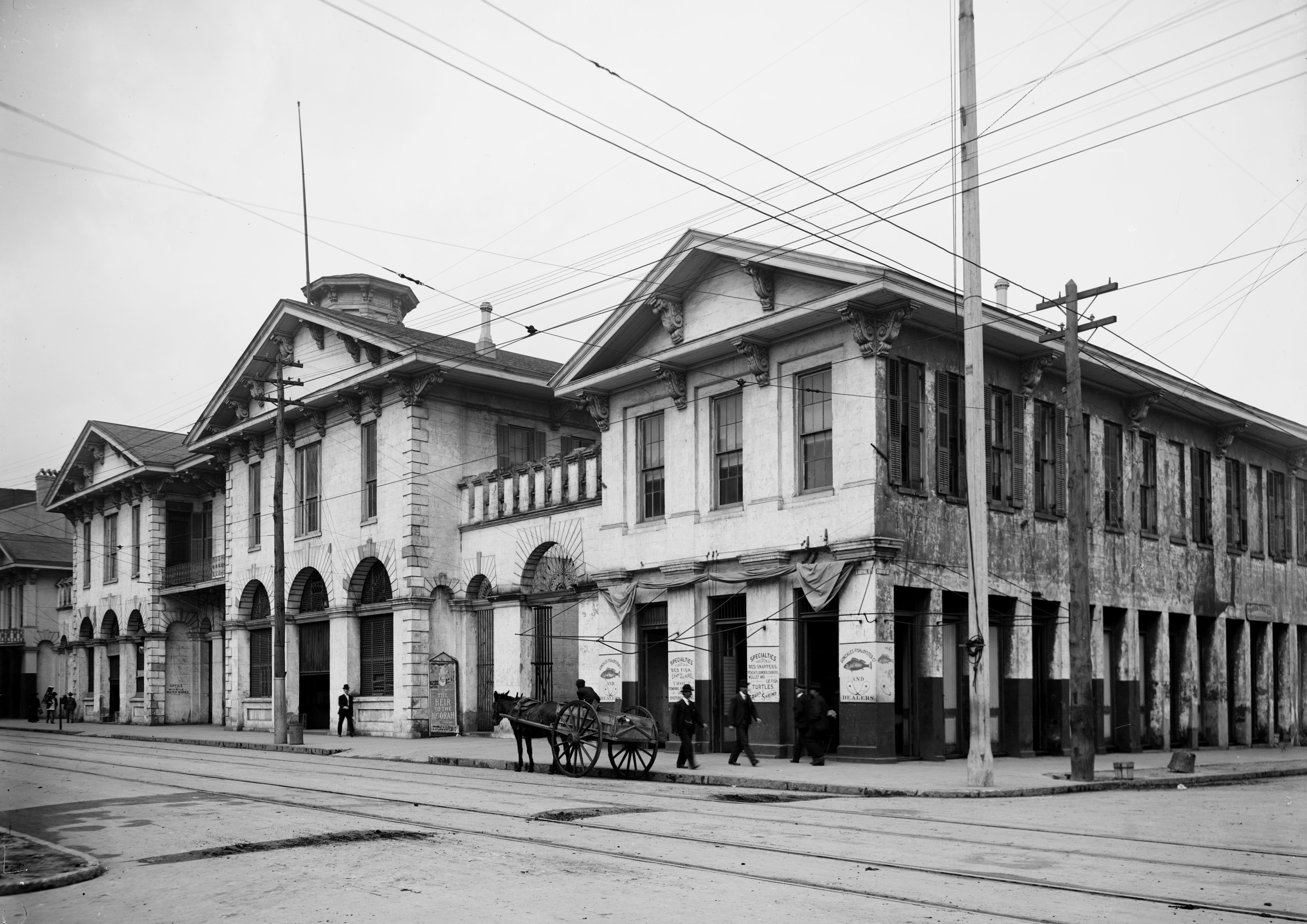
Photo taken in 1906.

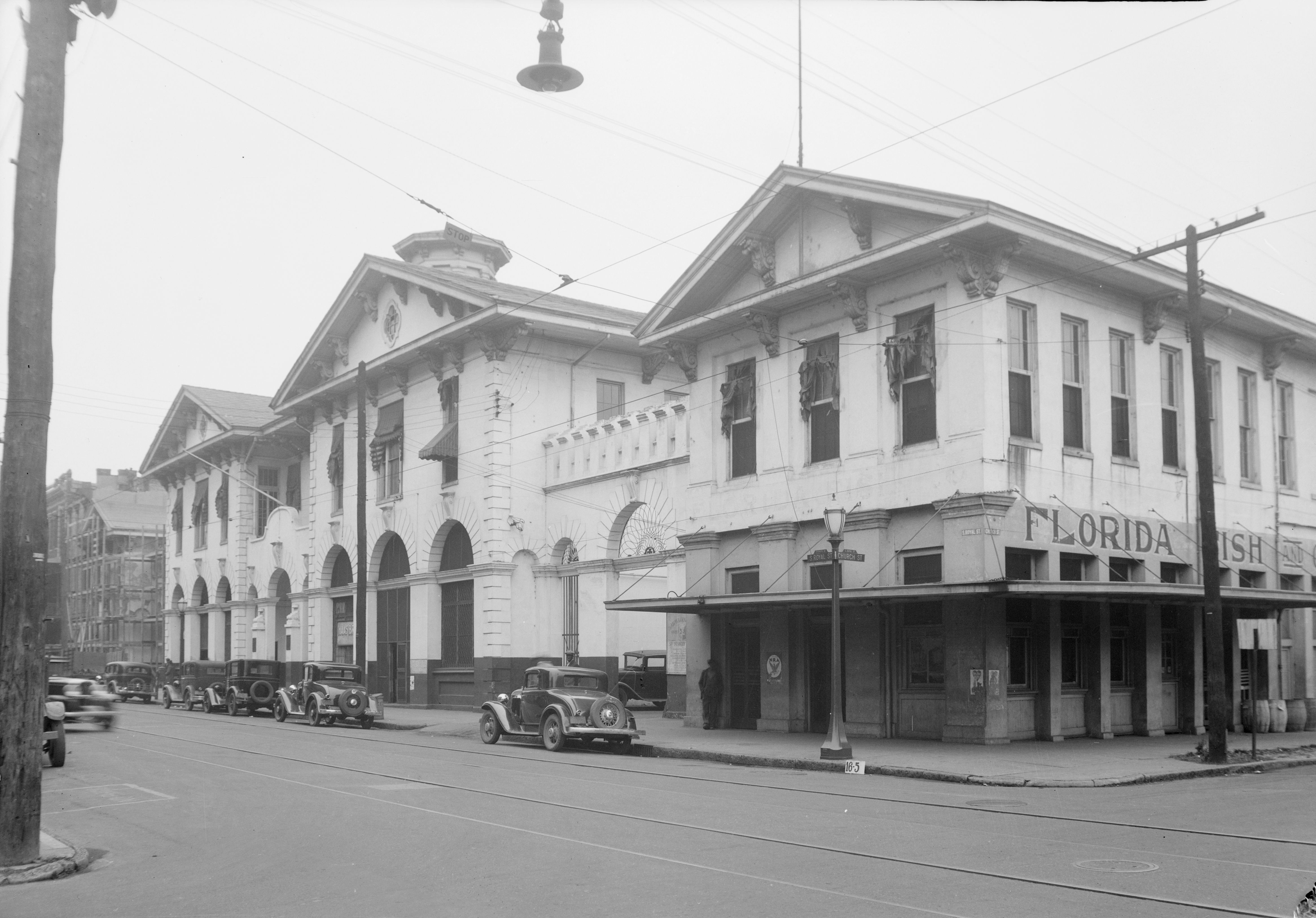
HABS photo taken in 1934.

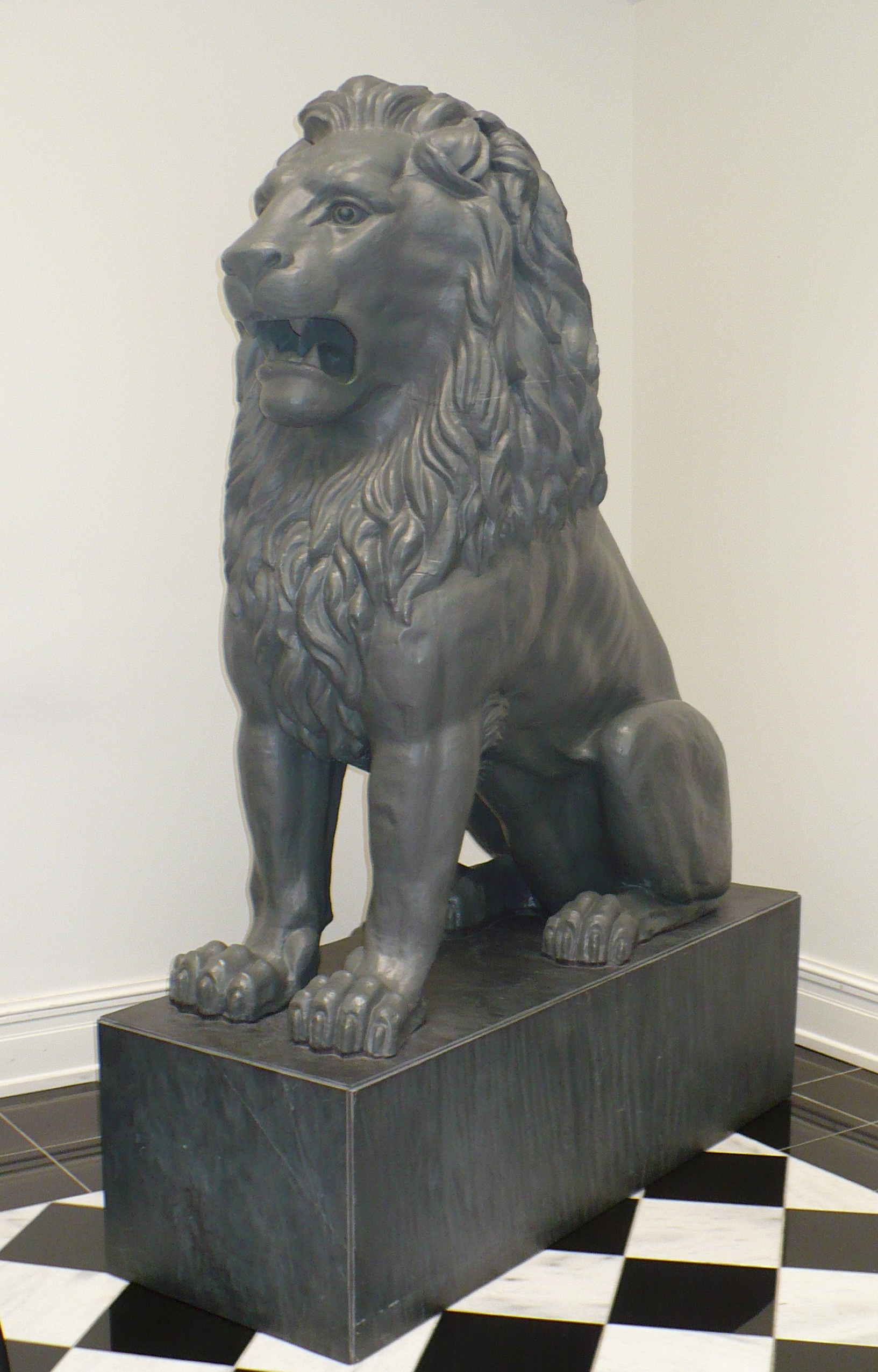
One of a pair of antique statuary lions at the entrance to the exhibits.

== See also ==
- List of National Historic Landmarks in Alabama
- National Register of Historic Places listings in Mobile, Alabama
