= Lockheed XH-51 =

1962 experimental helicopter series by Lockheed

XH-51
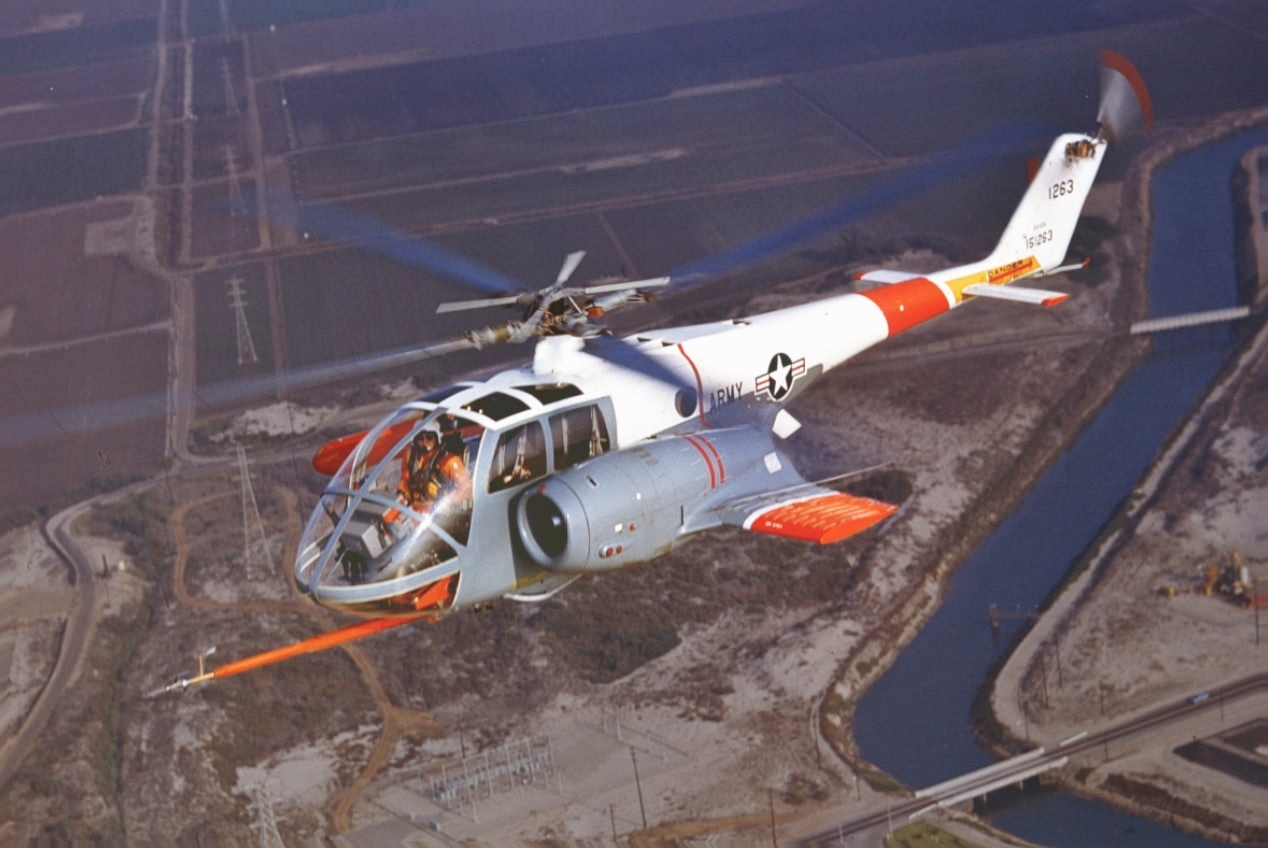
- XH-51A following its conversion into a compound rotorcraft testbed

General information
- Type: Experimental helicopter
- Manufacturer: Lockheed Corporation
- Status: Retired
- Primary users: United States Army NASA
- Number built: 3

History
- Manufactured: 1962–1964
- First flight: 2 November 1962

The Lockheed XH-51 (Model 186) is an American single-engine experimental helicopter designed by Lockheed Aircraft, utilizing a rigid rotor and retractable skid landing gear. The XH-51 was selected as the test vehicle for a joint research program conducted by the United States Army and United States Navy to explore rigid rotor technology.

== Design and development ==
Lockheed began developing its rigid rotor concept with the CL-475 helicopter design in 1959. The choice of a rigid rotor meant that the helicopter was more agile than it would have been with a flapping rotor. The performance of the CL-475 encouraged Lockheed to seek further development. Lockheed submitted the CL-475 to the Army as a candidate to replace the Bell OH-13 Sioux and Hiller OH-23 Raven observation helicopters. Lockheed also tested the commercial market waters without success. However, in February 1962, Lockheed's Model 186, a new design based on the CL-475 rigid rotor, was selected as the winner for a joint Army-Navy program to evaluate the rigid rotor for high-speed flight capability.

== Operational history ==
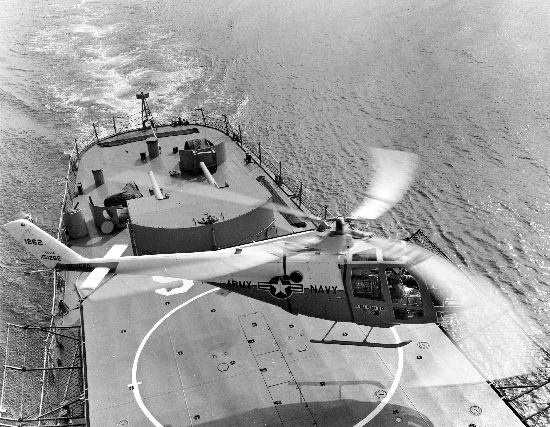
The first XH-51A landing on USS Ozbourn

Two four-seat, three-bladed XH-51As were ordered and built for the program. Powered by the 550 shp (410 kW) Pratt & Whitney Canada PT6B-9 turboshaft engine, XH-51A (serial number 61-51262) first flew on 2 November 1962. As flight testing progressed, the original three-bladed, rigid rotor system demonstrated instability at higher speed ranges. Lockheed engineers solved the problem by modifying the aircraft with a four-bladed rotor system. In 1963, the Army's Technology Research and Evaluation Command (TRECOM) contracted with Lockheed to modify one of the XH-51 aircraft into a compound helicopter.

The second XH-51A (serial number 61-51263) was subsequently converted by adding wings with a span of 16.1 ft (4.9 m), and a 2,900 lbf (12.9 kN) Pratt & Whitney J60-2 turbojet engine mounted on the left wing to increase performance. The XH-51A Compound first flew without powering up the turbojet on 21 September 1964, while tests were conducted for balance and handling. The aircraft's first flight as a true compound helicopter took place on 10 April 1965. and on 29 November 1967 achieved a speed of 263 knots (303 mph; 487 km/h) in a shallow descent. The highest level flight speed was 223 kn (413 km/h; 257 mph).

In June 1964, NASA ordered a five-seat, three-bladed variant, the XH-51N (NASA 531) as a helicopter test vehicle.

Lockheed built two demonstrator aircraft, designated the Lockheed Model 286, to market to the public (registration numbers N286L and N265LC). These aircraft had the five-seat configuration of the XH-51N with the four-bladed rotor system of the XH-51A. The Model 286 was certificated for civil operation by the FAA on 30 June 1966, but Lockheed never sold any aircraft. Lockheed used the aircraft for several years as executive transports. The aircraft were eventually sold to a collector and later destroyed by fire in 1988.

To meet the US Army's "Advanced Aerial Fire Support System" program for an attack helicopter, Lockheed designed a rigid rotor compound helicopter with a pusher tail-mounted propeller which was ordered into production as the Lockheed AH-56 Cheyenne attack helicopter. However, technical problems led first to delays then to a suspension of production. Compounded by inter-service rivalry and political issues the Cheyenne was cancelled completely in 1972 and it was Lockheed's last helicopter.

== Variants ==
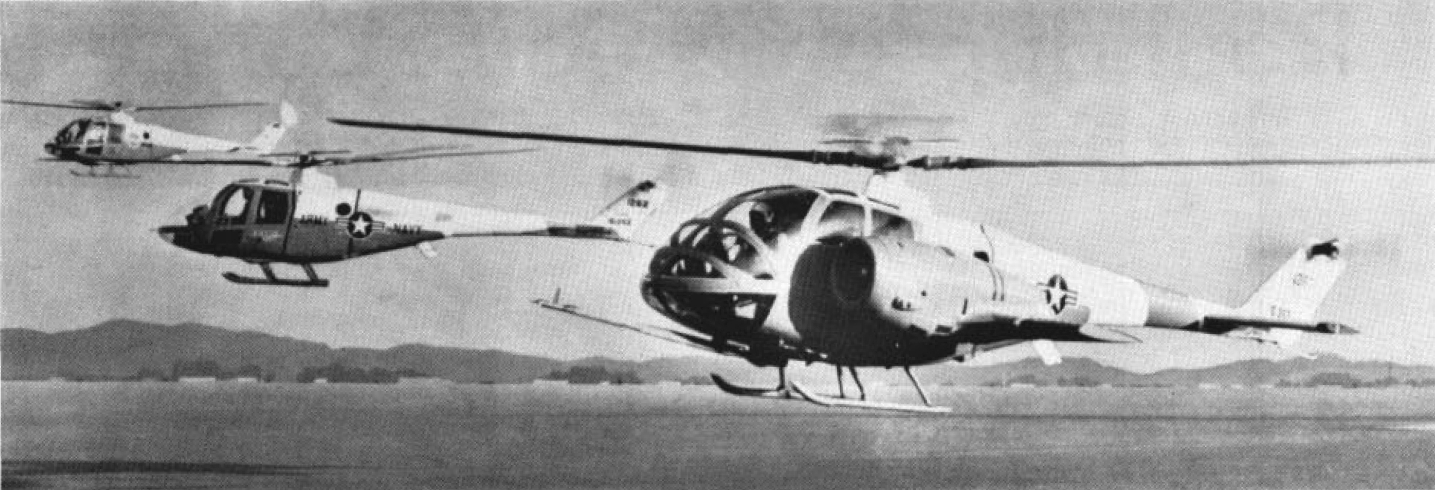
The three XH-51s in flight.

XH-51A
four place, three-bladed rotor
XH-51A Compound
modified with a four-bladed rotor and stub wings and an auxiliary 2,900 lbf (13 kN) Pratt & Whitney J60-2 engine.
XH-51N
five place, three-bladed rotor for NASA test purposes.
Model 286
five place civilian or military light helicopter offered for sale, none were sold.

== Surviving aircraft ==
The two XH-51A examples (Serial Numbers 61-51262 and 61-51263) are stored at the United States Army Aviation Museum at Fort Rucker.

== Specifications (XH-51A) ==
Data from Janes's All The World's Aircraft 1969-70

General characteristics

- Crew: 2
- Length: 40 ft 9 in (12.42 m)
- Height: 8 ft 2.5 in (2.50 m)
- Empty weight: 2,790 lb (1,266 kg)
- Max takeoff weight: 4,100 lb (1,860 kg)
- Fuel capacity: 80 US gal (67 imp gal; 300 L)
- Powerplant: 1 × Pratt & Whitney Canada PT6B-9 turboshaft, 500 shp (370 kW)
- Main rotor diameter: 35 ft 0 in (10.67 m)
- Main rotor area: 962 sq ft (89.4 m^{2})

Performance

- Maximum speed: 151 kn (174 mph, 280 km/h)
- Cruise speed: 140 kn (160 mph, 260 km/h)
- Range: 230 nmi (260 mi, 420 km)
- Service ceiling: 16,000 ft (4,900 m) (hover ceiling), in ground effect
- Rate of climb: 2,000 ft/min (10 m/s)

== See also ==
Related development

- Lockheed CL-475
- AH-56 Cheyenne

Related lists

- List of United States military helicopters
- List of helicopters
