= Cullman County Museum =

History museum in Alabama, US

Coordinates: 34.1796°N 86.8433°W

- Established: 1973
- Location: 211 2nd Avenue N.E., Cullman, Alabama 35055
- Type: Local History Museum
- Website: http://www.cullmancountymuseum.com/

The Cullman County Museum is a local history museum located in downtown Cullman, Alabama, on the corner of Arnold St. and 2nd Ave. N.E. It is housed in a replica of the home of Col. John G. Cullmann, the founder of Cullman. The museum, which opened in 1973 during the town's centennial, collects and preserves items that illustrate life in Cullman's past, including the area's natural history and its Native American and German settlers.

== Permanent galleries ==
The museum features the following galleries:

- Archaeological Room
- Primitive Room
- Clothing Store
- Main Street
- Nursery
- Music & Photo Gallery
- Col. Cullmann's Room
- Natural History Room
