= EarlyWorks Children's Museum =

Children's museum in Huntsville, Alabama

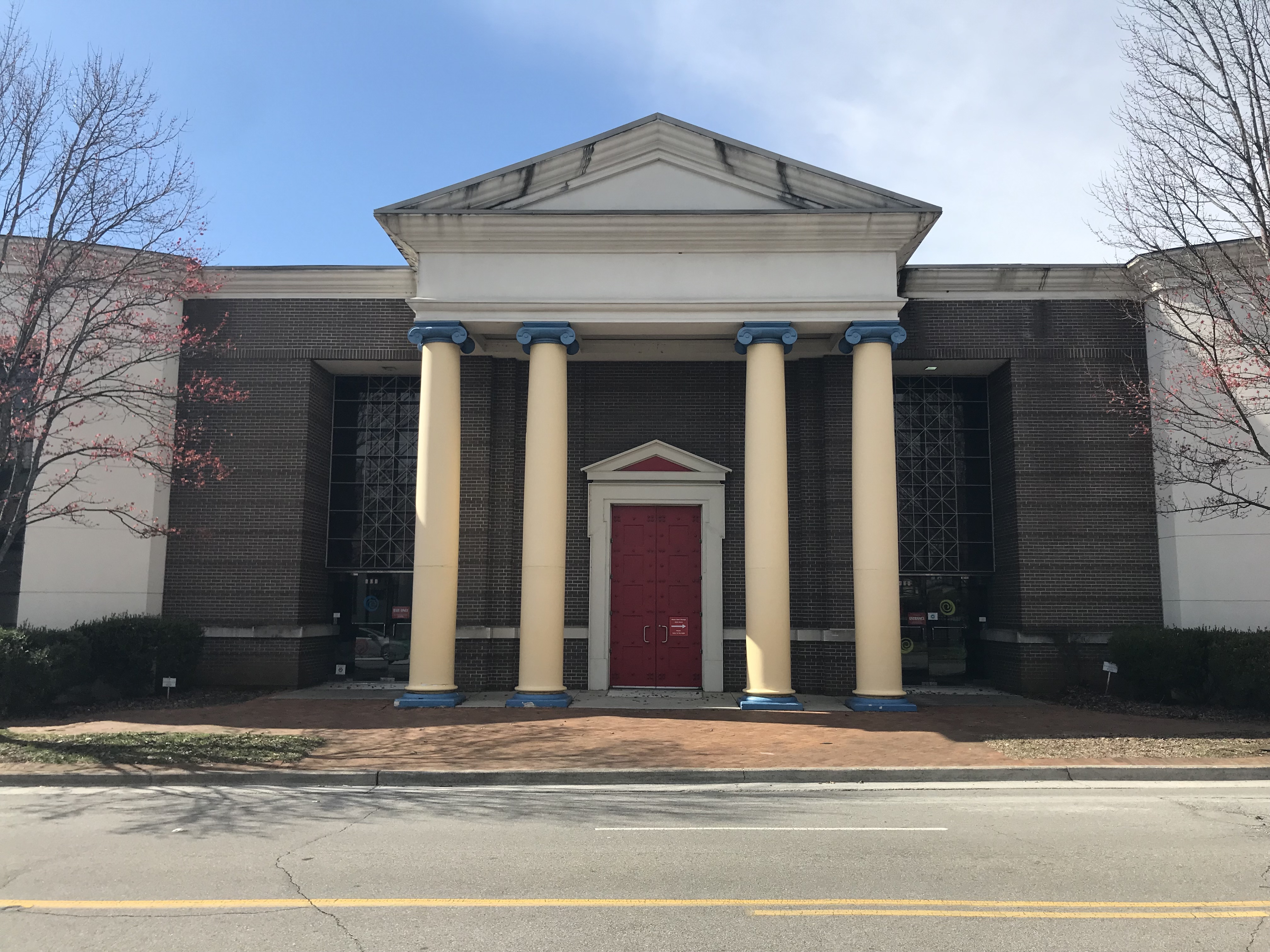
- The EarlyWorks Children's Museum in 2023
- Established: December 1998
- Location: Huntsville, Alabama
- Coordinates: 34.728267981385°N 86.58448833843345°W
- Type: Children's Museum
- Executive director: Beth Goodwin
- Chairperson: Charles "Chase" Allen
- Website: earlyworks.com

The EarlyWorks Children's Museum is a hands-on children's museum in downtown Huntsville, Alabama. The museum is a part of the EarlyWorks Family of Museums, which includes the Alabama Constitution Village and formerly included the Huntsville Depot. (Note: In October 2024, the City of Huntsville took over operation of the Huntsville Depot after the museum had been closed since the COVID-19 pandemic.)

The EarlyWorks Children's Museum is one of the largest hands-on history museums in the Southern United States. It was included in the Alabama Department of Tourism's list of top attractions for spring break family trips in 2017.

== Activities and exhibits ==
The self-guided tour of the museum includes a short film narrated by former professional football player Bo Jackson. The museum also features a mural painted by Alabama artist John "Jahni" Moore.

In 2016, 2017, and 2018, the museum held a special exhibition called "Dog Days of Summer" which highlighted the history of famous dogs.

== Gallery ==
Talking tree

Keelboat exhibit

General Store exhibit
