= United States Army Aviation Museum =

Military and aviation museum at Fort Rucker, AL, USA

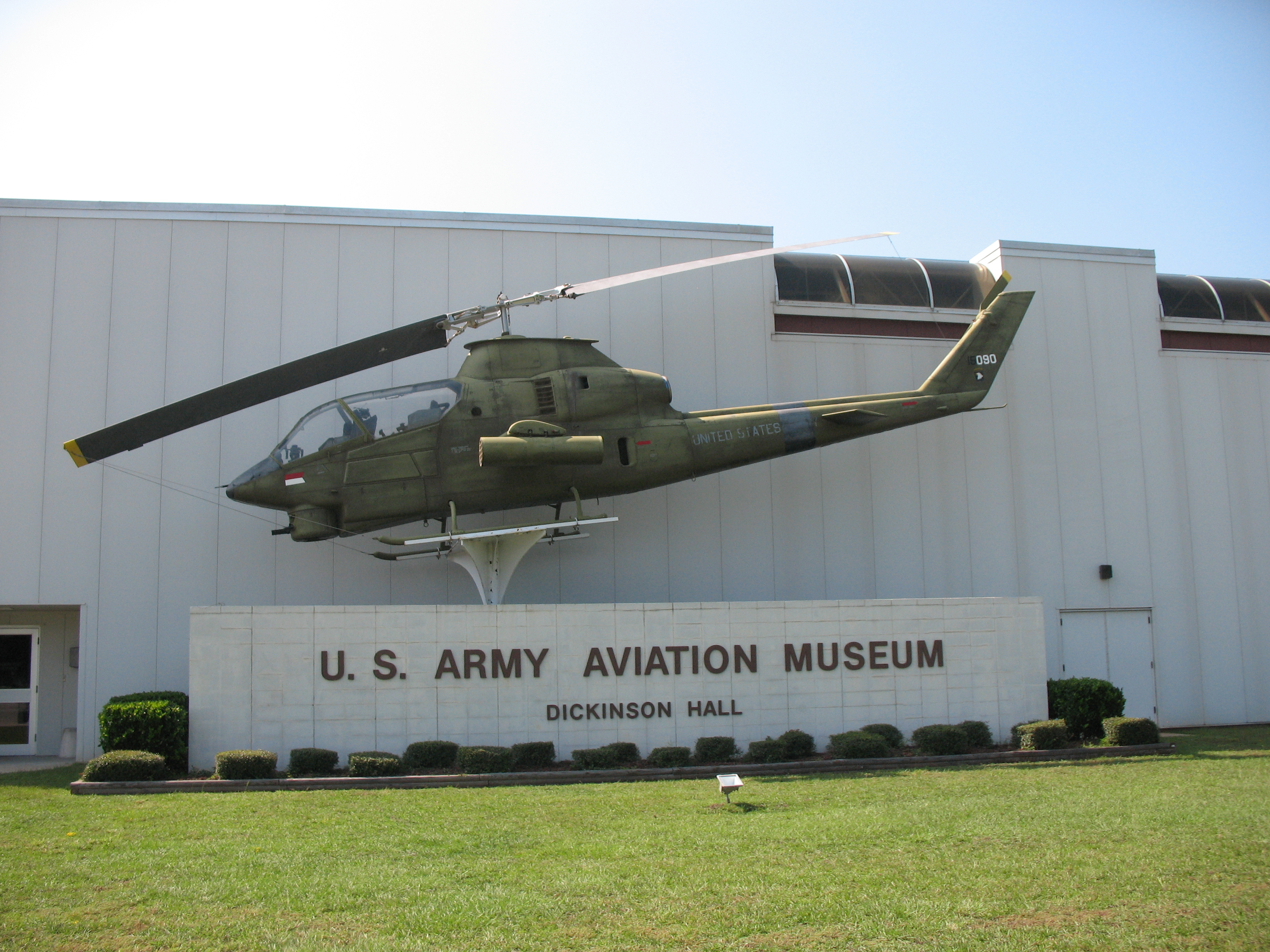
- An AH-1S Cobra helicopter in front of the museum
- Established: 1956; Open to public: 1968
- Location: Fort Rucker, Alabama 36362
- Coordinates: 31°19′27″N 085°42′47″W
- Director: Army Aviation Museum Foundation
- Website: ArmyAviationMuseum.org

The United States Army Aviation Museum is an aviation museum located on Fort Rucker near Daleville, Alabama. It has the largest collection of helicopters held by a museum in the world. The museum features some 50 aircraft on public display with aviation artifacts ranging from a replica of the Wright brothers' Model B military biplane to an RAH-66 Comanche. The museum has over 160 aircraft in its collection and holds 3,000 historical items.

== History ==
The museum announced plans to raise money to build a new structure to replace the wooden buildings in which it was housed in 1977.

The museum broke ground on a new building called the William A. Howell Training Support Facility in November 2019, which will not be open to the public. The new building opened on 12 April 2024.

== Collection ==
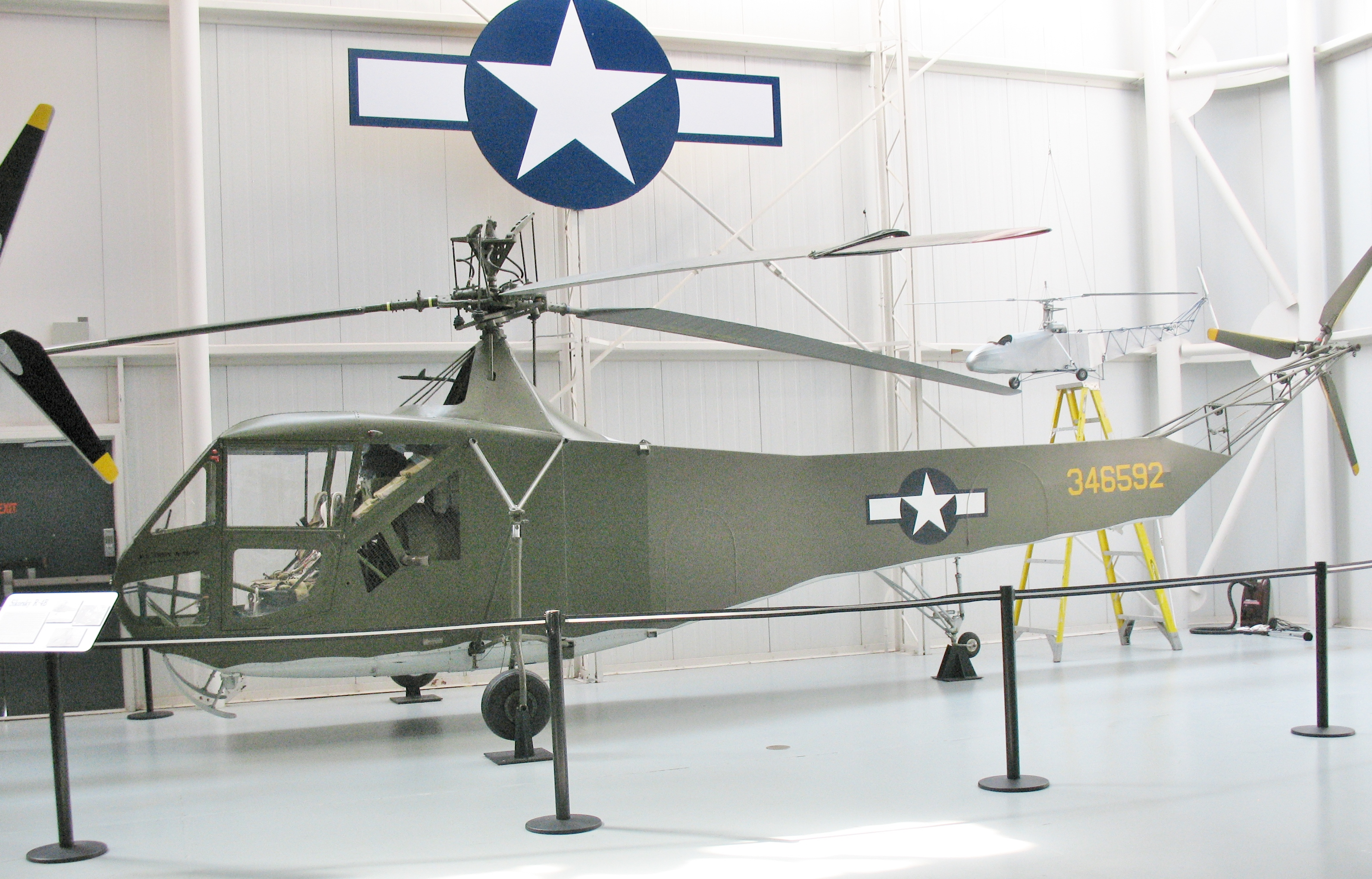
Sikorsky R-4B

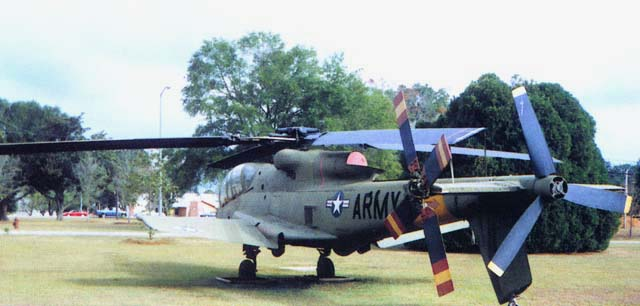
AH-56A Cheyenne

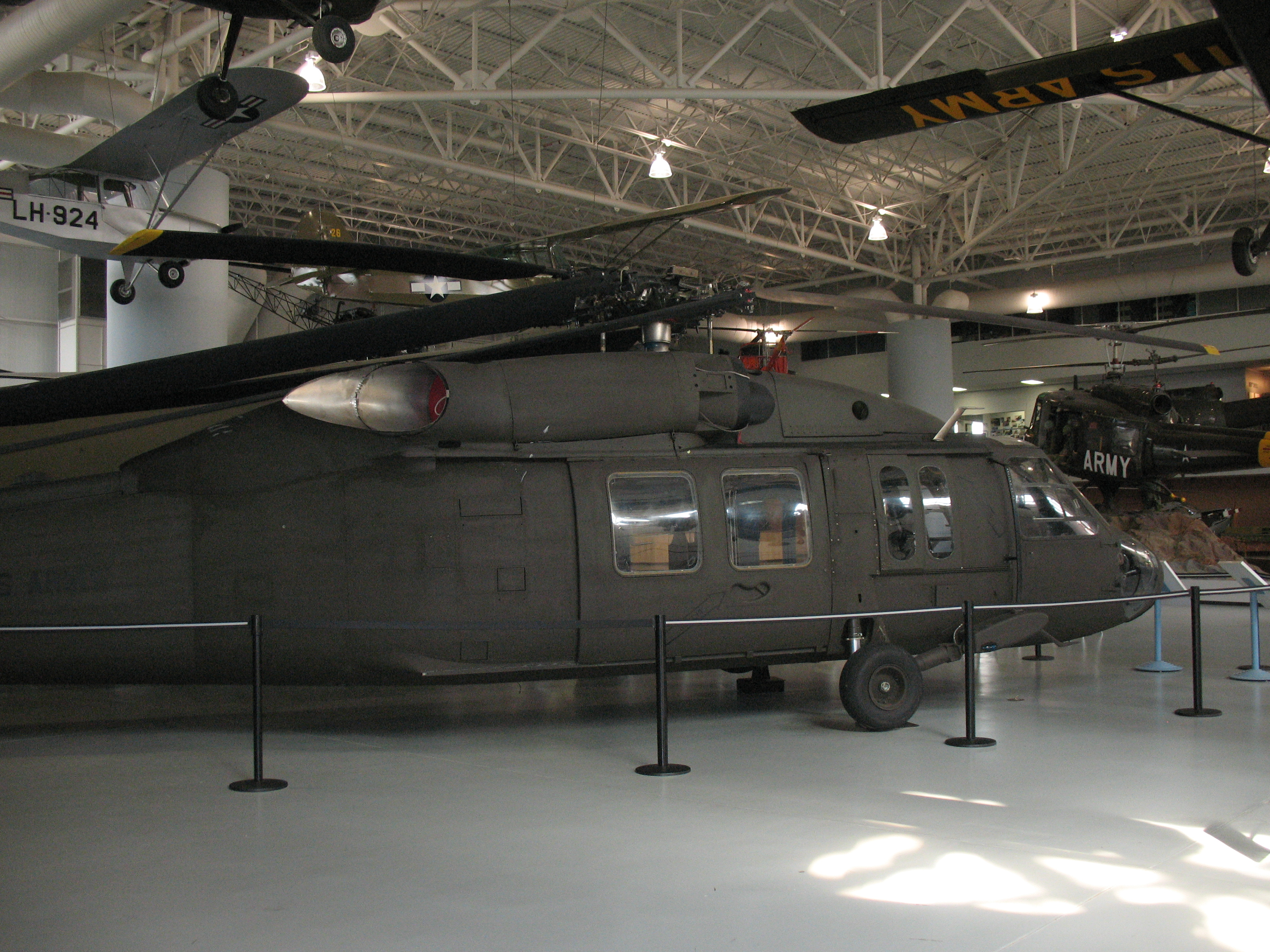
UH-60 Blackhawk

World War I aircraft

- Wright Model B
  replica
- Curtiss JN-4D Jenny
- Nieuport 28C-1
- Royal Aircraft Factory B.E.2C
- Curtiss SE-5A
- Sopwith F.1 Camel - replica

Fixed-wing aircraft

- Taylorcraft L-2 Grasshopper
- Piper L-4B Cub
- Aeronca L-16A Champ
- Cessna L-19A Bird Dog
- de Havilland Canada L-20 / YU-6A Beaver
- de Havilland Canada U-1A Otter
- de Havilland Canada YC-7A Caribou
- Grumman OV-1B Mohawk

Helicopters

- Sikorsky R-4 Hoverfly I
- Sikorsky R-5 x 2
- Sikorsky R-6 Hoverfly II
- Bell OH-13C Sioux
- Bell OH-13E Sioux
- Bell TH-13T Sioux
- Sikorsky H-19D Chickasaw
- Piasecki CH-21C Shawnee
- Hiller H-23A Raven
- Hiller OH-23B Raven
- Piasecki H-25A Army Mule
- McCulloch YH-30
- Hiller YH-32 Hornet
- Sikorsky VH-34A Army One
- Sikorsky CH-37B Mojave
- Sikorsky XH-39
- Bell XH-40
  - Bell UH-1B Iroquois (Huey) x 2
  - Bell UH-1H Iroquois
  - Bell YUH-1D/H Iroquois
  - Bell AH-1G Cobra
  - Bell AH-1S Cobra
- Hughes OH-6A Cayuse x 2
- Cessna YH-41A Seneca
- Boeing-Vertol CH-47A Chinook
- Lockheed XH-51
- Sikorsky CH-54A Tarhe
- Hughes TH-55A Osage
- Bell OH-58D Kiowa
- Lockheed AH-56A Cheyenne
- Sikorsky YUH-60 Black Hawk
- Hughes YAH-64A Apache
- McDonnell Douglas AH-64 Apache
- Boeing–Sikorsky RAH-66 Comanche

Other notable aircraft

- McDonnell XV-1 Convertiplane
- Ryan XV-5B Vertifan
- General Atomics MQ-1C
- Ryan VZ-3RY Vertiplane
- Curtiss-Wright VZ-7
- Lockheed CL-475
- Sikorsky S-72 - Rotor Systems Research Aircraft (RSRA)

Sources: US Army Aviation Museum collection pages

== See also ==
- List of aerospace museums
- List of museums in Alabama
- Southern Museum of Flight
- National Museum of the United States Air Force
- National Naval Aviation Museum
