= Lockheed CL-475 =

American experimental helicopter

CL-475
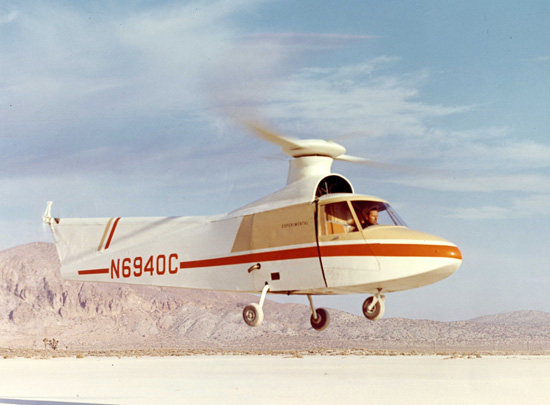
- CL-475 flight testing at Edwards Air Force Base

General information
- Type: Experimental helicopter
- National origin: United States
- Manufacturer: Lockheed Corporation
- Designer: Irv Culver
- Status: Retired
- Number built: 1
- Registration: N6940C

History
- First flight: 2 November 1959
- Fate: In storage at United States Army Aviation Museum

The Lockheed CL-475 is a two-seat, single-engine light helicopter developed by Lockheed to explore rigid rotor technology. The CL-475 has a three-bladed main rotor and a two-bladed tail rotor. Only one was built.

== Design and development ==
In 1958, Irv Culver presented an idea for how to rigidly attach the rotor blades of a helicopter to the hub, to the Lockheed management. In 1920, Juan de la Cierva had tried the same concept, but had trouble controlling the rotor, because of excessive gyroscopic moments. Culver's research led him to believe that there was a way to control the excessive pitch and roll moments by incorporating a feedback system into the rotor. Culver's solution to high control moments was a device known as the "compliance factor". It kept the blades forward less than a degree, which would apply a corrective feathering input to the opposite blade. This essentially was the moment feedback system. Before presenting his ideas, he had built a radio-controlled model that demonstrated the feasibility of the concept. Lockheed gave him use of part of a flight test hangar, a flight test engineer and two mechanics.

The CL-475 is a two-seat helicopter with a fabric-covered steel and aluminum structure. The glazed cockpit provides side-by-side seating for two occupants. The landing gear is designed in a tricycle configuration, with two large wheels mounted alongside the bottom of the fuselage, and a nosewheel mounted underneath the cockpit. The helicopter is powered by a 140 hp (104 kW), four-cylinder, air-cooled Lycoming O-360-A1A piston engine. Designed to test a rigid-rotor concept, it originally utilized a two-bladed wooden rotor.

After completion at Burbank, the CL-475 was taken to Rosamond Lake on Edwards Air Force Base in the Mojave Desert for testing. It was first flown on 2 November 1959, but the pilot reported severe vibrations. For six months, Lockheed experimented with three and four-bladed wooden rotors, but stability was finally achieved by using metal blades in a three-blade configuration and the addition of a gyroscopic control ring connected directly to the swashplate. In the mid-1960s, the helicopter was test flown by a number of government and military agencies, and also the military. The stability offered by the rigid rotor control system made the helicopter easy to fly, and the lessons learned from the CL-475 rigid rotor were later used to develop the Lockheed XH-51 and AH-56 Cheyenne.

In 1975, Lockheed donated the CL-475 to the National Air and Space Museum. The helicopter was loaned to the United States Army Aviation Museum at Fort Rucker, Alabama, but was in the museum's storage as of 2009. Following a restoration, it was placed on display in 2018.

== Specifications ==
Data from

General characteristics

- Crew: 2
- Height: 9 ft 3 in (2.82 m)
- Empty weight: 1,625 lb (737 kg)
- Gross weight: 2,000 lb (907 kg)
- Powerplant: 1 × Lycoming VO-360-A1A four-cylinder air-cooled piston engine , 140 hp (104 kW)
- Main rotor diameter: 32 ft 0 in (9.75 m)

Performance

- Maximum speed: 90 mph (145 km/h, 78 kn)
- Range: 75 mi (120 km, 65 nmi)
- Service ceiling: 2,000 ft (610 m)

== See also ==
Related development

- Lockheed XH-51

Related lists

- List of rotorcraft
