= Company E of the 167th Infantry of the Alabama National Guard Armory =

- U.S. National Register of Historic Places
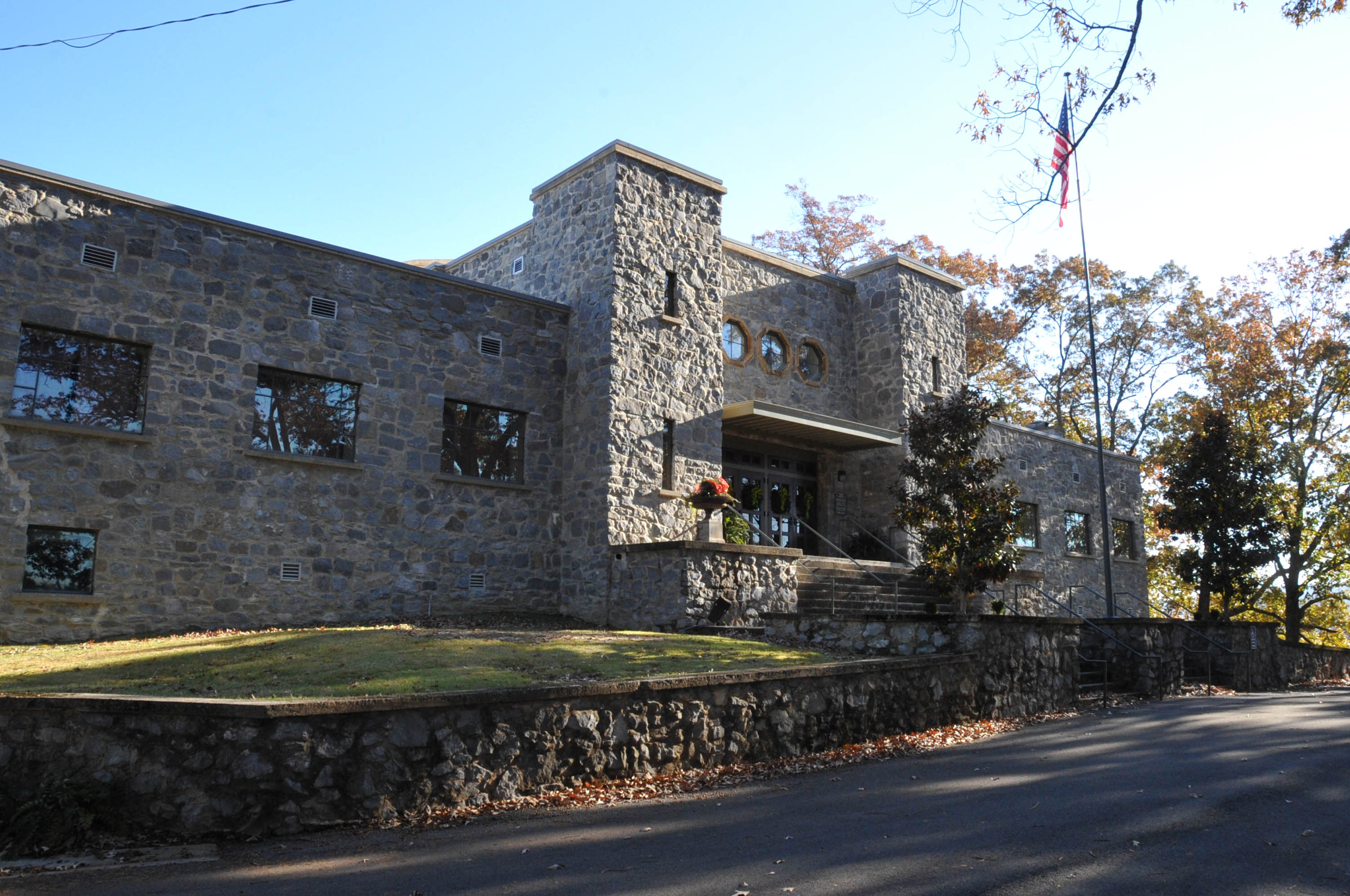
- The armory in May 2008

- Location within Alabama Location within the United States
- Location: 1215 Rayburn Ave., Guntersville, Alabama
- Coordinates: 34°20′58″N 86°18′9″W
- Area: 3.2 acres (1.3 ha)
- Built: 1936
- Built by: Richmond Dunson, Capt. W.D. Newman, Works Progress Administration
- Architectural style: WPA Moderne
- NRHP reference No.: 05000842
- Added to NRHP: August 12, 2005

The Company E of the 167th Infantry of the Alabama National Guard Armory is a historic building in Guntersville, Alabama. The armory was built in 1936 by the Works Progress Administration. It was one of 36 buildings constructed by the WPA for the Alabama National Guard, however its hilltop location, rough limestone block construction, and two towers flanking the main entry give it a castellated style, rather than the Streamline Moderne style of the other state armories. In 1978, the company was dissolved, and the armory was used as a fire station until 1998.

In 2006 it was renovated into the Guntersville Museum, and sits as the centerpiece of a public park, which includes a library and community theater. The building was listed on the National Register of Historic Places in 2005.
