= Skyline Commissary =

- U.S. National Register of Historic Places
- Alabama Register of Landmarks and Heritage
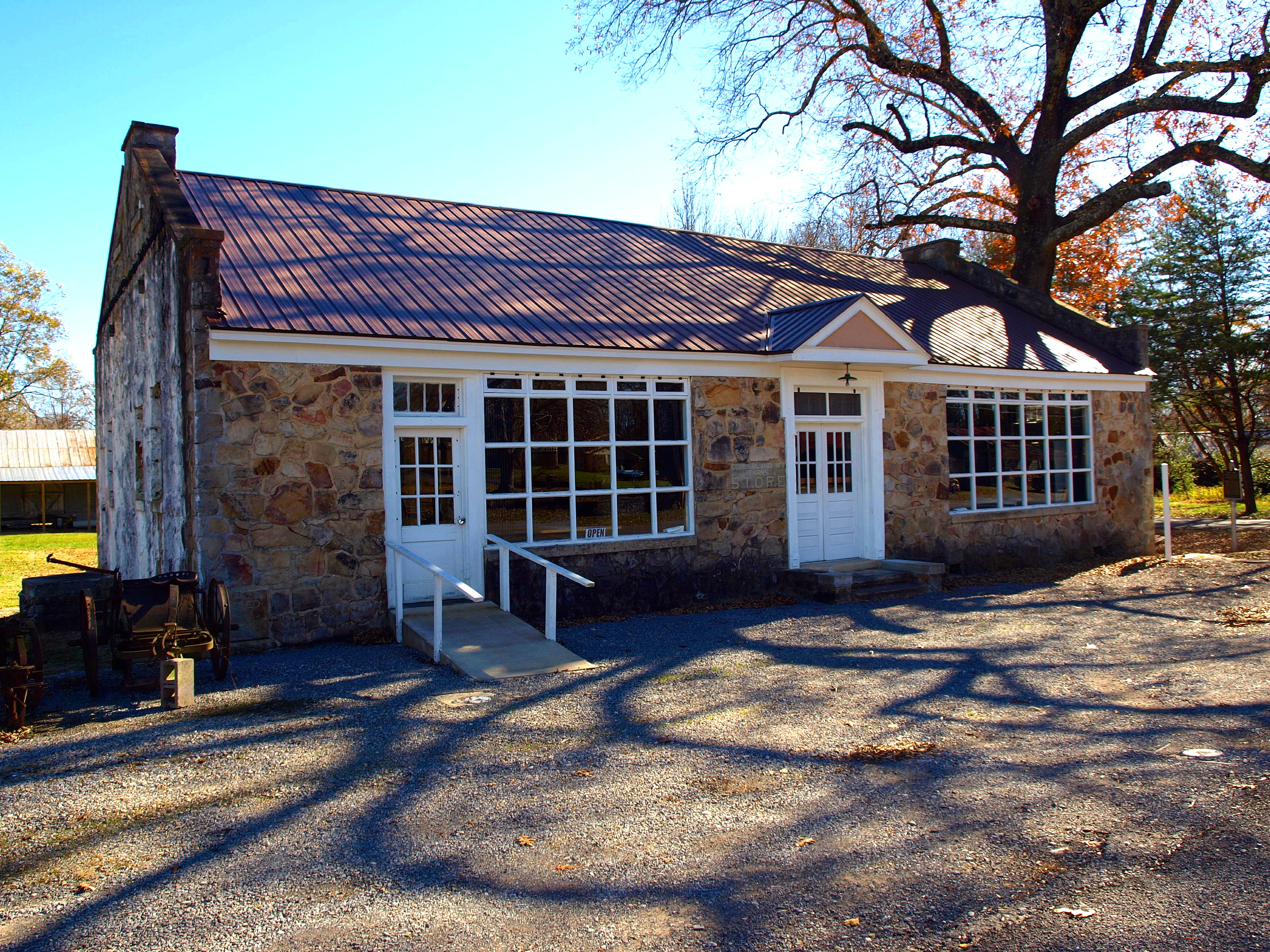
- The building in November 2017

- Location within Alabama Location within the United States
- Location: Northeast corner of the junction of County Roads 25 & 107, Skyline, Alabama
- Coordinates: 34°48′46″N 86°7′27″W
- Built: 1935
- NRHP reference No.: 13000365

Significant dates
- Added to NRHP: June 12, 2013
- Designated ARLH: January 22, 2009

The Skyline Commissary (also known as the Rock Store) is a historic building in Skyline, Alabama, United States. It was built in 1935 as part of Skyline Farms, a project of the Resettlement Administration, a New Deal program that sought to provide jobs for unemployed farmers on collective farms. The commissary sold food to both co-op members and surrounding residents, and served as the hub of social activity for the community. The co-op operated until the end of World War II, when it was sold to private owners. The commissary continued to operate as a general store for the community until the early 2000s. It was converted into a heritage museum in 2005. Like other New Deal structures, the commissary makes heavy use of local materials. The walls are of locally quarried limestone, and the façade features a pedimented portico covering double entry doors. The entry is flanked by two large, multi-paned fixed windows. A gable-roofed ell was added to the north of the rear side in 1937. The house was listed on the National Register of Historic Places in 2013.

The Skyline Farms Heritage Association owns the building and operates it as the Rock Store Museum. It is open on a limited basis.
