= Queen City Pool and Pool House =

- U.S. National Register of Historic Places
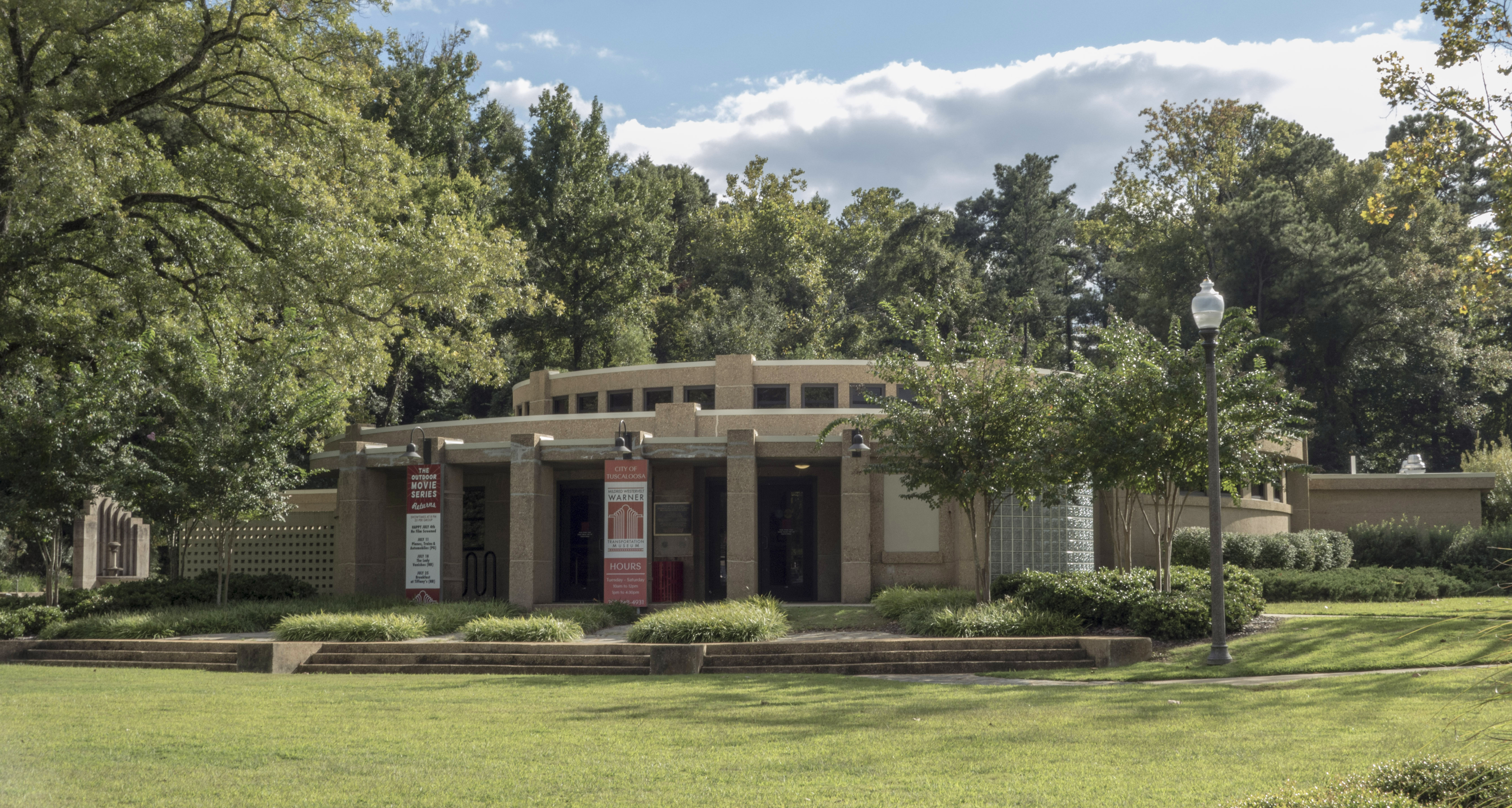
- Queen City Pool and Pool House, junction of Queen City Ave. and Jack Warner Parkway, Tuscaloosa, in 2014.

- Location within Alabama Location within the United States
- Location: Queen City Avenue and Jack Warner Parkway; Tuscaloosa, Alabama
- Coordinates: 33°12′54″N 87°33′47″W
- Area: 11 acres (4.5 ha)
- Built: 1941
- Architect: Don Buel Schuyler
- Architectural style: Art Moderne
- NRHP reference No.: 92001088
- Added to NRHP: September 10, 1992

The Queen City Pool and Pool House, also known as the Queen City Pool, is a historic bathhouse and swimming pool located in Tuscaloosa, Alabama, United States. The bathhouse and pool were added to the National Register of Historic Places on September 9, 1992, due to their architectural and historical significance.

== History ==
Designed by Frank Lloyd Wright's apprentice Don Buel Schuyler, the Queen City Pool operated from 1943 through 1989. It was constructed as a Civil Works Administration/Works Project Administration relief project of the Great Depression. The site features a poured concrete bathhouse, a wading pool and an art deco fountain.

The city of Tuscaloosa constructed two public pools in an era of strict segregation, Gulf States Pool and Queen City, with Queen City being the "whites-only" pool. The pool closed in 1966 when desegregation was mandated. The former swimming pool was filled in with dirt in June 2005.

From 2012 to early 2015, the site of the former pool was used as a temporary public ice rink every holiday season during Tuscaloosa's annual "Holidays on the River" event before it was moved to the Tuscaloosa Amphitheater in late 2015.

== Mildred Westervelt Warner Transportation Museum ==
In May 2005, it was announced that the bathhouse would be converted into a transportation museum. This became possible after the Alabama Department of Transportation awarded the city a grant to convert the facility into a museum illustrating the history of transportation in Tuscaloosa. The financing for the project came from a $1.94 million federal award that required a 20 percent match by the city, or $260,000. The renovation was designed by the Eclectic Group, Inc. of Huntsville and Ward Scott Veron Architects of Tuscaloosa.

On December 13, 2011, the renovated bath house was officially opened as the Mildred Westervelt Warner Transportation Museum. The museum's exhibits traced the city's history through the development of its transportation structures. That museum closed on July 1, 2024. Renovations to the building began in August 2024; it is now the second location of the Kentuck Art Center (which has its main headquarters in Northport).
