= John G. Cullmann =

German-American businessman and activist

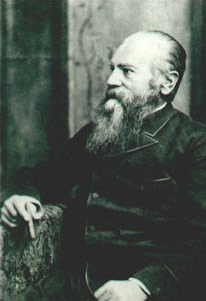
Colonel John Cullmann, founder of Cullman (1823-1895)

John Gottfried Cullmann (July 2, 1823 – December 3, 1895) was a German businessman and political activist who emigrated to the United States as a result of his financial ruin related to participation in the Revolution of 1848. Born in Frankweiler in the Rheinpfalz in what was then the Kingdom of Bavaria, Cullmann was the son of a school principal. At 13, he began attending the Zweibrücken Polytechnic Institute, taking a degree in engineering. He married the daughter of a wealthy banking family, Josephine Low, and settled in the town of Neustadt, founding an export business there.

Cullmann became involved in revolutionary activity in Neustadt during the Revolution of 1848, and following the Bavarian crown's suppression of the rebellion with assistance from the Prussian Army, his business fell apart and he lost much of his wealth. In the years afterwards, he re-established himself but again lost his fortune following speculation during the Dano-Prussian War. Ruined in Germany, he began to look abroad for opportunity. His sights settled on the United States. However, when the American Civil War was ongoing, and fearing conscription, Cullmann temporarily settled in London in 1864. Not wanting to leave her family in Germany, his wife stayed behind.

By 1865, Cullmann had made his way to New York City, the first stop in a series of residences including Philadelphia, Cincinnati, and a number of unsettled regions he was considering as places to establish himself and a small colony for German expatriates like him. In Cincinnati, he was able to establish himself as a lawyer and gathered the money to begin putting his colony together. He finally focused his attention on Alabama, where a proposed settlement near St. Florian in Lauderdale County was rejected by locals. However, through connections with Governor Robert M. Patton, he was able to conclude a deal with the Nashville-Montgomery Railroad in 1872 to purchase a tract of land near the modern day town of Cullman. In total, the land was 350,000 acres (1,400 km^{2}), a vast plot that he quickly began to advertise to German-Americans. The railroad, whose business would benefit as more settlers made their homes along their rail line, made him a land agent and gave him the title of Colonel to reflect the new role.

Cullmann spent the following years recruiting immigrants to settle his lands, beginning with the first 13 families he established the town of Cullmann with in 1873. There were plenty of interested immigrants from the same region as Cullmann, as the events that had precipitated his leaving his homeland had likewise encouraged thousands of his countrymen to seek a new home as well. His leadership brought nearly a thousand new settlers to the area within a few years, something many locals weren't happy with. In one notable instance, a local man stabbed Cullmann in the head during an assassination attempt, an attack he survived but which left a lifelong scar. However, over the next twenty years, he was able to build and incorporate the town of Cullman, Cullman County, and to re-establish himself as a wealthy businessman. He died on December 3, 1895, of pneumonia, leaving behind a small enclave of German settlers in the middle of the American south.

== Name ==
Some sources state that Cullmann had earlier Americanized his name from "Kullmann". Stanley Johnson, his only surviving American descendant, told The Cullman Times in 1998 that there are no German records indicating "Kullmann", and that "Cullmann" was always the correct spelling.)
