= Alabama Constitution Village =

Alabama Constitution Hall Park
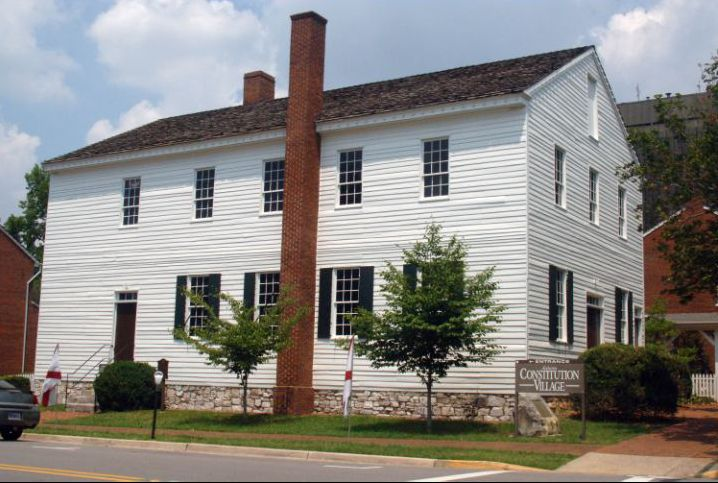

- Location within Alabama
- 34.72862°N 86.58737°W
- Location: Huntsville, Alabama

Site notes
- Governing body: City

Alabama Register of Landmarks and Heritage
- Official name: Constitution Hall Park
- Designated: October 31, 1975

Constitution Hall Park is an open-air museum in Huntsville, Alabama, that showcases life in 1819. It is a recreated site, found during an archaeological dig in the 1970's. The site has four buildings that were restored on their original foundations: Constitution Hall, the Clay building, the Boardman Complex, and the Neal House. The buildings include a blacksmith's shop, library, law office, print shop, land surveyor's office, post office, cabinetmaker's shop, and residence. It was added to the Alabama Register of Landmarks and Heritage on October 31, 1975.

On July 5, 1819, in the vacant cabinet shop, forty-four delegates came together to form the Constitutional convention to inaugurate Alabama as the twenty-second state. Alabama Constitution Hall Park is part of the Earlyworks Museums, along with the EarlyWorks Children's Museum.

== Events ==
The Alabama Constitution Village used to host an annual Santa's Village event, which was named the Alabama event of the Year in 2006. In 2004 and 2005 the event was cited as a Top 20 event by the Southeastern Tourism Society. Now, that event has changed to 12 Nights of Santa, hosted at EarlyWorks Children's Museum. Yearly events include Death at the Park, Lantern Tours, Cask & Cork Bourbon Tasting, Homeschool Days, and special public tours throughout the year.
