= Gulf Coast Exploreum Science Center =

Coordinates: 30°41′25″N 88°2′24.1″W

Exploreum Science Center
- Former name: Gulf Coast Exploreum Science Center
- Established: 1983
- Location: 65 Government Street; Mobile, Alabama, USA
- Type: Science Museum
- Visitors: 100,000
- Director: Don Comeaux
- Website: https://www.exploreum.com/

The Gulf Coast Exploreum Science Center (now known simply as Exploreum Science Center) is a non-profit science center that promotes science learning through a variety of activities, including exhibits, Digital Dome movies, demonstrations, workshops and teacher professional development. Located in downtown Mobile, Alabama, Exploreum has several permanent galleries including Hands On Hall, the Wharf of Wonder, and Curiosity Factory. The Exploreum also features interactive traveling exhibits, year-round with broad science content and supplementary, themed educational programming.

== History ==
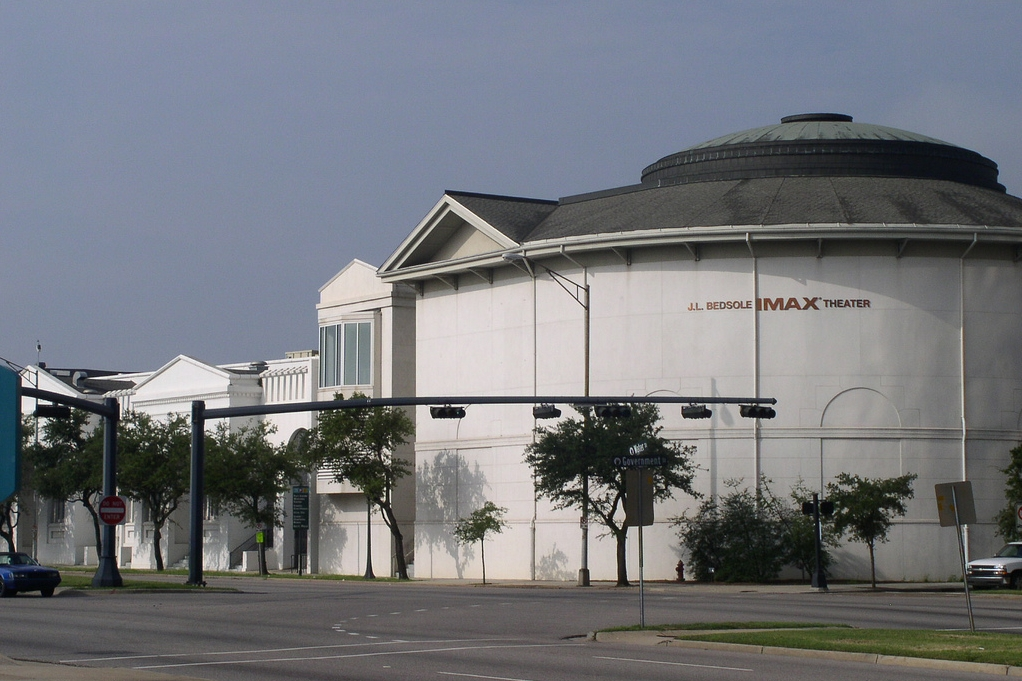
The Exploreum from Water Street.

In 1976 the Junior League of Mobile provided funding for research and development of a hands-on interactive museum for the children of Mobile, with this initial commitment directly leading to the creation of The Explore Center, Inc., a private, non-profit educational incorporation, and a board of trustees. The board eventually raised $1.3 million to build a 10,000-square-foot (929 m^{2}) contemporary building on Springhill Avenue adjacent to the Bragg-Mitchell Mansion, and the Gulf Coast Exploreum "Museum of Science" was opened in 1983. That site was outgrown within 4 years and in 1987 a Relocation Committee was formed and determined that Mobile's historic downtown area would be well suited for an expanded, state of the art science center and IMAX theater. A capital campaign was launched at this time with the procurement of corporate and individual contributions and commitments by officials at the city, county and federal level. After 11 years of planning and 3 years of construction, the new facility situated on Government Street between Royal and Water streets was opened in 1998 and is now suited for people of all ages.

== Exhibits ==
Inside MyBodyWorks.

The Exploreum is home to several permanent galleries including Hands On Hall, the Wharf of Wonder, and Curiosity Factory. My BodyWorks opened Winter 2009 and was an interactive exhibit, custom designed for the Exploreum. A community project presented by Infirmary Health Foundation, it was dedicated to human health and workforce development. My BodyWorks also featured a biology lab where science educators presented materials that delved further into the topics presented in the gallery. My BodyWorks closed in Summer 2025.

The Hands On Hall is the Exploreum's original exhibit gallery and contains more than 20 interactive exhibits. The Wharf of Wonder is a community project of the Junior League of Mobile.

The Exploreum hosts a variety of traveling exhibits. Past traveling exhibits have included "Mysteries of Egypt: Wonderful Treasures from the Pharaoh's Tomb" in 2001, "China! 7,000 Years of Innovation" in 2002, "International Space Station" in 2003, "The Brain: It's All In Your Head" in 2004, "The Dead Sea Scrolls" in 2005, "Mummy: The Inside Story" in 2006, and "A Day in Pompeii" in 2007. In 2008, the Exploreum hosted "Our Body: The Universe Within", featuring actual human plastinated bodies. In 2009 "Bob the Builder - Project Built It", "Sea Lion Splash" in 2010, and "Kangaroo Kraze" in 2011, featuring live kangaroos, all came to the Exploreum. In 2019 "Genghis Khan: The Great Civilizer" displayed over 400 artifacts, costumes, weaponry and featured live performances by Mongolian artisans.

== Features ==
The J.L. Bedsole IMAX Dome Theater has featured IMAX films ranging from "Everest" in 1998 to "Wired to Win: Surviving the Tour De France" in 2008. The theater also remains the only domed IMAX theater on the Gulf Coast. The Ciba Lab allows visitors to participate in science demonstrations, or just observe from the amphitheater style seating.
