= Huntsville Depot =

- Southern Railway System Depot
- U.S. National Register of Historic Places
- Alabama Register of Landmarks and Heritage
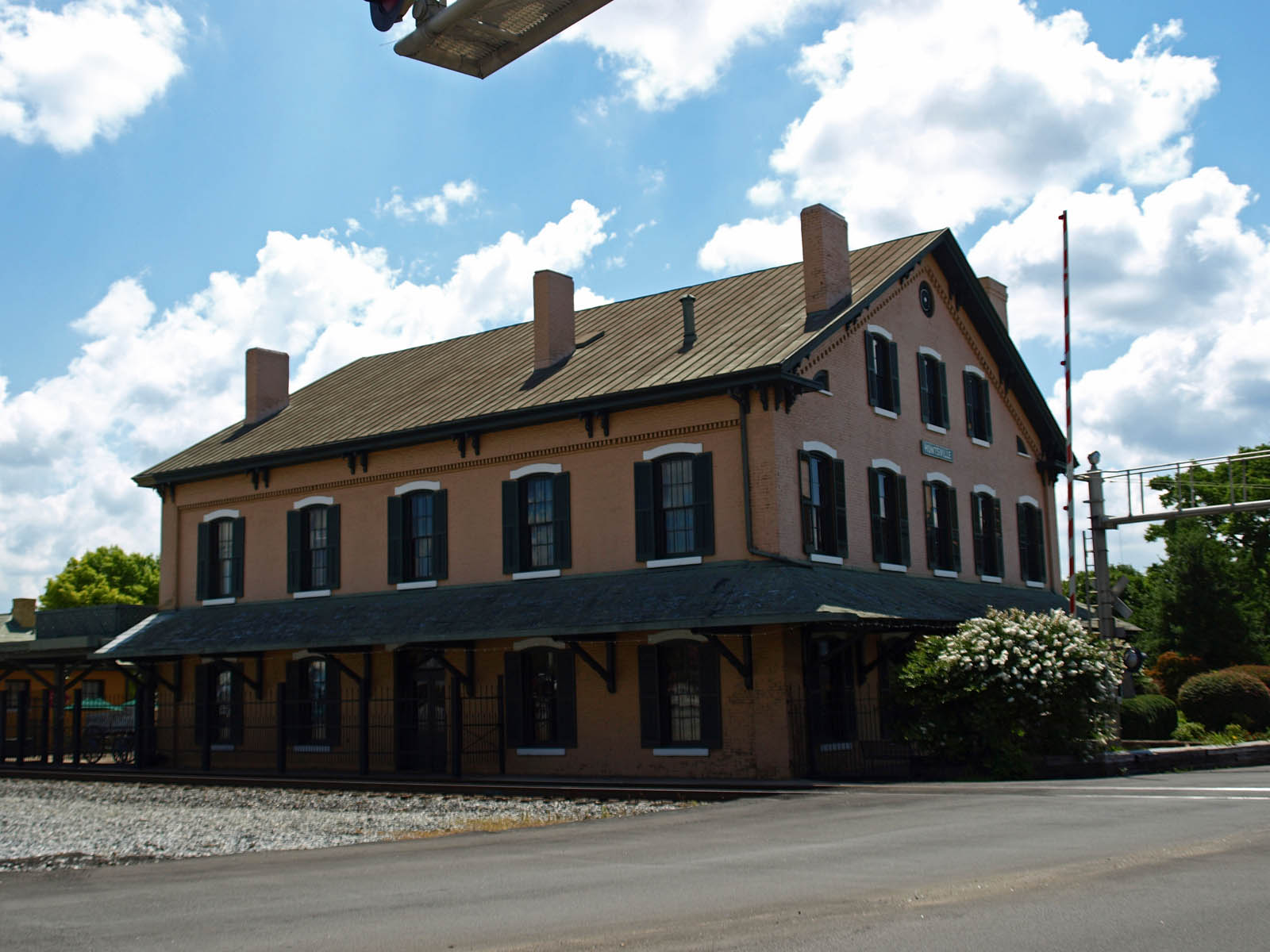
- The depot in July 2010

- Location within Huntsville, Alabama Location within Alabama Location within the United States
- Location: 330 Church St., Huntsville, Alabama
- Coordinates: 34°44′4″N 86°35′27″W
- Area: 2.8 acres (1.1 ha)
- Built: 1860
- NRHP reference No.: 71000101

Significant dates
- Added to NRHP: September 10, 1971
- Designated ARLH: June 25, 2002

The Huntsville Depot located on the Norfolk Southern Railway line in downtown Huntsville is the oldest surviving railroad depot in Alabama and one of the oldest in the United States. Completed in 1860, the depot served as eastern division headquarters for the Memphis and Charleston Railroad. It is listed on both the Alabama Register of Landmarks and Heritage and National Register of Historic Places.

Huntsville was occupied by Union forces in 1862 during the Civil War as a strategic point on the railroad and the depot was used as a prison for Confederate soldiers. Graffiti left by the soldiers can still be seen on the walls. The Huntsville Depot saw its last regularly scheduled passenger train, Southern Railway's The Tennessean, on March 30, 1968. The Depot served for at time as a museum, part of the Early Works Museum. In October 2024, museum officials said they were no longer involved with operations and the property had been returned to the control of the City of Huntsville, which was considering options for the building.

A 0-4-0 Porter steam locomotive that was built in Pittsburgh in 1904 resides outside of the museum.

== See also ==
- Alabama Constitution Village
- North Alabama Railroad Museum
- List of museums in Alabama
- List of transport museums

Preceding station	Southern Railway	Following station
Madison toward Memphis	Memphis – Bristol	Chase toward Bristol
Preceding station	Nashville, Chattanooga and St. Louis Railway	Following station
Chase toward Elora	Elora-Gadsden	Hobbs Island toward Gadsden
