= Portrait of Saint Bartley Harris =

Painting by Maria Howard Weeden

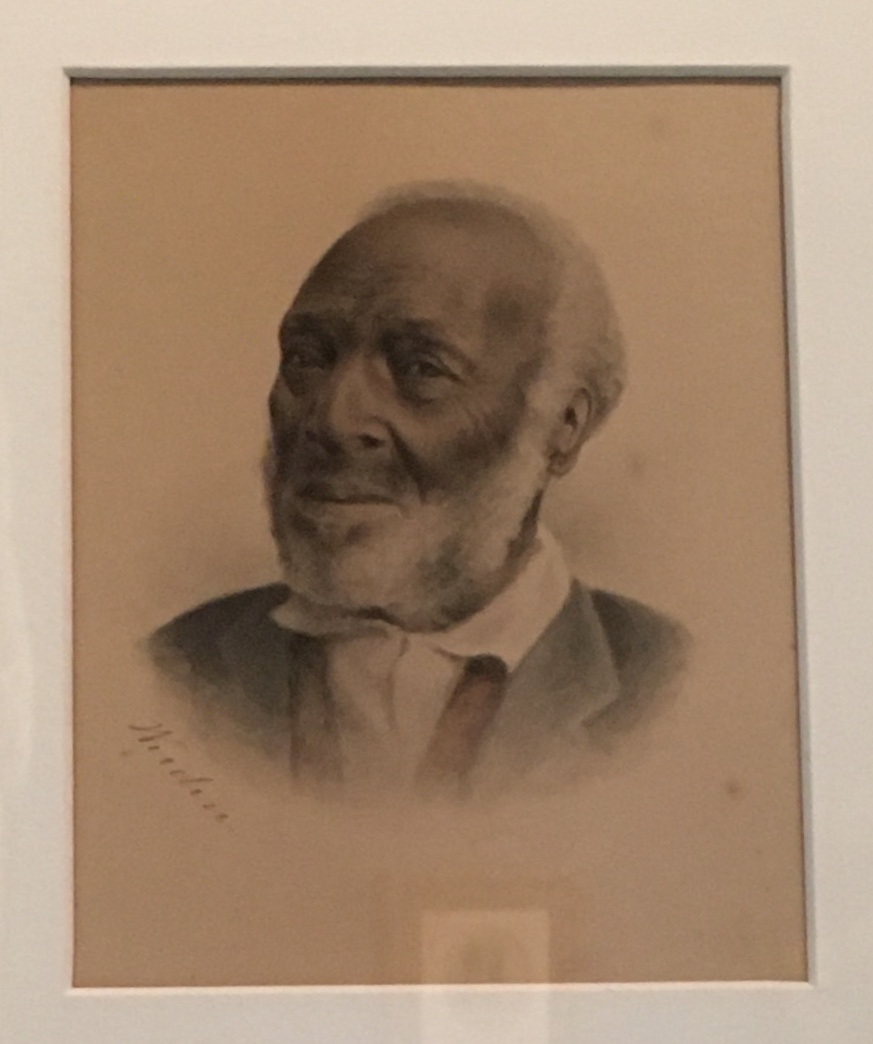
Portrait of Saint Bartley Harris

The Portrait of Saint Bartley Harris is a late-nineteenth-century watercolor portrait of Bartley Harris by Maria Howard Weeden, an artist from Huntsville, Alabama. Harris was the second known leader of what became the Saint Bartley Primitive Baptist Church.

== Subject and context ==
Maria Howard Weeden was an artist who painted local flora and landscapes, illustrated greeting cards, illuminated poems, and taught children's art classes in her own home, but who is best remembered today for her portraits of African Americans including Saint Bartley.

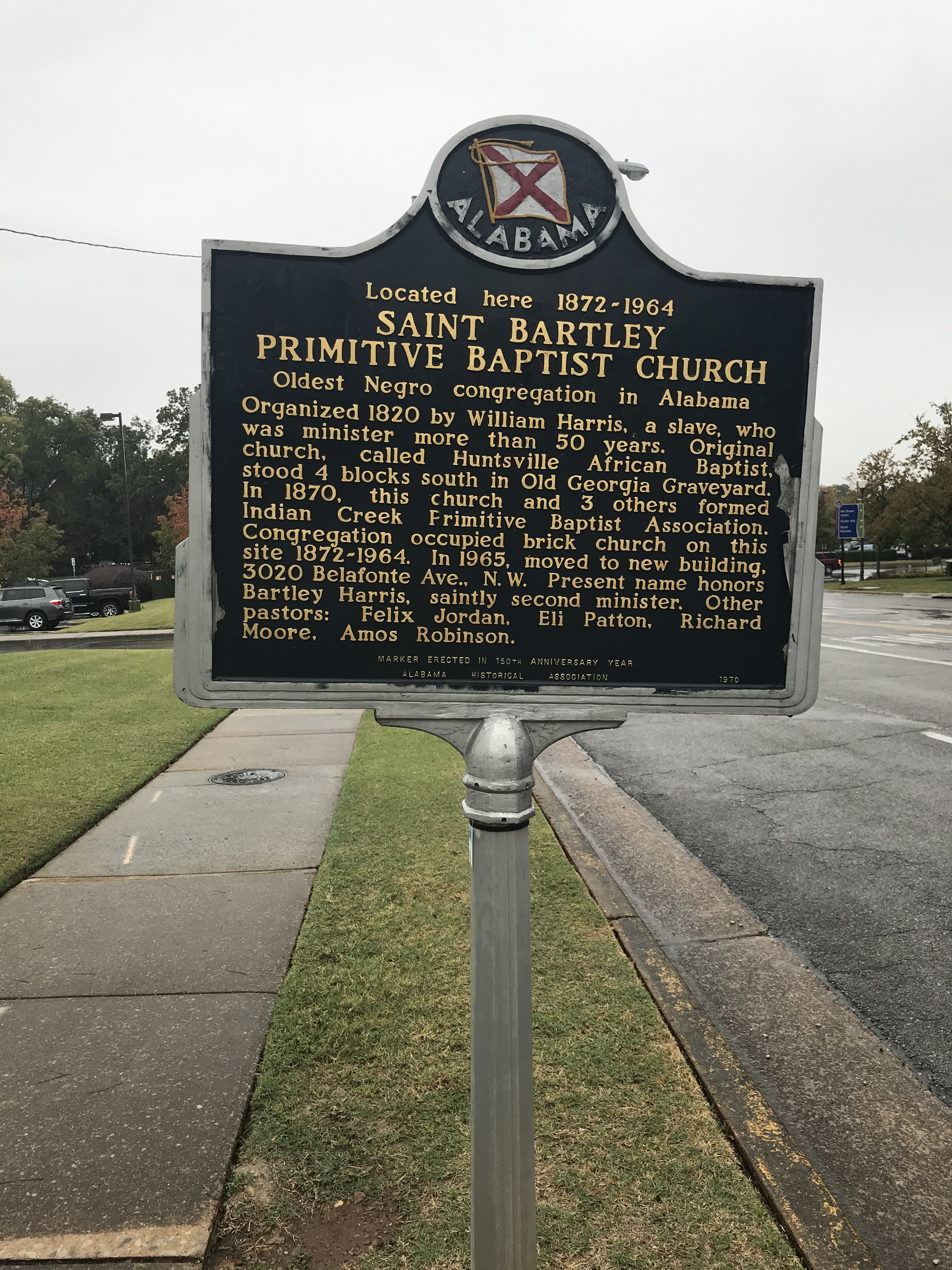
Historic Marker for Saint Bartley Primitive Baptist Church

Weeden was a white woman living in the postbellum South who chose to paint Saint Bartley and other African American individuals. Many of the individuals she painted remain unnamed, as they were freedmen and women who worked for her family or neighboring families in positions such as cooks and gardeners after the Civil War, but Saint Bartley is an exception. Bartley Harris was a prominent and influential public figure for both African Americans and whites in late-nineteenth-century Huntsville who was known for his massive baptisms in Huntsville's “Big Spring” and for his hiding of local Confederates’ valuables in his church during the Civil War. He was an instrumental figure in the early history of the Huntsville African Baptist Church (he served as its second pastor), which survives today as Saint Bartley Primitive Baptist Church, Alabama's oldest African American congregation. Harris’ local prominence may be one of the reasons that Hugh Walker, in his 1962 newspaper article “’Shadows on the Wall’: Howard Who Was a Girl,” labeled Weeden’s portrait of Saint Bartley Harris one of her most well-known.

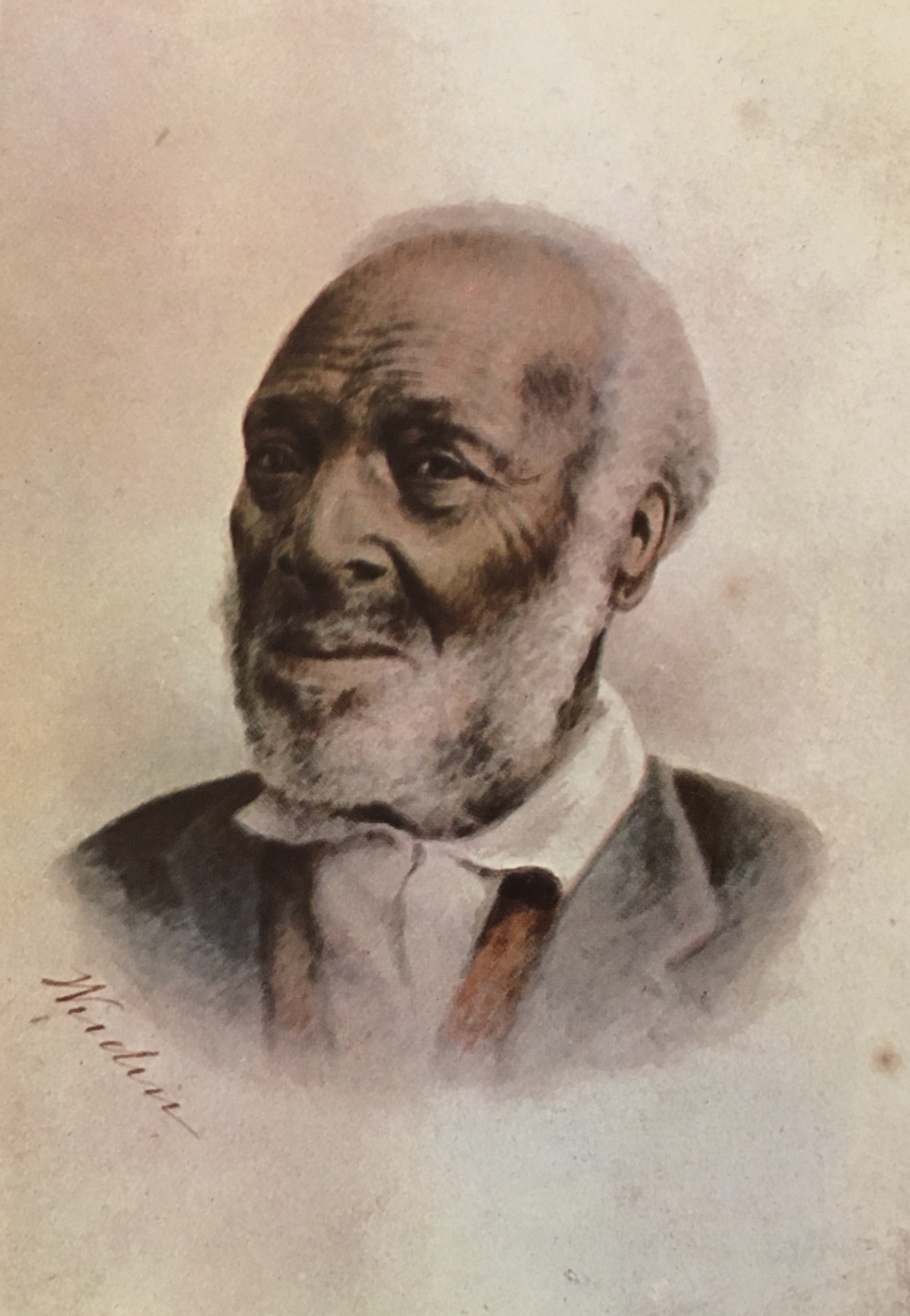
Printed Reproduction of Portrait of Saint Bartley Harris

== Medium and style ==
Weeden’s portrait of Saint Bartley Harris, like the majority of her portraits, is a watercolor. This portrait highlights Weeden’s facility in creating nearly photographic images often less than six inches tall and made of lines so delicate they are nearly indistinguishable. The intricate brushwork in this painting is often attributed to her extreme nearsightedness and her use of a brush with only three bristles. Weeden’s interest in portraiture likely originated in her artistic training with William Frye, a well-known portrait artist in North Alabama who began instructing Weeden when she was eleven. This early childhood instruction and some additional guidance at female seminaries in Huntsville and Tuskegee, however, constituted the entirety of Weeden’s training. This lack of extensive formal training led to the need for her to experiment in method and technique---experimentation that Alabama historians Frances C. Roberts and Sarah Huff Fisk suggested contributed to the uniqueness and originality of her medium (small watercolor portraits) and style. The style in which Saint Bartley Harris is rendered starkly contrasts common representations of African Americans in the late nineteenth and early twentieth centuries. As opposed to typical caricatured, minstrel show depictions of African Americans from the period, Weeden’s portrait highlights Harris’ identity as an individual with dignity and humanity. Weeden's interest in naturalistic and realistic representations of African Americans grew after she attended the World's Columbian Exhibition in Chicago in September 1873, where she herself had a small exhibit. At the Columbian Exhibition, Weeden viewed caricatured and demeaning depictions of African Americans by contemporary artists including Edward W. Kemble and Arthur B. Frost, and she returned to Huntsville with a series of new commissions and an increased dedication to her mission of fair and realistic artistic representation, as exemplified in her realistic portrait of Saint Bartley.

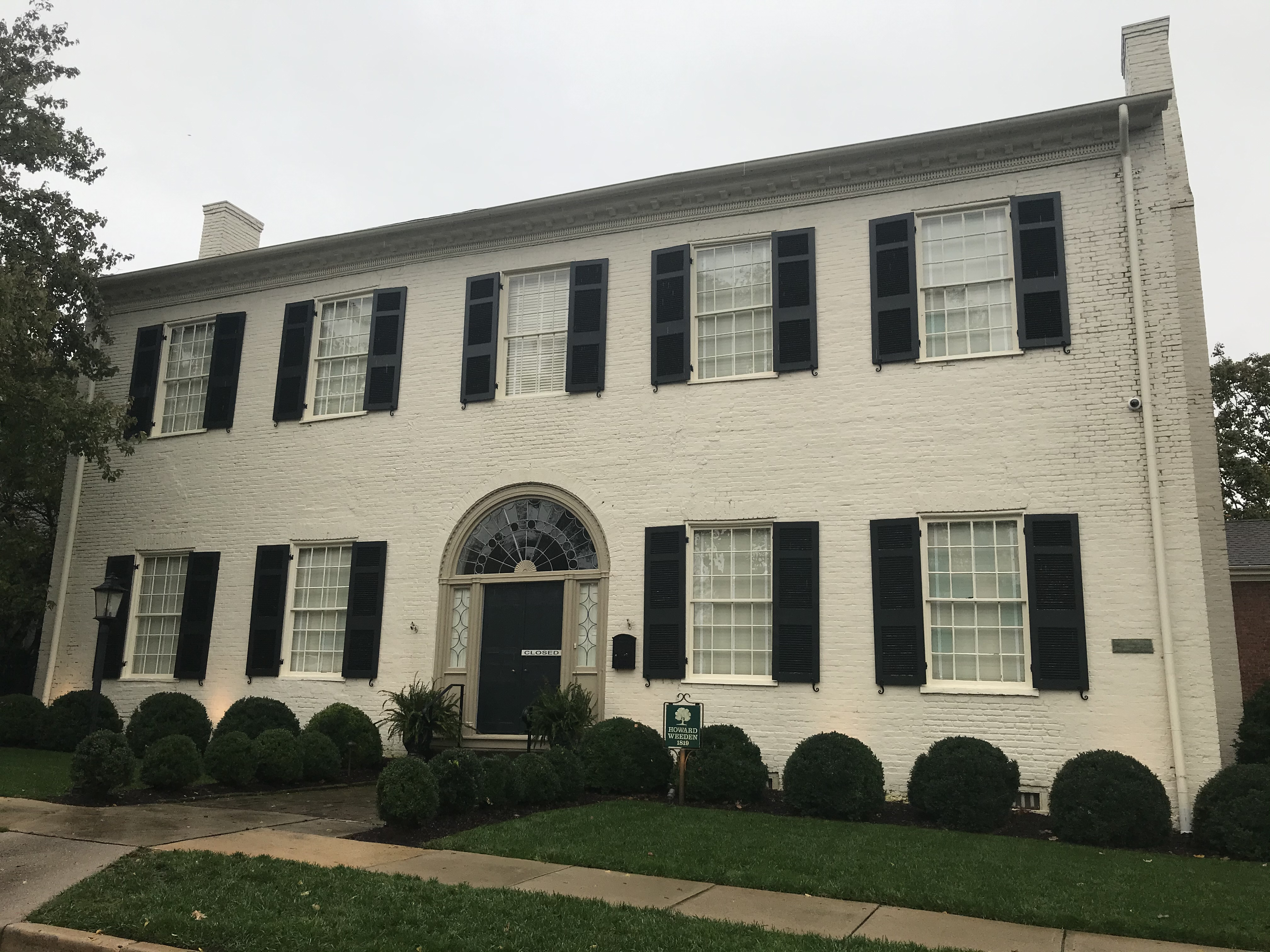
The Weeden House, now home to the Weeden House Museum

== Exhibition and reception ==
The portrait of Saint Bartley Harris is unique in that it was not one of Weeden's many portraits of African Americans included in her illustrated volumes of poetry, four of which were published between 1898 and 1904. Her portrait of St. Bartley Harris in fact had an unusually broad and cosmopolitan audience; it was one of only seven of her paintings exhibited in Berlin, Germany, in 1896, where it was reportedly well received. This exhibition was facilitated by Weeden's Nashville friend Elizabeth Price, who played an instrumental role in promoting and disseminating Weeden's works at home and abroad. Elizabeth Price showed Weeden's painting of Saint Bartley Harris along with six other portraits to Edward Schulte, a gallery owner in Berlin, and after he offered to display her paintings, Price wrote back home to several Alabama and Tennessee newspapers, describing the gallery where the paintings were hung and recounting their positive reception, thereby earning Weeden additional fame and commissions.

Weeden's portrait of St. Bartley hangs in her historic home which has been converted to the Weeden House Museum in the Twickenham Historic District of Huntsville, Alabama.

== In popular culture ==
The enduring importance of Weeden's portrait of St. Bartley Harris in the Saint Bartley Primitive Baptist Church community, as well as in the larger Huntsville community, remains clear in continued media coverage. The portrait appeared in a 2016 article published on St. Bartley Harris by Huntsville's local news channel, WHNT News 19, and was also featured in a 2018 video on the history of St. Bartley Primitive Baptist Church in anticipation of the congregation's celebration of its bicentennial in 2020.
