= Saint Bartley Primitive Baptist Church =

Church in Huntsville, Alabama, USA

Coordinates: 34.7421°N 86.6181°W

Saint Bartley Primitive Baptist Church is a historic Baptist church in Huntsville, Alabama. Bartley Harris (1800 - 1896) served as its minister. He is renowned for refusing to disclose the whereabouts of valuables he hid for his Confederate neighbors and for his mass baptisms in "Big Spring".

== History ==
The congregation was established decades before the Civil War and held services in various places including at a graveyard for enslaved African Americans. The congregation was led by William Harris, who was a slave. The site is now part of Huntsville Hospital's parking lot.

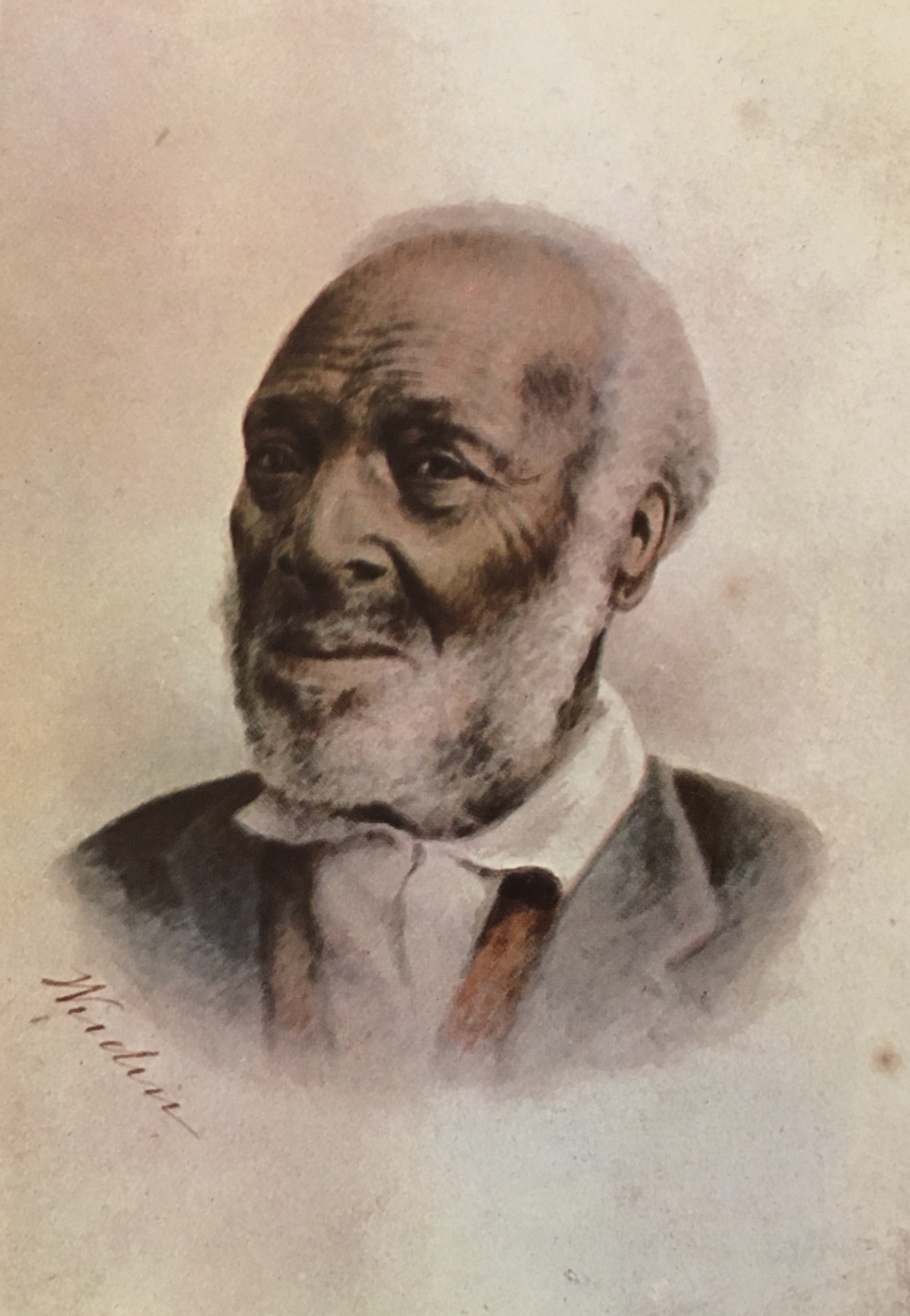
Printed reproduction of Portrait of Saint Bartley Harris by Maria Howard Weeden

A church was eventually built. It was burned down reportedly after Bartley Harris refused to inform Union Army soldiers on the location of valuables he had hidden for his Confederate neighbors. Ulysses S. Grant reportedly aided in building a new church for Harris' congregation. In 1872, the new church was constructed at Oak Avenue, later renamed William Avenue.

Saint Bartley Primitive Baptist Church was torn down in 1964 for an urban renewal project and rebuilt on Belafonte Avenue with part of the altar and some stained glass windows preserved.

== Legacy ==
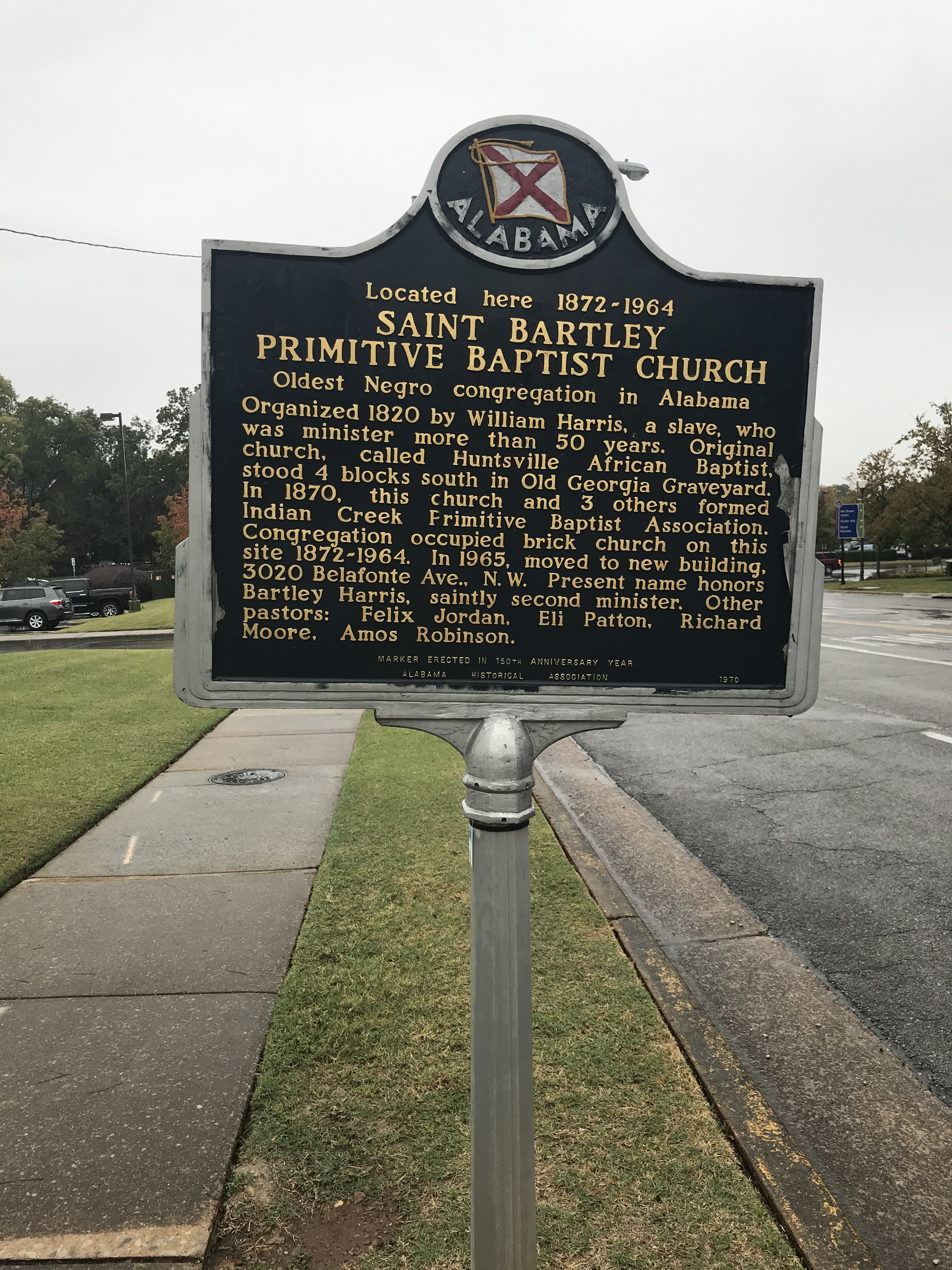
Historic Marker for Saint Bartley Primitive Baptist Church

A historical marker commemorates the church's history by its 1872 to 1964 site. In 2020 the congregation celebrated its bicentennial.
