= Harvie P. Jones =

Architect and preservationist (1930–1998)

Harvie P. Jones (June 9, 1930 –1998) was an architect and author who worked to document and preserve historic buildings in Alabama. He was based in Huntsville, Alabama and was considered to be the city's best known architect. He was a partner at the firm Jones & Herrin Architects/Interior Design and did restoration work on historic buildings. The University of Alabama in Huntsville has a collection of his papers and photographs.

He helped establish the Twickenham and Old Town historic districts in Huntsville and the Historic Huntsville Foundation. Frances Roberts and Jones produced the TARCOG Preliminary Historical - Architectural Survey Of Alabama Counties in 1974. Within the city he was involved with the design or restoration of: Alabama Constitution Hall Village, the Huntsville Depot, Huntsville City Hall and the Weeden House. He also helped restore the Lowry House in Huntsville and was involved with the preservation of the church that later became the University's Union Grove Gallery.

He created slide show presentations on various subjects of Alabama's historic architecture and made extensive documentation. He also worked in Savannah, Georgia, Tennessee, and elsewhere. In Savannah he worked for Mills Lane IV on restoration projects.

He was married to Marilyn M. Jones and had several children.

== Publishings ==
- "Enhancement of Historic Photographs" (1979)
