= William Frye (painter) =

American painter

- Born: September 13, 1822; Breslau, Kingdom of Prussia
- Died: July 1, 1872 (aged 49); Tuscaloosa, Alabama, U.S.
- Occupation: Painter

George Wilhelm ("William") Frye (September 13, 1822 – July 1, 1872) was a Kingdom of Prussia-born American painter. His artwork can be seen at the Huntsville Museum of Art.

== Early Life and Family ==
Much of Frye's biography was recounted as oral history by his daughter Minnie Frye Coleman, which has resulted in some conflicting details about his early life. Born in Breslau, Germany, in 1822 (or 1819, according to his daughter), Frye was raised in Vienna, where his father was a cloth manufacturer. He moved to Prague, where he attended university (other sources state he attended Heidelberg University). It is unclear whether Frye was trained as a classical artist during his time at university or whether he was self-taught. He had a brother, Christopher, who was an officer in the Austrian army, and a sister Ida, who married the son of composer Joseph Lanner. Inspired by the tales of Native Americans in the works of James Fenimore Cooper, Frye left Bremen for New York in 1841, where his cousin "Count Johann Schmidt, the German Consul of New York" gave him a letter of introduction to George D. Prentice of Louisville, Kentucky, who reportedly gave him business advice. He likely stayed in New York for a year to paint portraits but by 1845 Frye moved to Louisville, Kentucky, where his first studio was located on Market St. He remained active in Louisville until 1848.

By March 1847 William Frye opened a second studio in Huntsville, Alabama, at the Bell Tavern. In 1848, Frye married Virginia Catherine Hale, in Huntsville, Alabama, and they had at least four children (six in his obituary): Ida, Katie, Minnie and Willie. He tutored the prominent Huntsville portraitist and poet Maria Howard Weeden, while she was a young girl of ten.

William Frye lived in Huntsville from March 1847 until his death in 1872, becoming a naturalized citizen in 1854, and remained a prominent local portraitist in the city during this period. He traveled throughout Alabama, Tennessee and Arkansas painting portraits, landscapes, and historical scenes. Frye's reputation increased during the early 1850s, and he moved his portrait studio several times to more prominent locations near the town square. Frye navigated the devastation of the Civil War, reducing his fees by 25% to accommodate the difficult economic times and hardships of the war. After the war, there was little business for portraitists, and both his health and finances suffered. Frye had conditions matching diabetes, which contributed to a stroke in 1869, which distorted his paintings. He continued working and traveling until 1870, but he was no longer able to paint effectively. Frye suffered another stroke in 1871, developed violent behavior, and his wife committed him to the Alabama Insane Hospital in Tuscaloosa. On July 1st, 1872, Frye died and was buried in grave 662 in the hospital cemetery (New Cemetery).

== Artistic output ==
William Frye was a prolific itinerant artist (referred to as a "limner"), who is believed to have created 135-140+ paintings during his career. Only about 47 of his paintings are signed, and he typically signed the backs of his portraits. Many of his paintings are in private collections, although some are housed in the Huntsville Museum of Art, including Frye's portrait of Ellie Lowe.

Frye primarily painted prominent politicians and families from Alabama, but during the war, he also painted departing soldiers and veterans returning from the war as "heroes." During the Civil War and reconstruction, he catered to Union soldiers stationed in Huntsville, who wanted to send portraits back to their families. Frye painted portraits of Jefferson Davis, Leroy Pope Walker (and his wife and children), Clement Clay, Virginia Clay-Clopton, Confederate Generals Robert E. Lee, John Hunt Morgan, Stonewall Jackson, Nathan Bedford Forrest (all lost portraits), and Sallie Ward of Louisville, Kentucky (lost). In the 1860s Frye won a competition to paint a large, posthumous portrait of Henry Clay, which still hangs in the state capitol.

Frye's art was influenced by the emerging technology of photography, and he advertised his ability to paint life-sized portraits, including posthumous images from daguerreotypes. Daguerreotypes likely influenced his portraiture in the 1850s and 1860s, which are often flat, featuring bright faced sitters occupying most of the frame with little backlighting, and emphasis on lace, jewelry and fabric textures. The sitters often hold personal artifacts. Frye's early portraits and portraits of children feature less realism, and his pallette was less colorful after the Civil War.

Frye reportedly painted several landscape scenes, including those of the Huntsville Big Spring, Demopolis and Selma, which were featured in the exhibit "From Southern Shores to Northern Vales" at the Montgomery Museum of Art in 2019-2020. Some of the landscape paintings attributed to Frye include Alabama River at Selma, a signed landscape painting at the Weeden Museum in Huntsville and the version of Big Spring in the collection of the Huntsville Museum of Art.

Big Spring

Possibly Lyon children (Marie, Sophie)

== Known or attributed paintings ==
1. Samuel Aldridge
2. Mrs. Samuel Aldridge nee' Emma Barton
3. Dr. William Cincinnatus Ashe
4. Mrs. James P. Ashford nee' Catherine James Bradford
5. Mrs. William Bankhead nee' Maris Watkins
6. Armstead Barton
7. Mrs. Armstead Barton nee' Amanda Cook
8. Barton Children (Emma and William)
9. Captain John Richards Bealle and wife Virginia Caroline King
10. Benajah Smith Bibb
11. Sarah Elizabeth Binford
12. Cornelia Binford
13. Mrs. Henry D. Blair nee' Mary Louisa Saunder
14. Blair and Saunders Children (Elizabeth Saunderrs, Ellen Virginia Saunders, Lawrence Watkins Saunders)
15. Joseph Bennett Bradford II
16. Mrs. Joseph Bennett Bradford II nee' Martha Hays Patton Smith
17. Mrs. James Hill Branch nee' Mary Elizabeth Watkins "Flower Hill"
18. Gottlieb Breitling
19. Mary Catherine Breitling
20. Mrs. James Lawrence Burt nee' Catherine Baker Winston
21. Septimus Douglas Cabaniss
22. Cabaniss Children (Lucy, Septimus Douglas Cabaniss, Jr., Ellen Douglas)
23. William J. Carloss
24. Clement Comer Clay
25. Clement Comer Clay
26. Clement Clay, Jr. at the foot of Big Spring*
27. Henry Clay
28. John Withers Clay
29. Susannah Clay with her son John Withers Clay*
30. Virginia Clay-Clopton
31. Mrs. John Wesley Cooper nee' Eliza Hall Thomas
32. Timothy Gillette Cornish
33. Mrs. Cornish nee' Louisa Jane Cunningham Torbert
34. Col. Clinton DeWitt Davis*
35. Jefferson Davis*
36. Julia Davis
37. Rev. Robert Donnell
38. Andrew Joel Drake
39. Rev. Alexander Rogers Erwin
40. Robert Fearn, Sr.
41. Mary Collier Ferguson
42. Mrs. Frederick F. Ferguson nee' Lucinda Hale
43. Rev. Frederick Guthrie Ferguson
44. Nathan Bedford Forrest*
45. Mrs. Ephraim Foster*
46. Mrs. William Frye nee' Virginia Catherine Hale
47. Wiliam Willis Garth
48. Mrs. Allen Glover nee' Mary Ann Diven
49. Williamson Allen Glover
50. Mrs. Williamson Allen Glover nee' Amelia Tillman Walton
51. Glover Daughters (Sarah Louise, Elizabeth Tillman, Alethia Davenport)
52. Mrs. Robert Atlas Goodloe nee' Mary Lane
53. Goodloe Children (Sarah Louise, Mary)
54. Goodloe Children (Robert Atlas, Susan Turner, James Mahoon)
55. Thomas Uriah Green
56. Mrs. Green nee' Martisha Rogers
57. Minor Winn and Mrs. Mourning Smith Gracey
58. Capt. Frank B. Gurley
59. William Hale
60. Confederate Officer Hale*
61. Daniel Harris
62. Eliza Gray Bentley Harris
63. John Woodson Henley
64. Mrs. Henley nee' Evalina Thomas Harwell
65. Herstein Children (Rosa, Lina, Monroe)
66. Rodah Horton
67. Mrs. Horton nee' Lucy A. M.
68. Dr. James Madison Huston
69. Mrs. Huston nee' Annie Barton Huston
70. Huston Children (Henry Barton, James Madison Jr.)
71. James Bennington Irvine
72. Mrs. Irvine nee' Virginia P. Foster
73. Morgan "Stonewall" Jackson*
74. Mrs. Harry Warren Kimball nee' Anne Eliza Gamble
75. William Rufus King
76. Isaac Lane and Mary Pride Lane, servant Noah, horse, Henry Clay, and poodle, Venus
77. Robert E. Lee*
78. General Logan*
79. Mrs. Logan and Children*
80. Jefferson Love
81. George Gaines Lyon
82. Mrs. Lyon nee' Anne Gaines Glover
83. Mrs. George Gaines Lyon and Children (Mary Glover, Rosa Fisher, Susan Diven)
84. Lyon Children (Mary, Sophie)
85. John Lewis Malone
86. Robert Nashville Malone
87. Martin Brothers "Death of a Soldier"
88. Joel Early Matthews
89. Mrs. Matthews nee' Elizabeth Woods Poage
90. Lucy Ann Spotswood Matthews
91. William McBride
92. Alexander Keith Marshall McDowell
93. Mrs. Anna McDowell
94. McDowell Children (Joseph Sebastian and Keith Marshall)
95. General McPherson*
96. The Reverend Henry Mitchell
97. Dr. Alfred Moore
98. Mrs. Moore nee' Olivia
99. Mrs. Edward Munford*
100. George Neal
101. Annie Neal
102. William Patton
103. Mrs. Patton nee' Martha Lee Hays
104. Mrs. Andrew Jackson Perdue nee' Sallie Lula Carter
105. Mrs. John Phinizy nee' Elmire Watkins
106. Mrs. Joab Pinson nee' Caroline Matilda Dunn
107. Richardson Children (William Patton, James, John Patton)
108. Mrs. Benjamin Serrod Ricks nee' Eliza Barry Ricks
109. John Watson Rutland
110. Mrs. Samuel Strudwick nee' Sophia Moore
111. Mrs. John Watson nee' Margaret Ann Barton
112. Mrs. John Watson nee' Hannah Maria Barton
113. Reuben Seay
114. Mrs. Seay nee' Anne McGhee
115. Lucy Spotsware
116. General Stanley*
117. George Gilliam Steele
118. Unknown Girl
119. Unknown Woman
120. General Leroy Pope Walker
121. Sally Ward*
122. Paul J. Watkins "Flower Hill"
123. Major Robert H. Watkins
124. Mrs. Watkins nee' Prudence Thompson Oliver
125. Whitfield Children (James Bryan, Bryan, George)
126. Isaac Winston
127. Mrs. Winston nee' Catherine Baker Jones
128. William E. Woodruff, Sr.
129. Mrs. William Woodruff nee' Jane Eliza Mills
130. Boy in Landscape
131. Demopolis on White Bluff
132. Selma from the Alabama River
133. Big Spring Huntsville
134. Landscape (European Scene)
135. Young Girl Blowing Bubbles "To Mrs. G. Lyon / from Wm Frye"
136. Lady at the Bath "For George Glover, Esq./Demopolis"
137. Lady with Arm up Shielding Face

*whereabouts unknown
