= Lowry House (Huntsville, Alabama) =

Historic house in Alabama, United States

- U.S. National Register of Historic Places
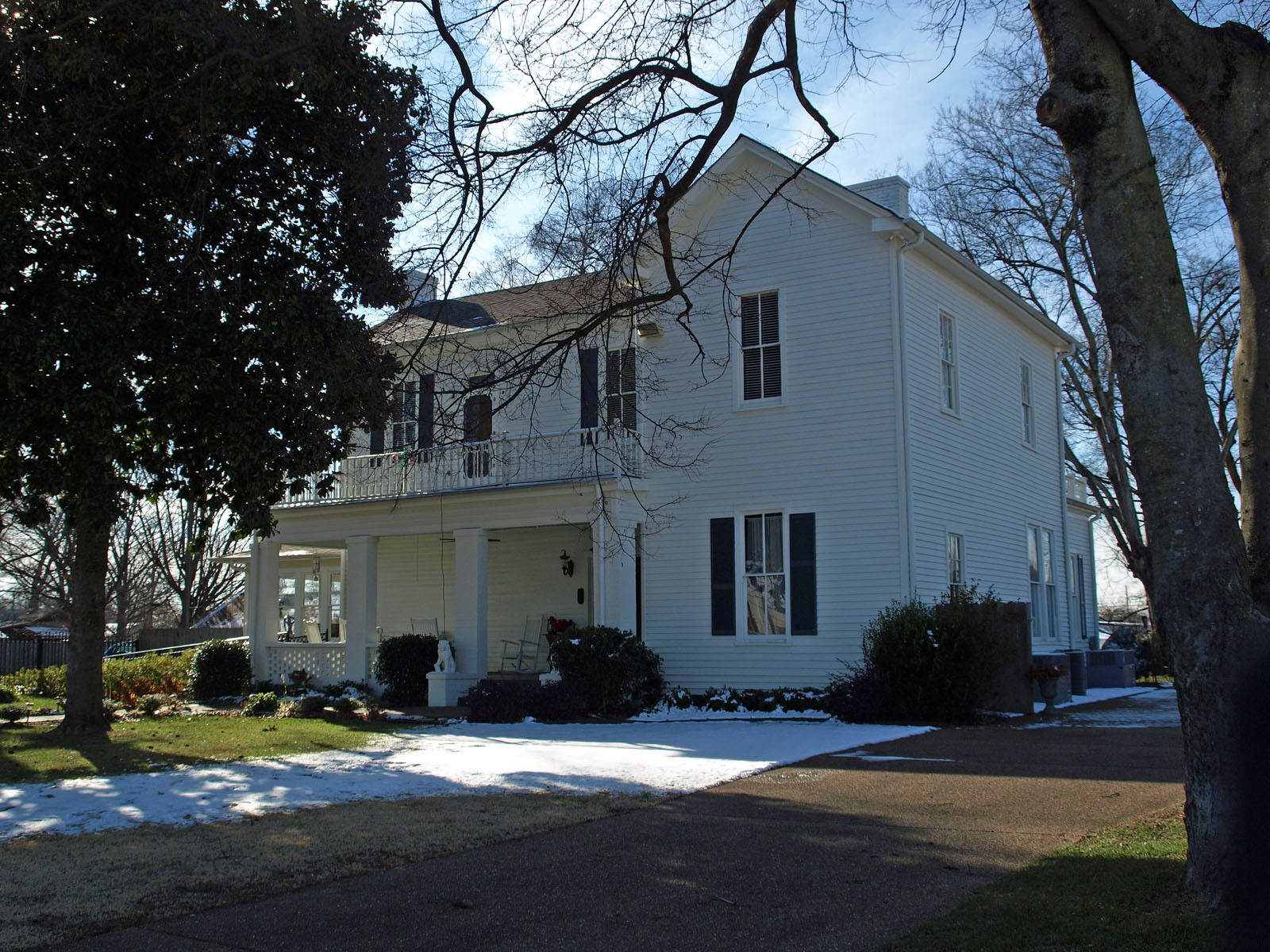
- The house in December 2010

- Location within Huntsville, Alabama Location within Alabama Location within the United States
- Location: 1205 Kildare Ave., Huntsville, Alabama
- Coordinates: 34°44′49″N 86°35′8″W
- Area: less than one acre
- Architectural style: Mid 19th Century Revival
- NRHP reference No.: 01001165
- Added to NRHP: October 29, 2001

The Lowry House is a historic home in Huntsville, Alabama. It was built circa 1850 by John Tate Lowry, a merchant with the firm of Lowry, Hamilton and Company. Elements of an earlier Lowry family log house, built circa 1809, that stood on the site were incorporated into the new construction.

Restoration of the Lowry House began in 1998 with assistance from Harvie P. Jones, a preservation architect. It took a total of four years. The house was listed on the National Register of Historic Places by the National Park Service on October 29, 2001. It was subsequently listed on the Alabama Register of Landmarks and Heritage on November 26, 2012.

== History ==
When the house was built circa 1850, John Tate Lowry was a slave owner. In the 1860s, during the American Civil War, Lowry became an abolitionist and the house became a stop on the Underground Railroad. Lowry had a secret room built upstairs, off of his bedroom, for escaped slaves to stay in. Lowry also had the staircase built so that the stairs would not creak when walked on, so that the slaves could sneak up to the secret room, even if Lowry had guests.

== Supporting education ==
Today, the Historic Lowry House is open and available to the public and can be rented for private functions. The manicured grounds have been awarded the city's Beautification Award for five consecutive years. This historic home is filled with artifacts and information related to Huntsville's history.

The house hosts field trips for grade school students in the surrounding communities. Field trips are offered through Earthscope, a local organization that provides hands-on, experimental, and activity-based educational experiences for elementary school children. These lessons teach students about the influence of "King Cotton" from planting to how the crop is used in everyday life.

== See also ==
- Weeden House Museum
