= Twickenham Historic District =

Historic district in Alabama, United States

- U.S. National Register of Historic Places
- U.S. Historic district
- Location within Huntsville, Alabama Location within Alabama Location within the United States
- Location: Huntsville, Alabama
- Coordinates: 34°43′47″N 86°34′43″W
- Architectural style: Greek Revival, Late Victorian, Federal
- NRHP reference No.: 73000357 (original); 14000045 (increase)

Significant dates
- Added to NRHP: January 4, 1973
- Boundary increase: May 26, 2015

Twickenham Historic District was the first historic district designated in Huntsville, Alabama, US. It was added to the National Register of Historic Places on January 4, 1973, with a boundary increase on May 26, 2015. The name derives from an early name for the town of Huntsville, named after Twickenham, England, by LeRoy Pope. It features homes in the Federal and Greek Revival architectural styles introduced to the city by Virginia-born architect George Gilliam Steele about 1818, and contains the most dense concentration of antebellum homes in Alabama.

The 1819 Weeden House Museum, home of female artist and poet Maria Howard Weeden, is open to the public, as are other sites in the district.

== Notable structures ==
- Helion Lodge 1 — 409 Lincoln Street, original building erected 1820; current building started in 1911. Home of a Masonic group that is the oldest in the state.
