= Frances C. Roberts =

American historian (1916–2000)

- Born: Frances Cabaniss Roberts; December 19, 1916; Gainesville, Alabama, US
- Died: November 5, 2000 (aged 83)

Academic background
- Education: BSc, 1937, Livingston State; M.A., PhD., University of Alabama
- Thesis: Background and Formative Period in the Great Bend and Madison County (1956)

Frances Cabaniss Roberts (December 19, 1916 – November 5, 2000) was an American historian. She was a founding member of the University of Alabama in Huntsville who was posthumously inducted into the Alabama Women's Hall of Fame.

== Early life and education ==
Roberts was born on December 19, 1916, to parents Richard H. and Mary (Watson) Roberts. She was the great-granddaughter of Col Septimus D. Cabaniss, whose papers she later used to write her dissertation.

Growing up, she attended public schools in Gainesville and Livingston before completing two years at Livingston State Teachers College. With her teaching degree, she taught in Sumter County for two years before earning her Bachelor of Science degree in 1937. Upon earning her BS.c., she lived in her late aunt's house in Huntsville and began teaching at West Clinton School.

She continued to teach in elementary schools in Huntsville before entering the University of Alabama. In 1956, Roberts became the first woman to earn a Ph.D. in history from the University of Alabama. Her thesis "Background and Formative Period in the Great Bend and Madison County" was published in 2018 in honour of the state's 200th anniversary celebration.

== Career ==
Roberts was elected treasurer of the American Association of University Women (AAUW) Athens chapter in 1941. She later became a co-founding member of the AAUW's Huntsville chapter and was elected their inaugural president. When the Extension Center joined the UAH in 1950, she became the first chairman of the history department and the university's first full-time faculty member. She joined the UAH faculty in 1953 as an instructor before being promoted to assistant professor in 1956. In her later position as an associate professor, Roberts directed the university's Academic Advisement Center. She was also an editor of the Huntsville Historical Review and president of the Alabama Historical Association. In October 1975, she sat on the Alabama Committee for the Humanities and Public Policy. By 1978, she received the University of Alabama in Huntsville Award of Merit for Distinguished Service In the Field of State and Local History. She finally became a full professor of history in 1961 until her retirement on August 31, 1980.

On May 14, 1988, the University of Alabama in Huntsville renamed their Humanities Building in her honor. As a member of the Huntsville-Madison County Historical Society, she worked alongside architect Harvie Jones to save the Weeden House. She also helped establish the Alabama Constitution Village and the Burritt Mountain Museum and Park before her death in 2000. Roberts was posthumously inducted into the Alabama Women's Hall of Fame in 2013.

== Publications ==
- An experiment in emancipation of slaves by an Alabama planter, 1940
- Understanding civics : to accompany Civics for Alabama schools, 1960
- Shadows on the wall: life and works of Howard Weeden, 1962
- Sesquicentennial history of Church of the Nativity, Episcopal, 1843-1993, Huntsville, Alabama, 1992
