= Weeden House Museum =

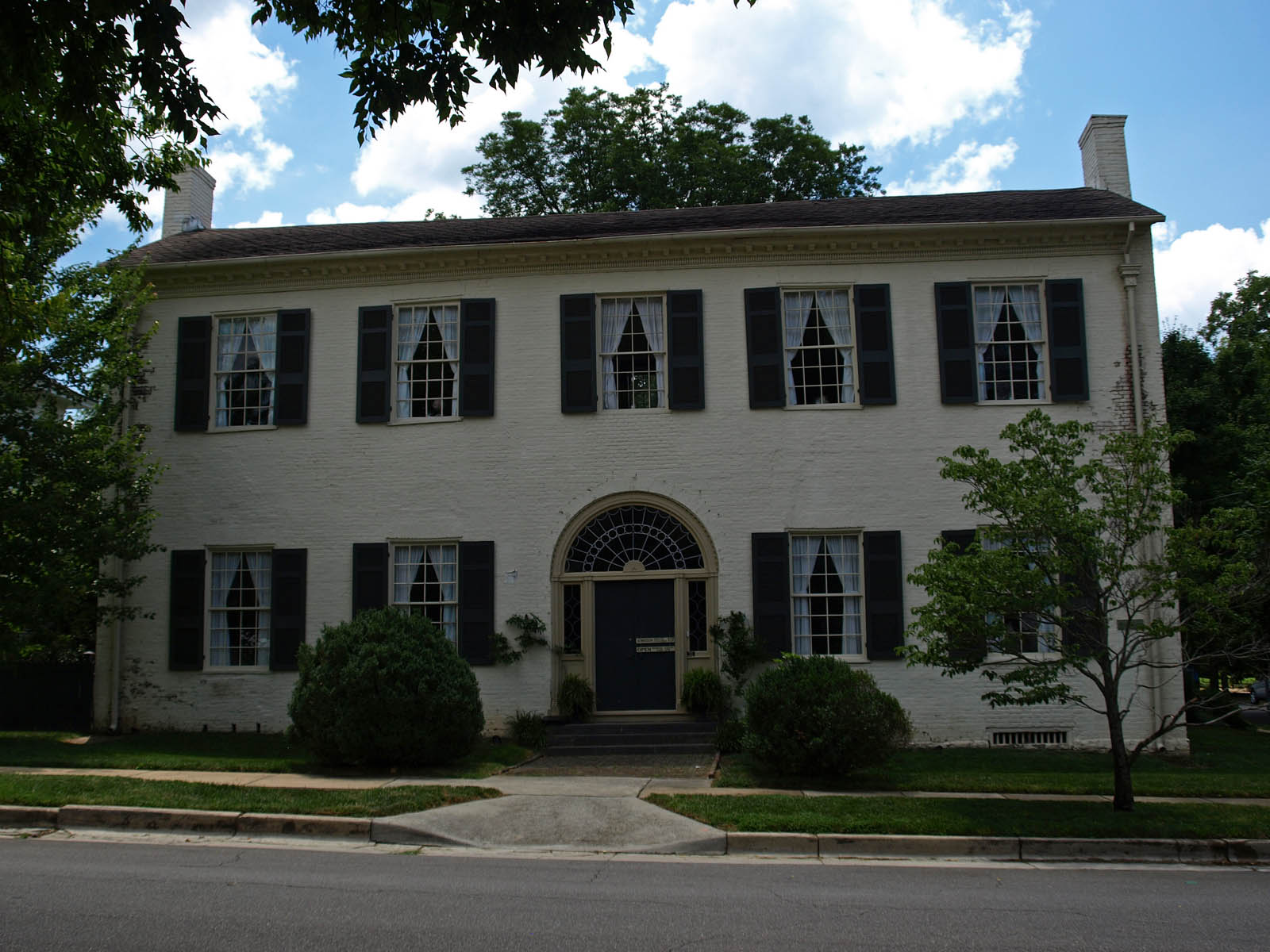
- The house in 2010
- Interactive map of the Weeden House Museum area

General information
- Type: House
- Location: 300 Gates Avenue South East, Huntsville, Alabama, United States
- Coordinates: 34°43′47″N 86°34′56″W
- Completed: 1819

Technical details
- Floor count: 2
- Weeden House Museum
- U.S. Historic district – Contributing property
- Part of: Twickenham Historic District (ID73000357)
- Designated CP: January 4, 1973

The Weeden House Museum is a historic two-story house in Huntsville, Alabama. It was built in 1819 for Henry C. Bradford, and designed in the Federal architectural style. Until 1845, it was sold and purchased by several home owners, including John McKinley, who served as a Congressman, Senator, and Associate Justice of the Supreme Court of the United States. From 1845 to 1956, it belonged to the Weeden family. During the American Civil War of 1861–1865, the Union Army took over the house while the Weedens moved to Tuskegee; they moved back in after the war. Portraitist and poet Maria Howard Weeden spent most of her life in the house. After it was sold by the Weeden family in 1956, the house was remodelled into residential apartments. In 1973, it was purchased by the city of Huntsville and the Twickenham Historic Preservation District Association restored it before they acquired it from the city. The private residence became a house museum in 1981.

== See also ==
- Lowry House (Huntsville, Alabama)
