= Maria Howard Weeden =

American artist and poet

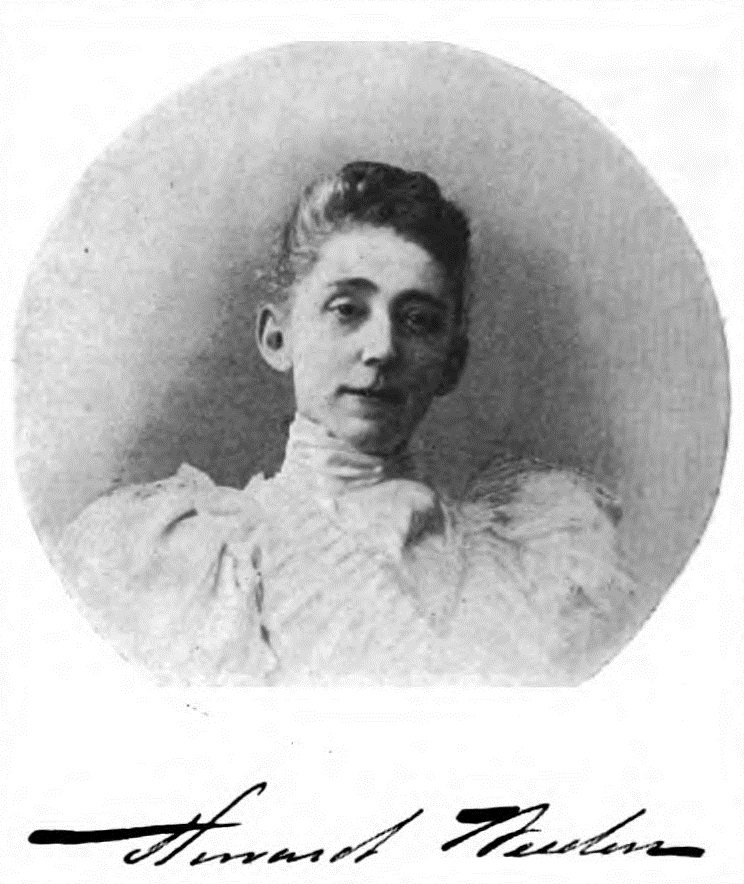
- Born: July 6, 1846; Huntsville, Alabama, U.S.
- Died: April 12, 1905 (aged 58); Huntsville, Alabama, U.S.
- Resting place: Maple Hill Cemetery
- Education: Tuskegee Women's College
- Occupations: Painter, poet
- Known for: Art and poetry

Maria Howard Weeden (July 6, 1846 – April 12, 1905), who signed her work and published as Howard Weeden, was an American artist and poet based in Huntsville, Alabama. After the American Civil War, she began to sell works she painted, which included portraits of many African-American freedmen and freedwomen. She exhibited her work in Berlin and Paris in 1895, where it was well received. She published four books of her poetry from 1898 to 1904, illustrated with her own art. She was posthumously inducted into the Alabama Women's Hall of Fame in 1998.

== Early life ==
Weeden was born July 6, 1846, in Huntsville, Alabama, six months after the death of her father, Dr. William Weeden, who had also been a prosperous planter. Her mother was his second wife, the former widow Jane (née Urquhart) Watkins. Weeden and her five older siblings were raised by their mother in the Weeden House in Huntsville.

During the Civil War, the Union Army took over their house for use by its officers when it occupied the city in 1862. The family first moved to the slave quarters. When Jane, one of the older Weeden daughters, was attending college in Tuskegee, Alabama, the mother moved the rest of the family there. Maria Weeden also attended the same school, Tuskegee Female College during the war years. (It later became known as Huntingdon College.) She had written poetry and painted since childhood, and at college studied with painter William Frye.

After returning to Huntsville, Weeden began to paint cards, booklets, dinner cards, and small gifts to sell to help her family. Some were watercolors of flowers and landscapes. She also taught art classes.

== Career ==
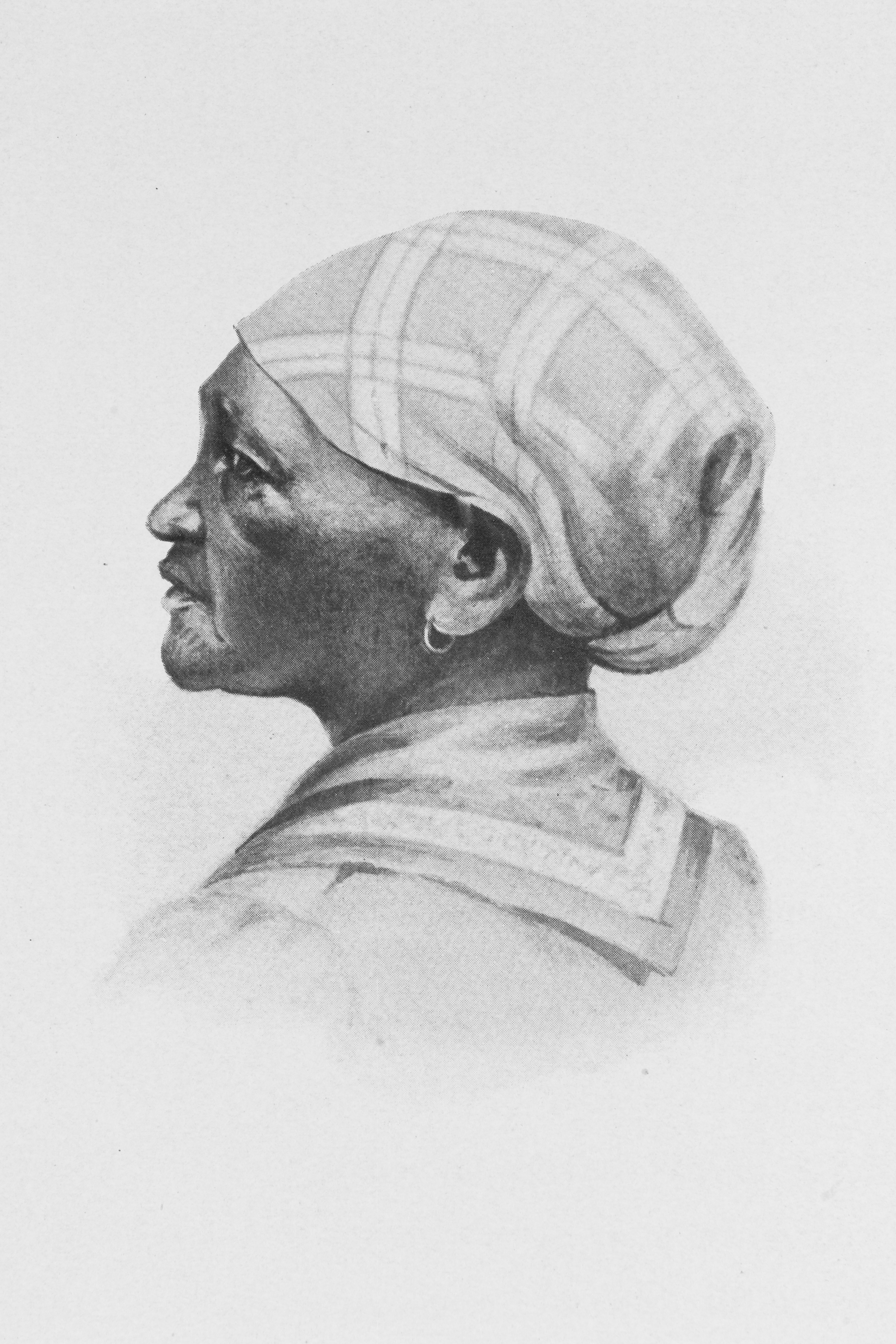
A portrait by Weeden accompanying a poem in Shadows on the Wall (1898)

In 1893 Weeden attended the World's Columbian Exposition in Chicago, where she was dismayed by other artists whose works featuring freedmen and freedwomen showed them in the caricature style of minstrel shows. She returned to Huntsville determined to express the full humanity and dignity of freedmen. Her images included pictures of many freed African Americans who worked as servants for her and friends' families. While she painted, she listened to their accounts of their lives and of folktales, and later adapted some of these as poems, which she wrote in the black dialect. She also painted a portrait of Saint Bartley Harris, a prominent African American pastor in Huntsville, Alabama.

In the 1890s, Joseph Edwin Washington and his wife Mary Bolling Kemp Washington, who owned the Wessyngton Plantation in Robertson County, Tennessee, commissioned Weeden to make portraits of several of their African-American servants, who had stayed to work for them as freedmen after emancipation. These works were about 5" x7" in size, and some were completed in pastels. Weeden's near-sightedness was said to have contributed to her making closely detailed portraits having a "miniature like finish." It is also thought that she may have worked from photographs of subjects.

In 1895, Weeden exhibited several portraits of African-American freedmen and freedwomen in Berlin and Paris, where they were well received. Her paintings were praised by writers Joel Chandler Harris and Thomas Nelson Page, and Harris wrote the foreword to her book Bandanna Ballads (1899).

Weeden also wrote poetry, and she combined both poetry and art in her four books published between 1898 and 1904. Some of her poems were written in the black dialect, now known as African-American English, as she was inspired by stories and folktales told to her by her subjects when they were sitting for portraits.

Between 1866 and 1896, Weeden also contributed numerous essays and short stories to the Presbyterian Christian Observer, under the pseudonym of "Flake White." These were collected and reprinted in 2005.

== Personal life and death ==
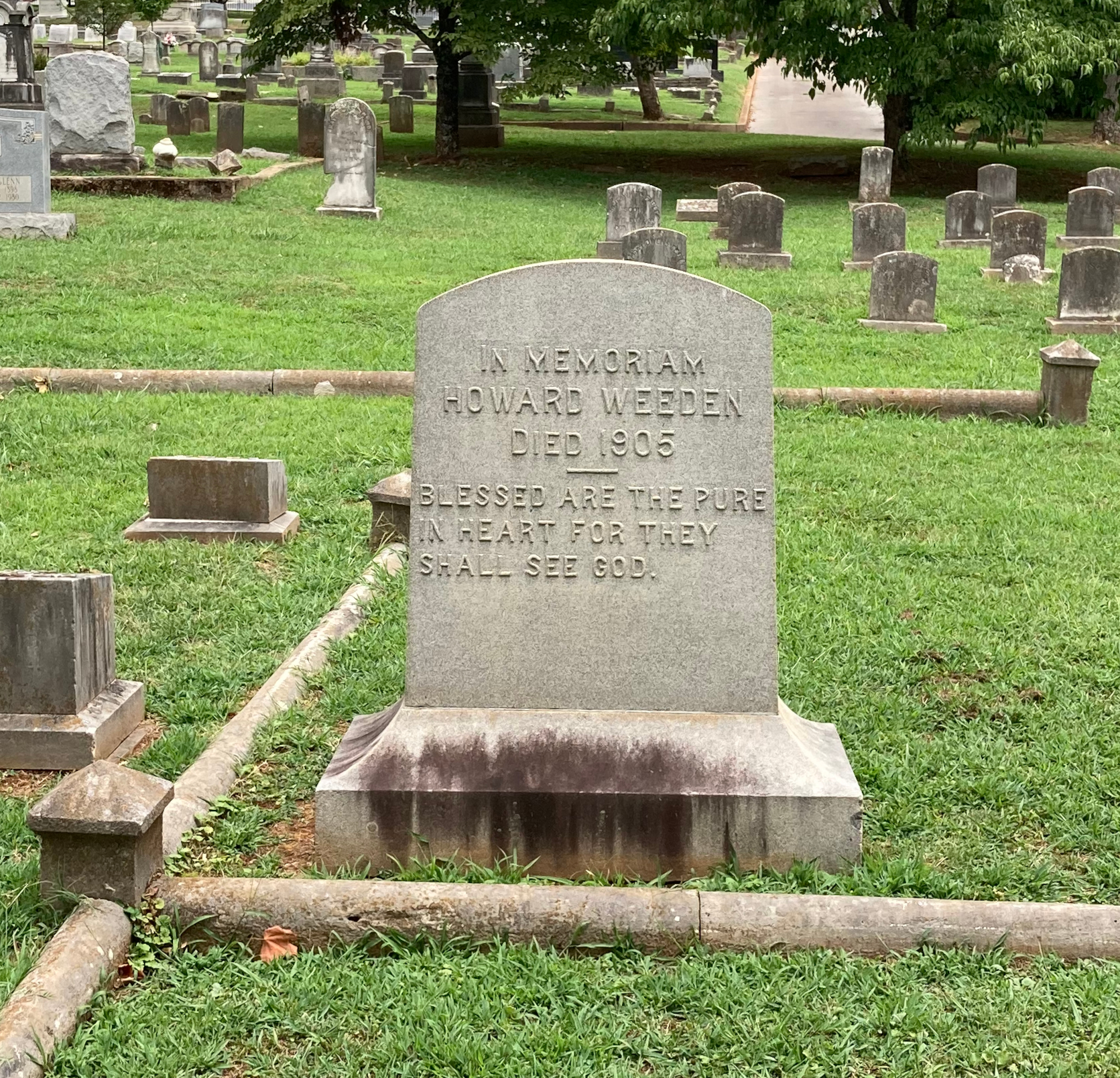
Weeden's grave at Maple Hill Cemetery

Weeden never married. She and her unmarried sister Kate both lived in the Weeden House as adults. Weeden died of tuberculosis at age 59 on April 12, 1905, in Huntsville, and was buried at Maple Hill Cemetery. In 1998 Weeden was posthumously inducted into the Alabama Women's Hall of Fame.

== Works ==
- Weeden, Howard (1898). Shadows on the Wall. M. Stolz & company.
- Weeden, Howard (1899). Bandanna Ballads.
- Weeden, Howard (1901). Songs of the Old South.
- Weeden, Howard (1904). Old Voices. New York, Doubleday, Page & company.
- Weeden, Howard (2005). Huff Fisk, Sarah; Wright Riley, Linda (eds.). Lost Writings of Howard Weeden as "Flake White". Huntsville: Big Spring Press. ISBN 9780976583608. OCLC 60669383.
