= Alabama State Route 157 =

State highway in Alabama, United States

State Route 157

Route information
- Maintained by ALDOT
- Length: 91.061 mi (146.548 km)

Major junctions
- South end: US 278 / CR 719 east of Cullman
- SR 69 in Cullman; US 31 in Cullman; I-65 in Cullman; SR 36 in Speake; SR 24 in Moulton; SR 33 in Moulton; SR 101 near Hatton; US 72 Alt. / SR 20 near Muscle Shoals; US 43 / US 72 in Florence
- North end: SR 227 at Tennessee state line near Cloverdale

Location
- Country: United States
- State: Alabama
- Counties: Cullman, Morgan, Lawrence, Colbert, Lauderdale

Highway system
- Alabama State Highway System; Interstate; US; State
| ← SR 156 | → SR 158 |

State Route 157 (SR 157) is a 91-mile-long (146 km) state highway in the northern and northwestern parts of the U.S. state of Alabama. Its southern terminus is at an intersection with U.S. Route 278 (US 278) approximately 10 miles (16 km) east of Cullman, where it continues as County Road 719. The northern terminus of the highway is at the Tennessee state line northwest of Florence, where it continues as Tennessee State Route 227 (SR 227).

== Route description ==
SR 157 begins at a 4-way stop with US 278. South of the 4-way stop, the road continues as Cullman County Road 719.

Following a four-lane (undivided and divided) northern bypass of Cullman, the route serves as a retail strip, intersecting U.S. 31 and Interstate 65. West of the Interstate, the route immediately ruralizes, meandering across Brindley Mountain. After descending into the Moulton Valley, the route straightens, following a mostly flat routing to outside Moulton.

After narrowing to an undivided highway, the route serves the retail district of Moulton, crossing the divided SR 24. Leaving the city limits, the route widens back into a divided highway. After weaving across the upper ridges of the Moulton Valley, the route descends into the Tennessee Valley, continuing onward to a limited intersection with U.S. 72 Alternate outside Muscle Shoals.

After a concurrency with U.S. 72 Alternate, the route turns north with SR 133, crossing the Tennessee River at the Singing River Bridge. Continuing north, SR 133 turns onto Veterans Drive while SR 157 continues as Helton Drive while skirting the edge of downtown Florence. After crossing U.S. 72/ U.S. 43, the route intersects SR 133 once again on the north side of the city. In its second concurrency with SR-133 (as Cox Creek Parkway), the route heads west before turning onto Cloverdale Road. The route leaves incorporated areas, continuing north as a two-lane highway to the Tennessee state line.

== History ==
Most of the length of SR 157 was constructed between 1957 and 1962.

In 1969, the route was rerouted in Cullman County onto a new road, from an older two-lane road. This older routing is now discontinuous and impossible to traverse at once without using the new route, compiled of modern-day County Road 1188, County Road 1181, County Road 1174; and (on the east side of Interstate 65) 'Old Highway 157' and St. Joseph Street NW. After that point, SR 157 was routed onto the modern-day routing, also a two-lane road. This new routing featured an interchange with Interstate 65 and continued straight to U.S. Route 31. Over the last several years, this routing has been widened and extended to be a continuous four-lane divided highway from U.S. Route 31 to the county line; and now extends all the way to U.S. Route 278 on the east side of the city.

The stretch between SR 36 at Oakville and SR 33 at Moulton was constructed later, between 1967 and 1968.

SR 157 has been four-laned along almost its entire length. This project, which began in the 1980s, was finally completed in the summer of 2007.

== Major intersections ==
| County | Location | mi | km | Destinations | Notes |
|---|---|---|---|---|---|
| Cullman | | 0.000 | 0.000 | US 278 (SR 74) / CR 719 – Cullman, Gadsden | Southern terminus; continuation as Cullman County Road 719 |
| Cullman | Cullman | 0.601 | 0.967 | SR 69 – Cullman, Guntersville, Ave Maria Grotto | |
| Cullman | Cullman | 5.081 | 8.177 | US 31 (2nd Avenue NW / SR 3) – Decatur, Ave Maria Grotto | |
| Cullman | Cullman | 6.204 | 9.984 | I-65 – Birmingham, Huntsville | I-65 exit 310 |
| Lawrence | Speake | 29.211 | 47.011 | SR 36 – Double Springs, Hartselle | |
| Lawrence | Moulton | 38.002 | 61.158 | SR 24 – Red Bay, Decatur | |
| Lawrence | Moulton | 39.754 | 63.978 | SR 33 (Market Street) – Courtland | |
| Lawrence | Hatton | 49.368 | 79.450 | SR 101 – Town Creek | |
| Colbert | Muscle Shoals | 61.288 | 98.633 | US 72 Alt. east / SR 20 east (Wheeler Highway) – Decatur, Joe Wheeler State Park | Southern end of US 72 Alt./SR 20 concurrency |
| Colbert | Muscle Shoals | 63.607 | 102.366 | US 72 Alt. west / SR 20 west / SR 133 begins / CR 57 south (3 Mile Lane) – Tuscumbia, Florence | Northern end of US 72 Alt./SR 20 concurrency; southern end of SR 133 concurrency; northern terminus of CR 57 |
| Colbert | Muscle Shoals | 67.839 | 109.176 | SR 184 (Second Street) | |
| Tennessee River | | | | Singing River Bridge | |
| Lauderdale | Florence | 71.175 | 114.545 | SR 133 north (Veterans Drive) | Interchange; northern end of SR 133 concurrency |
| Lauderdale | Florence | 72.260 | 116.291 | US 43 / US 72 (Florence Boulevard / SR 2 / SR 13 / SR 17 south) | Interchange; southern end of SR 17 concurrency |
| Lauderdale | Florence | 74.359– 75.448 | 119.669– 121.422 | SR 133 south (Cox Creek Parkway) / CR 199 north (Helton Drive) – Athens | Southern end of SR 133 concurrency; southern terminus of CR 199 |
| Lauderdale | Florence | 75.786 | 121.966 | SR 17 north (Chisholm Road) – Florence, Waynesboro | Northern end of SR 17 concurrency |
| Lauderdale | Florence | 76.578 | 123.240 | SR 133 north (Cox Creek Parkway) – Savannah | Northern end of SR 133 concurrency |
| Lauderdale | Cloverdale | 91.061 | 146.548 | SR 227 east (Pumping Station Road) | Tennessee state line |
1.000 mi = 1.609 km; 1.000 km = 0.621 mi: Concurrency terminus
