= Alabama State Route 20 =

State highway in Alabama, United States

State Route 20

Route information
- Maintained by ALDOT
- Length: 73.978 mi (119.056 km)

Major junctions
- West end: SR 69 northwest of Florence
- Natchez Trace Parkway northwest of Florence; US 43 / US 72 / SR 13 / SR 17 at Florence; US 72 Alt. / SR 157 at Muscle Shoals; SR 67 at Decatur; US 31 at Decatur
- East end: I-65 / I-565 / US 72 Alt. at Mooresville

Location
- Country: United States
- State: Alabama
- Counties: Lauderdale, Colbert, Lawrence, Morgan, Limestone

Highway system
- Alabama State Highway System; Interstate; US; State
← I-20	→ SR 21

State Route 20 (SR 20) is a 73.978-mile-long (119.056 km) state highway in the northern part of the U.S. state of Alabama. It travels from the Tennessee state line, where it continues as Tennessee State Route 69, northwest of Florence, east to Interstate 65 (I-65), east of Decatur. It crosses the Tennessee River at Florence (with US 43, US 72, SR 17, and SR 157) and also at Decatur (with US 31 and US 72 Alt.)

US 72 Alt. follows SR 20 from the intersection with US 72 at Muscle Shoals to I-65 east of Decatur, the entire stretch being four-laned.

== Route description ==
SR 20 begins in Waterloo at the Tennessee state line. It junctions with the Natchez Trace Parkway and enters Florence. In Florence, the route junctions with SR 133. It continues south to parallel the Tennessee River, heading east for just a mile as Coffee Road before junctioning with US 72 and US 43 at a Parclo. It crosses the Tennessee River with the two routes, SR 17, and SR 13.

Heading south in concurrency with U.S. 43/72 and SR 13/17, the route serves Muscle Shoals and Tuscumbia. Turning east onto the U.S. 72/ U.S. 72 Alternate right-of-way, the route leaves incorporated areas. In concurrency with U.S. 72 Alternate, the route turns directly east at a limited interchange with SR-157.

The two routes take a four-lane divided routing across the Tennessee Valley to Decatur, roughly paralleling a Norfolk Southern rail line.

The route reaches U.S. 31 in downtown Decatur, turning north in concurrency across the Tennessee River on the Steamboat Bill Memorial Bridge. North of the river, the route turns east at full interchange with U.S. 31, continuing straight ahead to its interchange with Interstate 65, where the route ends (U.S. 72 Alternate continues in concurrency with Interstate 565 past this interchange).

== History ==
SR 20 was started when Alabama renumbered SR 41 with a statewide renumbering in 1929. The original route passed from US 72 at Muscle Shoals to US 31 at Decatur. This portion was named the Joe Wheeler Highway, and markers commemorating this are still located on East (Decatur at Railroad/Church Streets) and West (Tuscumbia-Old Lee Highway) ends. In 1931, SR 20 replaced SR 2 following US 72 west to the Mississippi state line west of Margerum, and in 1936 it was extended east to Huntsville.

1957 saw many changes to SR 20. It was replaced again by SR 2 along US 72 to the Mississippi state line, and, in turn, SR 20 replaced SR 2 traveling north to Florence and northwest of Florence to the Tennessee state line, forming a route popularly known as New Savannah Highway. SR 20 was also realigned to a much more direct route between Decatur and Huntsville, bypassing the town of Madison.

Beginning in the early 1980s, the eastern terminus of SR 20 began retreating to the west. The original terminus was at Clinton Avenue and US 231/US 431 in downtown Huntsville. With the construction of I-565 in the early 1990s along the route of SR 20 east of I-65, SR 20 was slowly pulled back to its current terminus at the junction of I-65 and becomes I-565. Original sections of SR 20 can be found in the town of Mooresville, with an unusually wide two way road that is clearly visible from aerial views. The old section becomes a divided highway before eventually merging into an access road that parallels I-565 up to Greenbrier.

== Major intersections ==
County	Location	mi	km	Destinations	Notes
Lauderdale		0.000	0.000	SR 69 north – Savannah	Tennessee state line
Lauderdale		7.645	12.303	Natchez Trace Parkway	Interchange
Lauderdale		17.162	27.620	SR 133 south (Cox Creek Parkway) to US 43 north / US 72 east – Athens, Joe Wheeler State Park	
Lauderdale	Florence	22.048	35.483	US 43 north / US 72 east / SR 13 north / SR 17 north (SR 2 east) – Port of Florence	Western end of US 43/US 72/SR 2/SR 13/SR 17 concurrency; interchange
Tennessee River		22.795	36.685	O'Neal Bridge	
Colbert	Sheffield–Muscle Shoals line	24.475	39.389	SR 184 east (Second Street) – Muscle Shoals, Sheffield	
Colbert	Tuscumbia–Muscle Shoals line	27.803	44.745	US 43 south / SR 13 south / SR 17 south / US 72 west (SR 2) / US 72 Alt. east – Corinth	Eastern end of US 43/US 72 concurrency; western end of US 72 Alt. concurrency
Colbert		29.870	48.071	SR 133 north / SR 157 north (Wilson Dam Road) / CR 57 south – Airport	Western end of SR 157 concurrency
Colbert		32.189	51.803	SR 157 south – Moulton, Cullman	Eastern end of SR 157 concurrency; no left turn westbound
Lawrence	Town Creek	43.103	69.368	SR 101 – Lexington, Hatton, Wheeler Dam, Joe Wheeler State Park	
Lawrence	Courtland	50.609	81.447	SR 33 south – Moulton, Courtland Historic District	
Morgan		65.780	105.863	SR 67 south (Beltline Road)	
Morgan	Decatur	69.147	111.281	US 31 south (6th Avenue / SR 3) – Hartselle	Western end of US 31/SR 3 concurrency
Morgan; Limestone	Decatur	68.484	110.214	Steamboat Bill Memorial Bridges over Tennessee River	
Limestone	Decatur	72.130	116.082	US 31 north (SR 3) – Athens, Calhoun Community College	Eastern end of US 31/SR 3 concurrency; interchange
Limestone	Decatur	73.135	117.699	CR 3 north (Bibb Garrett Lane) / CR 113 south (Mitchell Road)	Future business district in northern Decatur, possibly future I565 exit
Limestone	Decatur–Huntsville line	73.978	119.056	I-65 – Nashville, Birmingham I-565 east / US 72 Alt. east – Huntsville	Eastern terminus and signed as exits 1A (south) and 1B (north); I-65 north exit 340, south exit 340A-B
1.000 mi = 1.609 km; 1.000 km = 0.621 mi: Concurrency terminus

== Historic routes ==
Several sections of Old Highway 20 still exist:

- Lauderdale County Road 200 through Sullivans Crossroads, Central Heights, Lovelace and McGee Town, known as Old Savannah Highway.
- Lauderdale County Road 14 from McGee Town to Florence
- Colbert County Road 22 through Leighton.
- Jefferson Street through Courtland
- Old Trinity Road between Trinity and Decatur
- Old Highway 20 through Mooresville – The section east of Mooresville is part of the 1957 alignment.
- 1936 Alignment
  - Mooresville Road north of Mooresville through Belle Mina to Old Highway 20.
  - Old Highway 20 east through Greenbrier to County Line Road.
  - County Line Road north to Palmer Road.
  - Palmer Road east to Downtown Madison.
  - Old Madison Pike from Madison to I-565 exit 15.
- 1957 Alignment
  - Madison Boulevard from I-565 exit 5 to I-565 exit 13.
- Governors Drive in Huntsville from I-565 exit 17 to Clinton Avenue.
- Clinton Avenue in Huntsville to US 231/US 431, Memorial Parkway.

== Corridor V ==
Corridor V is part of the Appalachian Development Highway System and follows the path of SR 20 between Decatur and the eastern Terminus at I-65.
