= Alabama State Route 133 =

State highway in Alabama, United States

State Route 133

Route information
- Maintained by ALDOT
- Length: 16.976 mi (27.320 km)

Major junctions
- South end: US 72 Alt. / SR 20 / SR 157 near Muscle Shoals
- SR 157 through Muscle Shoals; SR 184 in Muscle Shoals; US 43 / US 72 / SR 13 in Florence; SR 17 / SR 157 in Florence
- North end: SR 20 west of Florence

Location
- Country: United States
- State: Alabama
- Counties: Colbert, Lauderdale

Highway system
- Alabama State Highway System; Interstate; US; State
← SR 132	→ SR 134

State Route 133 (SR 133) is a 16.976-mile-long (27.320 km) mostly multi-lane state highway and is a primary artery through the Florence–Muscle Shoals metropolitan area in the northwestern part of the U.S. state of Alabama.

== Route description ==
SR 133 begins at an intersection with US 72 Alternate/SR 20/SR 157 just south of Muscle Shoals, in Colbert County. Here, the roadway continues as Colbert County Route 57 (CR 57). SR 133 and SR 157 travel concurrently to the north along Wilson Dam Road. It crosses over Dry Creek and then enters the city limits of Muscle Shoals. It travels underneath a railroad bridge that carries railroad tracks of Norfolk Southern Railway. After that, it briefly leaves the city limits. After it re-enters the city, it intersects Colbert CR 24 (CR 24; 6th Street). The road becomes a six-lane highway at Avalon Avenue. There is an intersection with SR 184 (East 2nd Street) just before a crossing of Pond Creek. It curves to the northwest and then cross the Tennessee River on the Singing River Bridge.

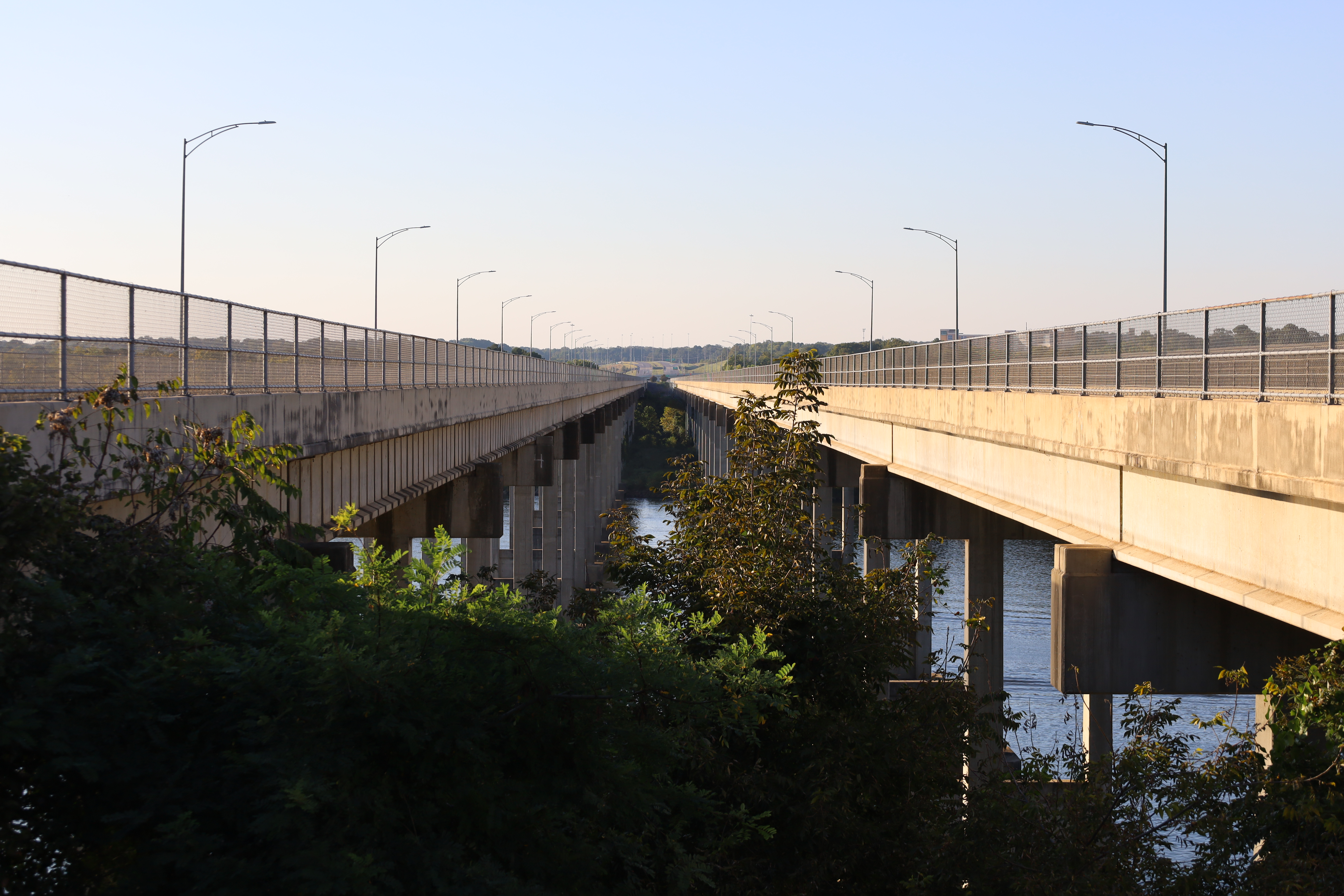
Route 133 crosses the Tennessee River on the. Singing River Bridge in Florence, Alabama, pictured in 2025

The road enters Lauderdale County and the city limits of Florence. Almost immediately, SR 133 splits off from SR 157 at an interchange. It travels to the northeast on Veterans Drive. It passes the Shoals Chamber of Commerce and the River Heritage Park. Just after passing Veterans Park, the highway curves to a nearly due north direction. At an intersection with the western terminus of Lauderdale CR 32 (Huntsville Road), SR 133 curves to the north-northwest. It has an intersection with US 43/US 72 (internally designated as SR 2)/SR 13 (Florence Boulevard). The highway curves to the northwest. It begins to travel along the northern edge of Delbert Park; on the northern edge of the park is an intersection with the western terminus of Lauderdale CR 46 (Gresham Road). On the northwestern edge of the park, after SR 133 has curved to a due west direction, it has an intersection with both the southern terminus of Lauderdale CR 47 (Old Jackson Highway South) and the northern terminus of Darby Drive.

Just after curving to the west-southwest, it begins a concurrency with SR 17/SR 157 (Helton Drive). Almost immediately, the three highways cross over some railroad tracks of CSX. A short distance later, SR 17 splits off to the north onto Chisolm Road, while SR 133 and SR 157 travel to the southwest. The road travels along the northern edge of Cox Creek Park and then curve to the west-northwest. It crosses over Cox Creek and immediately split, with SR 157 heading to the north-northwest onto Cloverdale Road, and SR 133 continuing to the west-northwest. SR 133 leaves the city limits of Florence and curves to the southwest. It intersects Lauderdale CR 41 (Jackson Road) and then crosses over Cypress Creek. It curves to the west before curving back to the southwest. It then reaches its northern terminus, an intersection with SR 20 (Savannah Highway/General John Coffee Highway).

== History ==
SR 133 was likely formed around 1927 with the completion of Wilson Dam on the Tennessee River and the opening of it to automobile traffic. At this time, the highway would have started at an old alignment of SR 20 just a few hundred yards north of its current alignment. It followed Wilson Dam Road north through Muscle Shoals to the TVA Reservation. Here, it intersected Reservation Road, which traveled east to the dam. Crossing the dam, it would have entered Florence and followed Wilson Dam Road, just east of the current Cox Creek Parkway alignment. It ended at Huntsville Road, which at the time carried US 72.

In the mid-1950s, US 72 in Florence shifted to a new alignment on Florence Boulevard, about 0.5 miles (0.80 km) north of Huntsville Road. It is unclear, but SR 133 may have taken Middle Road to between Huntsville Road and Florence Blvd. to reach US 72. Also around this time, SR 20 south of Muscle Shoals shifted southward to a new routing, extending the route south about 300 yards (270 m).

Big changes occurred in the early 1970s with the construction of Cox Creek Parkway, a northern loop for the city of Florence. The new road placed SR 133 on a four-lane highway for the first time. From Wilson Dam, Cox Creek Parkway replaced Wilson Dam Road to carry SR 133 to Florence Boulevard. From there, the highway was extended some 7 miles (11 km) along the entirety of Cox Creek Parkway.

In 2002, the Singing River Bridge (Patton Island Bridge) opened, forming a new Tennessee River crossing 1 mile (1.6 km) west of Wilson Dam. As part of a long-term "Patton Island Corridor", SR 133 was shifted to this new six-lane bridge. The move necessitated construction of an overpass on Wilson Dam Road on the TVA Reservation. SR 133's routing on Reservation Road and Wilson Dam itself was removed. After crossing the new bridge into Florence, the route turned east on Veterans Drive to rejoin Cox Creek Parkway just north of Wilson Dam.

== Future ==
As part of the ongoing Patton Island Corridor development, changes will be made to SR 133.

In Lauderdale County, the final extension of the project, from Huntsville Road to Helton Drive, opened on October 16, 2008. This included the opening of an overpass and interchange at the intersection with Florence Boulevard. (US 43/US 72/SR 13). The highway is six lanes from the Patton Island Bridge north to the connection with Helton Drive and its intersection with Hermitage Drive. The routing of SR 133 on this new portion is unclear, however; signage still points SR 133 to Veterans Drive. It is possible that SR 133 will eventually be routed on this new roadway to Helton Drive, then follow Helton Drive to Cox Creek Parkway.

== Major intersections ==
County	Location	mi	km	Destinations	Notes
Colbert		0.000	0.000	US 72 Alt. / SR 20 / SR 157 south / CR 57 south – Moulton, Decatur, Tuscumbia	Southern terminus of SR 133; northern terminus of CR 57; southern end of SR 157 concurrency
Colbert	Muscle Shoals	4.232	6.811	SR 184 (East 2nd Street)	
Tennessee River		6.713	10.804	Singing River Bridge	
Lauderdale	Florence	7.568	12.180	SR 157 north (Helton Drive)	Interchange; northern end of SR 157 concurrency
Lauderdale	Florence	10.320	16.608	US 43 / US 72 / SR 13 (Florence Boulevard / SR 2) – Florence, Sheffield, Athens, Lawrenceburg, Joe Wheeler State Park	
Lauderdale	Florence	13.126	21.124	SR 17 south / SR 157 south / CR 199 north (Helton Drive)	Southern end of SR 17 and SR 157 concurrencies; southern terminus of CR 199
Lauderdale	Florence	13.464	21.668	SR 17 north (Chisholm Road) – Florence, Waynesboro	Northern end of SR 17 concurrency
Lauderdale	Florence	14.256	22.943	SR 157 north (Cloverdale Road) – Cloverdale	Northern end of SR 157 concurrency
Lauderdale		16.976	27.320	SR 20 (Savannah Highway/General John Coffee Highway) – Florence, Savannah	
1.000 mi = 1.609 km; 1.000 km = 0.621 mi: Concurrency terminus
