= Alabama State Route 101 =

State highway in Alabama, United States

State Route 101

Route information
- Maintained by ALDOT
- Length: 39.107 mi (62.937 km)
- Existed: 1940–present

Major junctions
- South end: CR 460 in Mount Hope
- SR 24 in Mount Hope; US 72 Alt. in Town Creek; US 72 in Elgin
- North end: SR 227 at the Tennessee state line near Lexington

Location
- Country: United States
- State: Alabama
- Counties: Lawrence, Lauderdale

Highway system
- Alabama State Highway System; Interstate; US; State
← SR 100	→ SR 102

State Route 101 (SR 101) is a 39.107-mile-long (62.937 km) north–south state highway in the northwestern part of the U.S. state of Alabama. The southern terminus of the highway is at an intersection with County Route 460 (CR 460), the former route of SR 24 west of Moulton. The highway continues northward to the Tennessee state line, where it continues as Tennessee State Route 227 (SR 227).

== Route description ==
=== Lawrence County ===
SR 101 begins at an intersection with CR 460 west of Moulton, in Lawrence County. This intersection is just west-southwest of Town Creek Cemetery. It travels to the north and intersects SR 24. It curves to the north-northwest and intersects the western terminus of CR 114. The highway intersects the northern terminus of CR 50 and curves to the north-northeast. It has a one-block concurrency with CR 128. SR 101 meets the northern terminus of CR 127. Then, it intersects the eastern terminus of CR 343. The highway curves to the northeast and intersects the western terminus of CR 157. It curves to a nearly due north direction and intersects the eastern terminus of CR 131. SR 101 enters Hatton. There, it passes Hatton High School and has a one-block concurrency with CR 236. Upon leaving Hatton, SR 101 intersects the western terminus of CR 156 and the southern terminus of CR 147, which are one block apart. The highway curves to the northwest and crosses over Watches Creek. After it curves to the north-northwest, it intersects the eastern terminus of CR 146. It then curves to the north-northeast and intersects SR 157 (University of North Alabama Highway). Then, it intersects CR 136. One block later is the eastern terminus of CR 255. The highway crosses over Beck Creek and intersects the western terminus of CR 589 just before curving back to the north-northwest. After curving to the northeast, it intersects the western terminus of CR 258 and then the eastern terminus of CR 259. At the beginning of a curve to the northwest is an intersection with the southern terminus of CR 262. The highway curves to the north-northeast and enters Town Creek. It crosses over Tucker Branch and intersects the eastern terminus of CR 143. Just before heading north, SR 101 intersects the northern terminus of CR 261 (Brooks Spring Road). It intersects the eastern terminus of CR 141 and the eastern terminus of CR 267. In the main part of Town Creek, is an intersection with US 72 Alt./SR 20 and a crossing of Warren Branch. Just before leaving the city limits of Town Creek, the highway intersects the southern terminus of CR 216. It crosses over Meadow Branch. It then intersects the western terminus of CR 269 and the eastern terminus of CR 268 before meeting CR 406. After an intersection with the eastern terminus of CR 404, SR 101 passes Mathews Cemetery. It then intersects the eastern terminus of SR 184 and the northern terminus of CR 270 before reaching CR 314 (Foster Mill Road). SR 101 curves to the northeast and crosses over Big Nance Creek. Immediately after that crossing, it travels through the southern and southeastern parts of Joe Wheeler State Park. Just before leaving the park, it intersects CR 150 and CR 414 in close succession. The highway curves to the north-northwest and travels through Wheeler Dam Village. It then crosses over the Tennessee River on top of Wheeler Dam. This crossing marks the Lauderdale County line.

=== Lauderdale County ===
Just after crossing the river, SR 101 very briefly travels through a northern segment of Joe Wheeler State Park. After leaving the park, it curves to the northwest and has an intersection with the eastern terminus of CR 584 and the western terminus of CR 582. Just before curving back to the north is an intersection with the northern terminus of CR 581 and the western terminus of CR 580. It then intersects the southern terminus of CR 84, which leads to Butler Cemetery. The highway then intersects the eastern terminus of CR 596. It then enters Elgin. It intersects the southern terminus of CR 577. In the main part of the community is an intersection with US 72 (Lee Highway). North of Elgin is a crossing of Nunnally Branch just before an intersection with the eastern terminus of CR 576. The highway has an intersection with CR 92. Just before curving to the north-northeast, SR 101 intersects CR 76. It crosses over Springfield Branch. It curves back to the north and intersects the eastern terminus of CR 108. It curves back to the north-northeast and intersects CR 50. The two highways have a brief unsigned concurrency. After they split, SR 101 intersects the western terminus of CR 82. It crosses over Dry Branch and then briefly curves back to the north. Just before resuming its north-northeasterly direction, it intersects CR 104. The two highways have a very short unsigned concurrency. After splitting, SR 101 enters Lexington and intersects the western terminus of CR 613. It curves back to the north and intersects the western terminus of CR 497. In the main part of Lexington, the highway intersects the northern terminus of CR 51 and the northern terminus of CR 71 in quick succession. The final major intersection in Lexington is with SR 64. After leaving the city limits of Lexington, SR 101 intersects the southern terminus of CR 489. A short distance later is an intersection with the eastern terminus of CR 162. The highway then intersects the western terminus of CR 486. It then intersects the northern terminus of CR 488 and then the eastern terminus of CR 484. After crossing over Crossroads Branch, it intersects CR 482 on the Tennessee state line. Here, SR 101 ends, and the roadway continues as Tennessee State Route 227.

== History ==
Until 1997, the southern terminus of SR 101 was at an intersection with SR 24. When SR 24 was realigned along a route slightly north of its original placement as part of the construction of Corridor V, SR 101's southern terminus was not truncated.

== Major intersections ==
County	Location	mi	km	Destinations	Notes
Lawrence		0.000	0.000	CR 460	Southern terminus; former SR 24
Lawrence	Mount Hope	1.010	1.625	SR 24 – Russellville, Moulton	
Lawrence	Hatton	8.953	14.408	SR 157 (University of North Alabama Highway) – Muscle Shoals, Moulton	
Lawrence	Town Creek	15.890	25.572	US 72 Alt. / SR 20 – Tuscumbia, Decatur	
Lawrence		20.891	33.621	SR 184 west – Muscle Shoals	Eastern terminus of SR 184
Tennessee River		24.985	40.209	Wheeler Dam Bridge	
Lauderdale	Elgin	28.240	45.448	US 72 (Lee Highway / SR 2) – Florence, Athens, Joe Wheeler State Park	
Lauderdale	Lexington	36.968	59.494	SR 64 – Florence, Pulaski	
Lauderdale		39.107	62.937	SR 227 west (Lexington Highway) – Loretto	Tennessee state line; northern terminus
1.000 mi = 1.609 km; 1.000 km = 0.621 mi
