= Tennessee Valley =

Drainage basin of the Tennessee River

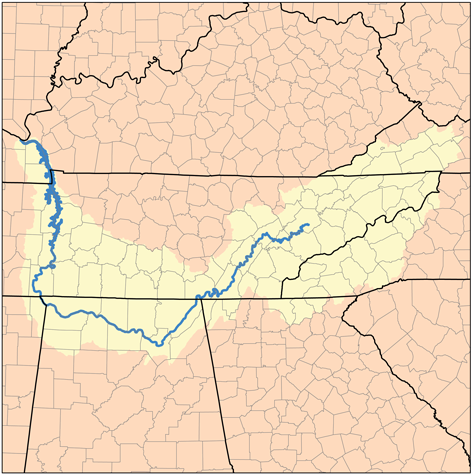
Map of the Tennessee Watershed

The Tennessee Valley is the drainage basin of the Tennessee River and is largely within the U.S. state of Tennessee. It stretches from southwest Kentucky to north Alabama and from northeast Mississippi to the mountains of Virginia and North Carolina. The border of the valley is known as the Tennessee Valley Divide. The Tennessee Valley contributes greatly to the formation of Tennessee's three legally recognized sectors (the Grand Divisions).

== Geography ==
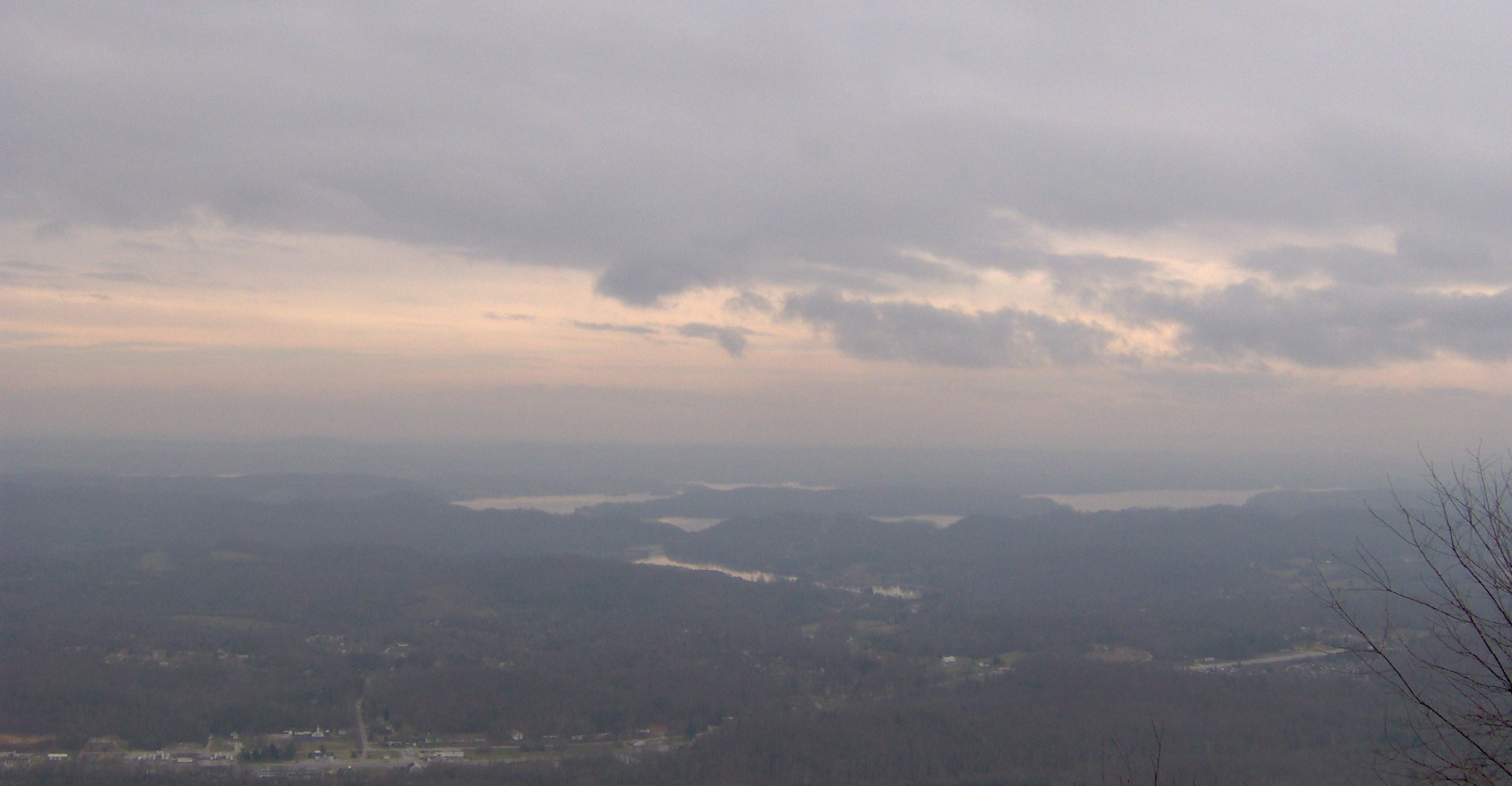
The Upper Tennessee Valley, looking east from the edge of the Cumberland Plateau near Rockwood, Tennessee

The Tennessee Valley begins in the upper head water portions of the Holston River, the Watauga River, and the Doe River in Northeast Tennessee and Southwest Virginia, as well as east of Asheville, North Carolina, with the headwaters of the French Broad and Pigeon rivers, all of which join at the confluence of the French Broad and the Holston to form the Tennessee River in Knoxville. From there, the river travels southwest, absorbing additional tributaries of the Little River, the Little Tennessee, and the Clinch, and further down, the Hiwassee and the Ocoee (both of which have sources in Georgia), before reaching Chattanooga.

The river then enters the Tennessee River Gorge as it winds its way through the Cumberland Plateau, reaching the lower portion of the Sequatchie Valley. After traversing North Alabama, the river veers northwestward. From the beginning of the Tennessee Valley to this point is roughly 150 miles (240 km); as it runs through East Tennessee the Valley is bound on the east by the Appalachian Mountains (including the Great Smoky Mountains) and on the northwest by the Cumberland Plateau and Cumberland Mountains.

After forming the boundary between Alabama and Mississippi for a stretch of 10 miles (16 km), the river reenters Tennessee, where it creates the dividing line between Middle Tennessee and West Tennessee. It empties into the Ohio River in western Kentucky, where it divides the region known as the Jackson Purchase from the rest of Kentucky.

Geologically, the eastern portion of the Tennessee Valley consists of many small valleys and ridges within a great valley. The larger region is termed the Ridge and Valley Province and the great valley is termed the Great Appalachian Valley.

== Important cities ==
- Chattanooga, Tennessee, about 120 miles (190 km) from both Huntsville and Knoxville, in opposite directions, is nicknamed "The Scenic City" for its beautiful views of the Tennessee Valley from atop the many mountaintops that surround the city. Chattanooga and its suburbs form the second most populous metropolitan area in the valley. The Battle of Chattanooga was fought on nearby Lookout Mountain. Chattanooga is also well known for the Chattanooga Choo-Choo, its transformation from a declining early industrial city to a thriving modern city, the famous Delta Queen, and the first publicly available one gigabit per second Internet access from a municipally owned utility company, i.e. the Electric Power Board (EPB), in the United States. Chattanooga is the 3rd largest city in the Tennessee Valley, with just over 180,000 people, and its Metropolitan Area Is home to about 560,000 people.
- Decatur, Alabama, known as "The River City", dominated the economic landscape of north Alabama until the late 1950s, when the space race catapulted its neighbor Huntsville into that position. For most of the 20th century up to that point, Decatur held the top position in terms of economic impact and population. Its mixture of river transport and rail access has made it a busy hub of business, commerce, and manufacturing (chemicals and textiles especially) flowing down the river on the barges and boats of numerous companies and docking at the Port of Decatur. Decatur also claims the nickname "The Heart of the Valley" because of its location near the exact center of the length of the Tennessee River. Also because most north–south shipping traffic is funneled through the town utilizing three river crossings that are main routes for rail and road traffic between Birmingham and Nashville. The city is also an important river port that uses intermodal facilities to switch shipping methods between trains, trucks, and barges. It is the 10th largest city in Alabama home to 58,000 people, slightly less than nearby Madison City. Its metro area is home to 160,000 and combines with Huntsville to form the Huntsville-Decatur CSA.
- Elizabethton, Tennessee, is a small city formerly known by the moniker "The City of Power" prior to the post World War II era of nuclear power production. It is located at the confluence of the Doe River and Watauga River downstream from the Watauga Reservoir and the Wilbur Reservoir. Both are maintained by the Tennessee Valley Authority (TVA). It is home to about 15,000 people and is located near Knoxville
- Florence, Alabama, considered part of the Shoals with Muscle Shoals, Sheffield, and Tuscumbia, is located immediately across the Tennessee River from Muscle Shoals. (The river divides Lauderdale County from Colbert County). Florence is the birthplace of W.C. Handy and is where the only Frank Lloyd Wright designed house in Alabama is located, the Rosenbaum House. Home to 40,000 people, it is the 11th largest city in Alabama. Its metro area is home to just over 150,000 people.
- Guntersville, Alabama, is a major city of northeast Alabama and has a major lake and river port, Lake Guntersville and the Port of Guntersville, respectively. The city is famous for being the place where Ricky Nelson played his last concert before dying in a plane crash on New Year's Eve 1986 (December 31, 1985). It is home to just under 9,000 people, however its sister city of Albertville to the south is home to 23,000 people.
- Huntsville, Alabama, nicknamed "the Rocket City", has risen to be the center of north Alabama economic activity since the dawn of the space age in the 1950s. It is now the largest city in Alabama. Its aerospace and military technology centers of Redstone Arsenal, Cummings Research Park, and NASA's Marshall Space Flight Center define the high-tech landscape for Alabama. Huntsville had in 2022 a population of over 220,000 people and is the largest city within the Tennessee Valley, and the 95th most populous city nationally. Despite being the largest city proper, its Metropolitan Area is the 3rd largest in The Tennessee Valley by population with 510,000 people. Huntsville was also ranked as the best major city to live in the entire country in 2022.
- Knoxville, Tennessee, the most populous metropolitan area in the valley, and the 2nd largest city proper after Huntsville. It is located where the Tennessee River begins at the confluence of the Holston and the French Broad Rivers. Knoxville along with nearby Oak Ridge and Maryville-Alcoa, form a major research and manufacturing corridor anchored by the University of Tennessee, the Oak Ridge National Laboratory, and the Tennessee Valley Authority headquarters (since 1980). It is home to 190,000 people and has a Metropolitan Area of 900,000 people.
- Madison, Alabama, The largest suburb of nearby Huntsville, and one of the best suburbs to live in both Alabama, and the country. Madison has many Fortune 500 companies that have operations in the city, including Intergraph (now Hexagon AB) that was headquartered here and was on the Fortune 500 for much of the early 2000s. Madison is the 9th largest city in Alabama and is also one of the fastest growing cities in the state, with a population of just under 60,000 in 2022 Madison City Schools, the school board that provides education for Madison and the nearby city of Triana is the best school board in Alabama and its two high schools, James Clemens, and Bob jones ranked 6th and 8th in the state respectively.
- Muscle Shoals, Alabama, considered part of the Shoals along with Florence, Sheffield, and Tuscumbia, is a major city of northwest Alabama, along U.S. Route 72 and Alabama 157. The city is located immediately across the Tennessee River from Florence. (The river divides Colbert County from Lauderdale County.) Muscle Shoals is famous for its 1960s Muscle Shoals Sound, produced at such studios as FAME Studios and Muscle Shoals Sound Studio, where many famous musicians and bands, such as Aretha Franklin, Bob Dylan, and The Rolling Stones, also have recorded and produced numerous songs. Tuscumbia is the birthplace of Helen Keller. The original Congressional Act creating the government-owned Tennessee Valley Authority, May, 1933, designated the government reservation at Wilson Dam as the location for the headquarters of the TVA. In 1980, a court order reassigned the headquarters to Knoxville. The second largest city in the Shoals Metropolitan Area after Florence. It is home to 17,000 people.
- Scottsboro, Alabama, located about halfway between Huntsville and Chattanooga, about 63 miles (101 km) from Chattanooga and 40 miles (64 km) east of Huntsville, It is located on Highway 72. nicknamed "the Friendly City", It was founded in the mid-1850s and is most famous for the Scottsboro Boys and the Unclaimed Baggage Center, as well as "First Monday," an open-air marketplace held in and around downtown on Mondays following the first weekend of the month. It is the county seat of Jackson County, Alabama. Scottsboro is home to just under 16,000 people.

== Transportation ==
=== Interstates ===
- I-24 connects Paducah, Kentucky, at the mouth of the Tennessee River, with Chattanooga via Clarksville and Nashville. Much of this road's route in Kentucky and Tennessee actually lies outside the Tennessee Valley.
- I-26 is an east–west main route of the Interstate Highway System in the Northeast Tennessee. It runs from the junction of U.S. Route 11W and U.S. Route 23 in Kingsport, Tennessee, generally south and southeast to U.S. Route 17 in Charleston, South Carolina.
- I-40 runs west–east across the Tennessee portion of the Tennessee Valley, connecting Nashville with Knoxville and Asheville, North Carolina.
- I-59 runs along the border of the Tennessee Valley, connecting Chattanooga with New Orleans, Louisiana.
- I-65 is the main north–south road in the central part of the valley, connecting Birmingham, Huntsville, Decatur, and Nashville.
- I-565 / SR 20 / US 72 Alt. is the main corridor of the Huntsville-Decatur Combined Statistical Area that links the Huntsville Metropolitan Area and the Decatur Metropolitan Area, along with all of the scientific research and space exploration institutions in North Alabama. The road also provides a vital link to I-65 for both urban and suburban areas.
- I-75 runs down the middle of the valley of East Tennessee. It connects Chattanooga and Knoxville with Atlanta, Georgia and Cincinnati, Ohio.
- I-81 is a north–south highway that connects areas east of Knoxville to the Tri-State area of Tennessee and Virginia.

=== Airports ===
- Chattanooga Metropolitan Airport, Chattanooga
- Huntsville International Airport, Huntsville
- McGhee Tyson Airport, Alcoa, Tennessee (serves the Knoxville metropolitan area)
- Northwest Alabama Regional Airport, Muscle Shoals
- Pryor Field Regional Airport, Decatur
- Tri-Cities Regional Airport, Blountville, Tennessee (serves the Tri-Cities area and Southwest Virginia)
- Guntersville Municipal Airport (also known as Joe Starnes Field) in Guntersville, Alabama

=== River Ports ===
- Chattanooga
- Decatur
- Florence
- Guntersville
- Knoxville
- Muscle Shoals
- Paducah

== See also ==
- Tennessee Valley Authority
- Finger, J. R. (2001) Tennessee Frontiers: Three Regions in Transition. Indiana University Press.
