= Alabama State Route 184 =

State highway in Alabama, United States

State Route 184

Route information
- Maintained by ALDOT
- Length: 14.891 mi (23.965 km)

Major junctions
- West end: US 43 / US 72 / SR 17 / SR 20 / SR 157 on the Sheffield - Muscle Shoals city line
- SR 133 in Muscle Shoals
- East end: SR 101 north of Town Creek

Location
- Country: United States
- State: Alabama
- Counties: Colbert, Lawrence

Highway system
- Alabama State Highway System; Interstate; US; State
| ← SR 183 | → SR 185 |

State Route 184 (SR 184) is a 14.891-mile (23.965 km) state highway that serves as an east-west connection between Sheffield and SR 101. SR 184 intersects US 43/US 72 at its western terminus and SR 101 at its eastern terminus in Lawrence County.

== Route description ==
SR 184 begins at its intersection with US 43/72 in Sheffield. From this point, the route travels in an easterly direction intersecting SR 133 and the access road to the Northwest Alabama Regional Airport. SR 184 then continues its eastern track through its eastern terminus at SR 101.

== Major intersections ==
| County | Location | mi | km | Destinations | Notes |
|---|---|---|---|---|---|
| Colbert | Sheffield–Muscle Shoals line | 0.0 | 0.0 | US 43 / US 72 / SR 17 / SR 20 / SR 157 (SR 2/SR 13) – Florence, Cherokee, Littleville | Western terminus; road continues into downtown Sheffield as E 2nd Street |
| Colbert | Muscle Shoals | 1.857 | 2.989 | SR 133 (Wilson Dam Road) – Spring Valley, Florence | |
| Colbert | Muscle Shoals | 2.684 | 4.319 | Webster Street - Northwest Alabama Regional Airport | |
| Colbert | | 7.874 | 12.672 | County Line Road - Leighton, Ford City | |
| Lawrence | | 14.891 | 23.965 | SR 101 – Town Creek, Lexington | Eastern terminus |
1.000 mi = 1.609 km; 1.000 km = 0.621 mi
