= U.S. Route 72 =

Highway in the United States

U.S. Route 72
- Corridor V
- US 72 highlighted in red

Route information
- Length: 317.811 mi (511.467 km)
- Existed: 1926–present

Major junctions
- West end: US 51 / US 64 / US 70 / US 79 in Memphis, TN
- I-240 at Memphis, TN; I-269 at Collierville, TN; US 45 at Corinth, MS; US 43 / US 72 Alt. / SR 17 / SR 20 in Muscle Shoals, AL; I-65 in Athens, AL; US 231 / US 431 in Huntsville, AL; I-565 in Huntsville, AL; I-24 / US 64 in Kimball, TN; US 41 / SR 28 in Jasper, TN; I-24 in Chattanooga, TN
- East end: US 41 / US 76 in Chattanooga, TN

Location
- Country: United States
- States: Tennessee, Mississippi, Alabama
- Counties: TN: Shelby, Fayette; MS: Marshall, Benton, Tippah, Alcorn, Tishomingo; AL: Colbert, Lauderdale, Limestone, Madison, Jackson; TN: Marion, Hamilton

Highway system
- United States Numbered Highway System; List; Special; Divided
- Tennessee State Routes; Interstate; US; State
- Mississippi State Highway System; Interstate; US; State
- Alabama State Highway System; Interstate; US; State
← US 71	→ US 73
← SR 71	TN	→ SR 72
← MS 69	MS	→ MS 76
← SR 71	AL	→ SR 73
← SR 1	AL SR 2	→ SR 3

U.S. Route 72 (US 72) is an east–west United States highway that travels for 317.811 miles (511.467 km) from southwestern Tennessee, throughout North Mississippi, North Alabama, and southeastern Tennessee. The highway's western terminus is in Memphis, Tennessee, and its eastern terminus is in Chattanooga. It is the only U.S. Highway to begin and end in the same state, yet pass through other states in between. Prior to the U.S. Highway system signage being posted in 1926, the section eastward from Corinth, Mississippi (covering nearly three quarters of the route) was part of the Lee Highway.

== Route description ==
The highway passes through Tennessee, Alabama, and Mississippi. Most of the original eastern and western portions of the route through roughly follows the path of the Memphis and Charleston Railroad, a railroad that predated the American Civil War and now operated by Norfolk Southern Railway as their Memphis-Chattanooga, Tennessee, mainline. US 72 Alt. follows the Memphis and Charleston route through North Alabama.

=== West Tennessee ===
US 72 begins at Bellevue Boulevard (US 51) in Memphis. From Memphis, the route follows Union Avenue and Poplar Avenue into Collierville. Just south of Collierville, US 72 junctions with State Route 385 (the Bill Morris Parkway), a freeway which links Collierville with I-240. The route enters Mississippi 3 miles (4.8 km) southeast of SR 385. This segment of the highway is concurrently designated State Route 86 (SR 86) south of its concurrency with SR 57 between Union Avenue in Memphis and Collierville.

=== Mississippi ===
US 72 enters Mississippi in western Marshall County. The route follows rolling hills across the extreme northern part of the state, passing through Walnut and Corinth as it heads east. Near Burnsville, US 72 crosses the Divide Cut of the Tennessee–Tombigbee Waterway. Farther east, the route enters the Tennessee Valley and heads through Iuka before crossing into Alabama.

All of US 72 in Mississippi has been widened to four-lane highway, with the last two lane section between MS 302 and the Tennessee state line being completed in 2019. Legally, the Mississippi section of US 72 is defined in the Mississippi Code §65-3-3.

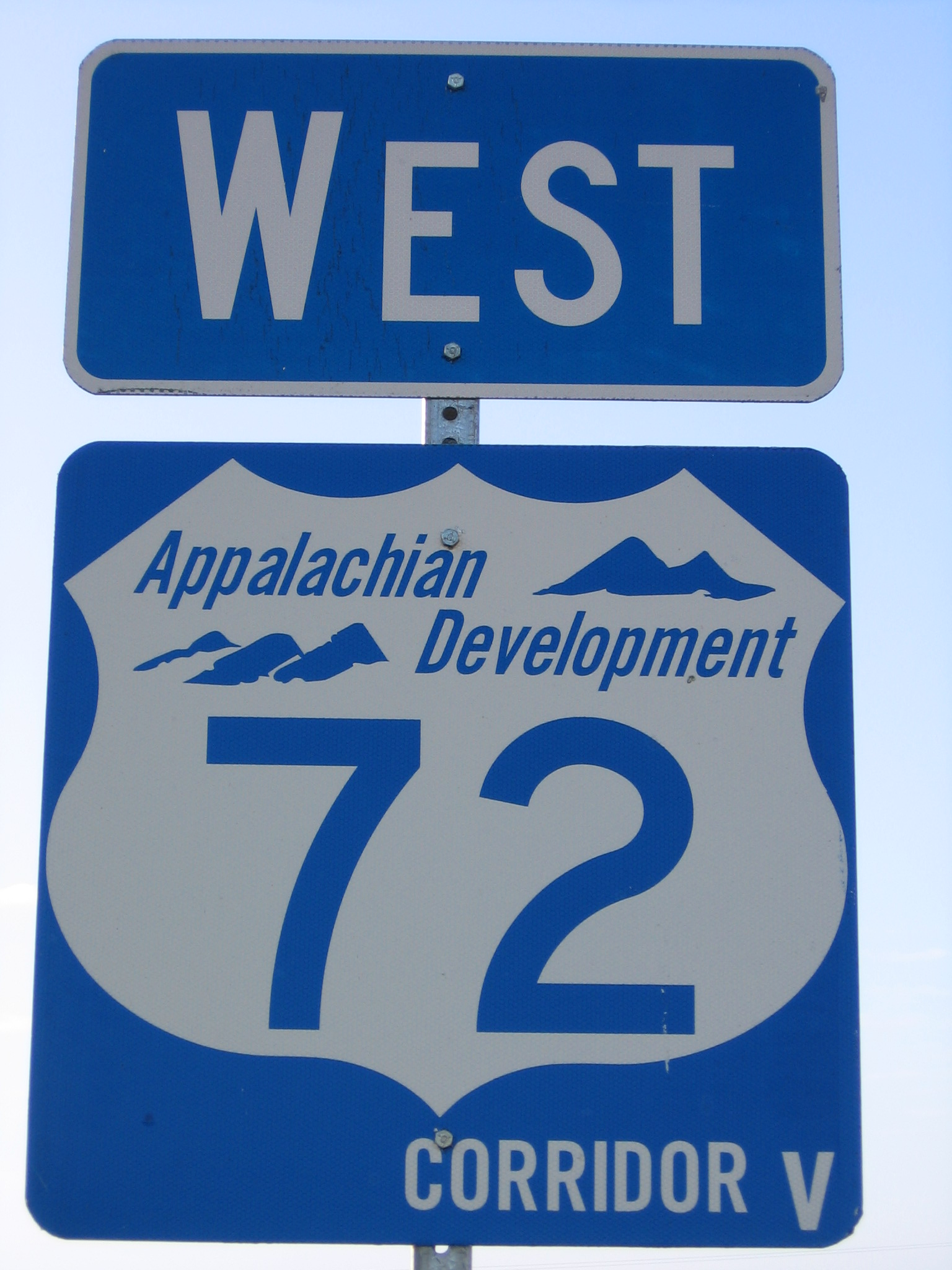
A reassurance shield for US 72/Corridor V

=== Alabama ===
US 72 enters Alabama just west of Cherokee. The route parallels the Tennessee River east to Muscle Shoals, where US 72 Alternate splits from US 72. The mainline turns north, passing through Muscle Shoals and crossing the Tennessee River, entering Florence on the opposite bank. From Florence to Huntsville, the route heads through areas dominated by farmland. Between the two locales, however, US 72 enters Athens.

After passing through Athens and an overpass with Interstate 65 (I-65), US 72 approaches Huntsville from the west. Part of this section has the local name University Drive. At an interchange with Memorial Parkway, the route turns northward briefly, joining the routes of US 231 and US 431, until it breaks off from the Parkway and heads eastward again. (This part is known to locals as "72 East" because it is east of the Parkway; it has no other name.) Northeast of downtown Huntsville, US 72 interchanges with I-565. I-565/US 72 Alt., part of Corridor V of the Appalachian Development Highway System, terminates at the interchange while US 72 takes over the freeway alignment, joining Corridor V.

I-565 is mentioned as the eastbound route and SR 20 is mentioned as the westbound route. Signs for I-565 east at this interchange recently were changed to remove any mention of SR 20 east. Most of the US 72 portion of Corridor V is a four-lane divided expressway with at-grade intersections. Past Huntsville, US 72 follows several mountain valleys to Scottsboro. From Scottsboro, the route follows a northeasterly routing similar to that of the Tennessee River as it enters Tennessee for the second time.

All of US 72 within Alabama is four lanes in width. Additionally, much of US 72 has been built through northeast Alabama with interchanges at the major state highways. Just west of Moores Mill Road in Huntsville, US 72 becomes limited access over Chapman Mountain. Throughout Alabama, US 72 is paired with unsigned State Route 2 (SR 2).

The stretch of US 72 paralleling I-59 to the far northeast in between Scottsboro and South Pittsburg contains multiple freeway-style Interchanges.

=== East Tennessee ===
US 72 enters Tennessee for the second time just south of South Pittsburg. At South Pittsburg, Corridor V ends at an interchange with Interstate 24. US 64, concurrent with I-24 west of the exit, departs the expressway and forms an overlap with US 72 through Kimball to Jasper, where US 41 joins the concurrency. Just east of Jasper, the highways cross the Tennessee River on Nickajack Lake. The route then follows a cut in the Cumberland Plateau made by the Tennessee River to the western outskirts of Chattanooga, where it interchanges with I-24 once more. Just east of the interchange, US 11 joins the overlap.

Together, US 11, US 41, US 64, and US 72 follow the bluffs on Lookout Mountain above the Tennessee River to Chattanooga, where the routes follow Broad Street north into downtown. At the corner of Main Street and Broad Street, US 72 comes to an end; US 76 begins at the intersection, making one highway in essence a continuation of the other.

== History ==
Much of US 72 roughly follows the path of the Memphis and Charleston Railroad, constructed in the 1850s. The section of US 72 between Kimball and Chattanooga, concurrent with US 41 and US 64, was part of the historic Dixie Highway, an auto trail. Throughout the 20th century, US 72 was known as the "Bee-line to Memphis" along its eastern segments.

=== West Tennessee ===
Originally, US 72 followed US 45 to Selmer and followed a route west to Memphis. In 1931, US 64 replaced US 72 between Memphis and Selmer. In 1935, US 72 was routed to Memphis through Mississippi from Corinth removing the extension on US 45 to Selmer.

As late as the early 1970s, US 72 followed State Route 57 (Poplar Avenue) from Collierville to its western terminus at East Parkway N. (which carried US 64, US 70, and US 79, as well as State Route 1). During the mid-1980s until the early 2000s, U.S. 72's westbound route in midtown Memphis was changed to switch from Poplar Avenue to a westbound off-ramp connection with Union Avenue (just as its name changed from Walnut Grove Road), instead of following Poplar west to East Parkway North. (In the same trend, eastbound US 72 ignored East Parkway South and continued eastward on Union—joining SR 57—until an exit ramp deposited the two highways onto eastbound Poplar.) Some signs still remain from this route change.

=== Mississippi ===
In Tishomingo County, US 72 originally followed the current Road 172 / Quitman Street through Iuka before being bypassed in the mid-1980s. Also, An Old US 72 exists south of US 72 between Burnsville and Glen. US 72 also followed Alcorn County Road 218 and entered Corinth on Proper Street. Until 1935, US 72 followed US 45, now Polk Street / Mississippi Highway 145 north into Tennessee. Also, included in the original 1935 routing west of Corinth followed Mississippi State Route 2 / Kossuth Road to Kossuth before turning west. Continuing westward, yet another segment of Old US 72 exists south of US 72 in Benton County from just west of the Tippah County line to just east of the Wolf River near Canaan. The bridge across the Wolf River collapsed due to flooding and is now closed; much of this segment is now on private property and little evidence of pavement remains due to washout and ecological succession. The continuation of this segment west of Wolf River to Mississippi Highway 5 is signed Wyatt Road. Finally, there is one more route that may have been a former US 72 road alignment. Boswell Road begins as a curve off of US 72 between Slayden and Mount Pleasant as a gravel road, and heads generally parallel to US 72 as a gravel road, before stopping in Mount Pleasant at Mississippi Highway 311. The possible former alignment then continues from the staggered junction heading west as a partially paved road. This road is now broken by Mississippi Highway 302, but continues to head west as a gravel road for a mile, for a total of approximately 3.5 miles (5.6 km).

In late 2019, work was completed on the last widening project in Mississippi, six miles (9.7 km) extending to the Tennessee state line. This was the last section of US 72 between its western terminus and US 41/64 in Kimball, Tennessee, to be widened to four lanes.

=== Alabama and East Tennessee ===
Most of the original US 72 route in Alabama paralleled the Memphis and Charleston Railroad, a critical route for the South during the American Civil War. Some sections of the original road were named the Memphis Pike reflecting the idea of connecting Chattanooga to Memphis, Tennessee. The original route also belonged to the original route of the Lee Highway. Both of these designations can be found in western Colbert County where sections of the original highway, including parts of Colbert County Route 20 still bear those names.

The original route once passed through Tuscumbia on what is named today the Old Lee Highway and Main Street. This route was bypassed in the 1960s. In Florence US 72 originally followed Huntsville Road to Royal Avenue, then north to Tennessee Street, and finally west to Court Street. Its route was later moved two blocks south through downtown Florence, from Tennessee Street to Dr. Hicks Boulevard.

East of Florence the original route is now County Highway 66 through downtown Rogersville and Killen. Athens' Clinton and Washington Streets hosted a Business 72 route in earlier years. This route was decommissioned in the 1980s. US 72 has seen several route changes in Huntsville that included a temporary route down Sparkman Drive in the 1960s. Other original routes include Andrew Jackson Way to Holmes Avenue and down Holmes Avenue to reconnect to the original route. Prior to 1931, US 72 passed through Big Cove between Huntsville and Paint Rock via Little Cove Rd/Old "US 431". That route was abandoned for the one used today over Chapman Mountain.

In June 1996, the three-mile (4.8 km) bypass around South Pittsburg, Tennessee, stretching from Alabama SR 277 to north of Tennessee SR 156, was completed by both states. Construction on the final four-lane section in Alabama, 6.8 miles (10.9 km) between Stevenson and SR 277, began on June 19, 1995, and was opened to traffic on August 7, 1998.

Other original routes include SR 35 from Woodville to the west side of Scottsboro, SR 279 east of Scottsboro, and SR 277 from Stevenson to Bridgeport. SR 277 carries the distinction of being the last two-lane section of US 72 in Alabama. Today, the entire route through Alabama has a minimum of four lanes.

The original bridges on I-24 across US 72 in Kimball had a low clearance, and were often hit by large trucks. From August 26, 2010, to September 2012, the bridges were replaced with a single span with a higher clearance, and a new westbound off-ramp from I-24 was built to connect to US 64/72 eastbound.

== Major intersections ==
State	County	Location	mi (Note: Mileage resets at state lines)	km	Destinations	Notes
Tennessee	Shelby	Memphis	0.00	0.00	US 51 south (S. Bellevue Boulevard) US 51 north / US 64 west / US 70 west / US 79 south (Union Avenue)	Western terminus; western end of US 64/US 70/US 79/SR 23 overlaps; western terminus of SR 23
Tennessee	Shelby	Memphis	2.1	3.4	SR 277 (East Parkway) / US 64 east / US 70 east / US 79 north	Eastern end of US 64/US 70/US 79 overlaps
Tennessee	Shelby	Memphis	3.1	5.0	Walnut Grove Road (SR 23 east) / Poplar Avenue (SR 57 west)	Eastern end of SR 23 overlap; western end of SR 57 overlap; no direct access from US 72 east to SR 57 west or from US 72 west to SR 23 east
Tennessee	Shelby	Memphis	8.7– 9.1	14.0– 14.6	I-240 – Jackson Miss, Nashville	I-240 exits 15A-B
Tennessee	Shelby	Memphis			Ridgeway Center Parkway / Sweetbriar Road	Partial interchange, westbound only; intersection eastbound
Tennessee	Shelby	Germantown	12.4	20.0	SR 177 south (West Street)	Western end of SR 177 overlap; route signed westbound only
Tennessee	Shelby	Germantown	12.6	20.3	SR 177 north (Germantown Road)	Eastern end of SR 177 overlap
Tennessee	Shelby	Collierville	20.3	32.7	SR 175 west (Byhalia Road)	Eastern terminus of SR 175
Tennessee	Shelby	Collierville	20.6	33.2	SR 57 east (Tennessee Scenic Parkway east) / SR 86 begins – Moscow, Pickwick	Eastern end of SR 57 overlap; western end of SR 86 overlap
Tennessee	Shelby	Collierville	22.7	36.5	SR 385 (Bill Morris Parkway) to I-240 / I-269 – Memphis, Arlington	Interchange on SR 385; To I-269 signed eastbound only
Tennessee	Shelby–Fayette county line	Collierville–Piperton line	23.7– 24.0	38.1– 38.6	I-269 – Arlington, Tunica, Miss	I-269 exit 1
Tennessee	Fayette	Piperton	25.5	41.0	SR 196 north	Southern terminus of SR 196
Tennessee–Mississippi line			25.7 0.00	41.4 0.00	SR 86 ends	
Mississippi	Marshall		1.1– 1.3	1.8– 2.1	Industrial Road / Wingo Road	Interchange
Mississippi	Marshall		4.4– 5.3	7.1– 8.5	MS 302 west – Southaven, Olive Branch	Interchange; eastern terminus of MS 302
Mississippi	Marshall	Mount Pleasant	6.4	10.3	MS 311 south – Holly Springs, Strawberry Plains Audubon Center	Northern terminus of MS 311
Mississippi	Benton		18.8	30.3	MS 7 – Holly Springs, Michigan City	Roundabout
Mississippi	Benton		23.7	38.1	MS 5 south – Ashland	
Mississippi	Tippah	Walnut	41.3	66.5	MS 15 – Ripley, Bolivar	
Mississippi	Alcorn	Corinth	60.6	97.5	MS 2 west (Kossuth Road) – Kossuth, Ripley	Western end of MS 2 overlap
Mississippi	Alcorn	Corinth	61.8– 62.0	99.5– 99.8	US 45 / MS 2 east – Tupelo, Jackson Tenn.	Eastern end of MS 2 overlap; interchange on US 45
Mississippi	Alcorn	Corinth	63.0	101.4	Tate Street (MS 145) – Downtown Corinth	Destination signed eastbound only
Mississippi	Alcorn	Corinth	63.9	102.8	MS 785 north (Cass Street) – Downtown Corinth	Southern terminus of MS 785; destination signed westbound only
Mississippi	Alcorn	Glen	70.8	113.9	MS 779 north	Route is unsigned
Mississippi	Tishomingo	Burnsville	76.4	123.0	MS 365 – Cairo, Savannah Tenn.	Interchange
Mississippi	Tishomingo		78.3	126.0	MS 172 east	Western terminus of MS 172
Mississippi	Tishomingo	Iuka	83.6– 84.1	134.5– 135.3	MS 25 – Iuka, Fulton	Interchange
Mississippi	Tishomingo		89.6	144.2	MS 172 west	Eastern terminus of MS 172
Mississippi–Alabama line			89.8 0.00	144.5 0.00	SR 2 begins	
Alabama	Colbert		5.7	9.2	Natchez Trace Parkway	Interchange via connector road
Alabama	Colbert	Barton	12.7	20.4	CR 312 east – Barton Riverfront Industrial Park, Essity	Interchange
Alabama	Colbert	Pride	17.686	28.463	SR 247 south – Red Bay	Northern terminus of SR 247
Alabama	Colbert	Tuscumbia–Muscle Shoals line	26.178	42.129	US 43 south / SR 17 south (SR 13 south) – Russellville US 72 Alt. east / SR 20 east – Decatur	Western end of US 43/SR 17/SR 20 overlap; western terminus of US 72 Alt.
Alabama	Colbert	Muscle Shoals–Sheffield line	29.506	47.485	SR 184 east (Second Street)	Western terminus of SR 184; serves Northwest Alabama Regional Airport
Alabama	Tennessee River		31.186	50.189	O'Neal Bridge	
Alabama	Lauderdale	Florence	31.932	51.390	SR 20 west – Savannah Tn	Interchange; no eastbound entrance; eastern end of SR 20 overlap
Alabama	Lauderdale	Florence	33.1	53.3	Stadium	Interchange; no westbound entrance
Alabama	Lauderdale	Florence	33.770	54.348	SR 157 (Helton Drive) / SR 17 north – Muscle Shoals, Waynesboro Tn, Braly Stadium	Interchange; eastern end of SR 17 overlap
Alabama	Lauderdale	Florence	36.093	58.086	SR 133 (Cox Creek Parkway)	Serves Northwest Alabama Regional Airport and North Alabama Medical Center
Alabama	Lauderdale		40.489	65.161	US 43 north / SR 13 north	Eastern end of US 43/SR 13 overlap
Alabama	Lauderdale	Elgin	50.176	80.750	SR 101 – Town Creek, Lexington, Wheeler Dam	
Alabama	Lauderdale	Rogersville	55.966	90.069	SR 207 north (Wheeler Street) / CR 91 (Lambs Ferry Road) – Pulaski, Anderson	Southern terminus of SR 207
Alabama	Limestone	Athens	75.766	121.934	US 31 (Bee Line Highway) – Decatur, Nashville	Decatur signed westbound only; interchange on US 31
Alabama	Limestone	Athens	76.756	123.527	I-65 – Birmingham, Nashville	I-65 exit 351
Alabama	Madison	Huntsville	92.902	149.511	SR 255 (Research Park Boulevard) to I-565 / SR 53	Interchange on SR 255
Alabama	Madison	Huntsville	95.412	153.551	SR 53 (Jordan Lane)	
Alabama	Madison	Huntsville	97.034	156.161	US 231 south / US 431 south (Memorial Parkway) to I-565 / University Drive	Western end of US 231 / US 431 overlap
Alabama	Madison	Huntsville	98.711	158.860	US 231 north / US 431 north (Memorial Parkway) / Sparkman Drive	Eastern end of US 231 / US 431 overlap
Alabama	Madison	Huntsville	100.203	161.261	I-565 west (US 72 Alt. west) – Decatur	Eastern terminus of I-565 / US 72 Alt.; Decatur signed westbound only; I-565 exit 21
Alabama	Jackson		116.046	186.758	SR 65 north	Southern terminus of SR 65
Alabama	Jackson	Woodville	120.973	194.687	SR 35 south (Willow Street) – Woodville	Northern terminus of SR 35
Alabama	Jackson	Scottsboro	132.879	213.848	SR 79	
Alabama	Jackson	Scottsboro	136.725	220.038	SR 279 south (South Broad Street) / South Broad Street	Western end of SR 279 overlap; interchange
Alabama	Jackson	Scottsboro	138.554	222.981	SR 35 / SR 279 north (Veterans Drive)	Eastern end of SR 279 overlap; interchange
Alabama	Jackson		142.004	228.533	SR 279 south (East Willow Street) – Scottsboro	Northern terminus of SR 279
Alabama	Jackson	Stevenson	155.848	250.813	SR 117 – Stevenson	Interchange
Alabama	Jackson	Stevenson	158.320	254.791	SR 277 north – Stevenson	Interchange
Alabama	Jackson	Bridgeport	165.983	267.124	SR 277 south – Bridgeport	Interchange
Alabama–Tennessee line			167.211 0.00	269.100 0.00	SR 2 ends	
Tennessee	Marion	South Pittsburg	2.2– 2.9	3.5– 4.7	SR 156 – South Pittsburg, New Hope	Interchange; westbound exit and eastbound entrance provide access to Jaycee Drive
Tennessee	Marion	Kimball	4.2– 4.5	6.8– 7.2	I-24 west / US 64 – Chattanooga, Nashville	Western end of US 64 overlap; I-24 exits 152A-B
Tennessee	Marion	Kimball	4.5	7.2	SR 2 north (Battle Creek Road)	Western end of SR 2 overlap
Tennessee	Marion	Jasper	9.4– 9.5	15.1– 15.3	US 41 north / SR 28 to I-24 – Dunlap	Western end of US 41 overlap; interchange on SR 28
Tennessee	Marion		12.6	20.3	SR 27 to I-24 – Nickajack, Dunlap	
Tennessee	Marion	Haletown	15.2	24.5	SR 134 east (J.E. Clouse Highway) to I-24 / SR 156 – Whiteside	Western terminus of SR 134
Tennessee	Hamilton	Chattanooga	29.5– 29.6	47.5– 47.6	I-24 – Nashville, Birmingham, Chattanooga	I-24 exit 174
Tennessee	Hamilton	Chattanooga	29.7	47.8	US 11 south / SR 38 south (Birmingham Highway)	Western end of US 11 overlap
Tennessee	Hamilton	Chattanooga	31.3	50.4	SR 318 south (Old Wauhatchie Pike)	Northern terminus of SR 318
Tennessee	Hamilton	Chattanooga	32.3	52.0	SR 148 south – Ruby Falls, Lookout Mountain	No direct access from US 72 east to SR 148 south and from SR 148 north to US 72 west; northern terminus of SR 148
Tennessee	Hamilton	Chattanooga	33.3	53.6	SR 17 south (Tennessee Avenue) to SR 58 – Incline, Rock City	Western end of SR 17 overlap
Tennessee	Hamilton	Chattanooga	34.6	55.7	US 27 north (I-124 north / SR 29 north) – Downtown, Red Bank	No westbound exit; entrance ramp includes direct entrance from eastbound I-24 (exit 178A)
Tennessee	Hamilton	Chattanooga	34.8	56.0	US 11 north / US 64 east / SR 2 east (20th Street) to I-24	Eastern end of US 11/US 64 overlap
Tennessee	Hamilton	Chattanooga	35.1	56.5	US 41 south / US 76 east / SR 8 / SR 17	Eastern terminus; eastern end of US 41/SR 17 overlap; western terminus of US 76; highway continues as SR 8 north (Broad Street north)
1.000 mi = 1.609 km; 1.000 km = 0.621 mi: Concurrency terminus; Incomplete access

== Related routes ==
=== Muscle Shoals–Huntsville alternate route ===
U.S. Route 72 Alternate
- Location: Muscle Shoals to Huntsville, Alabama

U.S. Route 72 Alternate (US 72 Alternate) exists in Alabama on the south side of the Tennessee River between Muscle Shoals and Decatur. US 72 alt. crosses the Tennessee River at Decatur along with US 31 and follows the entire route of Interstate 565. However, signs on I-65 at the I-565 exit make no mention of US 72 Alt. and only mention SR 20 westbound from the I-65/I-565 junction. SR 20 was co-signed with US 72 Alt. from Muscle Shoals to Huntsville. SR 20 has since been truncated to the junction of I-65 just east of Decatur. Originally, US 72 Alt. turned off of SR 20 on to SR 53 (Jordan Lane) in Huntsville and followed it north 1-mile (1.6 km) to rejoin with US 72. With the completion of I-565 in the early 1990s, US 72 Alt. was routed along with I-565 to the termination of I-565 at US 72.

US 72 Alternate between Decatur and Huntsville is part of Corridor V of the Appalachian Development Highway System.

== See also ==
- Southern Rock Opera, a Drive-By Truckers album prominently featuring US 72
- List of United States Numbered Highways
