= KMSL =

KMSL may refer to:

- KMSL (AM), a defunct radio station licensed to Ukiah, California, United States
- KMSL (FM), a radio station (91.7 FM) licensed to Mansfield, Louisiana, United States
- the ICAO code for Northwest Alabama Regional Airport, in Muscle Shoals, Alabama, United States
