= Alabama State Route 277 =

State highway in Alabama, United States

State Route 277

Route information
- Maintained by ALDOT
- Length: 9.350 mi (15.047 km)
- Existed: March 2003–present

Major junctions
- South end: US 72 in Stevenson
- North end: US 72 in Bridgeport

Location
- Country: United States
- State: Alabama
- Counties: Jackson

Highway system
- Alabama State Highway System; Interstate; US; State
← SR 275	→ US 278

State Route 277 (SR 277) is a 9.350-mile (15.047 km) state highway in the northern part of the U.S. state of Alabama, traveling along part of former U.S. Route 72 (US 72) in Jackson County.

== History ==
Upon completion of the present US 72 expressway in the 1990s, the old road was given to the county and cities of Stevenson and Bridgeport to maintain as County Road 74 (CR 74), but the local governments convinced the state to take back the road, which was redesignated SR 277 in March 2003.

County leaders and city leaders in Bridgeport and Stevenson were not happy about the road being their responsibility and turned down requests to take the road back several times. The roadway has many bridges and is designed in such a way that maintenance of the road was deemed too expensive for Jackson County. After a large effort by the county and local state legislators to get the route back under state control, ALDOT reluctantly took back the highway as SR 277, insisting that they would swap mileage with SR 35 west of Scottsboro. However, that mileage swap never occurred and SR 35 west of Scottsboro remains a state-controlled highway.

SR 277 does not include all of former US 72. The route is 9 kilometres (5.6 mi) long and only includes the portions between the interchange of old US 72 and US 72 east of Stevenson to US 72 just east of Bridgeport.

SR 277 travels on the original Memphis and Charleston Railroad bed.

== Major intersections ==
The entire route is in Jackson County.

Location	mi	km	Destinations	Notes
Stevenson	0.0	0.0	East 2nd Street	Southern terminus; continuation into downtown Stevenson; old US 72
Stevenson	0.252	0.406	US 72 (John T. Reid Parkway / SR 2) – Scottsboro, Bridgeport	Interchange
Bridgeport	9.20	14.81	US 72 (John T. Reid Parkway / SR 2) – Stevenson, South Pittsburg	Interchange
Bridgeport	9.258	14.899	CR 74 / CR 209 west	Northern terminus; old US 72 continues on CR 74 east into South Pittsburg, Tennessee
1.000 mi = 1.609 km; 1.000 km = 0.621 mi
