= Interstate 565 =

Interstate Highway in Alabama

Interstate 565
- I-565 highlighted in red

Route information
- Auxiliary route of I-65
- Maintained by ALDOT
- Length: 21.688 mi (34.903 km)
- Existed: 1991–present
- NHS: Entire route

Major junctions
- West end: I-65 / US 72 Alt. / SR 20 in Decatur
- SR 255 in Huntsville; SR 53 in Huntsville; US 231 / US 431 in Huntsville
- East end: US 72 / US 72 Alt. in Huntsville

Location
- Country: United States
- State: Alabama
- Counties: Limestone, Madison

Highway system
- Interstate Highway System; Main; Auxiliary; Suffixed; Business; Future; Alabama State Highway System; Interstate; US; State
← I-459	→ SR 605

Interstate 565 (I-565) is a roughly 22-mile-long (35 km) Interstate spur that connects I-65 in Decatur with U.S. Route 72 (US 72) in Huntsville in the US state of Alabama.

I-565 serves the cities of Decatur, Madison, and downtown Huntsville. It also provides a route to the Huntsville International Airport. The Interstate forms a part of Appalachian Development Highway System Corridor V. U.S. Route 72 Alternate (US 72 Alt.) travels concurrently with I-565 for its entire length, although it is unsigned.

== Route description ==
I-565's connection with the rest of the Interstate Highway System occurs at its western terminus, at an interchange with I-65. The interchange was extant prior to I-565's construction; it served State Route 20 (SR 20), which previously extended eastward into Huntsville. (The interchange was rebuilt and improved as part of the I-565 construction.) From the interchange, I-565 takes a brief northerly swing to bypass the town of Mooresville before joining and subsuming the former right-of-way of SR 20 through rural southeastern Limestone County. Progressing eastward, as the western edge of the city of Madison it diverges slightly to the south of the former SR 20 route, traveling parallel to it a short distance away. (This portion of the old SR 20 route is now named Madison Boulevard.) In Greenbrier, the route junctions with Greenbrier Road at a parclo interchange and County Line Road, which is among the most congested interchanges in the state. Immediately after the junction with County Line Road, the route enters Madison County and immediately junctions with the main thoroughfare for Huntsville International Airport.

Continuing east, I-565 goes through the southern part of Madison, rejoining the former SR 20 route near the Huntsville–Madison city line. Here, I-565 once again subsumes the old route's right-of-way as it travels along the south edge of Cummings Research Park and the University of Alabama in Huntsville campus and the north edge of Redstone Arsenal. At Governors Drive, I-565 takes a slight turn northward away from the old route and continues through an area generally referred to as "West Huntsville". It enters a two-mile-long (3.2 km) elevated highway stretch, mainly because of difficulties while planning through Wall Triana Boulevard. It has an interchange with Memorial Parkway just south of University Drive, and then, gradually curving toward the northeast, passes north of downtown Huntsville and through a former cotton mill district. At Oakwood Avenue, it subsumes what was once the easternmost 0.5 miles (0.80 km) of Andrew Jackson Way, traveling over Chapman Mountain to its eastern terminus where it joins US 72.

After the completion of I-565, the SR 20 designation was removed from all remaining portions of the former route east of I-65.

== History ==
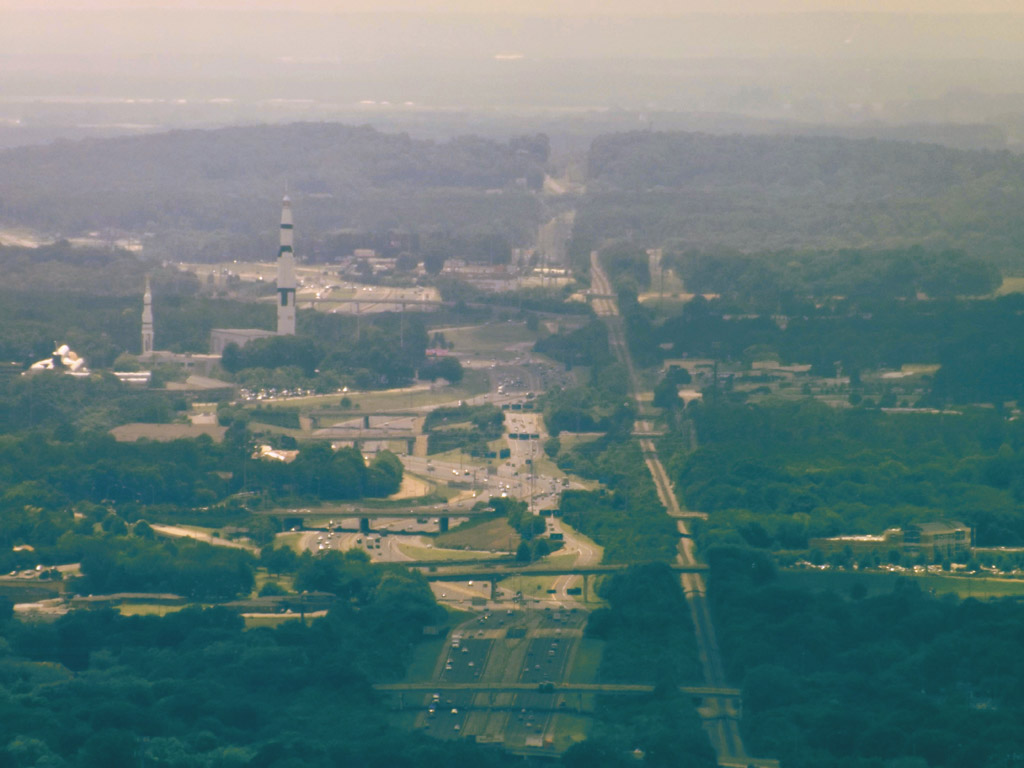
I-565 passing through the city of Huntsville

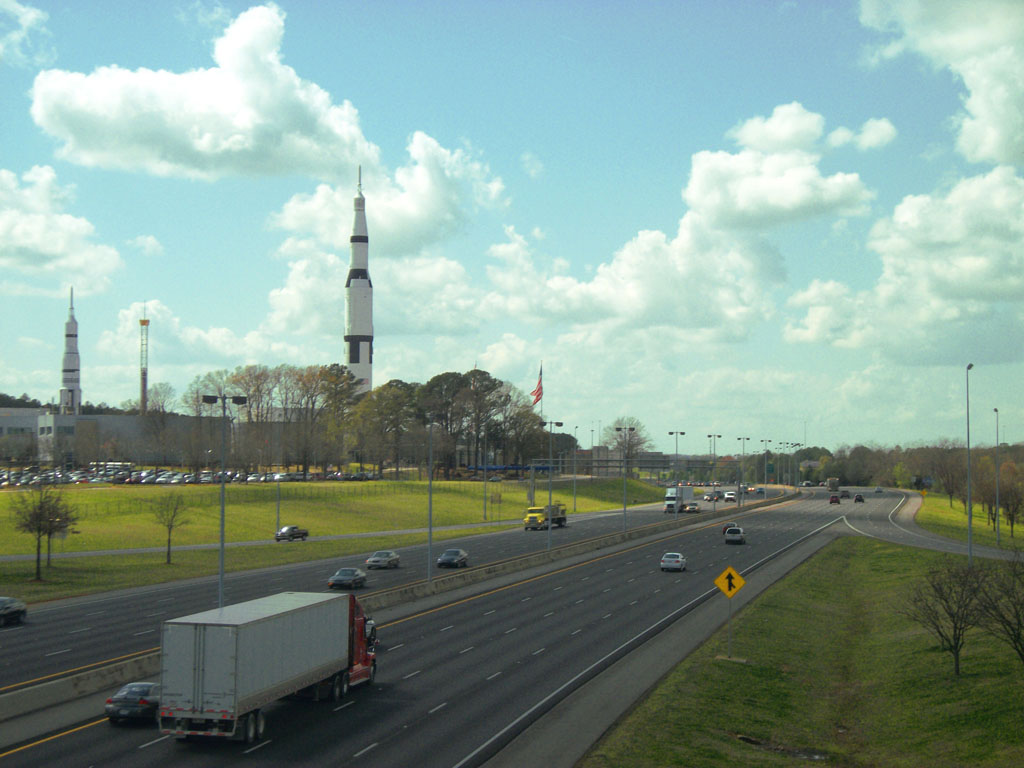
I-565 passing by the U.S. Space & Rocket Center

When the Interstate Highway System was first laid out during the mid-1950s, I-65 was routed on a north–south bee line connecting Nashville, Tennessee, with Birmingham, Alabama. This route passes just to the east of Decatur, which was a major river port on the Tennessee River at the time. Huntsville, however, was still a small town about 20 miles (32 km) east of I-65.

During the late 1950s and through the 1960s, Huntsville underwent massive population growth due to the establishment of the US Army Missile Command at Redstone Arsenal and the new NASA Marshall Space Flight Center. By 1960, Huntsville had grown to be more than twice the size of Decatur. It became clear that an Interstate Highway spur route would be beneficial to connect Huntsville with I-65 and to the rest of the country. I-565 was chosen as the Federal Highway Administration (FHWA)'s number for this proposed spur expressway. It was decided that, rather than terminating at the western edge of Huntsville, I-565 would extend farther eastward, providing an east–west freeway for Huntsville. On the eastern edge of Huntsville, I-565 was designed to feed into US 72, which was being widened to a four-lane highway traveling from Huntsville to Kimball, Tennessee, where it feeds into I-24.

Construction of I-565 began in 1987, and the freeway was opened on October 26, 1991. By the time construction had begun, Huntsville had become one of the most populous cities in the contiguous United States without a freeway connection to the Interstate system. Construction was performed in phases.

Phase 1 opened in 1989 and extended from the east side of Mooresville to County Line Road (exit 7, which was originally constructed to serve as a terminus taking traffic between I-565 and SR 20). At the time, traffic from I-65 still had to drive through Mooresville to where the Interstate started while the Mooresville overpasses and bridges over creeks were constructed.

Phase 2 added a bypass through Madison. The Interstate still ended at County Line Road, requiring traffic to take SR 20 through Madison until about Slaughter Road where a temporary entrance/exit merged traffic back onto I-565. The route then traveled along the old Governors Drive path past the Space and Rocket Center until it terminated with two lanes exiting at what is now the Governors Drive exit. This bypass through Madison allowed construction of the bridges over Zeirdt Road and the earthwork to be done near what is now the golf driving range and for construction of the Wall Triana exit and airport exit. The eastern terminus at Governors Drive was to allow for construction of the elevated sections crossing Memorial Parkway and extending over Pratt and Oakwood to the terminus at US 72.

Phase 3 opened the Interstate from County Line Road to the Governors Drive exit. This gave access via the Airport exit and Wall Triana exit.

Phase 4 was completed in 1991–1992, with the completion of the bridges and overpasses near Mooresville and the Interstate was opened directly from I-65, bypassing the city of Mooresville.

Phase 5 opened the "elevated sections" from Governors Drive to the US 72 intersection. At the time, this intersection with US 72 was no longer Interstate and was controlled by a red-light. This also opened the interchange of I-565 and Memorial Parkway.

When I-565 was first opened, it was signed as a north–south highway. This created some confusion because the highway travels roughly east–west. It was resigned soon after opening. In 1996, the entirety of I-565 was designated the "Admiral Alan B. Shepard Highway" in honor of astronaut Alan Shepard.

Unlike many urban Interstate Highways, which have a uniform speed limit of 55 mph (89 km/h), I-565 has a speed limit of 70 mph (110 km/h), continuing well into the city. Just west of the interchange with Memorial Parkway, the speed limit decreases to 65 mph (105 km/h) and remains so for the entire portion east.

=== Huntsville bus accident ===
On November 20, 2006, a school bus carrying high school students collided with another vehicle or swerved to avoid a collision and drove off an elevated offramp, falling nose-first approximately 30 feet (9.1 m) to the ground. Four teenage girls were killed in the accident.

=== Recent development ===
Phase 6 was completed in 2010. This slightly extended I-565 from the then red light at US 72 to the east end and converted the connection with US 72 from an at-grade intersection into a full interchange. This kept traffic going over Chapman Mountain from having to stop at the intersection which created morning and afternoon commuter backups. After this intersection, controlled access officially stops, but the highway is still a four-lane highway and does not require a stop until the red light at the bottom of Chapman Mountain at the Moores Mill intersection.

Work began on Phase 7 in December 2013 to upgrade the interchange of I-565 and County Line Road at exit 7, adding exits and onramps to for access to/from the east. The upgrade was budgeted to cost $30 million with the city of Madison funding $1.7 million of the project. The new interchange added ramps providing access for traffic exiting westbound and entering eastbound, so that the interchange now has a full set of ramps. The exit was reopened with new ramps in April 2015.

Construction of an interchange at Dunlap Boulevard is currently underway, with the exit being built along with areas around the Toyota Field. The exit is located in between Madison Boulevard and Wall Triana Highway exits. The exit was delayed because of the corona virus spreading and construction was delayed by several months. The exit cost will total somewhere around $20 million–30 million when completed.

== Future ==
An extension of I-565 west, from the current terminus at I-65, along the route of SR 20 and US 72 Alt. to its intersection with US 31 near Decatur, is also planned. In January 2007, politicians in Northwestern Alabama announced that they would launch a campaign to extend I-565 westward to Florence. I-565 is part of a proposed highway that would connect Memphis, Tennessee, with Atlanta, Georgia, via Rome, Georgia, and Chattanooga, Tennessee, as part of ISTEA High Priority Corridor 7.

The Huntsville "5 Year Plan" shows adding an additional westbound lane from Maysville Road to Shields Road (cost $9 million in FY2014) and closing the median opening where I-565 terminates into US 72 on Chapman Mountain. This would also include a connector road between Epworth Drive and Maysville Road (cost $5 million FY2014). In addition, "Projects Being Considered" to include additional lanes on I-565 from Wall Triana to County Line Road interchange (cost $60 million) and additional lanes on I-565 from County Line Road interchange to I-65 (cost $60 million). Three interstate message boards will also be added to the route in 2024 (it was originally expected to be put in 2023).

== Exit list ==
County	Location	mi	km	Exit	Destinations	Notes
Limestone	Decatur	0.00	0.00	—	SR 20 west (US 72 Alt. west) – Decatur	Western terminus; western end of US 72 Alt. concurrency; eastern terminus of SR 20
Limestone	Decatur–Huntsville city line	0.00	0.00	1	I-65 – Birmingham, Nashville	Signed as exits 1A (south) and 1B (north) eastbound; I-65 exit 340 northbound & 340A-B southbound
Limestone	Huntsville	1.26	2.03	2	Mooresville Road	
Limestone	Huntsville	3.47	5.58	3	Greenbrier Road	
Limestone–Madison county line	Huntsville	6.38– 7.02	10.27– 11.30	7	Madison Boulevard / County Line Road	Former SR-20 east
Madison	Huntsville	7.98	12.84	8	Huntsville International Airport	
Madison	Madison	9.19	14.79	9	Wall-Triana Highway / Madison Boulevard	
Madison	Madison	10.56	16.99	10	Town Madison Boulevard	Full interchange opened on March 21, 2025
Madison	Huntsville	13.02	20.95	13	Madison Boulevard	Westbound exit and eastbound entrance; former SR 20 west; to be rebuilt into a full interchange for improved access to Redstone Arsenal via new Resolute Way roadway
Madison	Huntsville	14.34	23.08	14	SR 255 north (Research Park Boulevard) – Redstone Arsenal Gate 9	Signed as exits 14A (Gate 9) and 14B (SR 255) westbound
Madison	Huntsville	15.77– 16.03	25.38– 25.80	15	Madison Pike, Sparkman Drive / Bob Wallace Avenue	Entrance to U.S. Space and Rocket Center
Madison	Huntsville	16.98	27.33	17A	SR 53 north (Jordan Lane) to US 72	Signed as exit 17 westbound
Madison	Huntsville	17.33	27.89	17B	SR 53 south (Governors Drive)	Eastbound exit and westbound entrance
Madison	Huntsville	19.02	30.61	19A	US 231 / US 431 (Memorial Parkway / SR 1)	Eastbound exit and westbound entrance; signed as exits 19A (south) and 19B (north)
Madison	Huntsville	19.02	30.61	19B	US 231 / US 431 (Memorial Parkway / SR 1) / Pratt Avenue west / Washington Street north	Westbound exit and eastbound entrance; eastern terminus of Pratt Avenue; southern terminus of Washington Street
Madison	Huntsville	19.38– 19.75	31.19– 31.78	19C	Washington Street / Jefferson Street – Downtown	Signed as exit 19A westbound
Madison	Huntsville	20.63	33.20	20	Oakwood Avenue / Andrew Jackson Way	
Madison	Huntsville	21.61	34.78	21	US 72 west (SR 2 west) / Maysville Road – Athens	
Madison	Huntsville	22.13	35.61		US 72 east (SR 2 east) – Scottsboro	Eastern terminus; eastbound exit and westbound entrance; eastern end of US 72 Alt. concurrency; eastern terminus of US 72 Alt.
1.000 mi = 1.609 km; 1.000 km = 0.621 mi: Concurrency terminus; Incomplete access; Unopened
