= Elgin, Alabama =

Unincorporated community in Alabama, United States

- Unincorporated community
- Location within Alabama Location within the United States
- Coordinates: 34°50′55″N 87°23′28″W
- Country: United States
- State: Alabama
- County: Lauderdale
- Elevation: 640 ft (200 m)
- Time zone: UTC-6 (Central (CST))
  - Summer (DST): UTC-5 (CDT)
- Postal code: 35652
- Area code: 256
- GNIS feature ID: 157944

Elgin, also known as Elgin Crossroads, Ingram's Crossroads, or Marmion, is an unincorporated community in Lauderdale County, in the U.S. state of Alabama. Elgin lies at the intersection of U.S. Route 72 and Alabama State Route 101.

== History ==
Elgin was originally known as Ingram's Crossroads, in honor of Benjamin Ingram, who owned the surrounding land. The name was then changed to Elgin in 1901, in honor of Elgin, Illinois. A post office was in operation under the name Marmion from 1836 to 1849, then under the name Ingram's Crossroads from 1849 to 1858, and finally under the name Elgin from 1901 to 1905.

== Fire Protection ==
Elgin Fire Department covers an area of 8 square miles providing approximately 4500 citizens with fire suppression and various rescue operations including: vehicle extrication, low angle rescue, water rescue, and wilderness search and rescue. Elgin Fire Department operates with an ISO Class 3. Elgin Fire Department also utilizes hybrid firefighters that are certified Paramedics or EMTs to answer every medical alarm in its coverage area providing assistance to the local Ambulance Service. Elgin Fire Department operates out of two stations, Station 1 being located in town in the Elgin Forest subdivision and Station 2 being located in the Whitehead community both of which house trucks and equipment to handle any kind of emergency. Station 1 also hosts an Advanced Life Support EMS unit that provides coverage to the citizens of surrounding towns as well as citizens within Elgin.
