= Oakland, Lauderdale County, Alabama =

Unincorporated community in Alabama, United States

- Unincorporated community
- Location within Alabama Location within the United States
- Coordinates: 34°50′30″N 87°47′56″W
- Country: United States
- State: Alabama
- County: Lauderdale
- Elevation: 554 ft (169 m)
- Time zone: UTC-6 (Central (CST))
  - Summer (DST): UTC-5 (CDT)
- Postal code: 35633
- Area code: 256
- GNIS feature ID: 124149

Oakland is an unincorporated community in Lauderdale County, Alabama, United States. Oakland is a quiet community on Waterloo Road that is between Florence and Waterloo. There used to be a functioning elementary school till the early 1980s. Oakland Gin is located in the heart of Oakland and runs every cotton season. Vaden/Scruggs Gin is located further out in Oakland. Crossroads Market and The Cotton Traders provide food and fuel for everyone traveling through. Oakland has a volunteer fire department.

Oakland is bordered by Florence to the east, Cloverdale to the north, Waterloo to the northwest, Central to the northeast, Cherokee to the southwest, Littleville to the south, and Tuscumbia to the southeast.
