= Steamboat Bill Memorial Bridge =

Pair of bridges spanning the Tennessee River in Decatur, Alabama

Captain William J. Hudson "Steamboat Bill" Memorial Bridge
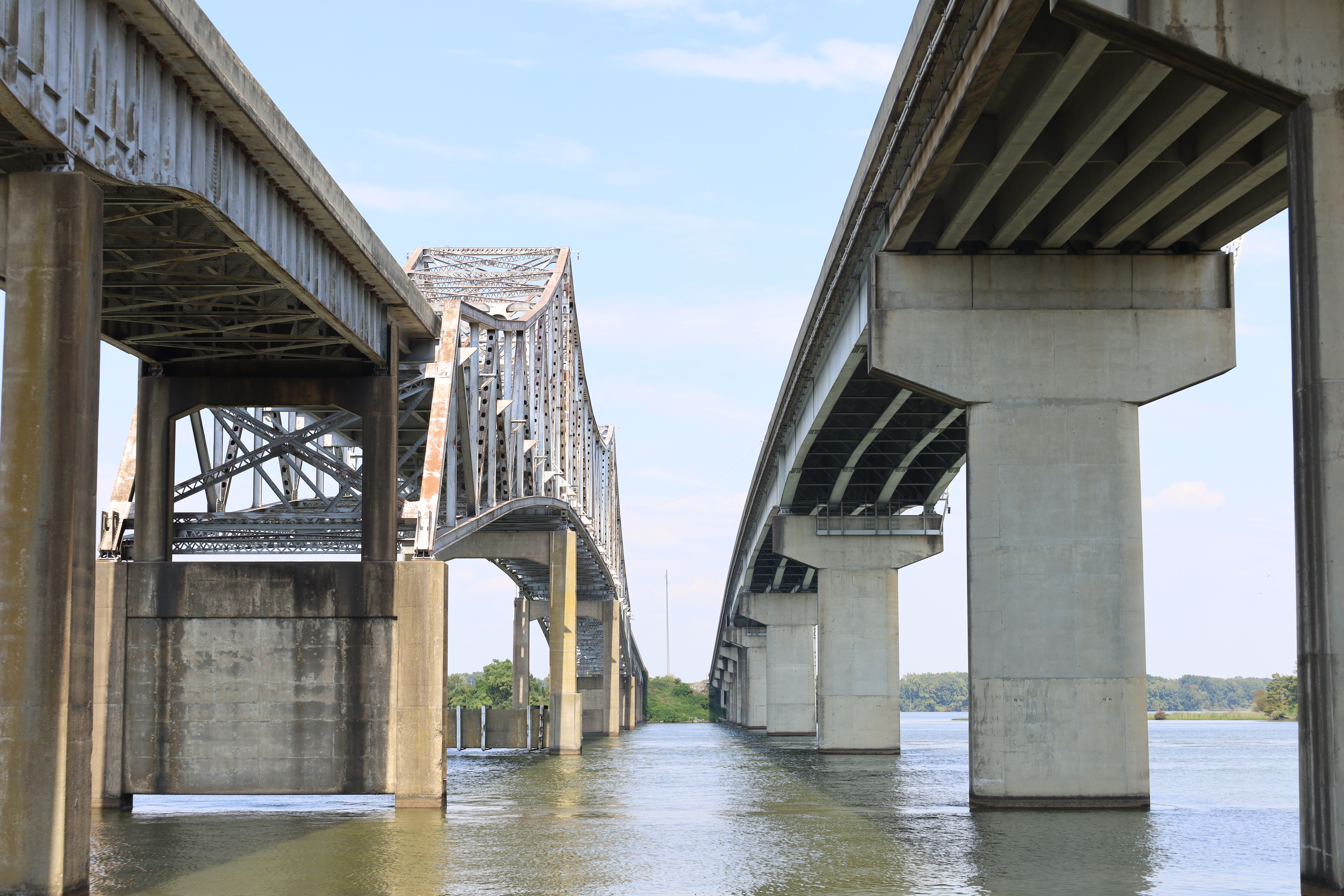
- The 1961 cantilever span and the 1999 concrete span, pictured in 2025
- Coordinates: 34°36′48″N 86°58′21″W
- Carries: US 31 / US 72 Alt. / SR 20
- Crosses: Tennessee River
- Locale: Decatur, Alabama

Location
- Interactive map of Captain William J. Hudson "Steamboat Bill" Memorial Bridge

The Captain William J. Hudson "Steamboat Bill" Memorial Bridge is a twin bridge that spans one of the widest points along the Tennessee River within the city of Decatur, Alabama, between Morgan County and Limestone County. One is a cantilever truss, and the other is a reinforced concrete. The bridges carry US 31, US 72A, and State Route 20 from the intersection of Wilson Street (US 72A, and SR 20), and 6th Avenue (US 31) in northeast Decatur.

== History ==
=== Original spans ===
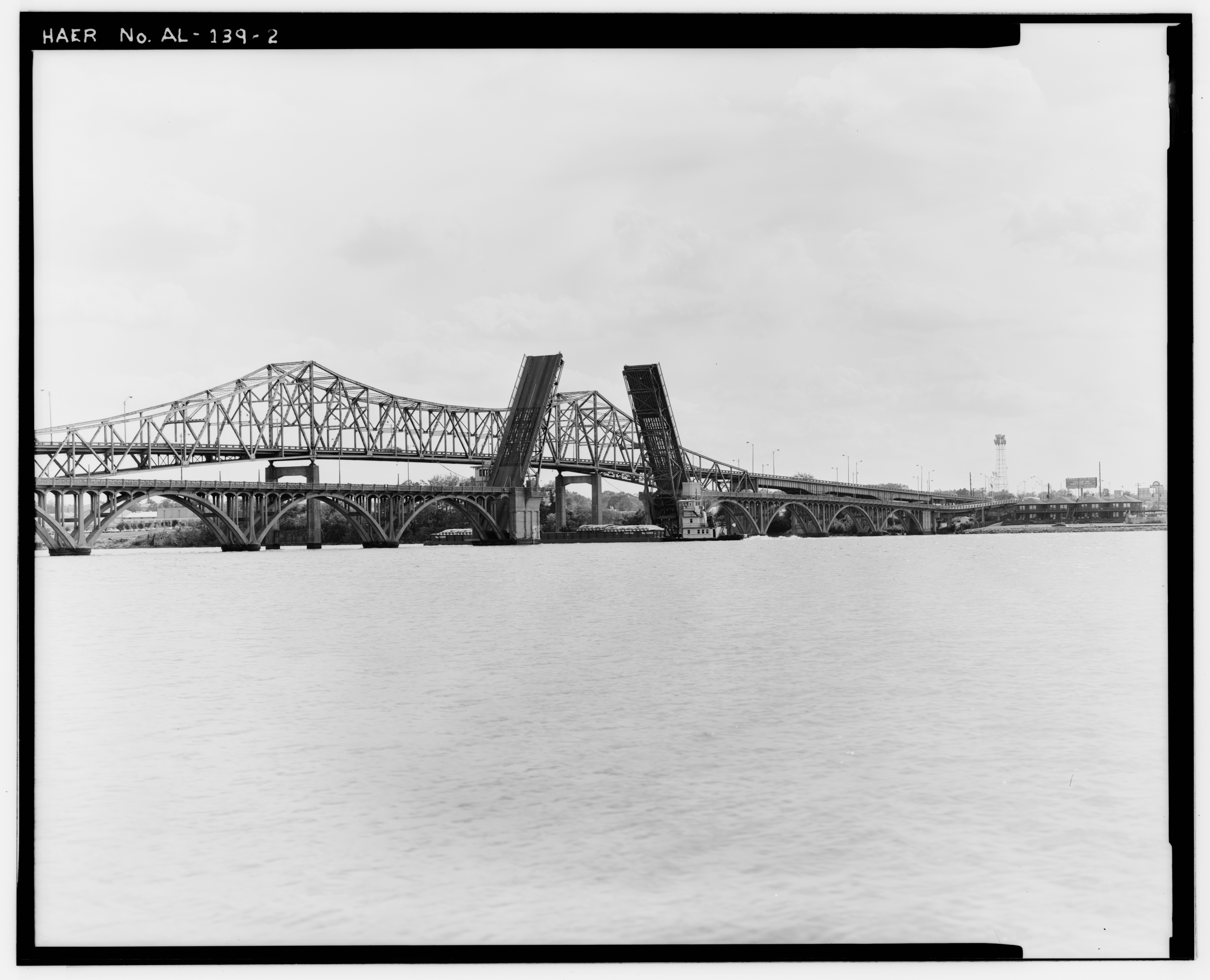
The 1926 William Keller Bridge with the 1961 bridge behind it, pictured in 1990

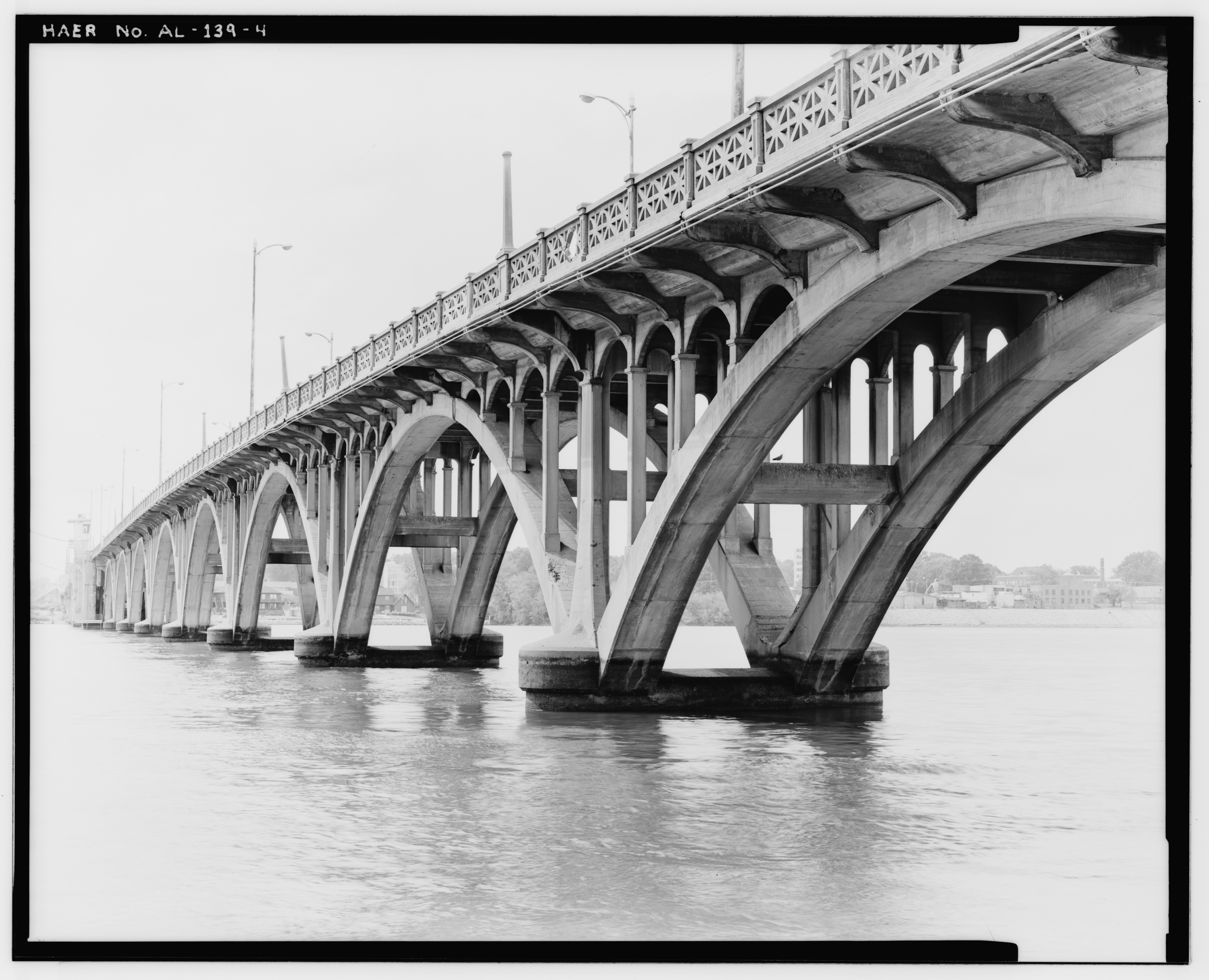
Detail of the William Keller Bridge in 1990

The first bridge built here was the William Keller Bridge, completed on February 12, 1928. This drawbridge originally served both directions.

In 1961, a new cantilever truss bridge, known as the Steamboat Bill Bridge, was built to serve as a northbound companion to the span. The Keller Bridge was then closed for extensive renovation and replacement of its old wood approaches with new concrete ones. When it reopened in 1964, it was converted to only carrying southbound traffic, and the new bridge carried the northbound traffic.

In 1987 local company Sue-Jac, Inc was awarded a $1.04 million contract for renovations to the Keller Bridge. These included replacement of drive gears, installation of electronic wiring and a new generator, and reconstruction of the bridge-tender's house.

=== Replacement span ===
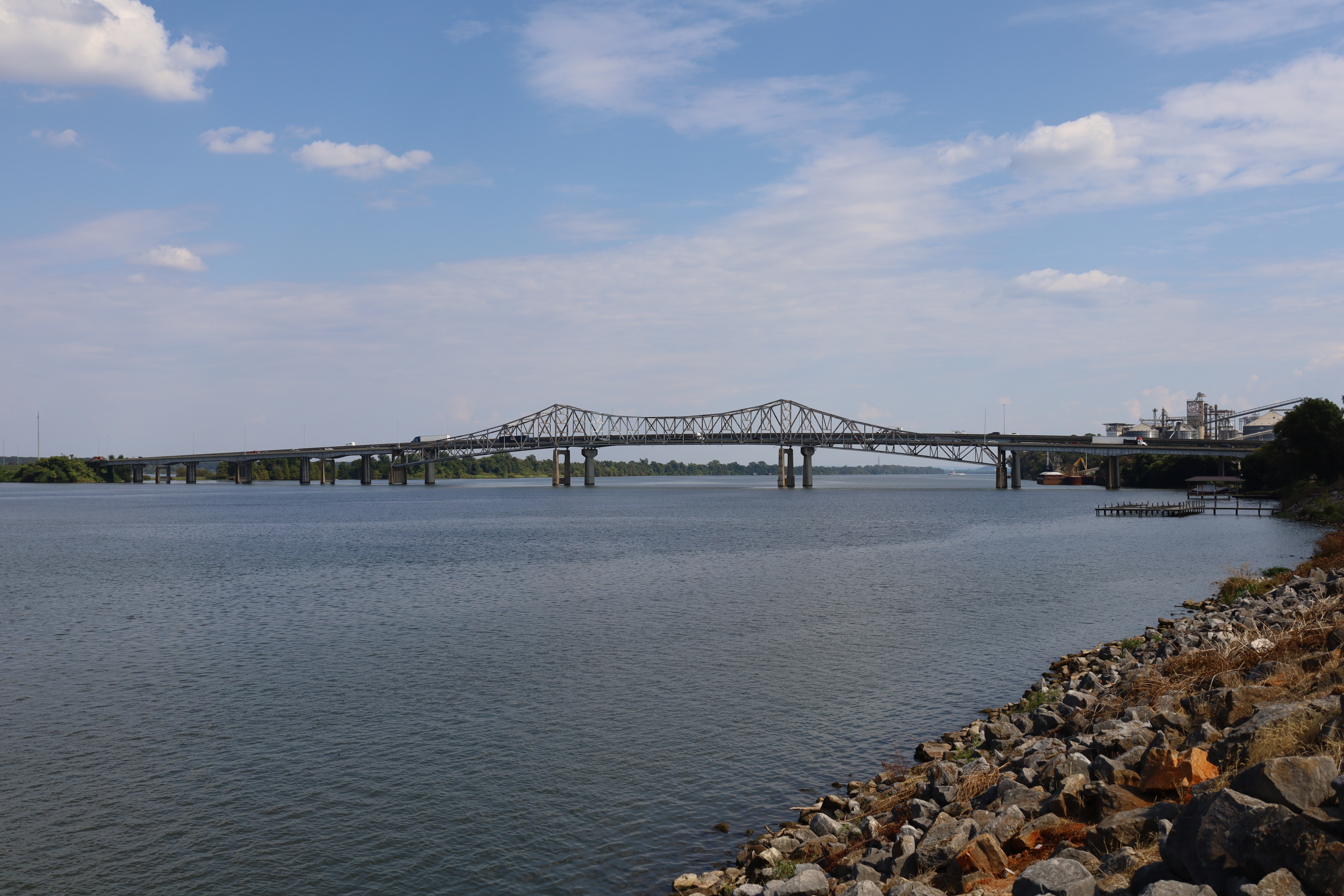
The bridge in 2025

By the late 1970s, it became apparent that the Keller Bridge was obsolete and outmoded. Additionally, the currents of the Tennessee River changed and running barges through the narrow gap created by the drawbridge became more dangerous; this resulted in the bridges being hit several times by barges. Also, with the amount of traffic carried by the road, the drawbridge could produce mile-long traffic jams.

In 1999 the new concrete bridge opened. Northbound traffic was shifted to the new bridge, southbound traffic was moved to the newly rehabilitated cantilever bridge, and the Keller Bridge was closed permanently and later demolished.

== Future ==
The city of Decatur is currently working with the Decatur Area Metropolitan Planning Organization (MPO), who themselves have teamed up with TTL, Inc., on a study to find a way to alleviate the increasing amount of traffic on the bridges. This is especially the case with the cantilever truss bridge that carries southbound traffic, since it cannot be widened and is outdated. Previously, ALDOT estimated in 2014 that a new toll bridge across the Tennessee River would cost $444 million, but local opposition caused that proposed project to be cancelled in January 2015.

Following its approval by the city council, a $2 million feasibility study began in January 2023, at which point public input was requested. Options include building a new bridge on another location and replacing the current bridge with another one. The study time period was extended to December 2023 in August. Additionally, an extension of I-565 is proposed and the routing would possibly utilize the bridge as well.

== See also ==
- List of bridges documented by the Historic American Engineering Record in Alabama
- List of crossings of the Tennessee River
