= Glen, Mississippi =

- Town
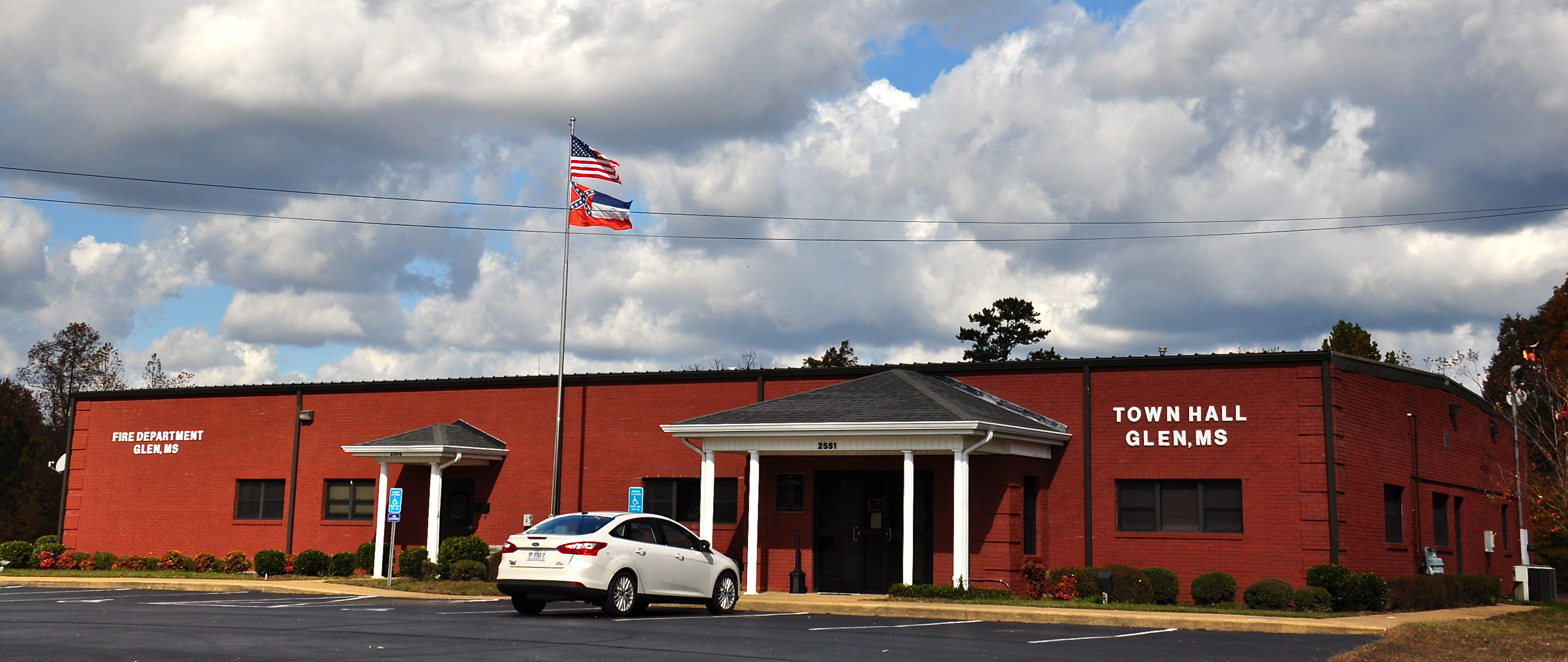
- Glen Town Hall in November 2013.

- Location of Glen, Mississippi

- Location in Mississippi Glen, Mississippi (the United States)
- Coordinates: 34°52′02″N 88°25′28″W
- Country: United States
- State: Mississippi
- County: Alcorn

Area
  - Total: 4.67 sq mi (12.09 km^{2})
  - Land: 4.66 sq mi (12.07 km^{2})
  - Water: 0.0077 sq mi (0.02 km^{2})
- Elevation: 525 ft (160 m)

Population (2020)
  - Total: 382
  - Density: 82.0/sq mi (31.65/km^{2})
- Time zone: UTC-6 (Central (CST))
  - Summer (DST): UTC-5 (CDT)
- ZIP code: 38846
- Area code: 662
- FIPS code: 28-27540
- GNIS feature ID: 2406573

Glen is a town in Alcorn County, Mississippi. The population was 382 at the 2020 census, down from 412 at the 2010 census.

== History ==
The town of Glen, located 9 miles (14 km) southeast of Corinth, owes its beginning to the Memphis & Charleston Railroad. Glen was originally called "Glendale" and is marked as such on old railroad maps.

== Geography ==
According to the United States Census Bureau, the town has a total area of 4.7 square miles (12 km^{2}), of which 4.7 square miles (12 km^{2}) is land and 0.21% is water.

== Demographics ==
Historical population
Census	Pop.	Note	%±
1990	243		—
2000	286		17.7%
2010	412		44.1%
2020	382		−7.3%
U.S. Decennial Census

As of the census of 2000, there were 286 people, 121 households, and 87 families residing in the town. The population density was 61.1 inhabitants per square mile (23.6/km^{2}). There were 133 housing units at an average density of 28.4 units per square mile (11.0 units/km^{2}). The racial makeup of the town was 99.65% White, and 0.35% from two or more races. Hispanic or Latino of any race were 0.70% of the population.

There were 121 households, out of which 28.9% had children under the age of 18 living with them, 62.8% were married couples living together, 6.6% had a female householder with no husband present, and 27.3% were non-families. 26.4% of all households were made up of individuals, and 10.7% had someone living alone who was 65 years of age or older. The average household size was 2.36 and the average family size was 2.86.

In the town, the population was spread out, with 22.4% under the age of 18, 7.3% from 18 to 24, 27.6% from 25 to 44, 25.2% from 45 to 64, and 17.5% who were 65 years of age or older. The median age was 39 years. For every 100 females, there were 115.0 males. For every 100 females age 18 and over, there were 113.5 males.

The median income for a household in the town was $26,964, and the median income for a family was $27,813. Males had a median income of $27,083 versus $21,667 for females. The per capita income for the town was $14,541. About 7.1% of families and 10.4% of the population were below the poverty line, including 12.5% of those under the age of eighteen and 15.2% of those 65 or over.

== Places of interest ==
- Kingsford Charcoal Plant

== Education ==
=== Public schools ===
The town of Glen is served by the Alcorn School District.

- Alcorn Central High School is the public high school in Glen and serves grades 9–12. The school colors are purple and gold and the mascot is a bear. Alcorn Central has about 420 students. Alcorn Central High School is at 8 Cr 254 City.

=== Sports ===
Boys sports include:

- Baseball
- Basketball
- Football
- Soccer
- Tennis

Girls sports:

- Basketball
- Soccer
- Softball
- Tennis
- Volleyball

== Transportation ==
=== Highways ===
- U.S. Route 72

== Media ==
=== FM radio stations ===
- WTRR-LP 97.1 - owned by Write to Read Radio, Inc.
