= Ave Maria Grotto =

- U.S. National Register of Historic Places
- U.S. Historic district
- Alabama Register of Landmarks and Heritage
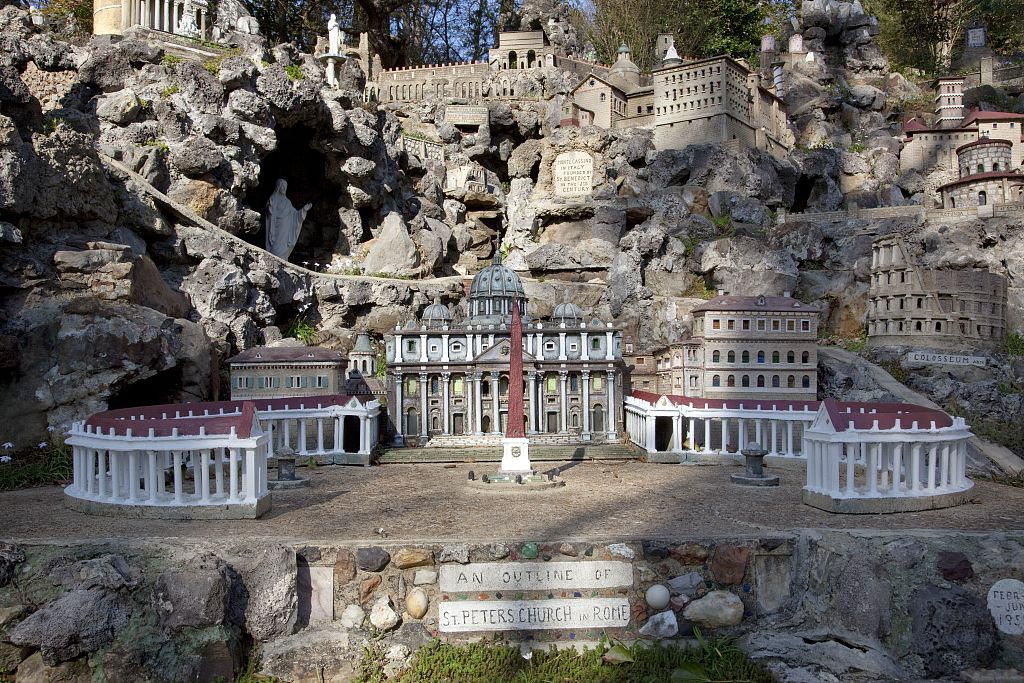
- St. Peters Church in Rome model at the Ave Maria Grotto

- Location within Alabama
- Location: St. Bernard Abbey; Cullman, Alabama
- Coordinates: 34°10′30″N 86°48′59″W
- NRHP reference No.: 84000610

Significant dates
- Added to NRHP: January 19, 1984
- Designated ARLH: February 24, 1976

Ave Maria Grotto, in Cullman, Alabama, United States, is a landscaped, 4-acre (16,000 m^{2}) park in an old quarry on the grounds of St. Bernard Abbey, providing a garden setting for 125 miniature reproductions of some of the most famous religious structures of the world. It was added to the Alabama Register of Landmarks and Heritage on February 24, 1976, and to the National Register of Historic Places on January 19, 1984.

== History ==
The stone and concrete models are the work of Brother Joseph Zoettl, a Benedictine monk of St. Bernard Abbey, who devoted some 50 years to the project, the last three decades (1932 to 1961) almost without interruption. They incorporate discarded building supplies, bricks, marbles, tiles, pipes, sea shells, plastic animals, costume jewellery, toilet bowl floats and cold cream jars.

Born in 1878 in the Kingdom of Bavaria, Brother Joseph was maimed in an accident that left him slightly hunched due to cervical kyphosis. He immigrated to the United States as a teenager, settling in northern Alabama. Soon afterward he began studying at the newly founded Benedictine monastery of St. Bernard, where he took his vows in 1897. Br. Joseph was not allowed to be ordained as a priest, due to the rule of the period that stated any man with a distracting disability could not be ordained a priest. He ran the monastery's power plant and was, even by a monk's standards, a withdrawn, quiet man. Brother Joseph rarely left Alabama, where he died in 1961.

The display is strung out along a forested trail that winds down past several building clusters built into a steep hillside. Roman Catholic cathedrals and monasteries predominate — notably St. Peter's Basilica, the Monte Cassino Abbey and the Sanctuary of Our Lady of Lourdes — along with scenes from ancient Jerusalem, whence the grotto's sobriquet, "Jerusalem in Miniature". Half of the hillside features buildings and scenes from the Holy Land. Also displayed are a number of secular buildings and the occasional pagan temple, including the Alamo Mission in San Antonio, the Leaning Tower of Pisa, Spanish missions, German castles, South African shrines, Hansel and Gretel's Temple of the Fairies, and even the St. Bernard Abbey power station, where the monk worked shoveling coal.

Near the end of the path stands an imagined Tower of Babel, recalling the vainglorious attempt of humans to build a tower to the heavens. Close to the end, a Tower of Thanks expresses Brother Joseph's gratitude for the support he received throughout the years building his sculptures.

Though executed in great detail, the scale of the edifices is often distorted, with towers and buttresses too large or small, as onsite literature acknowledges. A central artificial cave constitutes the Ave Maria Grotto proper, with pretend-stalactite-encrusted ceiling and statues of the Virgin Mary and assorted monks and nuns.

A fictionalized depiction of the Grotto serves as the backdrop for Jacob Appel's love story, Winter Honeymoon.
