= Cloverdale, Lauderdale County, Alabama =

Unincorporated community in Alabama, United States

Cloverdale, Alabama
- Unincorporated community
- Location within Alabama Location within the United States
- Coordinates: 34°56′19″N 87°46′17″W
- Country: United States
- State: Alabama
- County: Lauderdale
- Elevation: 597 ft (182 m)
- Time zone: UTC-6 (Central (CST))
  - Summer (DST): UTC-5 (CDT)
- ZIP code: 35617
- Area codes: 256 & 938
- GNIS feature ID: 116285

Cloverdale, also known as Raw Hide, is an unincorporated community in Lauderdale County, Alabama, United States. Cloverdale is located on Alabama State Route 157, 11 miles (18 km) north-northwest of Florence. Cloverdale has a post office with ZIP code 35617, which opened on April 8, 1872.

Cloverdale is bordered by Waterloo to the west, Oakland to the south, and Underwood-Petersville to the southeast.

The community was formerly known as Raw Hide and was home to a large tan yard. The name Cloverdale was adopted in 1889 for the abundance of clover in the area.
