= U.S. Route 72 Alternate =

Alternate highway route in Alabama, United States

U.S. Route 72 Alternate

Route information
- Auxiliary route of US 72
- Maintained by ALDOT
- Length: 67.526 mi (108.673 km)

Major junctions
- West end: US 43 / US 72 / SR 13 / SR 17 / SR 20 at Muscle Shoals
- SR 157 in Muscle Shoals; SR 101 in Town Creek; SR 33 in Courtland; US 31 in Decatur; I-65 / I-565 / SR 20 near Decatur; SR 255 in Huntsville; SR 53 in Huntsville; US 231 / US 431 in Huntsville
- East end: I-565 / US 72 in Huntsville

Location
- Country: United States
- State: Alabama
- Counties: Colbert, Lawrence, Morgan, Limestone, Madison

Highway system
- United States Numbered Highway System; List; Special; Divided; Alabama State Highway System; Interstate; US; State
← SR 19	SR 20	→ SR 21

Alternate U.S. Route 72 (US 72 Alt.) exists in Alabama on the south side of the Tennessee River between Muscle Shoals and Decatur, while US 72 follows on the north side of the river between Florence and Athens. US 72 Alt. crosses the Tennessee River at Decatur, along with US 31, and follows the entire route of Interstate 565 (I-565). SR 20 was co-signed with US 72 Alt. from Muscle Shoals to Huntsville but has since been truncated to the junction of I-65 just east of Decatur.

Originally, US 72 Alt. turned off SR 20 on to SR 53 / Jordan Lane in Huntsville and followed it north one mile (1.6 km) to rejoin with US 72. With the completion of I-565 in the early 1990s, US 72 Alt. was routed along with I-565 to the termination of I-565 at US 72 at Chapman Mountain.

== Route description ==
US 72 Alt. begins at an intersection with US 43/US 72 in Muscle Shoals. Here, this road continues west as part of US 72. East of there, it intersects SR 157 at an at-grade intersection, where a concurrency begins.

A couple miles east of there, the roads split. SR 157 heads straight towards Moulton. US 72 Alt. turns due east at the interchange, heading towards Town Creek and Decatur.

US 72 Alt. enters Decatur after passing through Trinity, carrying SR 20. It serves as the northern terminus for The Beltline (SR 67) and continues eastward towards the town center. After traveling by the Old State Bank and the Dancy Polk House in the downtown area, US 72 Alt. intersects US 31. It continues over the "Steamboat Bill" Hudson Memorial Bridge, after which it and SR 20 continue east towards I-65 and I-565, while US 31 continues north towards Athens and Calhoun Community College. The route is essentially unsigned east of US 31.

After the interchange at I-65, US 72 Alt. becomes concurrent with I-565. The two routes run together for the entire length of I-565, passing through Mooresville, Madison, and Huntsville passing through intersections such as the University Drive and the elevated stretch. East of Downtown Huntsville, the routes ascend Chapman Mountain, where they intersect US 72, which serves as the eastern terminus for both I-565 and US 72 Alt.

== Major intersections ==
County	Location	mi	km	Exit	Destinations	Notes
Colbert	Muscle Shoals	0.000	0.000		US 43 / US 72 (Lee Highway) / SR 20	Western terminus; western end of SR 20 overlap
Colbert		2.067	3.327		SR 133 north (Wilson Dam Road) / SR 157	Western end of SR 157 overlap
Colbert		4.386	7.059		SR 157 south (University of North Alabama Highway)	Eastern end of SR 157 overlap
Lawrence	Town Creek	15.300	24.623		SR 101 (Wheeler Dam Highway) – Wheeler Dam	
Lawrence	Courtland	22.806	36.703		SR 33 south (Wilderness Parkway)	
Morgan	Decatur	37.497	60.346		State Docks Road (SR 67)	
Morgan	Decatur	37.977	61.118		SR 67 (Beltline Road)	
Morgan	Decatur	41.344	66.537		US 31 south (6th Avenue)	Western end of US 31 overlap
Morgan	Tennessee River	41.681	67.079	Captain William J. Hudson "Steamboat Bill" Memorial Bridges		
Limestone	Decatur	43.327	69.728		US 31 north	Interchange; eastern end of US 31 overlap; US 72 Alt. becomes unsigned
Limestone	Decatur				Mitchell Road	Interchange opened in 2023
Limestone	Decatur–Huntsville city line	52.175	83.968	1	I-65 / I-565 begins / SR 20 ends – Birmingham, Nashville	Western end of I-565 overlap; western terminus of I-565; signed as exits 1A (south) and 1B (north) eastbound; I-65 exit 340 northbound & 340A-B southbound
Limestone	Huntsville			2	Mooresville Road	
Limestone	Huntsville	55.652	89.563	3	Greenbrier Road	Will be reconfigured into a partial cloverleaf interchange
Limestone–Madison county line	Huntsville			7	Madison Boulevard, County Line Road	Former SR 20 east
Madison	Huntsville			8	Huntsville International Airport	
Madison	Madison			9	Wall-Triana Highway, Madison Boulevard	
Madison	Madison	10.56	16.99	10	Town Madison Boulevard	Eastbound entrance and exit completed; westbound entrance and exit under construction and widening of I-565 to accommodate the westbound ramp; possible extension to Huntsville-Decatur Highway planned
Madison	Huntsville	65.234	104.984	13	Madison Boulevard	Westbound exit and eastbound entrance; former SR 20 west; to be rebuilt into a full interchange for improved access to Redstone Arsenal via new Resolute Way roadway
Madison	Huntsville			14	SR 255 north (Research Park Boulevard) – Redstone Arsenal Gate 9	Signed as exits 14A (Gate 9) and 14B (SR 255) westbound
Madison	Huntsville			15	Madison Pike, Sparkman Drive, Bob Wallace Avenue	Entrance to U.S. Space and Rocket Center
Madison	Huntsville	69.190	111.351	17A	SR 53 north (Jordan Lane) to US 72	Signed as exit 17 westbound
Madison	Huntsville	69.556	111.940	17B	SR 53 south (Governors Drive)	Eastbound exit and westbound entrance
Madison	Huntsville			19A	US 231 / US 431 (Memorial Parkway / SR 1)	Eastbound exit and westbound entrance; signed as exits 19A (south) and 19B (north)
Madison	Huntsville			19B	US 231 / US 431 (Memorial Parkway / SR 1) / Pratt Avenue west / Washington Street north	Westbound exit and eastbound entrance; eastern terminus of Pratt Avenue; southern terminus of Washington Street
Madison	Huntsville			19C	Washington Street / Jefferson Street – Downtown	Signed as exit 19A westbound
Madison	Huntsville			20	Oakwood Avenue / Andrew Jackson Way	
Madison	Huntsville	73.863	118.871	21	US 72 west (SR 2 west) / Maysville Road – Athens	
Madison	Huntsville	73.863	118.871		I-565 ends / US 72 east (SR 2 east)	Eastern terminus; eastbound exit and westbound entrance; eastern end of US 72 Alt. concurrency; eastern terminus of US 72 Alt.
1.000 mi = 1.609 km; 1.000 km = 0.621 mi: Concurrency terminus; Incomplete access; Unopened
