= Cox Creek (Alabama) =

River in Alabama, United States

Physical characteristics
- Source
  - coordinates: 34°51′22″N 87°38′54″W
- Mouth
  - location: Cypress Creek
  - coordinates: 34°49′42″N 87°42′6″W

Cox Creek is a stream in Lauderdale County, in the U.S. state of Alabama, that flows through the northern portions of the city of Florence.

Cox Creek was probably named for Zachariah Cox, a land agent.

== See also ==
- List of rivers of Alabama
