= Greenbrier, Alabama =

Unincorporated community in Alabama, United States

- Unincorporated community
- Location within Alabama Location within the United States
- Coordinates: 34°40′15″N 86°50′37″W
- Country: United States
- State: Alabama
- County: Limestone
- Established: 1829, First inhabited
- Elevation: 610 ft (186 m)

Population (2020 (Estimated))
  - Unincorporated community: 30
  - Metro: 462,693 (Huntsville Metropolitan Area)
- Time zone: UTC-6 (Central (CST))
  - Summer (DST): UTC-5 (CDT)
- ZIP code: 35758
- Area code: 256
- GNIS feature ID: 119357

Greenbrier is an unincorporated community in south eastern Limestone County, Alabama, United States. The population is 30 as of 2020. It is located 5.5 kilometers from the Madison County and Limestone County borders.

== History ==
Greenbrier was likely named for Greenbrier, Virginia, since a number of early settlers of the area came from Virginia. A post office was established under the name Green Brier in 1869 and was in operation until 1920. There is a small restaurant located in the north of the community where it is decorated with a mural around the outside perimeters of the building that is open and listed as a landmark.

The community of Greenbrier is located 3.4 miles (5.5km) from the Limestone Madison county borders. The community also is located in between the City of Madison and the City of Athens. South of the community is a railline owned by Norfolk Southern, there is no station in Greenbrier, but there are rail lines leading to the Toyota Mazda plant where car parts will be unloaded and reloaded.

In 2020, a Toyota-Mazda manufacturing plant opened north of Greenbrier, and the road parallel to the plant was extended to 4 lanes.
