= Hatton, Lawrence County, Alabama =

Hatton, Alabama
- Census-designated place
- Location within Alabama Location within the United States
- Coordinates: 34°33′46″N 87°24′55″W
- Country: United States
- State: Alabama
- County: Lawrence

Area
  - Total: 1.34 sq mi (3.47 km^{2})
  - Land: 1.33 sq mi (3.45 km^{2})
  - Water: 0.0077 sq mi (0.02 km^{2})
- Elevation: 699 ft (213 m)

Population (2020)
  - Total: 244
  - Density: 183.0/sq mi (70.66/km^{2})
- Time zone: UTC-6 (Central (CST))
  - Summer (DST): UTC-5 (CDT)
- Area codes: 256 & 938
- GNIS feature ID: 2628593

Hatton is a census-designated place and unincorporated community in Lawrence County, Alabama, United States. Its population was 261 as of the 2010 census.

== Education ==
Hatton, AL, is served by Hatton Elementary school, which includes Kindergarten through 6th Grade, and Hatton High School, which includes Grades 7–12. Both schools are part of the Lawrence County School System. The elementary school serves 472 students and the high school serves 422 students. The high school is classified as a 4A School by the Alabama High School Athletic Association. As of 2024–25, the Hatton Hornet Athletic Program has won 22 State Championships; 3 in slow-pitch softball (1992, 1993, 1996), 6 in fast-pitch softball (2010, 2011, 2012, 2013, 2017, 2023), 4 in women's volleyball (1990, 1991, 1992, 1993), 2 in women's basketball (2002, 2004), 1 in men's basketball (1964), and 6 in men's cross country (2003, 2008, 2009, 2010, 2012, 2020). Additionally, the school has finished state runners-up on many occasions.

== Demographics ==
Historical population
Census	Pop.	Note	%±
2010	261		—
2020	244		−6.5%
U.S. Decennial Census

Hatton was listed as a census designated place in the 2010 U.S. census.

Hatton CDP, Alabama – Racial and ethnic composition Note: the US Census treats Hispanic/Latino as an ethnic category. This table excludes Latinos from the racial categories and assigns them to a separate category. Hispanics/Latinos may be of any race.
Race / Ethnicity (NH = Non-Hispanic)	Pop 2010	Pop 2020	% 2010	% 2020
White alone (NH)	234	189	89.66%	77.46%
Black or African American alone (NH)	0	0	0.00%	0.00%
Native American or Alaska Native alone (NH)	19	16	7.28%	6.56%
Asian alone (NH)	0	0	0.00%	0.00%
Native Hawaiian or Pacific Islander alone (NH)	0	0	0.00%	0.00%
Other race alone (NH)	0	0	0.00%	0.00%
Mixed race or Multiracial (NH)	8	35	3.07%	14.34%
Hispanic or Latino (any race)	0	4	0.00%	1.64%
Total	261	244	100.00%	100.00%
