= Joe Wheeler State Park =

State park in Lauderdale and Lawrence counties, Alabama, United States

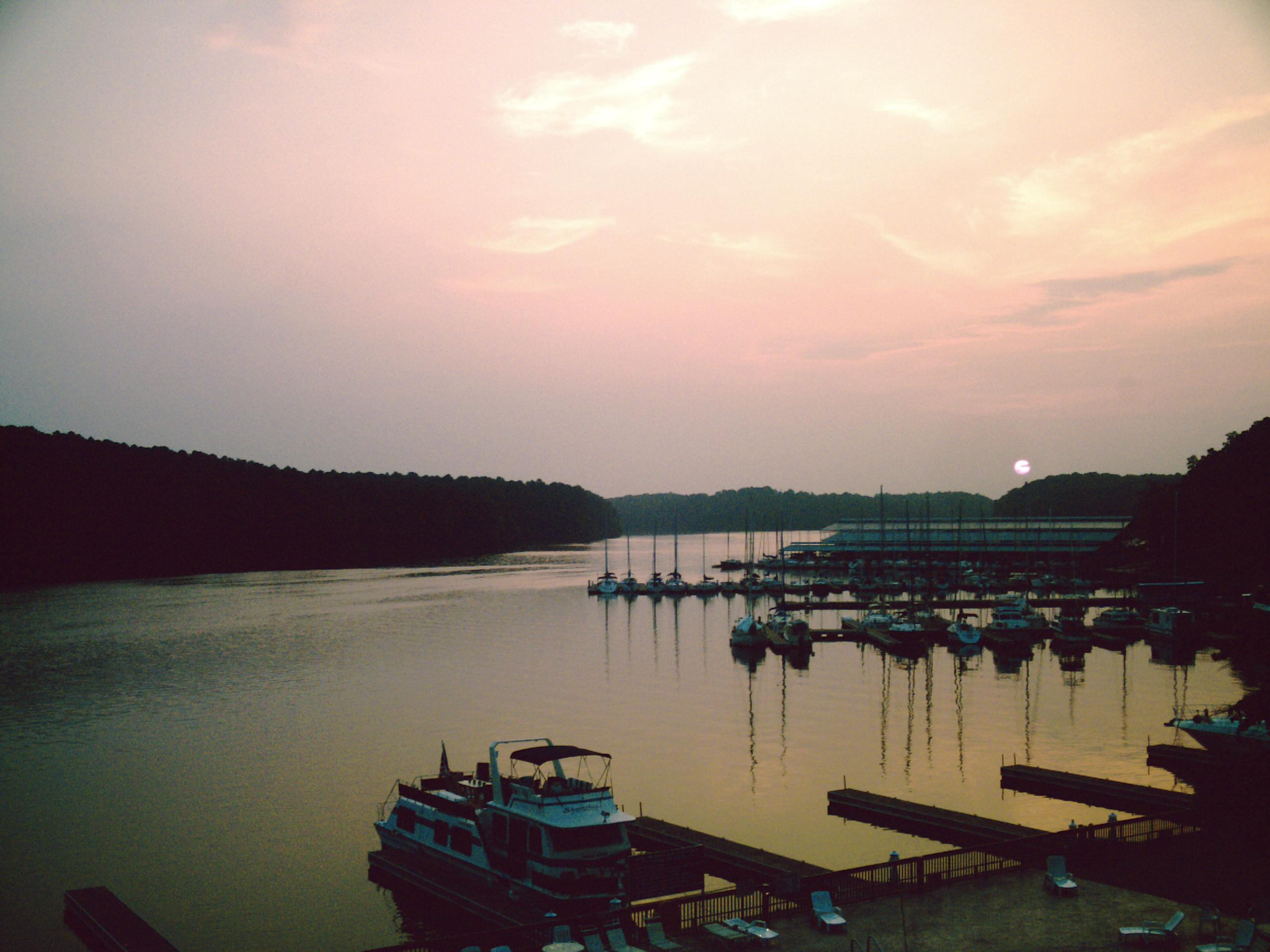

- Location within Alabama
- Location: Lauderdale and Lawrence counties, Alabama, United States
- Coordinates: 34°47′36″N 87°22′41″W
- Area: 2,550 acres (1,030 ha)
- Elevation: 600 ft (180 m)
- Established: 1949
- Administrator: Alabama Department of Conservation and Natural Resources
- Website: Official website

Joe Wheeler State Park is a public recreation area with resort features located on Wheeler Lake, an impoundment of the Tennessee River, 18 miles (29 km) east of Florence in northwest Alabama. The state park contains 2,550 acres (1,030 ha) of land in three separate parcels and adjoins Wheeler Dam.

== History ==
The park was established when the state purchased land from the Tennessee Valley Authority (TVA) in 1949. Resort features were added during a major upgrade begun in 1973. The park, the lake and dam are named after the Confederate general and U.S. Congressman Joseph Wheeler.

== Awards ==
In September 2020, Joe Wheeler State Park was one of eleven Alabama state parks awarded Tripadvisor’s Traveler’s Choice Award, which recognizes businesses and attractions that earn consistently high user reviews.

== Activities and amenities ==
The Rogersville area of the park includes a resort lodge, convention facilities, restaurant, campground, 140-slip marina, 18-hole golf course, and 2.5-mile (4.0 km) loop trail for hiking and biking. The TVA maintains a dam overlook near the state park's cabin area.
