= Northwest Alabama Regional Airport =

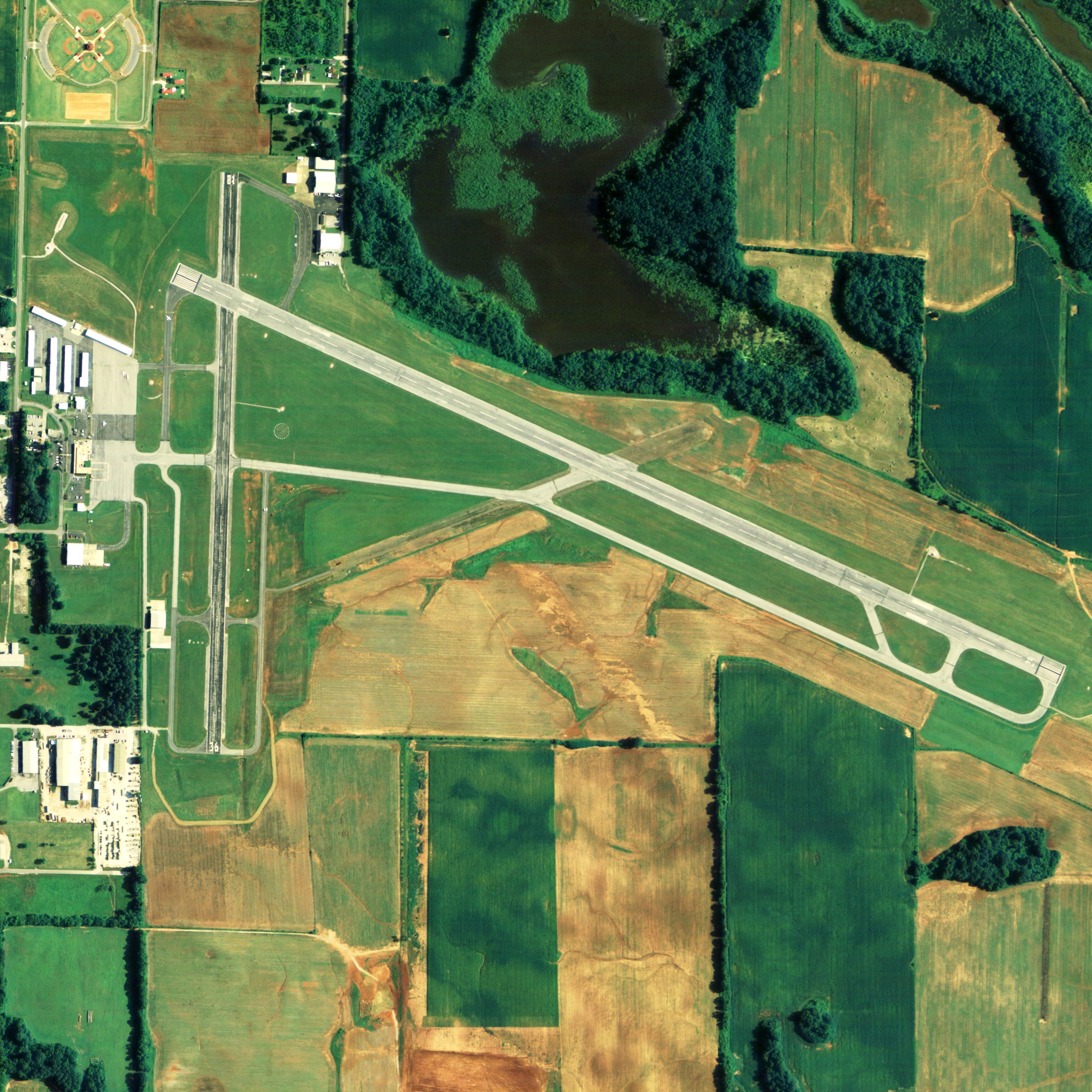
- NAIP image, 2006
- IATA: MSL; ICAO: KMSL; FAA LID: MSL

Summary
- Airport type: Public
- Owner: Colbert & Lauderdale Counties
- Serves: Florence, Alabama & Muscle Shoals, Alabama
- Elevation AMSL: 551 ft (168 m)
- Coordinates: 34°44′43″N 087°36′37″W
- Website: www.FlyTheShoals.com

Map
- Location within Alabama Location within the United States

Runways
Direction	Length		Surface
Direction	ft	m	Surface
12/30	6,694	2,040	Asphalt
18/36	4,000	1,219	Asphalt

Statistics
- Aircraft operations (2021): 36,805
- Based aircraft (2021): 60
- Source: Federal Aviation Administration

Northwest Alabama Regional Airport (IATA: MSL, ICAO: KMSL, FAA LID: MSL) is a public-use airport, located one mile east of Muscle Shoals, in Colbert County, Alabama. It is owned by the counties of Colbert and Lauderdale. The airport is serviced by Contour Airlines, and subsidized by the Essential Air Service program. Formerly, the airport operated as Muscle Shoals Auxiliary Field.

== History ==
=== Military ===
The airport opened as Muscle Shoals Auxiliary Field in February 1940, but in 1942 it was taken over by the United States Army Air Forces, as a World War II pilot training military airfield. It was assigned to the AAF Flying Training Command, Southeast Training Center (later Eastern Flying Training Command) as a basic (stage 2) pilot training airfield. Pilot training at the airfield apparently ended on May 30, 1944, with the drawdown of AAFTC's pilot training program. The airfield was returned to civil control at the end of the war.

=== Recent ===
Former airport logo

Until summer 2009 Muscle Shoals was served from Northwest Airlines' hub in Memphis by Northwest Airlink (Mesaba Airlines turboprops). After Northwest was acquired by Delta Air Lines, service was transferred to Delta's hub in Atlanta. This has seen increased passenger numbers and less market leakage to nearby Huntsville Airport. Despite the increase in enplanements, on November 23, 2010, Delta announced that it would not re-apply for the Essential Air Service subsidy to provide service between Muscle Shoals and Memphis. The cited reason was the retirement of partner Mesaba's Saab 340 fleet. Under federal law, Delta Connection must continue service to Muscle Shoals until a replacement carrier is found. In 2011, Air Choice One, a Missouri-based carrier, submitted a proposal to the US DOT to serve Muscle Shoals with flights to either Atlanta, Nashville or Memphis. Pending acceptance of the proposal, the airline was planning to begin flights in as little as 30 days. This airline never commenced service to Muscle Shoals.

Eastern Airlines stopped at Muscle Shoals from 1947 to 1964. Southern Airways Douglas DC-9s flew nonstop to Atlanta and via Huntsville, and Southern Martin 4-0-4s flew to Memphis. Southern merged with North Central to form Republic, which continued at Muscle Shoals with DC-9-50s to Atlanta and with Convair 580s and Metroliners to Memphis. Republic was acquired by Northwest Airlines which ended jet flights to Atlanta but started Northwest Airlink service to Memphis with Jetstream 31s. Northwest Airlink replaced the Jetstreams with larger Saab 340s before all service ended.

Beginning in October 2012, Muscle Shoals was served by Silver Airways with two daily flights to Atlanta. Due to constant delays and cancellations, ridership declined to about 3 passengers per day under Silver, below EAS guidelines. Silver ended service to Muscle Shoals in October 2014. SeaPort Airlines announced it would take Silver's place in the Fall of 2014, and began daily flights to Nashville and Memphis on January 12, 2015. SeaPort service lasted less than one year and ended on October 20, 2015. The US Department of Transportation awarded the EAS contract to Boutique Air in 2016. Boutique Air provided four round trips to Atlanta every day utilizing an 8-seat Pilatus PC-12. However, this service has since been replaced by Contour Airlines' flights to Charlotte, North Carolina.

== Facilities ==
The airport covers 640 acres (259 ha) at an elevation of 551 feet (168 m). It has two asphalt runways: 12/30 is 6,694 by 150 feet (2,040 x 46 m) and 18/36 is 4,000 by 100 feet (1,219 x 30 m).

In the year ending May 31, 2021, the airport had 36,805 aircraft operations, averaging 101 per day: 88% general aviation, 7% airline, 1% air taxi and 4% military. In November 2021, there were 60 aircraft based at this airport: 40 single-engine, 10 multi-engine, 1 jet and 9 helicopter.

== Airline and destinations ==
Airlines	Destinations	Refs.
Contour Airlines	Charlotte; Seasonal: Pensacola	

=== Top destinations ===
Busiest domestic routes from MSL (September 2025 – August 2026)
Rank	Airport	Passengers	Carriers
1	Charlotte, North Carolina	8,290	Contour
2	Pensacola, Florida	410	Contour

== See also ==
- List of airports in Alabama
- Southern Airways Flight 242
