= Huntsville–Decatur–Albertville combined statistical area =

Greater Huntsville
- Combined statistical area
- Huntsville–Decatur–Albertville, AL combined statistical area
- U.S. Space & Rocket Center in Huntsville
Map of Huntsville–Decatur–Albertville, AL–TN CSA
Huntsville metropolitan area
Decatur metropolitan area
Albertville micropolitan area
Fort Payne micropolitan area
Fayetteville micropolitan area
City of Huntsville
City of Decatur
- Coordinates: 34.650°N 86.787°W
- Country: United States
- State: Alabama; Tennessee
- Metro areas: Huntsville Metropolitan Area; Decatur Metropolitan Area; Albertville Micropolitan Area; Fort Payne Micropolitan Area; Fayetteville Micropolitan Area
- Core cities: Huntsville; Decatur; Albertville
- Constituent counties: DeKalb, Lawrence, Limestone, Lincoln, Madison, Marshall, Morgan

Area
  - Total: 4,710 sq mi (12,200 km^{2})
  - Land: 4,545 sq mi (11,770 km^{2})
  - Water: 164 sq mi (420 km^{2})

Population
  - Total: 852,756
- Time zone: UTC-6 (CST)
  - Summer (DST): UTC-5 (CDT)

The Huntsville–Decatur–Albertville combined statistical area is the most populated sub-region of North Alabama, and is the second largest combined statistical area in the U.S. state of Alabama, after Birmingham–Cullman–Talladega. The Huntsville–Decatur–Albertville, AL–TN CSA had an estimated population of 931,245 in 2025, ranking 67th in the country.

The CSA is situated along the Tennessee River, and is made up of two separate metropolitan areas (Decatur and Huntsville) and 3 micropolitan areas (Albertville, Fort Payne, and Fayetteville). The Decatur MSA, Albertville μSA, and Fort Payne μSA are south of the Tennessee River and the Huntsville MSA and Fayetteville μSA are north of it.

Significant cities included in the CSA include Albertville, Arab, Athens, Boaz, Decatur, Fayetteville, Fort Payne, Guntersville, Hartselle, Huntsville, and Madison, as well as DeKalb, Lawrence, Limestone, Lincoln, Madison, Marshall, and Morgan counties.

As of 2025, Huntsville is the largest city in the CSA with an estimated population of 233,627, and a metro population of 556,444. Madison is the second largest city with a population of 67,968 people; Decatur is the principal city of the second largest metro in the CSA, with a city population of 58,056 and a metro population of 160,326. Mooresville is the smallest town in the CSA with a population of 47.

== Counties ==
- DeKalb
- Lawrence
- Limestone
- Lincoln
- Madison
- Marshall
- Morgan

== Components ==
Statistical Area	2025 estimate	2020 Census	Change	Area	Density
Huntsville, AL Metropolitan Statistical Area	556,444	491,723	+13.16%	1,420 sq mi (3,700 km^{2})	392/sq mi (151/km^{2})
Decatur, AL Metropolitan Statistical Area	160,326	156,494	+2.45%	1,316 sq mi (3,410 km^{2})	122/sq mi (47/km^{2})
Albertville, AL Micropolitan Statistical Area	103,537	97,612	+6.07%	623 sq mi (1,610 km^{2})	166/sq mi (64/km^{2})
Fort Payne, AL Micropolitan Statistical Area	74,085	71,608	+3.46%	779 sq mi (2,020 km^{2})	95/sq mi (37/km^{2})
Fayetteville, TN Micropolitan Statistical Area	36,853	35,319	+4.34%	571 sq mi (1,480 km^{2})	65/sq mi (25/km^{2})
Total	931,245	852,756	+9.20%	4,709 sq mi (12,200 km^{2})	198/sq mi (76/km^{2})

== Cities ==
All places listed have their populations listed from the 2020 US Census data. All unincorporated places do not have their population data recorded unless it is a CDP.

=== Core cities ===
- Huntsville (215,006)
- Decatur (57,938)
- Albertville (22,386)

=== Cities with more than 50,000 inhabitants ===
- Madison (56,933)

=== Cities with 10,000–30,000 inhabitants ===
- Athens (25,406)
- Boaz (10,107)
- Fort Payne (14,877)
- Hartselle (15,455)

=== Cities and communities with 5,000–9,999 inhabitants ===
- Arab (8,461)
- Fayetteville (7,068)
- Guntersville (8,553)
- Rainsville (5,505)

=== Cities, and towns with more than 2,000–4,999 inhabitants ===
- Collinsville (2,059)
- Henager (2,292)
- Moulton (3,398)
- New Hope (2,889)
- Owens Cross Roads (2,594)
- Priceville (3,513)
- Triana (2,890)
- Trinity (2,526)

=== Cities and towns with less than 2,000 inhabitants ===
- Ardmore, Alabama (1,321)
- Ardmore, Tennessee (1,217)
- Courtland (583)
- Crossville (1,830)
- Douglas (761)
- Elkmont (411)
- Eva (589)
- Falkville (1,197)
- Fyffe (967)
- Geraldine (910)
- Grant (1,039)
- Gurley (816)
- Hammondville (425)
- Hillsboro (407)
- Ider (735)
- Lakeview (161)
- Lester (111)
- Mentone (319)
- Mooresville (47)
- North Courtland (483)
- Petersburg (528)
- Pine Ridge (263)
- Powell (901)
- Shiloh (321)
- Sylvania (1,790)
- Somerville (796)
- Taft (256)
- Union Grove (67)
- Valley Head (577)

=== Unincorporated places ===
- Basham
- Belle Mina
- Big Cove
- Blanche
- Brooksville
- Brownsboro
- Burningtree Mountain
- Caddo
- Capshaw
- Chalybeate Springs
- Chase
- Coxey
- Danville
- Dellrose
- Flintville
- Good Springs
- Greenbrier
- Harvest
- Hazel Green
- Hobbs Island
- Holland Gin
- Hulaco
- Joppa
- Lacey's Spring
- Landersville
- Loosier
- Massey
- Maysville
- Meridianville
- Monrovia
- Moontown
- Moores Mill
- Morgan City
- Moulton Heights
- Mount Hope
- Muck City
- Neel
- New Market
- Oakville
- Oakland (near Athens)
- Oakland (near Madison)
- Park City
- Pence
- Pettusville
- Plevna
- Pittsburg
- Rainbow Mountain
- Redstone Arsenal
- Ryan Crossroads
- Ryland
- Scarce Grease
- Six Mile
- Six Way
- Speake
- Thach
- Tanner
- Toney
- Union Hill
- Valhermoso Springs
- Veto
- Wheeler
- Wolf Springs
- Woodland Mills
- Wren
- Youngtown

== Education ==
=== K–12 education ===
School systems by county:

Madison

- Huntsville City Schools
- Madison County Schools
- Madison City Schools

Limestone

- Athens City Schools
- Limestone County Schools

Morgan

- Decatur City Schools
- Hartselle City Schools
- Morgan County Schools

Lawrence

- Lawrence County Schools

=== Institutions of higher education ===
- University of Alabama in Huntsville
- Alabama A&M University
- Athens State University
- Calhoun Community College System
  - Calhoun Decatur Campus
  - Calhoun Redstone Arsenal Campus
  - Calhoun Huntsville/Cummings Research Park Campus
- Faulkner University
- Georgia Institute of Technology's two sites Huntsville
- Huntsville Regional Medical Campus of the University of Alabama at Birmingham School of Medicine
- Oakwood University
- Embry-Riddle Aeronautical University.
- Florida Institute of Technology

== Geography ==
The geography of the Huntsville–Decatur Metro Area ranges from the tall peaks of the southern Appalachian Mountains, to the low valleys formed by the Tennessee River. Decatur sits on the southern shore of the Tennessee River, while Huntsville lies about 10 miles from the Tennessee River, and sits at the base of Monte Sano Mountain.

- Tennessee Valley
- Wheeler National Wildlife Refuge
- Monte Sano State Park
- Joe Wheeler State Park

== Infrastructure ==
=== Roadways ===
The heart of the Huntsville–Decatur Metro Area (Huntsville, Decatur, and Madison) is linked together by the 22 mile strip of Interstate 565.

Interstate 565 begins at the eastern edge of the Decatur city limits near the interchange with Interstate 65. At the interchange, Alternate US 72 and State Route 20 become a controlled access highway as it passes under Interstate 65 receiving traffic from the north – (Nashville), and south – (Birmingham / Decatur / Hartselle) in addition to the nearly 40,000–51,000 vehicles per day from Decatur to Huntsville on the Alternate US 72 Corridor.

Plans are underway to extend Interstate 565 from the Interstate 65/Alternate US 72/State Route 20 interchange to the US 31/State Route 20/Alternate US 72 interchange in the Limestone County portion of Decatur. Eventually the extended Interstate Highway will cross the Tennessee River's Wheeler Lake intersecting the once proposed Memphis to Atlanta Highway..

==== Huntsville/Madison roadways ====
As Interstate 565 passes the northern portion of the Wheeler National Wildlife Refuge, Madison Boulevard (formerly State Route 20) branches off of the interstate leading into Madison. Beyond Madison Boulevard's convergence with Interstate 565 nine miles beyond, Research Park Boulevard, an important north–south expressway connecting Cummings Research Park, MidCity (a mixed used development at the location of the former Madison Square Mall), and Redstone Arsenal, bypasses the portions of Huntsville's busier Memorial Parkway.

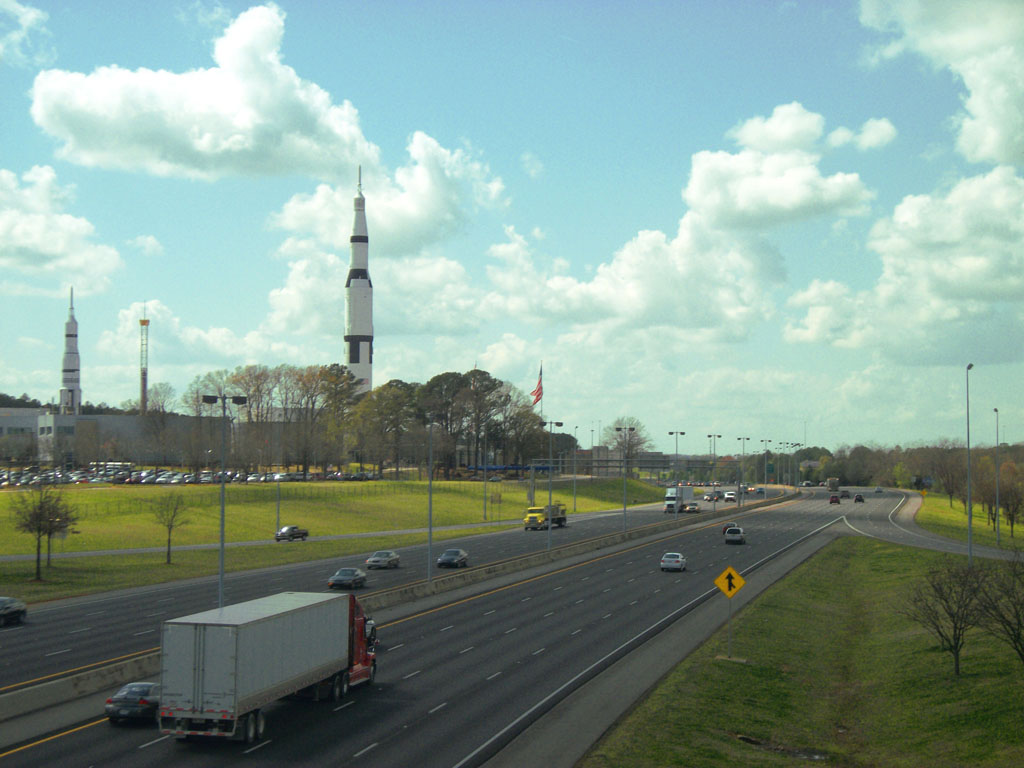
I-565 passing by the U.S. Space & Rocket Center

Interstate 565 winds past the US Space and Rocket Center and approaches downtown as an elevated freeway. About a .5 miles (0.80 km) after the elevated portion of the interstate begins is the largest interchange in Huntsville. The I-565/Memorial Parkway interchange carries over 150,000 vehicles a day. Memorial Parkway stretches from the Tennessee River to Normal. The Parkway feeds the 7-lane University Drive, also known as US 72. Also intersecting the Parkway is the 5-lane Governors Drive (US 431) that serves southeast Huntsville, Hampton Cove, and Huntsville Hospital. Interstate 565 ascends Chapman Mountain, and descends the other side towards Gurley as US 72.

==== Decatur roadways ====
Decatur's main roadways are 6th Avenue – (U.S. Route 31), and Beltline Road – State Route 67.

6th Avenue, part of U.S. Route 31, begins as both State Route 20/Alternate US 72, and US 31 are carved out of the "Steamboat Bill" Hudson Memorial Bridge that crosses the Tennessee River at the north central part of town. AL 20/Alt US 72 continues west towards The Shoals, after The Beltline begins in the vicinity of the Solutia plant. After the Tennessee River bridges 6th Avenue continues southward where it eventually intersects with The Beltline. After that intersection, 6th Avenue continues southward now under the name of Decatur Highway towards Hartselle and Birmingham.

The Beltline was built as a western bypass to reduce congestion on 6th Avenue. The area around the Beltline experienced rapid growth, causing additional traffic problems. The city's approach to this was to widen the road to six lanes, which was to be completed by 2010.

== Economy ==
The economy of the Huntsville–Decatur Area has significant technical, aerospace, manufacturing, and defensive components. Huntsville is also home to the second largest research park in the country, Cummings Research Park.

The Huntsville–Decatur Metro Area is the second fastest growing region/metro area in the state of Alabama because of the ample job opportunities being instilled in the area. Both ports in the metro area are two of the busiest in the state. Huntsville International Airport is the second busiest in Alabama, and still growing, trailing Birmingham International Airport in Birmingham. The Port of Decatur, along the Tennessee River, has grown to be the largest/busiest along the Tennessee River.

=== Tennessee Valley Authority ===
The Tennessee Valley Authority (TVA) was established by President Franklin D. Roosevelt's New Deal plan, creating numerous dams, locks, nuclear power plants, coal power plants, along with many others, to create jobs along one of the most poverty ridden regions in the United States. The TVA has turned many tired North Alabama towns into some of the most technologically advanced cities in the country. A high quality of living, has helped to fuel the Huntsville and Decatur area's explosion into the aerospace, bio-technical, and other research market areas of the U.S.

The Tennessee Valley Authority has grown to be the largest public utility provider in the United States.

==== TVA links ====
- TVA home page
- WPA Photographs of TVA Archaeological Projects

=== Major employers ===
- ADTRAN
- Athens Limestone Hospital – Athens/Limestone County
- Boeing – Decatur/Huntsville
- United Launch Alliance – Decatur
- Calhoun Community College System – Decatur/Huntsville
- Cinram – Huntsville
- Cummings Research Park
- Decatur General Hospital system – Decatur
- Huntsville Hospital System – Huntsville
- Intergraph – Madison
- Marshall Space Flight Center – Huntsville/Madison County
- Meow Mix – Decatur
- Nucor Corporation – Decatur
- Parkway Medical Center – Decatur
- Redstone Arsenal – Huntsville/Madison County
- SAIC – Huntsville
- Teledyne Brown Engineering – Huntsville
- Toyota – Huntsville
- TVA – Decatur/Limestone County
- University of Alabama in Huntsville – Huntsville
- Vulcan Materials Company – Trinity, Huntsville
