= Decatur metropolitan area, Alabama =

Coordinates: 34°34′52″N 86°59′0″W

Decatur Metropolitan Area
- Metropolitan statistical area
- Decatur, AL metropolitan statistical area
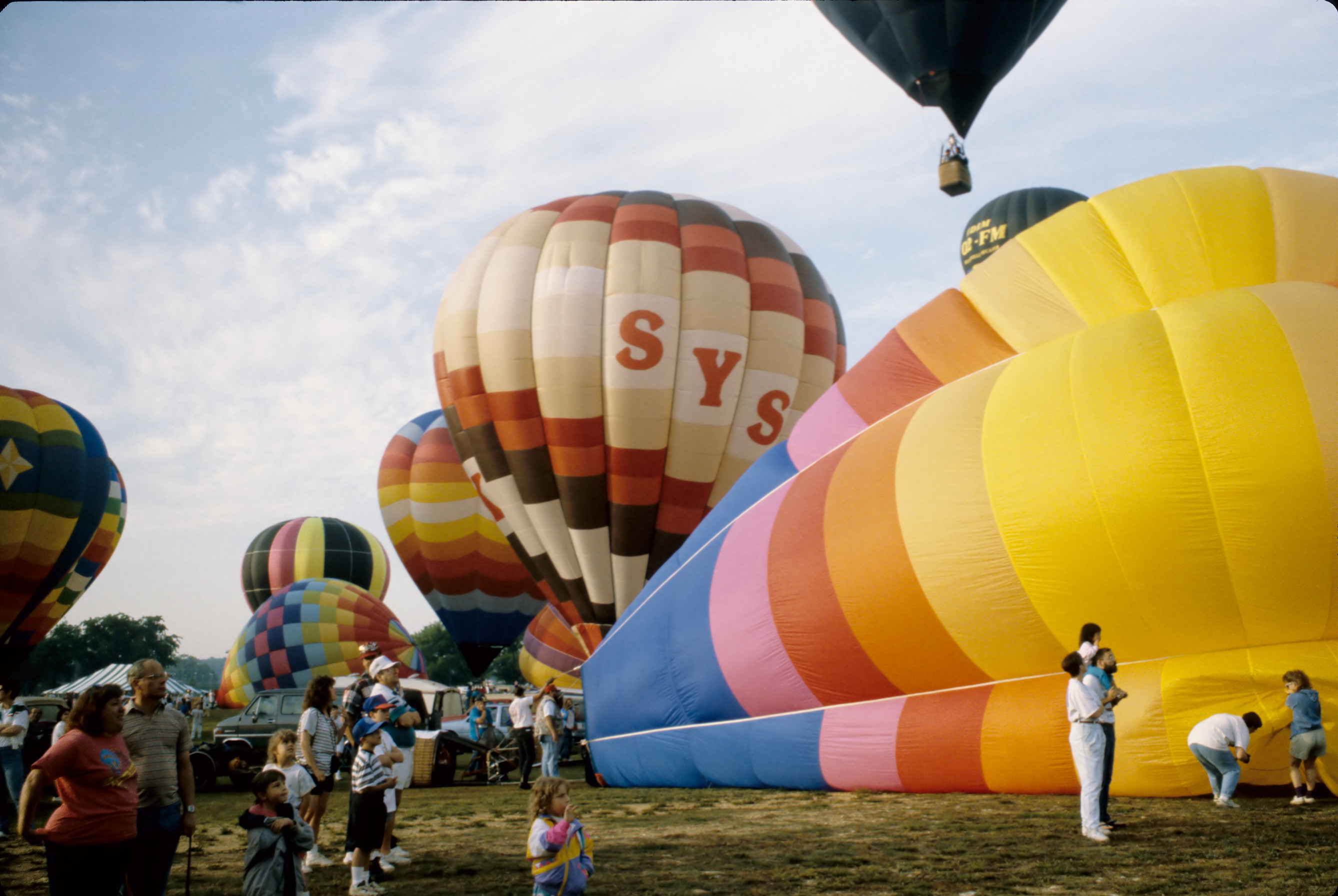
- Alabama Jubilee Hot Air Balloon Classic
Map of Huntsville–Decatur–Albertville, AL–TN CSA
Huntsville metropolitan area
Decatur metropolitan area
Albertville micropolitan area
Fort Payne micropolitan area
Fayetteville micropolitan area
City of Huntsville
City of Decatur
- Country: United States
- State(s): Alabama
- Largest city: Decatur

Area
  - Total: 1,317 sq mi (3,411 km^{2})

Population (2020)
  - Total: 152,740
  - Density: 116.0/sq mi (44.78/km^{2})
- Time zone: UTC-6 (CST)
  - Summer (DST): UTC-5 (CDT)

The Decatur, Alabama Metropolitan Statistical Area is a moderately urban region of North-Central Alabama. The 2020 Census put the population of the metropolitan area at 152,740, of which one-third resides within the boundaries of its core city, Decatur, Alabama, It is also considered to be part of the North, Northwest, and North-Central regions of Alabama.

The metropolitan area is the combined area of the City of Decatur and the surrounding areas in suburban, rural, and more developed parts of Morgan and Lawrence Counties. The Decatur Metropolitan Area is a part of the Huntsville-Decatur CSA, With Huntsville and Madison being other Principal cities in the CSA.

== Cities and towns ==
=== Principal cities ===
- Decatur
- Hartselle
- Moulton
- Huntsville (Has its own MSA, but has lands in Morgan County)

=== Other cities and towns ===
- Courtland
- Eva
- Falkville
- Hillsboro
- North Courtland
- Priceville
- Somerville
- Town Creek
- Trinity

=== Unincorporated communities ===
- Burningtree Mountain
- Caddo
- Cotaco
- Danville
- Five Points
- Flint
- Florette
- Hatton
- Hulaco
- Lacey's Spring
- Landersville
- Mallard Creek
- Morgan City
- Moulton Heights
- Mount Hope
- Neel
- Oakville
- Pittsburg
- Punkin Center
- Red Bank
- Ryan Crossroads
- Speake
- Tanner
- Valhermoso Springs
- Wheeler
- Wren

== Transportation ==
=== Major highways ===
- Interstate 65 (Lacon to Decatur (Limestone County)) - enters the area at the southern Morgan County line between Morgan and Cullman Counties, near Lacon. Bends around a mountain where it passes over US 31. It continues north towards Hartselle where it enters the city limits for about 3 miles. Leaving Hartselle, I-65 travels towards Decatur where small portions of the city limits leak over into rural Priceville. I-65 soon is lifted onto a 3.5-mile-long (5.6 km) bridge (over the Tennessee River), linking Morgan County and Limestone County. After entering Limestone County, an interchange with I-565, Alt US 72, and Alabama 20 give routes to Huntsville (to the east), and Decatur (to the west).
- U.S. Highway 31 (Lacon to Decatur (Limestone County)) - from the southern Morgan County line between Morgan and Cullman Counties, near Lacon. The route continues north, passing under I-65, towards Hartselle. After traversing through Hartselle, US 31 briefly enters unincorporated land, but quickly enters the Decatur city limits. As the highway passes through Decatur, it gives access to places such as: Decatur High School / Ogle Stadium, Cooks Natural Science Museum, and views of the downtown area. US 31 leaves the metro area after passing over the Captain William J. Hudson "Steamboat Bill" Memorial Bridges into Limestone County where the Decatur city limits end. (near the Calhoun Community College)
- U.S. Highway 72 Alternate (Decatur (Limestone County) to Trinity) - enters the metro area in the Limestone County portion of Decatur at the interchange with I-65 and I-565. (I-565 terminates here). Crosses the Tennessee River on the Captain William J. Hudson "Steamboat Bill" Memorial Bridges, combined with US 31 and State Route 20, into urban northern Decatur. Alt 72 bends west and continues into the industrial portion of Decatur. The Port of Decatur, and such notable industries as The United Launch Alliance, Solutia, Vulcan Materials, and 3M have operations along this route. The United Launch Alliance is especially important, since all satellite launch vehicles used by NASA, are produced at this single location. Alt 72 eventually leaves the metro area as it exits Lawrence County, and enters Colbert County of The Shoals.
- U.S. Highway 231 (Lacey's Spring to southern Morgan County) - enters the metro area from southern Huntsville. Crossing the Tennessee River, connecting Madison and northeastern Morgan Counties. US 231 continues south, passing through Morgan City, towards the Gadsden area.
- State Route 20 (Decatur (Limestone County) to western Lawrence County) - enters the metro area in the Limestone County portion of Decatur at the interchange with I-65 and I-565. (I-565 terminates here). Crosses the Tennessee River on the Captain William J. Hudson "Steamboat Bill" Memorial Bridges, combined with US 31 and U.S. Highway 72 Alternate, into urban northern Decatur. Alabama 20 bends west and continues into the industrial portion of Decatur. The Port of Decatur, and such notable industries as The United Launch Alliance, Solutia, Vulcan Materials, and 3M have operations along this route. The United Launch Alliance is especially important, since all satellite launch vehicles used by NASA, are produced at this single location. Alabama 20 eventually leaves the metro area as it exits Lawrence County, and enters Colbert County of The Shoals.
- State Route 24
- State Route 33
- State Route 36
- State Route 67 (Hulaco to US 72 Alt./SR 20 (Decatur)) - enters the area at Hulaco and continues to Somerville. Passes by the old Morgan County Courthouse. Travels through Priceville (past the Racking Horse World Celebration Arena), and enters Decatur at an interchange with I-65. As SR 67 crosses 6th Avenue (US 31) it becomes known as the Beltline, a bypass that was constructed to alleviate traffic problems on the swollen 6th Avenue. The highway continues on a north-northwesterly curve and terminates at US 72 Alt./SR 20 inside Decatur.

== See also ==
- List of Metropolitan areas of Alabama
