= Priceville, Alabama =

- City
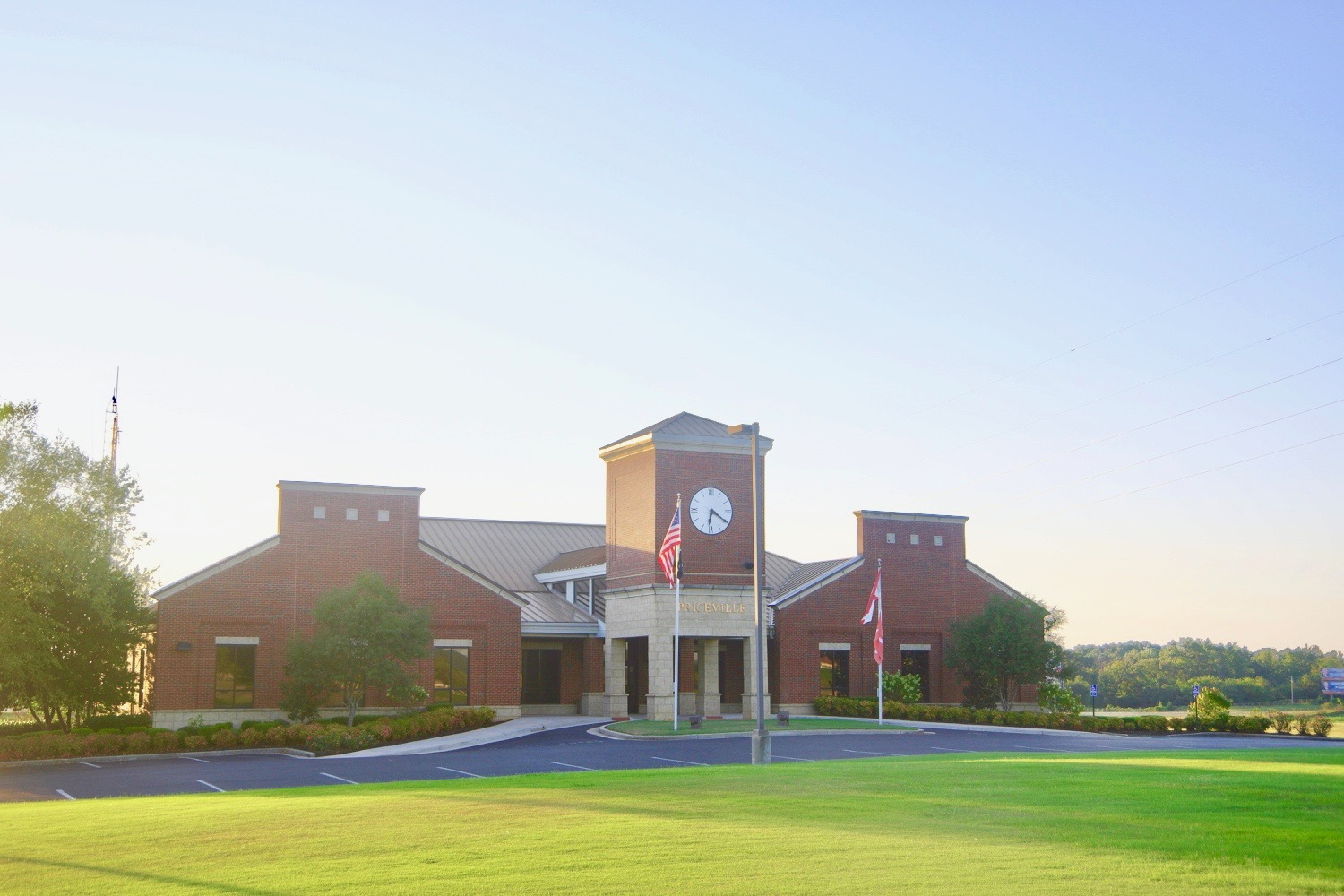
- City Hall

- Flag Logo

- Location in Morgan County, Al
- Coordinates: 34°31′16″N 86°52′47″W
- Country: United States
- State: Alabama
- County: Morgan

Area
  - Total: 5.91 sq mi (15.31 km^{2})
  - Land: 5.88 sq mi (15.22 km^{2})
  - Water: 0.031 sq mi (0.08 km^{2})
- Elevation: 600 ft (180 m)

Population (2020)
  - Total: 3,512
  - Density: 597.5/sq mi (230.69/km^{2})
- Time zone: UTC-6 (Central (CST))
  - Summer (DST): UTC-5 (CDT)
- FIPS code: 01-62472
- GNIS feature ID: 2407160
- Website: cityofpriceville.com

Priceville is the third largest municipality in Morgan County, Alabama, United States and is included in the Decatur Metropolitan Area, as well as the Huntsville-Decatur Combined Statistical Area. The 2020 census counted a population of 3,513, up from 2,658 in 2010.

Priceville was incorporated in 1975.

== History ==
Priceville was settled in the 1820s and is named for the Price family, who played prominent roles in its early history. The community remained sparsely populated until the 1950s, when the construction of Interstate 65 brought rapid economic expansion.

== Geography ==
Priceville is located in northern Morgan County. It is bordered to the west by Decatur, the county seat. State Route 67 runs through the town center, leading northwest 9 miles (14 km) to the center of Decatur and southeast 6 miles (10 km) to Somerville. Interstate 65 passes through the western portion of Priceville, connecting the town with Cullman 26 miles (42 km) to the south and Athens 19 miles (31 km) to the north. The Wheeler National Wildlife Refuge is situated between Priceville and Decatur. The Tennessee River (Wheeler Lake) passes just north of Priceville.

According to the U.S. Census Bureau, the town has a total area of 5.9 square miles (15 km^{2}), of which 0.03 square miles (0.08 km^{2}), or 0.52%, are water.

== Demographics ==
Historical population
Census	Pop.	Note	%±
1980	966		—
1990	1,323		37.0%
2000	1,631		23.3%
2010	2,658		63.0%
2020	3,513		32.2%
U.S. Decennial Census; 2013 Estimate

=== 2020 census ===
Priceville racial composition
Race	Num.	Perc.
White (non-Hispanic)	3,055	86.99%
Black or African American (non-Hispanic)	123	3.5%
Native American	17	0.48%
Asian	52	1.48%
Pacific Islander	2	0.05%
Other/Mixed	152	4.33%
Hispanic or Latino	112	3.19%

As of the 2020 census, Priceville had a population of 3,512. The median age was 41.7 years. 23.5% of residents were under the age of 18 and 20.2% were 65 years of age or older. For every 100 females, there were 90.1 males, and for every 100 females age 18 and over, there were 89.8 males.

69.2% of residents lived in urban areas, while 30.8% lived in rural areas.

There were 1,329 households in Priceville, of which 35.4% had children under the age of 18 living in them. Of all households, 63.1% were married-couple households, 12.3% were households with a male householder and no spouse or partner present, and 21.1% were households with a female householder and no spouse or partner present. About 20.4% of all households were made up of individuals and 11.8% had someone living alone who was 65 years of age or older. As of the 2020 census, there were 945 families residing in the town.

There were 1,377 housing units, of which 3.5% were vacant. The homeowner vacancy rate was 1.0% and the rental vacancy rate was 5.3%.

=== 2010 census ===
As of the census of 2010, there were 2,658 people, 620 households, and 518 families residing in the town. The population density was 316.2 inhabitants per square mile (122.1/km^{2}). There were 637 housing units at an average density of 123.5 per square mile (47.7/km^{2}). The racial makeup of the town was 95.89% White, 2.27% Black or African American, 0.67% Native American, 0.18% Asian, 0.55% from other races, and 0.43% from two or more races. 1.23% of the population were Hispanic or Latino of any race.

There were 620 households, out of which 33.2% had children under the age of 18 living with them, 73.2% were married couples living together, 6.6% had a female householder with no husband present, and 16.3% were non-families. 13.5% of all households were made up of individuals, and 5.2% had someone living alone who was 65 years of age or older. The average household size was 2.63 and the average family size was 2.89.

In the town, the population was spread out, with 23.9% under the age of 18, 7.0% from 18 to 24, 29.7% from 25 to 44, 28.3% from 45 to 64, and 11.2% who were 65 years of age or older. The median age was 38 years. For every 100 females, there were 99.6 males. For every 100 females age 18 and over, there were 98.2 males.

The median income for a household in the town was $51,875, and the median income for a family was $55,885. Males had a median income of $37,679 versus $28,750 for females. The per capita income for the town was $22,056. About 2.2% of families and 5.6% of the population were below the poverty line, including 13.9% of those under age 18 and none of those age 65 or over.
