= North Alabama =

Region in Alabama

Coordinates: 34°53′13.41″N 86°19′25.32″W

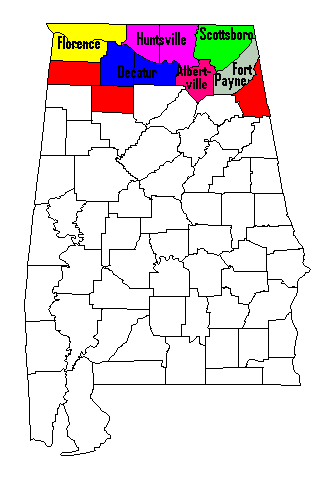
Map of North Alabama counties shaded in, with metropolitan areas labeled. (counties not included in a metropolitan area are shaded in red)

North Alabama is a region of the U.S. state of Alabama. Several geographic definitions for the area exist, with all descriptions including the nine counties of Alabama's Tennessee Valley region. The North Alabama Industrial Development Association also lists Cherokee, Cullman, Franklin, and Winston counties in the region. The Alabama Mountain Lakes Tourist Association expands the definition further to include Blount, Etowah, and Marion counties.

Huntsville is the region's largest metropolitan area. Decatur and Florence-Muscle Shoals are classified as metropolitan areas as well. Albertville, Cullman, Fort Payne, and Scottsboro are each the hubs of their own micropolitan regions. Other cities of notable size include Madison and Athens.

Locals tend to refer to this area as the "Tennessee Valley" in reference to the Tennessee River, which flows through the northernmost part of the state. Large parts of North Alabama are low upland, the eastern regions part of the Cumberland Plateau, marked by tablelands incised with gorges, some of them, such as Little River Canyon in DeKalb County, of considerable depth.

== Climate ==
North Alabama has a humid subtropical climate (Köppen climate classification Cfa). It experiences hot, humid summers and generally mild winters, with average high temperatures ranging from near 90 °F (32.2 °C) in the summer to 49 °F (9.4 °C) during winter.

== Geography ==
North Alabama is bordered to the north by Middle Tennessee, to the east by northwest Georgia, to the south by Central Alabama and the Birmingham metropolitan area, and to the west by North Mississippi. The entire region is located in the Central Time Zone.

=== Topography ===
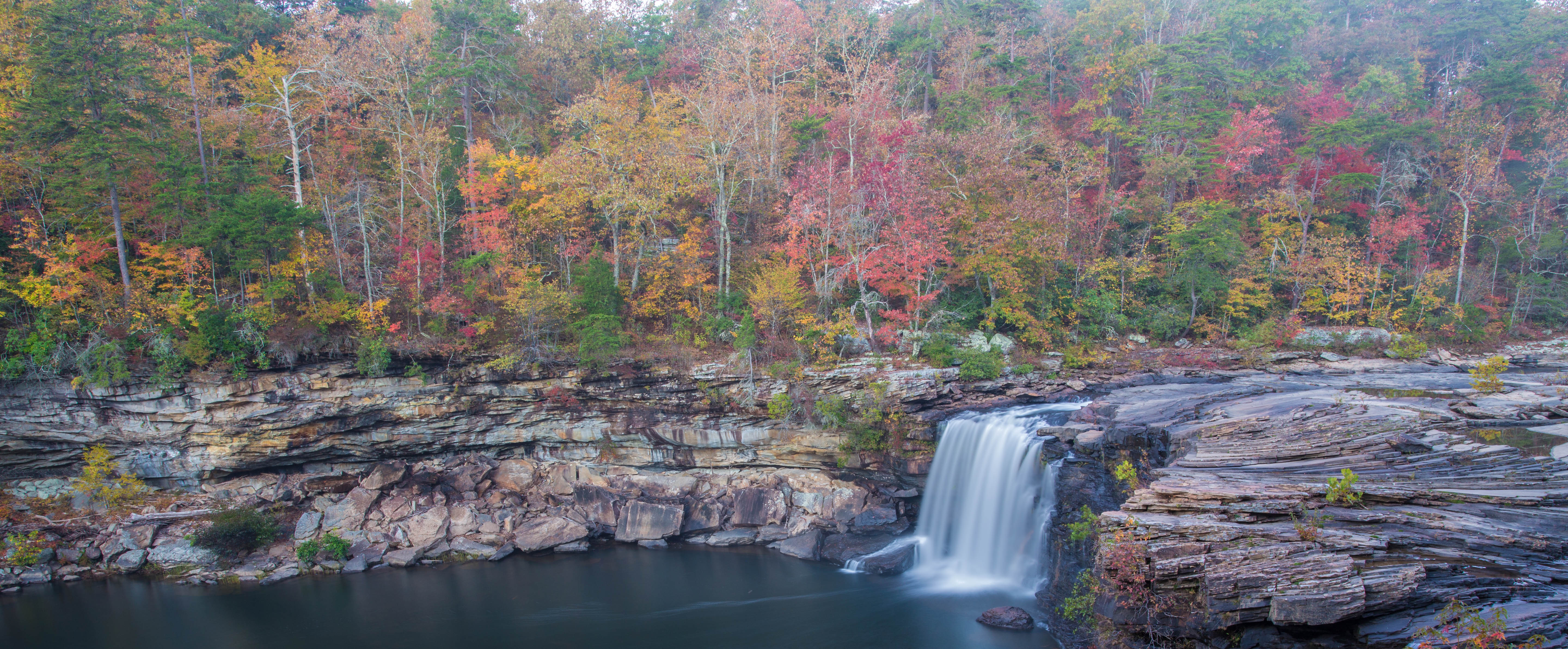
Little River Canyon is a distinct feature of North Alabama’s Cumberland Plateau region.

The Tennessee River traverses nearly the entire width of North Alabama, flowing southwest into the state near Bridgeport, and flowing northwest out of the state near Waterloo. All of the region’s metropolitan areas are located in the Tennessee River valley. TVA hydroelectric dams create the reservoirs of Guntersville Lake, Wheeler Lake, and Wilson Lake along the river’s course through Alabama. Alabama Power also manages two reservoirs in the region, maintaining Weiss Lake on the Coosa River and Lewis Smith Lake on the Black Warrior River.

Geologically, the Cumberland Plateau, marked by wooded steep-sided plateaus separated by deep valleys, dominates the eastern portion of the region. The Highland Rim, covered mostly by the Tennessee River delta, includes the north-central and northwestern portions of the region. The Valley and Ridge section, defined by narrow ridges separated by steep valleys, covers parts of the southeastern portion of the region. The far western areas of the region are covered by a northern stretch of the East Gulf Coastal Plain.

=== Counties ===
North Alabama comprises the following counties, according to the most common definition of the region.

- Cherokee (County seat: Centre)
- Colbert (County seat: Tuscumbia)
- Cullman (County seat: Cullman)
- DeKalb (County seat: Fort Payne)
- Franklin (County seat: Russellville)
- Jackson (County seat: Scottsboro)
- Lauderdale (County seat: Florence)
- Lawrence (County seat: Moulton)
- Limestone (County seat: Athens)
- Madison (County seat: Huntsville)
- Marshall (County seat: Guntersville)
- Morgan (County seat: Decatur)
- Winston (County seat: Double Springs)

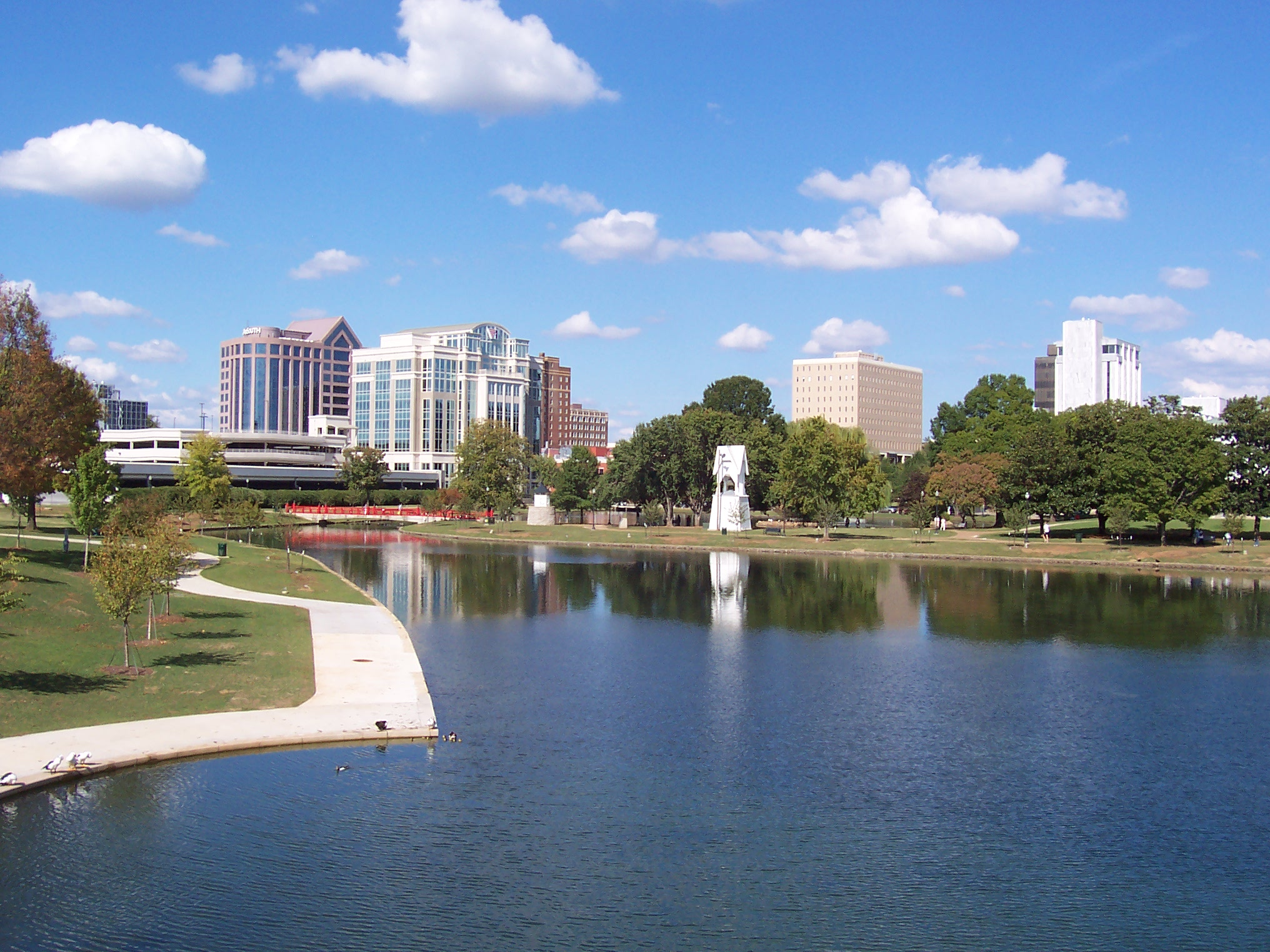
A view of Downtown Huntsville, The largest city in North Alabama

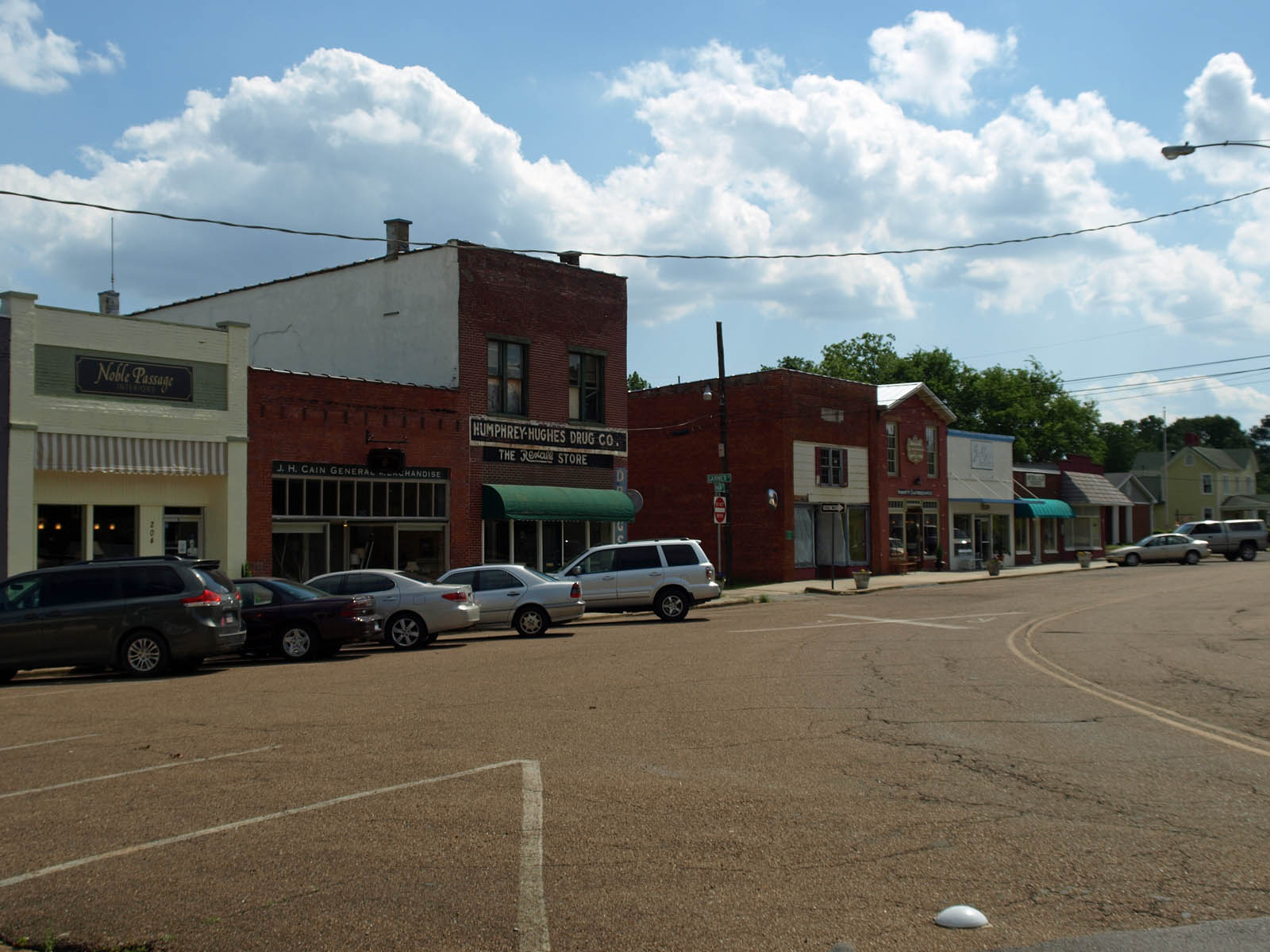
Downtown Madison, The Second largest city in North Alabama

=== Metropolitan areas ===
- Huntsville–Decatur-Albertville combined statistical area (Pop. 774,480)
- Huntsville metropolitan area (Pop. 481,681. Principal cities: Huntsville, Madison, Athens)
- Decatur metropolitan area (Pop. 152,740. Principal cities: Decatur, Hartselle, Moulton)
- The Shoals (Pop. 148,779. Principal cities: Florence, Muscle Shoals, Sheffield, Tuscumbia)

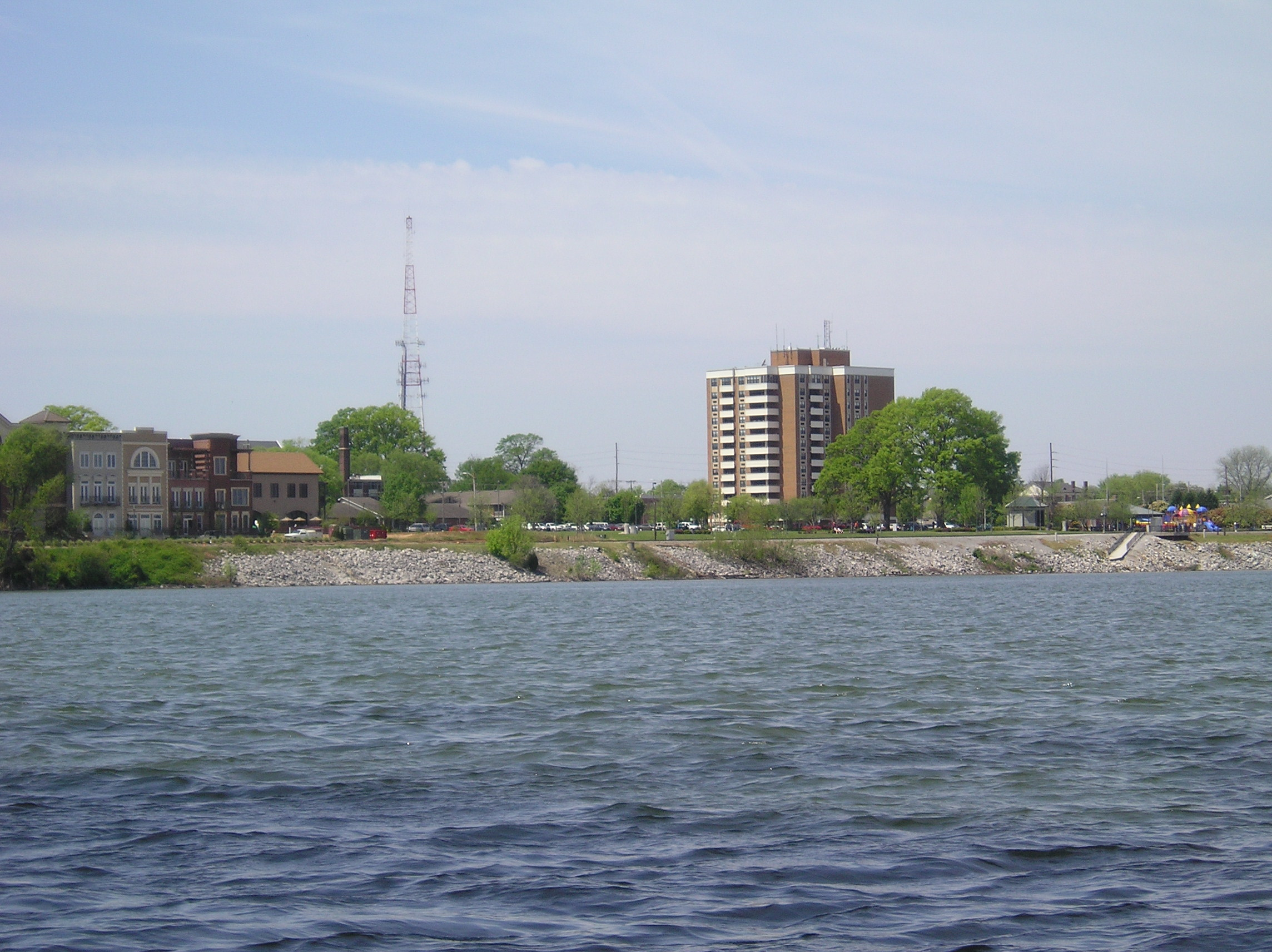
Decatur seen from the Tennessee River, is the third largest city in North Alabama

=== Micropolitan areas ===
- Albertville micropolitan area
- Cullman micropolitan area
- Fort Payne micropolitan area
- Scottsboro micropolitan area

== Economy ==
The northern areas of Alabama contain a wide variety of industrial, manufacturing, and high-tech corporations with both large and small operations. Each of the three economic centers in the region (Huntsville, Decatur, and Florence) have a distinct type of economic base. The entire region relies heavily on row-crop, cattle and poultry production. Agribusiness plays a vital role in The Valley. Some of the largest row-crop operations in the state reside on farms in The Valley.

The Huntsville area is home to the U.S. Army’s Redstone Arsenal, the largest employer in the region, as well as NASA’s Marshall Spaceflight Center. Nearby Cummings Research Park, the second largest research park in the nation, is home to high-tech defense contracting firms such as Boeing, SAIC, and Dynetics. Huntsville has also increasingly become a center for auto manufacturing, with Toyota Manufacturing Alabama and the joint venture Mazda Toyota Manufacturing USA both located in the city.

The Decatur area, in the central part of the region, has long been a center for shipping and manufacturing due to its location on the Tennessee River. It is home to numerous industrial and manufacturing companies, including General Electric, Nucor, and 3M. Food processing facilities such as Wayne Farms and Gemstone Foods have significant facilities in the area as well. United Launch Alliance produces launch vehicles for NASA and other agencies at its manufacturing, assembly, and integration facility in Decatur. The Tennessee Valley Authority also has roots in the area.

The Florence-Muscle Shoals area, also known as "The Shoals", hosts an array of manufacturing companies, including North American Lightning, Constellium, and FreightCar America. Many residents of the Shoals are employed in healthcare and education.

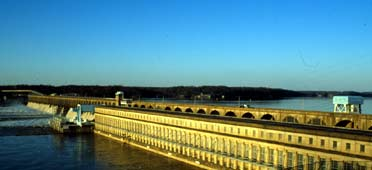
Wilson Dam is a part of the Tennessee Valley Authority's valuable impact on the North Alabama economy.

== Tourism ==
The most visited attractions in North Alabama are the U.S. Space and Rocket Center, Wheeler Wildlife Refuge, the Robert Trent Jones Golf Trail, and Point Mallard Park. Other popular destinations include Lake Guntersville State Park, Joe Wheeler State Park, Huntsville Botanical Gardens, Little River Canyon National Preserve, the Shrine of the Most Blessed Sacrament, the Alabama Music Hall of Fame, and the Cook Museum of Natural Science. The area’s largest annual festival is the W.C. Handy Music Festival.

== Education ==
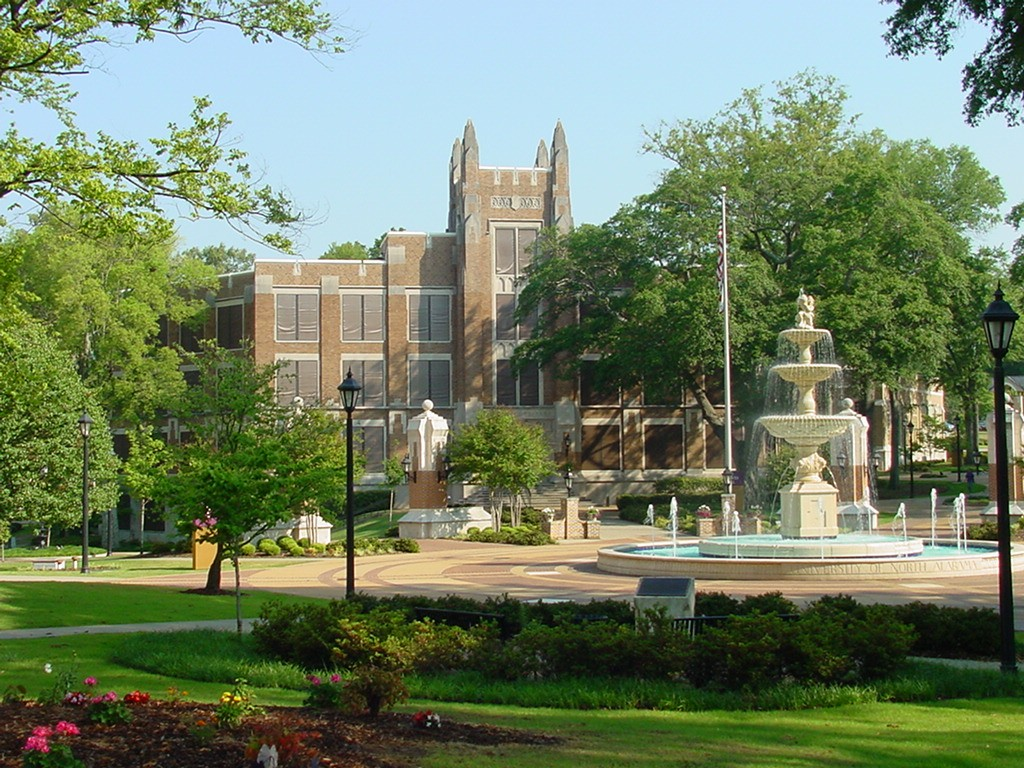
The University of North Alabama is Alabama’s oldest public university.

North Alabama is home to several two and four year colleges. The region’s public universities are Alabama A&M University, Athens State University, the University of North Alabama, and the University of Alabama in Huntsville. Oakwood University is the area’s largest private university. Two year colleges in the area include Calhoun Community College, J.F. Drake State Community & Technical College, Northeast Alabama Community College, Northwest-Shoals Community College, Snead State Community College, and Wallace State Community College.

== See also ==
- University of North Alabama
- The University of Alabama in Huntsville
- List of Appalachian Regional Commission counties#Alabama
