= Trinity, Alabama =

- Town
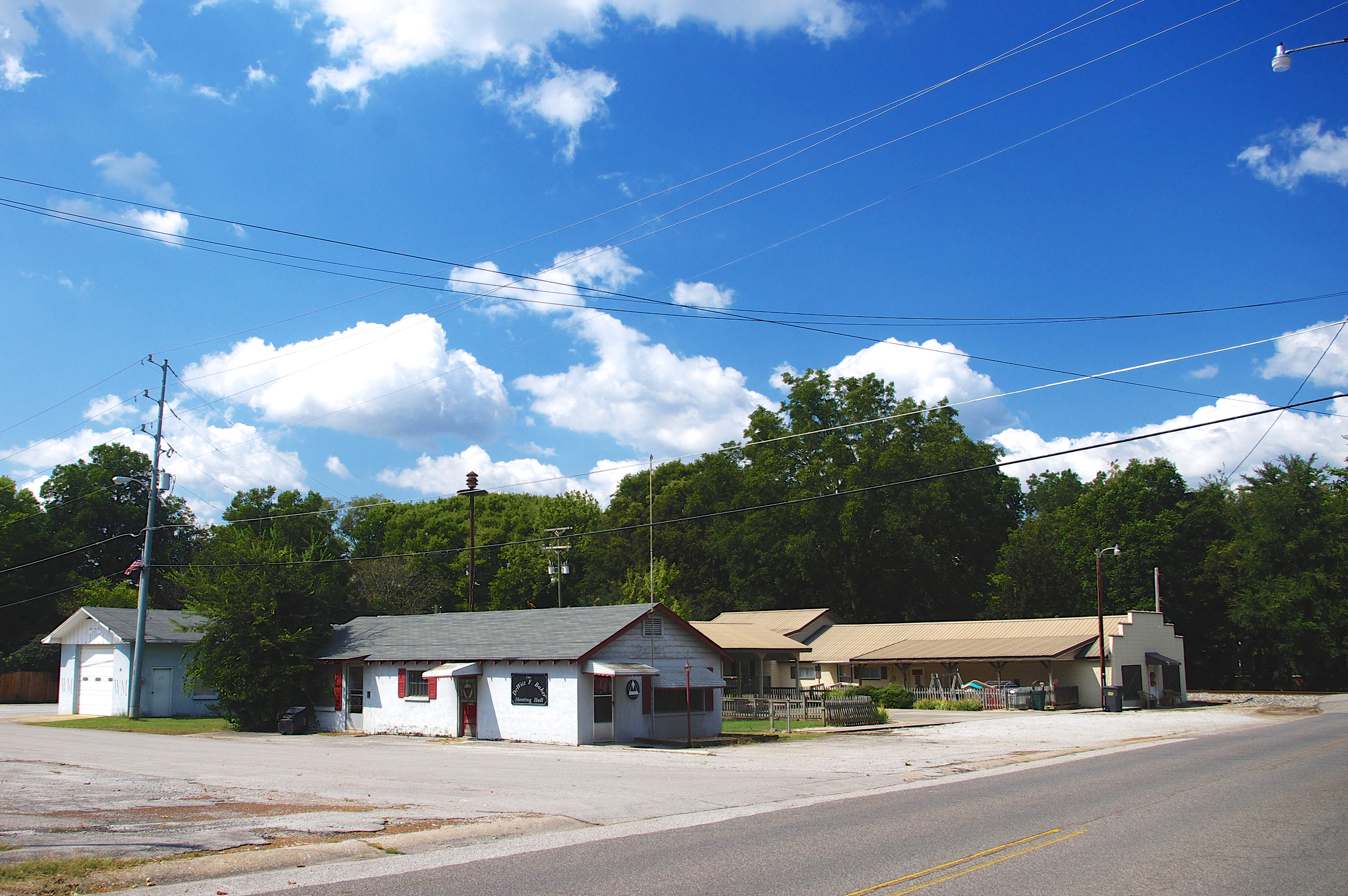
- Seneca Drive

- Location in Morgan County, Alabama
- Coordinates: 34°36′14″N 87°5′10″W
- Country: United States
- State: Alabama
- County: Morgan

Area
  - Total: 4.97 sq mi (12.88 km^{2})
  - Land: 4.97 sq mi (12.86 km^{2})
  - Water: 0.0077 sq mi (0.02 km^{2})
- Elevation: 679 ft (207 m)

Population (2020)
  - Total: 2,526
  - Density: 509/sq mi (196.4/km^{2})
- Time zone: UTC-6 (Central (CST))
  - Summer (DST): UTC-5 (CDT)
- ZIP code: 35673
- Area code: 256
- FIPS code: 01-76872
- GNIS feature ID: 2406755
- Website: trinityal.gov

Trinity is a town in Morgan County, Alabama, United States. It is included in the Decatur Metropolitan Area and the Huntsville-Decatur Combined Statistical Area. As of the 2020 census, the population of the town was 2,526, up from 2,095 in 2010. It was incorporated in 1901.

== History ==
Trinity was developed in the 1810s as area plantation owners built houses atop Trinity Mountain to escape the mosquito-infested lowlands. A post office operated at Trinity from 1848 to 1853. The post office reopened under the name "Trinity Station" in 1866. The town incorporated in 1901, and changed its name to simply "Trinity" two years later.

== Geography ==
Trinity is located in northwestern Morgan County across a scattered area mostly between U.S. Route 72 on the north and State Route 24 to the south (though the town's municipal boundaries extend slightly beyond each road). Decatur lies just to the east, and Wheeler Lake (part of the Tennessee River) lies to the north. The southern parts of the town are located atop Trinity Mountain, a broad ridge that rises several hundred feet above the surrounding terrain. The town is bordered to the west by Lawrence County.

According to the U.S. Census Bureau, the town has a total area of 5.0 square miles (13 km^{2}), of which 0.008 square miles (0.021 km^{2}), or 0.16%, are water.

== Demographics ==
Historical population
Census	Pop.	Note	%±
1880	142		—
1900	191		—
1910	198		3.7%
1920	243		22.7%
1930	208		−14.4%
1940	249		19.7%
1950	342		37.3%
1960	454		32.7%
1970	881		94.1%
1980	1,328		50.7%
1990	1,380		3.9%
2000	1,841		33.4%
2010	2,095		13.8%
2020	2,526		20.6%
U.S. Decennial Census

=== 2020 census ===
As of the 2020 census, Trinity had a population of 2,526. The median age was 40.8 years. 23.5% of residents were under the age of 18 and 16.0% of residents were 65 years of age or older. For every 100 females there were 102.9 males, and for every 100 females age 18 and over there were 100.4 males age 18 and over.

78.2% of residents lived in urban areas, while 21.8% lived in rural areas.

There were 959 households in Trinity, including 637 families. Of all households, 33.5% had children under the age of 18 living in them, 61.4% were married-couple households, 16.0% were households with a male householder and no spouse or partner present, and 18.7% were households with a female householder and no spouse or partner present. About 21.0% of all households were made up of individuals, and 7.8% had someone living alone who was 65 years of age or older.

There were 1,013 housing units, of which 5.3% were vacant. The homeowner vacancy rate was 1.9% and the rental vacancy rate was 18.1%.

Trinity racial composition
Race	Num.	Perc.
White (non-Hispanic)	1,873	74.15%
Black or African American (non-Hispanic)	223	8.83%
Native American	24	0.95%
Asian	5	0.2%
Other/Mixed	119	4.71%
Hispanic or Latino	282	11.16%

=== 2010 census ===
At the 2010 census there were 2,095 people, 783 households, and 647 families living in the town. The population density was 581.9 inhabitants per square mile (224.7/km^{2}). There were 823 housing units at an average density of 228.6 per square mile (88.3/km^{2}). The racial makeup of the town was 88.6% White, 6.7% Black or African American, 1.1% Native American, 0.2% Asian, 1.7% from other races, and 1.6% from two or more races. 3.3% of the population were Hispanic or Latino of any race.

Of the 783 households 35.8% had children under the age of 18 living with them, 71.9% were married couples living together, 6.9% had a female householder with no husband present, and 17.4% were non-families. 14.6% of households were one person and 5.4% were one person aged 65 or older. The average household size was 2.68 and the average family size was 2.95.

The age distribution was 25.8% under the age of 18, 6.0% from 18 to 24, 26.2% from 25 to 44, 29.5% from 45 to 64, and 12.6% 65 or older. The median age was 40.3 years. For every 100 females, there were 100.7 males. For every 100 females age 18 and over, there were 101.9 males.

The median household income was $61,060 and the median family income was $71,818. Males had a median income of $54,250 versus $34,205 for females. The per capita income for the town was $28,628. About .9% of families and 2.7% of the population were below the poverty line, including 1.7% of those under age 18 and 3.7% of those age 65 or over.

=== 2000 census ===
At the 2000 census there were 1,841 people, 691 households, and 563 families living in the town. The population density was 508.5 inhabitants per square mile (196.3/km^{2}). There were 728 housing units at an average density of 201.1 per square mile (77.6/km^{2}). The racial makeup of the town was 88.00% White, 9.61% Black or African American, 1.25% Native American, 0.11% White, 0.16% from other races, and 0.87% from two or more races. 1.14% of the population were Hispanic or Latino of any race.

Of the 691 households 38.4% had children under the age of 18 living with them, 69.9% were married couples living together, 8.5% had a female householder with no husband present, and 18.4% were non-families. 16.2% of households were one person and 6.5% were one person aged 65 or older. The average household size was 2.65 and the average family size was 2.96.

The age distribution was 25.7% under the age of 18, 6.1% from 18 to 24, 31.2% from 25 to 44, 26.1% from 45 to 64, and 10.8% 65 or older. The median age was 38 years. For every 100 females, there were 94.6 males. For every 100 females age 18 and over, there were 91.1 males.

The median household income was $54,271 and the median family income was $60,139. Males had a median income of $43,393 versus $27,552 for females. The per capita income for the town was $21,467. About 4.6% of families and 6.0% of the population were below the poverty line, including 7.7% of those under age 18 and 5.8% of those age 65 or over.
