= Muck City =

Muck City may refer to:

- Muck City, Alabama, U.S.
- Belle Glade, Florida, U.S., sometimes referred to as Muck City
- Muck City, a 2012 book by Bryan Mealer
