= Hillsboro, Alabama =

- Town
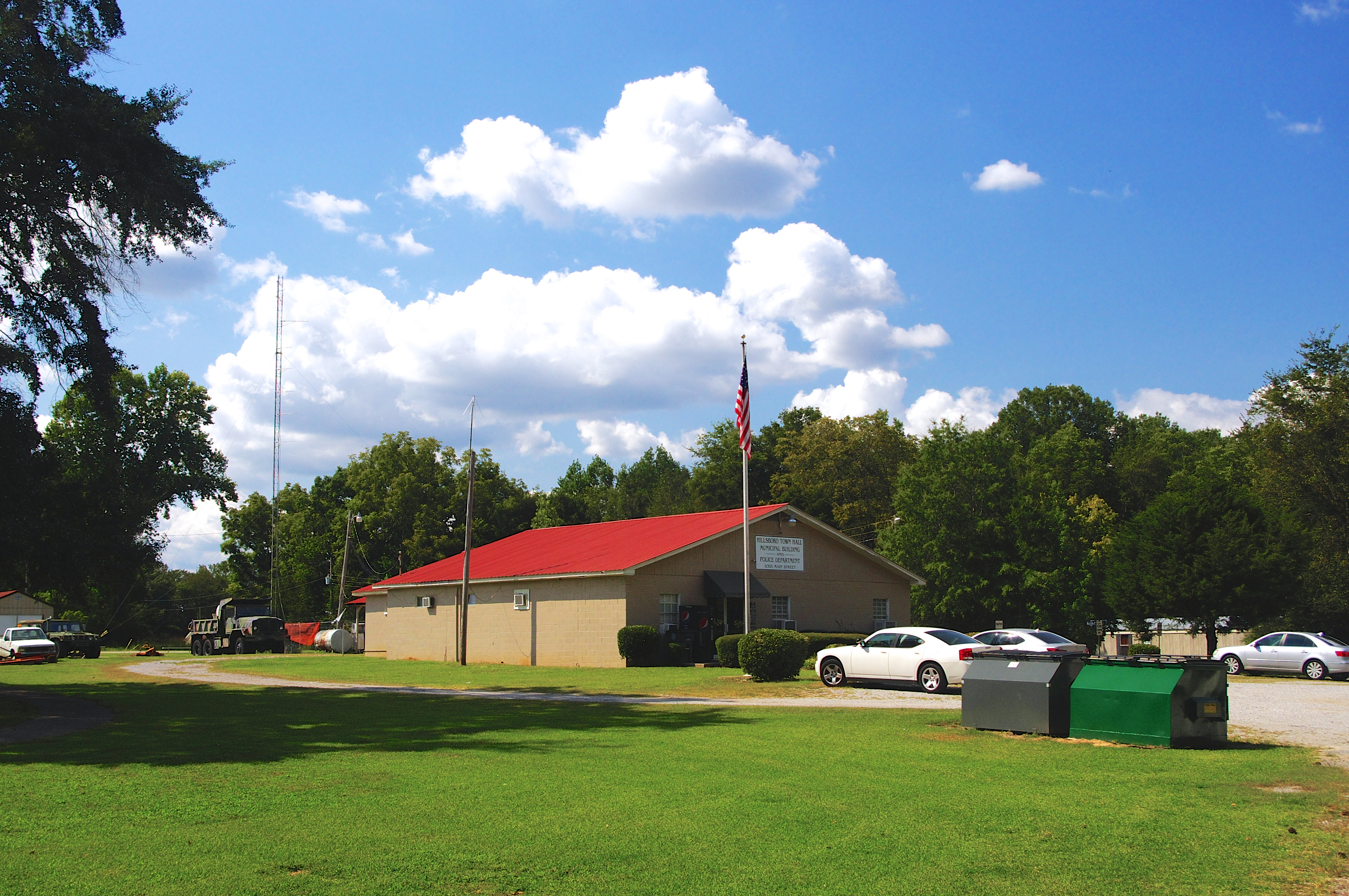
- Hillsboro Town Hall

- Location of Hillsboro in Lawrence County, Alabama.
- Coordinates: 34°38′27″N 87°11′02″W
- Country: United States
- State: Alabama
- County: Lawrence

Area
  - Total: 1.88 sq mi (4.88 km^{2})
  - Land: 1.88 sq mi (4.87 km^{2})
  - Water: 0.0039 sq mi (0.01 km^{2})
- Elevation: 597 ft (182 m)

Population (2020)
  - Total: 407
  - Density: 216.3/sq mi (83.53/km^{2})
- Time zone: UTC-6 (Central (CST))
  - Summer (DST): UTC-5 (CDT)
- ZIP code: 35643
- Area code: 256
- FIPS code: 01-34816
- GNIS feature ID: 2405838

Hillsboro is a town in Lawrence County, Alabama, and is included in the Decatur Metropolitan Area, as well as the Huntsville-Decatur Combined Statistical Area. It was incorporated in 1899. As of the 2020 census, Hillsboro had a population of 407. Along with North Courtland, it is one of two majority black communities in Lawrence County out of its six populated communities as of 2010.

== History ==
Hillsboro began in the late 1830s as a small community known as "Gilmersville," which was located east of the current town. The name was inspired by a family of early settlers. When the railroad was constructed through the area in the 1860s, the town shifted to its current location along the tracks. The town developed throughout the latter half of the 19th century as an important refueling stop for trains and a local shipping center. The town's name was eventually changed to "Hillsborough," and the current spelling was adopted in 1891.

== Geography ==
Hillsboro is concentrated along County Road 217 (Main Street) just south of the road's railroad crossing, a few miles west of Decatur, and a few miles south of Wheeler Lake. The town's municipal boundaries extend northward to U.S. Route 72.

According to the U.S. Census Bureau, the town has a total area of 1.9 square miles (4.9 km^{2}), all land.

== Demographics ==
Historical population
Census	Pop.	Note	%±
1880	218		—
1900	256		—
1910	202		−21.1%
1920	248		22.8%
1930	240		−3.2%
1940	292		21.7%
1950	257		−12.0%
1960	218		−15.2%
1970	222		1.8%
1980	278		25.2%
1990	587		111.2%
2000	608		3.6%
2010	552		−9.2%
2020	407		−26.3%
U.S. Decennial Census; 2013 Estimate

=== 2020 census ===
Hillsboro town, Alabama – Racial and ethnic composition Note: the US Census treats Hispanic/Latino as an ethnic category. This table excludes Latinos from the racial categories and assigns them to a separate category. Hispanics/Latinos may be of any race.
Race / Ethnicity (NH = Non-Hispanic)	Pop 2010	Pop 2020	% 2010	% 2020
White alone (NH)	78	48	14.13%	11.79%
Black or African American alone (NH)	441	337	79.89%	82.80%
Native American or Alaska Native alone (NH)	10	3	1.81%	0.74%
Asian alone (NH)	0	0	0.00%	0.00%
Pacific Islander alone (NH)	1	0	0.18%	0.00%
Some Other Race alone (NH)	0	0	0.00%	0.00%
Mixed Race or Multi-Racial (NH)	13	11	2.36%	2.70%
Hispanic or Latino (any race)	9	8	1.63%	1.97%
Total	552	407	100.00%	100.00%

As of the 2020 United States census, there were 407 people, 215 households, and 143 families residing in the city.

=== 2000 census ===
As of the census of 2000, there were 608 people, 221 households, and 169 families residing in the town. The population density was 317.2 inhabitants per square mile (122.5/km^{2}). There were 249 housing units at an average density of 129.9 per square mile (50.2/km^{2}). The racial makeup of the town was 14.64% White, 82.24% Black or African American, 1.81% Native American, 0.16% from other races, and 1.15% from two or more races. 0.99% of the population were Hispanic or Latino of any race.

There were 221 households, out of which 34.8% had children under the age of 18 living with them, 50.2% were married couples living together, 23.1% had a female householder with no husband present, and 23.1% were non-families. 21.7% of all households were made up of individuals, and 9.0% had someone living alone who was 65 years of age or older. The average household size was 2.75 and the average family size was 3.22.

In the town, the population was spread out, with 27.0% under the age of 18, 8.1% from 18 to 24, 31.7% from 25 to 44, 23.2% from 45 to 64, and 10.0% who were 65 years of age or older. The median age was 35 years. For every 100 females, there were 83.1 males. For every 100 females age 18 and over, there were 76.2 males.

The median income for a household in the town was $40,714, and the median income for a family was $52,000. Males had a median income of $26,979 versus $22,083 for females. The per capita income for the town was $14,457. About 3.9% of families and 7.4% of the population were below the poverty line, including 5.9% of those under age 18 and 22.9% of those age 65 or over.

== Notable persons ==
- Rudolph M. Clay, former mayor of Gary, Indiana and member of the Indiana Senate
- Joseph Wheeler, former Confederate Army and U.S. Army major general
