= Lawrence County School District =

Lawrence County School District may refer to:

- Lawrence County Schools, Alabama
- Lawrence County School District (Arkansas)
- Lawrence County School District (Mississippi)
