= Alabama State Route 67 =

State highway in Alabama, United States

State Route 67

Route information
- Maintained by ALDOT
- Length: 47 mi (76 km)
- Existed: 1940–present

Major junctions
- South end: US 231 in northern Blount County
- SR 69 near Baileyton; SR 36 near Somerville; I-65 at Priceville; US 31 in Decatur; SR 24 in Decatur; SR 20 in Decatur
- North end: End of State Maintenance / 3M Plant in Decatur

Location
- Country: United States
- State: Alabama

Highway system
- Alabama State Highway System; Interstate; US; State
← SR 66	→ SR 68

State Route 67 (SR 67) is a 47.107-mile-long (75.811 km) state highway in the U.S. state of Alabama that connects the city of Decatur to U.S. Route 231 (US 231) at Rainbow Crossing in Blount County. This highway serves as a connector between Decatur and Gadsden.

== Route description ==
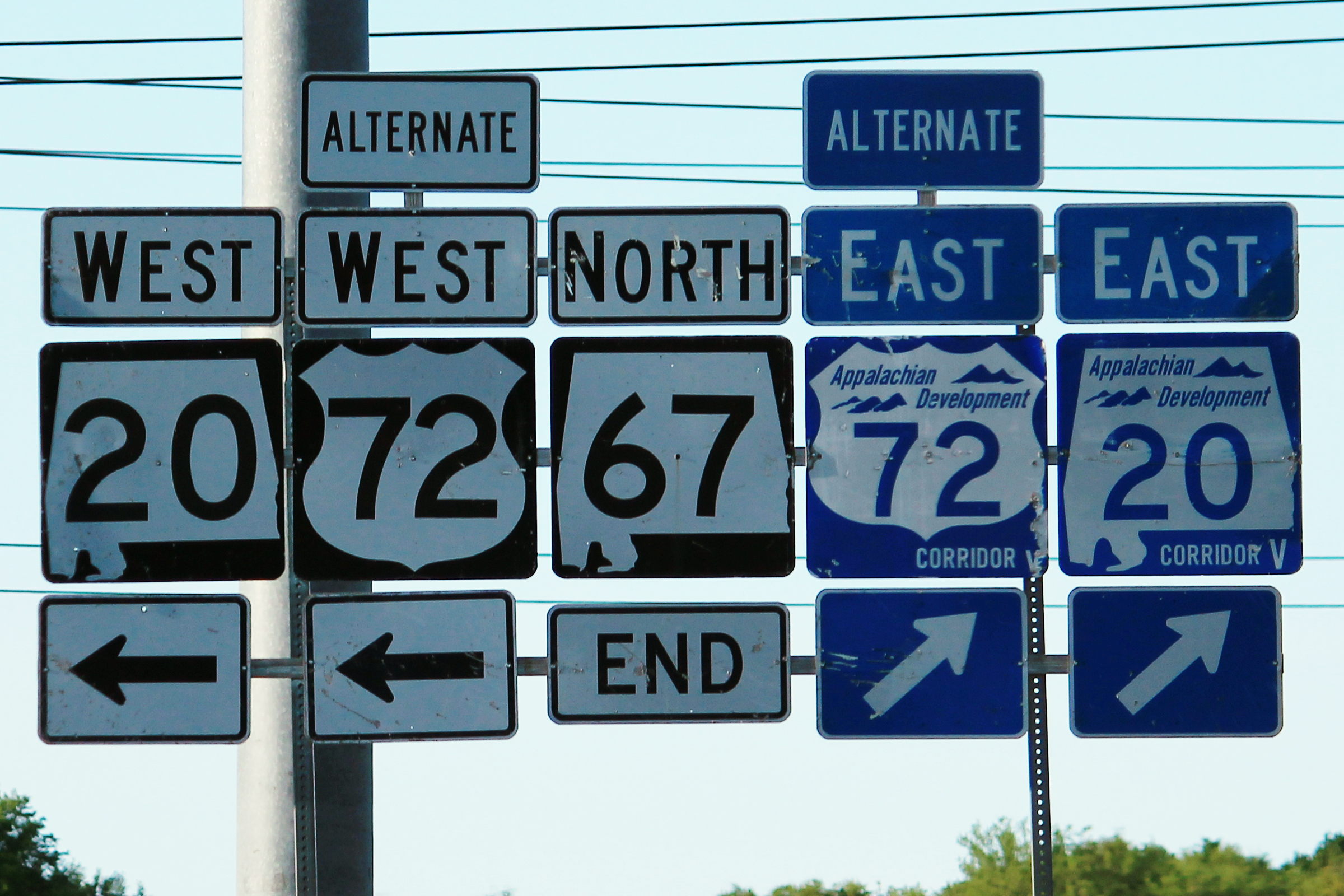
Former northern terminus

SR 67 begins at the entrance to the 3M plant along State Docks Road; this is also the end of state maintenance of the road; new reassurance markers were added to mark this new terminus in early 2019. Past this point, the road continues as a road servicing several important power plants in northern Decatur.

After a half-mile concurrency between The Beltline and State Docks Road with SR 20 and U.S. 72 Alternate—both State Docks Road and The Beltline carry SR-67's name—the route turns south onto The Beltline. This junction is often believed to be the northern terminus of the route.

The mile-long stretch between here and SR 24 carries on the Corridor V name. It loses the name at the Parclo interchange with SR 24. The route continues south as The Beltline. It passes by a Martin's—a clothing chain also known as Wakefield's in Oxford; this chain has stores only in Alabama—and continues southeast to the Decatur Mall. It continues east across a railroad bridge to U.S. 31. The majority of this stretch is four-laned to six-laned.

It continues southeast to Priceville, where it passes by a Publix supermarket—the second one along the route—and continues to another strip of restaurants and gas stations, junctioning with I-65—where it loses The Beltline name and continues to a FoodLand supermarket. About half of a mile later, the route loses two lanes and climbs up a hill and exits Priceville a few miles later. The route continues for about five miles to Somerville. It then passes by a post office and then continues onward to another part of Somerville—referred to by some as Pence—where it passes by a Jack's fast-food restaurant and junctions with SR 36. Immediately after this junction is mile marker 24. The route continues for about four miles to Brewer, just north of Eva. it continues onward through slightly hilly terrain until it gains a lane southbound and climbs up another hill into Hulaco. It eventually crosses into Cullman County.

It then junctions with SR 69 in Baileyton. It passes through hilly terrain to the Blount County line.

It then continues south and gradually turns east again and junctions with U.S. 231, almost directly above U.S. 231's junction with US 278. This is SR 67's southern terminus.

== Future ==
Over time, The Beltline currently has its own traffic problem and provided ample space for large businesses with interest in Decatur. Plans are underway to widen The Beltline from its current size of four lanes to six lanes to help move traffic along more smoothly. One of the businesses that has contributed to congestion is the Decatur Mall, the only mall in the Decatur metropolitan area.

== Major intersections ==
County	Location	mi	km	Destinations	Notes
Blount		0.000	0.000	US 231 (SR 53) – Arab, Attalla, Birmingham, Gadsden	Southern terminus
Cullman	Baileyton	8.805	14.170	SR 69 – Cullman, Guntersville	
Morgan	Somerville	24.089	38.767	SR 36 – Hartselle	
Morgan	Priceville	34.636	55.741	I-65 – Birmingham, Huntsville	I-65 exit 334
Morgan	Decatur	38.982	62.735	US 31 (SR 3) – Cullman, Athens, Point Mallard Park	
Morgan		44.099	70.970	SR 24 west / Moulton Street – Moulton, Decatur	Interchange; signed western terminus of SR 24
Morgan		45.312	72.923	US 72 Alt. / SR 20	Northern terminus
1.000 mi = 1.609 km; 1.000 km = 0.621 mi: Concurrency terminus
