= Lacey's Spring, Alabama =

- Unincorporated community
- Location within Alabama Location within the United States
- Coordinates: 34°32′03″N 86°36′15″W
- Country: United States
- State: Alabama
- County: Morgan
- Elevation: 709 ft (216 m)
- Time zone: UTC-6 (Central (CST))
  - Summer (DST): UTC-5 (CDT)
- ZIP code: 35754
- Area code: 256
- GNIS feature ID: 151973

Lacey's Spring is an unincorporated community in northeastern Morgan County, Alabama, United States at the base of Brindlee Mountain. Despite adjoining the southern outskirts of a much grown Huntsville, it remains in Morgan County's Decatur Metropolitan Area. Lacey's Spring also contributes to the Huntsville-Decatur Combined Statistical Area.

The community was established by three Virginia-born brothers, Hopkins, John, and Theophilus Lacy. The community took on their name and became the site for a U.S. post office in February 1831. "Lacy's Spring" became "Lacey's Spring" when the postal seal furnished by Washington officials mistakenly inserted an "e" into the name.
