= Neel, Alabama =

- Unincorporated community
- Neel, Alabama, in 2012, seen from west of the five-way stop.

- Location within Alabama Location within the United States
- Coordinates: 34°27′56″N 87°03′40″W
- Country: United States
- State: Alabama
- County: Morgan
- Elevation: 620 ft (189 m)
- Time zone: UTC-6 (Central (CST))
  - Summer (DST): UTC-5 (CDT)
- ZIP code: 35640, 35619
- Area code: 256
- GNIS feature ID: 160222

Neel is an unincorporated community in western Morgan County, Alabama, United States. It is located south of Decatur and west of Hartselle at the 5-way stop intersection of Ironman Road, Danville Road, and Neel School Road. For statistical purposes, Neel is included within the Decatur Metropolitan Area which is, in turn, part of the Huntsville-Decatur Combined Statistical Area. A post office operated under the name Neel from 1890 to 1906. On November 29, 2016, an EF3 tornado destroyed several homes and businesses in the Neel community.
