= Caddo, Alabama =

Unincorporated community in Alabama, United States

- Unincorporated community
- Location within Alabama Location within the United States
- Coordinates: 34°34′09″N 87°08′24″W
- Country: United States
- State: Alabama
- County: Lawrence
- Elevation: 791 ft (241 m)
- Time zone: UTC-6 (Central (CST))
  - Summer (DST): UTC-5 (CDT)
- Area code: 256
- GNIS feature ID: 115355

Caddo is an unincorporated community along Alabama State Highway 24 between Decatur and Moulton in Lawrence County, Alabama, United States. Caddo is a feeder community or suburb of Decatur and is part of both the Decatur Metropolitan Area and the Huntsville-Decatur Combined Statistical Area. Movements to incorporate Caddo have been discussed since the 1980s.

== History ==
In 1976, the Lawrence County School System consolidated Midway School and Chalybeate School to form East Lawrence Elementary School, and in 1978 East Lawrence High School was established. The two schools were built in Caddo, a small community between Midway and Chalybeate. East Lawrence Middle School was later established in 1999. Since the creation of the East Lawrence School District in 1976, Caddo and the East Lawrence community has experienced steady growth. Due to the new growth and their close proximity, Caddo and Midway grew into one community. Today, most residents in Caddo and the East Lawrence community work and shop in nearby Decatur.

=== Incorporation ===
Movements to incorporate Caddo have been ongoing since the 1980s, culminating in a controversial petition and subsequent vote for incorporation in 2011; the movement for incorporation was defeated by a wide margin. Those in favor of incorporation argue that Caddo and the East Lawrence community would benefit from city taxes, TVA money, and city services. Many residents in Caddo also fear eventual annexation by the City of Decatur. Those against incorporation argue that residents do not want to be subjected to city ordinances or pay city taxes. Some residents also fear that incorporation would change their rural way of life.

== Elected officials ==
Caddo is represented by Senator Katie Britt (R-Montgomery), Senator Tommy Tuberville (R-Auburn), and Representative Dale Strong (R-Huntsville) at the federal level. At the state and local level, Caddo is represented by state Senator Paul Bussman (R-Cullman), state Representative Ken Johnson (R-Hillsboro), County Commissioner Joey Hargrove (D-Caddo), county school board member Reta Waldrep (R-Caddo), and county Superintendent of Education Jon Bret Smith (R-Moulton).

== Education ==
Caddo is home to the East Lawrence School District, a member of the Lawrence County School System. East Lawrence Elementary School (K-4), East Lawrence Middle School (5-8), and East Lawrence High School (9-12) make up the East Lawrence School District. East Lawrence High School is a class 4A school. East Lawrence is the home of the Eagles and its colors are black and gold.
