= Morgan City, Alabama =

Unincorporated community in Alabama, United States

- Unincorporated community
- Location within Alabama Location within the United States
- Coordinates: 34°28′19″N 86°34′11″W
- Country: United States
- State: Alabama
- County: Marshall & Morgan
- Elevation: 1,191 ft (363 m)
- Time zone: UTC-6 (Central (CST))
  - Summer (DST): UTC-5 (CDT)
- Area codes: 256 & 938
- GNIS feature ID: 123040

Morgan City, also known as New Rescue, is an unincorporated community located in Morgan and Marshall counties, Alabama, United States. It is included in the Huntsville-Decatur Combined Statistical Area, as well as the Decatur Metropolitan Area.

It is located atop Brindlee Mountain which is approximately halfway between Arab and Huntsville along U.S. 231. Morgan City houses many shops, ranging from a dental and animal clinic to an antique shop. A Fire station sits inside Morgan City known as Brindlee Mountain Volunteer Fire Department Station #1. Going south towards Arab, there is a bow repair shop as well as a carpet business. Brindlee Mountain Fire Apparatus sits inside Morgan City as well, but on the boundaries between Morgan City and Union Grove. Dollar General, a small drug store, a cafe, and Food 4 Less operate in a small strip mall in the area's limits. There also is 2 gas stations, a Rob Austin Alfa agency office, 4 churches, as well as several mechanic shops.

== School System ==
This area is part of the Morgan County School System. Union Hill School serves children from Kindergarten to eighth grade. Albert P. Brewer High School, located in Somerville, AL, serves high school aged children from the area.

== Newsome Sinks ==
In this area lies one of the region's densest areas of caves, known as the Newsome Sinks Karst Area. In a span of 50 acres it contains well over 30 documented caves and pits. It is designated by both the Southeastern Cave Conservancy Inc. and the National Speleological Society as off-limits due to endangered plant species growing in the area.
