= Lawrence County Schools =

School district in Alabama, United States

Lawrence County School District

Location
- 14131 Market St; Moulton, AL 35650 United States

District information
- NCES District ID: 0102040

Other information
- Website: Lawrence County School District

Lawrence County School District is a public school district based in Lawrence County, Alabama, headquartered in Moulton. Like many school districts in the United States, it is considered a separate government and has an entry in the U.S. Census Bureau's twice a decade census of governments. "Census of Governments" (CSV). U.S. Census Bureau.

== Schools ==
=== High Schools ===
- East Lawrence High School
- Hatton High School
- Lawrence County Center of Technology
- Lawrence County High School

=== Middle Schools ===
- East Lawrence Middle School
- Moulton Middle School

=== Elementary Schools ===
- East Lawrence Elementary School
- Hatton Elementary School
- Hazlewood Elementary School
- Moulton Elementary School
- Mt. Hope Elementary/Middle School
- Speake School

== Former Schools ==
=== Former High Schools ===
- R.A. Hubbard High School
