= R. A. Hubbard High School =

Coordinates: 34.6815°N 87.3097°W

Location
- 12905 Jessie Jackson Parkway; North Courtland, Alabama 35618; United States

Information
- Former names: Courtland High School

R. A. Hubbard High School was a public high school serving grades 7 to 12 in Lawrence County, Alabama. The school closed in 2021. The school's teams competed as the Chiefs and the school colors were black and orange. It was preceded by Courtland High School.

In 1962 its football team was established. In 1995, the Associated Press reported that six players on the football team were arrested after raping an intoxicated 14-year-old girl. In 2004 the school changed its name from Courtland. The football team won state championships in 1988, 1989, 1990, 1995, and 1999. The varsity girls basketball team won the 1A State Championship in 2017.

In 2019 it was listed as failing and threatened with closure by the Alabama Accountability Act. Community meetings were held and the NAACP called for investment in the school which serves a perdominantly African American student body. The failing grade was disputed with critics noting a high graduation rate and most graduates continuing on to higher education. The failing grade was determined by standardized test scores and results in students from the school being able to transfer to other schools in the area.
