= North Courtland, Alabama =

- Town
- Location of North Courtland in Lawrence County, Alabama
- Coordinates: 34°40′44″N 87°18′30″W
- Country: United States
- State: Alabama
- County: Lawrence

Area
  - Total: 0.67 sq mi (1.74 km^{2})
  - Land: 0.66 sq mi (1.72 km^{2})
  - Water: 0.0077 sq mi (0.02 km^{2})
- Elevation: 584 ft (178 m)

Population (2020)
  - Total: 483
  - Density: 729.3/sq mi (281.58/km^{2})
- Time zone: UTC-6 (Central (CST))
  - Summer (DST): UTC-5 (CDT)
- FIPS code: 01-55044
- GNIS feature ID: 2407004

North Courtland is a town in Lawrence County, Alabama, United States, and is included in the Decatur Metropolitan Area, as well as the Huntsville-Decatur Combined Statistical Area. It incorporated in 1981. As of the 2020 census, North Courtland had a population of 483. Along with Hillsboro, it is one of two majority black communities in Lawrence County out of its six populated communities as of 2010.

== Geography ==
According to the U.S. Census Bureau, the town has a total area of 0.5 square miles (1.3 km^{2}), all land.

== Demographics ==
Historical population
Census	Pop.	Note	%±
1990	973		—
2000	799		−17.9%
2010	632		−20.9%
2020	483		−23.6%
U.S. Decennial Census; 2013 Estimate

=== 2020 census ===
North Courtland town, Alabama – Racial and ethnic composition Note: the US Census treats Hispanic/Latino as an ethnic category. This table excludes Latinos from the racial categories and assigns them to a separate category. Hispanics/Latinos may be of any race.
Race / Ethnicity (NH = Non-Hispanic)	Pop 2010	Pop 2020	% 2010	% 2020
White alone (NH)	15	6	2.37%	1.24%
Black or African American alone (NH)	611	464	96.68%	96.07%
Native American or Alaska Native alone (NH)	0	0	0.00%	0.00%
Asian alone (NH)	0	0	0.00%	0.00%
Pacific Islander alone (NH)	0	0	0.00%	0.00%
Some Other Race alone (NH)	0	4	0.00%	0.83%
Mixed Race or Multi-Racial (NH)	6	7	0.95%	1.45%
Hispanic or Latino (any race)	0	2	0.00%	0.41%
Total	632	483	100.00%	100.00%

=== 2000 census ===
At the 2000 census, there were 799 people, 330 households and 206 families residing in the town. The population density was 1,535.9 inhabitants per square mile (593.0/km^{2}). There were 366 housing units at an average density of 703.6 per square mile (271.7/km^{2}). The racial makeup of the town was 2.38% White, 97.50% Black or African American and 0.13% Native American. 0.75% of the population were Hispanic or Latino of any race.

There were 330 households, of which 30.6% had children under the age of 18 living with them, 30.3% were married couples living together, 28.5% had a female householder with no husband present, and 37.3% were non-families. 34.5% of all households were made up of individuals, and 13.3% had someone living alone who was 65 years of age or older. The average household size was 2.42 and the average family size was 3.15.

29.0% of the population were under the age of 18, 10.8% from 18 to 24, 26.3% from 25 to 44, 21.7% from 45 to 64, and 12.3% who were 65 years of age or older. The median age was 33 years. For every 100 females, there were 75.2 males. For every 100 females age 18 and over, there were 72.3 males.

The median household income was $19,875 and the median family income was $26,250. Males had a median income of $25,938 compared with $21,058 for females. The per capita income for the town was $12,776. About 19.8% of families and 28.1% of the population were below the poverty line, including 32.6% of those under age 18 and 45.8% of those age 65 or over.
