= Chalybeate Springs, Alabama =

Unincorporated community in Alabama, United States

- Unincorporated community
- Location within Alabama Location within the United States
- Coordinates: 34°33′54″N 87°13′36″W
- Country: United States
- State: Alabama
- County: Lawrence
- Elevation: 781 ft (238 m)
- Time zone: UTC-6 (Central (CST))
  - Summer (DST): UTC-5 (CDT)
- Area codes: 256, 938
- GNIS feature ID: 115919

Chalybeate Springs (/ˌkliːbit spriːŋz/ CLEE-bit spreengz is an unincorporated community in Lawrence County, Alabama, United States.

== History ==
The community is named after the chalybeate springs found in the area. The community was formerly home to a hotel, where visitors would stay while using the springs.
