= Speake, Alabama =

Unincorporated community in Alabama, United States

- Unincorporated community
- Location within Alabama Location within the United States
- Coordinates: 34°24′57″N 87°10′03″W
- Country: United States
- State: Alabama
- County: Lawrence
- Elevation: 650 ft (200 m)
- Time zone: UTC-6 (Central (CST))
  - Summer (DST): UTC-5 (CDT)
- GNIS feature ID: 160652

Speake (formerly, Hodges Store) is an unincorporated community in Lawrence County, Alabama, United States.

== Notable people ==
- Lucas Black, actor; grew up and graduated high school in Speake.
- Jesse Owens, Olympic gold medalist; born in Speake/Oakville.
