= Wolf Springs, Alabama =

Unincorporated community in Alabama, United States

- Unincorporated community
- Location within Alabama Location within the United States
- Coordinates: 34°35′42″N 87°28′22″W
- Country: United States
- State: Alabama
- County: Lawrence
- Elevation: 689 ft (210 m)
- Time zone: UTC-6 (Central (CST))
  - Summer (DST): UTC-5 (CDT)
- Area codes: 256, 938
- GNIS feature ID: 154019

Wolf Springs is an unincorporated community in Lawrence County, Alabama, United States, located 12.5 miles (20.1 km) northwest of Moulton.

== History ==
A post office operated under the name Wolf Springs from 1848 to 1857. Wolf Springs School, located in Lawrence County Alabama, was built in 1936. Five acres of land were donated to build the school in order to consolidate Roden, Masterson, Oak Grove and Beaver Cross schools. The school was open about 25 years. After the school closed, students were sent to Hatton. The building was later used as a voting site and a community center where fall festivals, hunting field trials, and family reunions were held. It is currently empty and has been vandalized.
