= Somerville, Alabama =

- Town
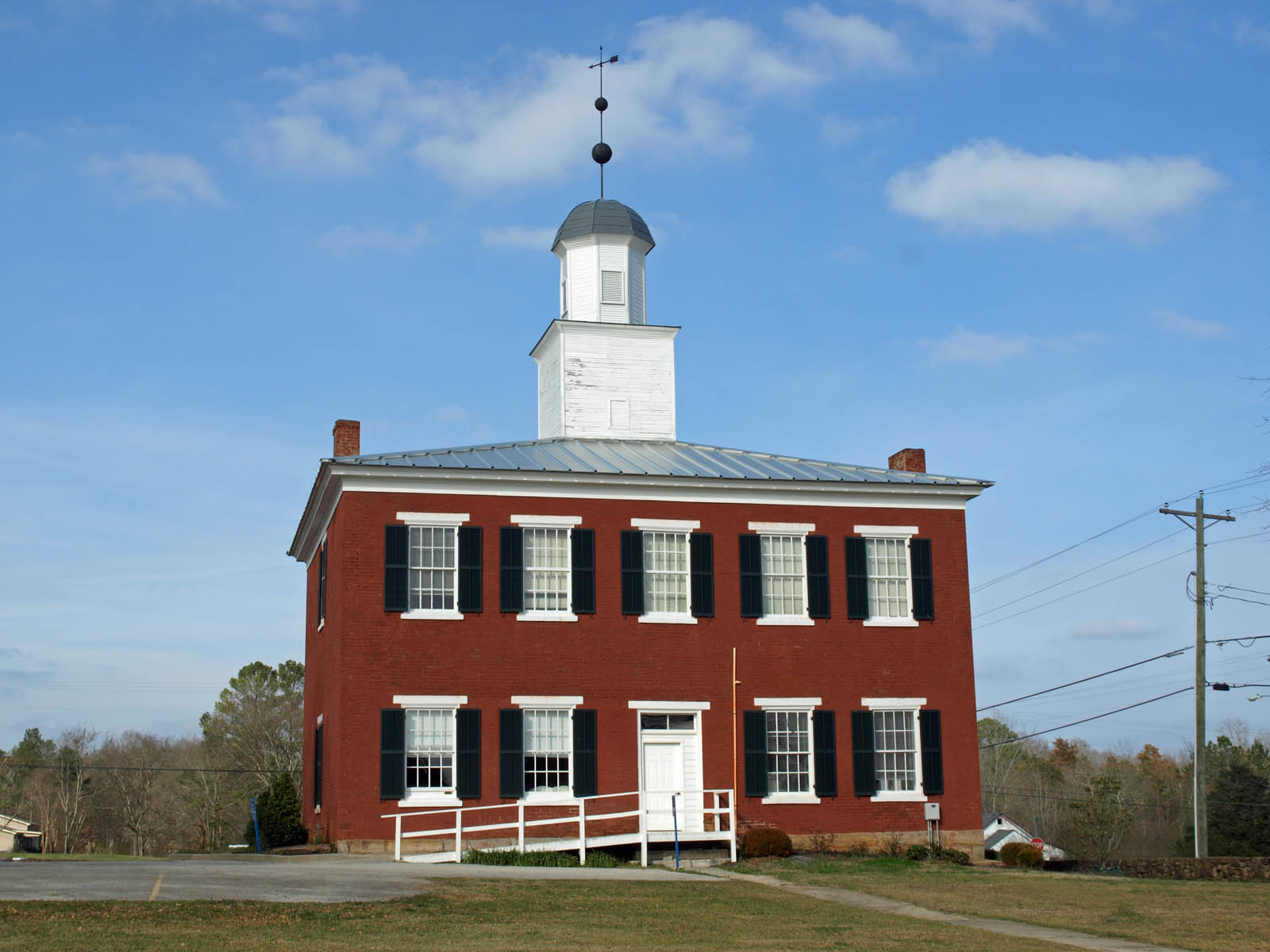
- The Somerville Courthouse was built in 1837 in the Federal style. It served as the county courthouse for Morgan County until the county seat was moved from Somerville to Decatur in 1891. It was listed on the National Register of Historic Places on March 24, 1972.

- Location in Morgan County, Alabama
- Coordinates: 34°28′12″N 86°47′56″W
- Country: United States
- State: Alabama
- County: Morgan
- Incorporated: December 3, 1819

Area
  - Total: 3.47 sq mi (8.98 km^{2})
  - Land: 3.46 sq mi (8.97 km^{2})
  - Water: 0.0039 sq mi (0.01 km^{2})
- Elevation: 604 ft (184 m)

Population (2020)
  - Total: 796
  - Density: 229.8/sq mi (88.74/km^{2})
- Time zone: UTC-6 (Central (CST))
  - Summer (DST): UTC-5 (CDT)
- ZIP code: 35670
- Area code: 256
- FIPS code: 01-71496
- GNIS feature ID: 2407365
- Website: www.townofsomerville.org

Somerville is a town in Morgan County, Alabama, United States. It is included in the Decatur Metropolitan Area and the Huntsville-Decatur Combined Statistical Area. As of the 2020 census, the population of the town was 796.

== History ==
Somerville was the county seat of Morgan County from 1818 to 1891, when the seat was moved to Decatur. The town was named for Robert M. Summerville, an officer killed in 1814 during the Creek War. Initially incorporated on December 3, 1819, it is a few days older than the state. After its loss of the county seat in the 1890s, its incorporation lapsed. It was reorganized (reincorporated) on December 1, 1955.

== Geography ==
Somerville is located in central Morgan County along Alabama State Route 67, which leads northwest 15 miles (24 km) to Decatur and southeast 18 miles (29 km) to the edge of Baileyton.

According to the U.S. Census Bureau, the town has a total area of 3.5 square miles (9.1 km^{2}), of which 0.005 square miles (3.2 acres), or 0.14%, are water.

Somerville is drained by Town Creek, which flows east to Cotaco Creek, a north-flowing tributary of the Tennessee River.

== Demographics ==
Historical population
Census	Pop.	Note	%±
1850	217		—
1870	115		—
1880	209		81.7%
1960	166		—
1970	185		11.4%
1980	140		−24.3%
1990	211		50.7%
2000	347		64.5%
2010	724		108.6%
2020	796		9.9%
U.S. Decennial Census; 2013 Estimate

As of the census of 2000, there were 347 people, 148 households, and 97 families residing in the town. The population density was 339.9 inhabitants per square mile (131.2/km^{2}). There were 160 housing units at an average density of 156.7 per square mile (60.5/km^{2}). The racial makeup of the town was 91.35% White, 5.76% Black or African American, 1.73% Native American, 0.29% from other races, and 0.86% from two or more races. 0.58% of the population were Hispanic or Latino of any race.

There were 148 households, out of which 28.4% had children under the age of 18 living with them, 51.4% were married couples living together, 11.5% had a female householder with no husband present, and 33.8% were non-families. 29.7% of all households were made up of individuals, and 8.8% had someone living alone who was 65 years of age or older. The average household size was 2.34 and the average family size was 2.92.

In the town, the population was spread out, with 22.5% under the age of 18, 11.2% from 18 to 24, 33.1% from 25 to 44, 22.5% from 45 to 64, and 10.7% who were 65 years of age or older. The median age was 36 years. For every 100 females, there were 94.9 males. For every 100 females age 18 and over, there were 103.8 males.

The median income for a household in the town was $26,250, and the median income for a family was $31,250. Males had a median income of $29,107 versus $18,958 for females. The per capita income for the town was $13,747. About 13.3% of families and 13.7% of the population were below the poverty line, including 11.0% of those under age 18 and 32.1% of those age 65 or over.

== Mayor and town council ==
Mayor

- Darren Tucker

Town Council

- Place 1: Rodger McClure
- Place 2: Ron Jones
- Place 3: Michael Rea
- Place 4: Carl Flemons
- Place 5: Jackie Teague

== Notable people ==
- Josiah Patterson, congressman from 1891 to 1897
- Malcolm R. Patterson, governor of Tennessee from 1907 to 1911
- Joseph Humphrey Sloss, congressman from 1871 to 1875
- Ryan Williams, theoretical computer scientist
- Gary Winton, former basketball player for the United States Military Academy
