= Rainbow, Alabama =

- Unincorporated community
- Location within Alabama Location within the United States
- Coordinates: 34°45′09″N 86°44′11″W
- Country: United States
- State: Alabama
- County: Madison
- Elevation: 784 ft (239 m)
- Time zone: UTC-6 (Central (CST))
  - Summer (DST): UTC-5 (CDT)
- Area code: 256
- GNIS feature ID: 125415

Rainbow is an unincorporated community in Madison County, Alabama, United States.

== History ==
A post office called Rainbow was established in 1901, and remained in operation until it was discontinued in 1904.
