= Youngtown, Alabama =

Unincorporated community in Alabama, United States

- Unincorporated community
- Location within Alabama Location within the United States
- Coordinates: 34°28′57″N 87°21′17″W
- Country: United States
- State: Alabama
- County: Lawrence
- Elevation: 673 ft (205 m)
- Time zone: UTC-6 (Central (CST))
  - Summer (DST): UTC-5 (CDT)
- Area codes: 256 & 938
- GNIS feature ID: 160876

Youngtown, also known as Young Town or Youngs Store, is an unincorporated community in Lawrence County, Alabama, United States.
