= Hulaco, Alabama =

- Unincorporated community
- Location within Alabama Location within the United States
- Coordinates: 34°18′44″N 86°35′55″W
- Country: United States
- State: Alabama
- County: Morgan
- Elevation: 1,063 ft (324 m)
- Time zone: UTC-6 (Central (CST))
  - Summer (DST): UTC-5 (CDT)
- Area code: 256
- GNIS feature ID: 120540

Hulaco is an unincorporated community located in extreme southeastern Morgan County, Alabama, United States, and is included in the Decatur Metropolitan Area, as well as the Huntsville-Decatur Combined Statistical Area. A post office operated under the name Hulaco from 1885 to 1904
