= Landersville, Alabama =

Unincorporated community in Alabama, United States

- Unincorporated community
- Location within Alabama Location within the United States
- Coordinates: 34°28′08″N 87°24′03″W
- Country: United States
- State: Alabama
- County: Lawrence
- Elevation: 650 ft (200 m)
- Time zone: UTC-6 (Central (CST))
  - Summer (DST): UTC-5 (CDT)
- Area codes: 256, 938
- GNIS feature ID: 159910

Landersville is an unincorporated community in Lawrence County, Alabama, United States, located 6.2 miles (10.0 km) west of Moulton.

== History ==
The community is named for John Landers, who lived in the area. A post office operated under the name Landersville from 1851 to 1959.

== Demographics ==
Historical population
Census	Pop.	Note	%±
1880	67		—
U.S. Decennial Census

Landersville was listed on the 1880 U.S. Census as an unincorporated community of 67 residents. It was the only time it has been listed on the census rolls.
