= Loosier, Alabama =

Unincorporated community in Alabama, United States

- Unincorporated community
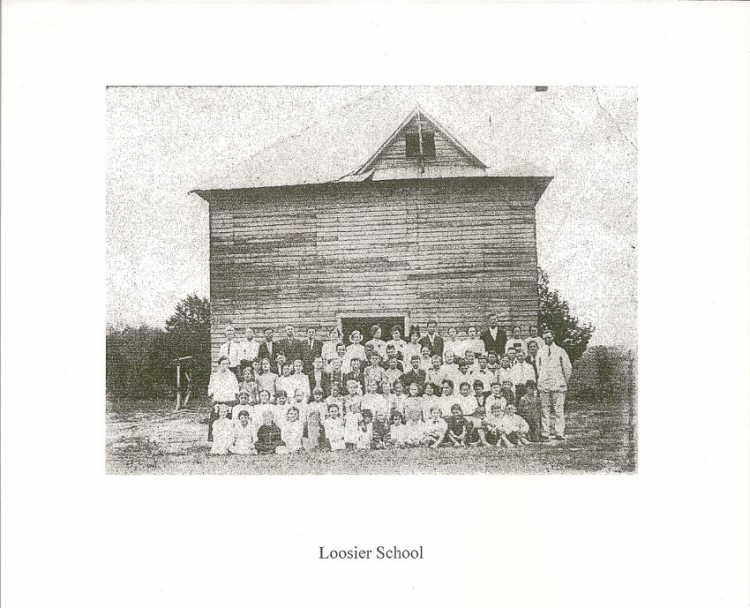
- The first School in Loosier, Alabama

- Location within Alabama Location within the United States
- Coordinates: 34°34′18″N 87°22′13″W
- Country: United States
- State: Alabama
- County: Lawrence
- Elevation: 748 ft (228 m)
- Time zone: UTC-6 (Central (CST))
  - Summer (DST): UTC-5 (CDT)
- Area codes: 256, 938
- GNIS feature ID: 136783

Loosier is an unincorporated community in Lawrence County, Alabama, United States. Loosier is located immediately off Alabama State Route 157, 7.6 miles (12.2 km) northwest of Moulton. Loosier is presented on the Masterson Mill U.S. Geological Survey Map.

It is at elevation 228m.

== History ==
A post office operated under the name Loosier from 1901 to 1902. The town was founded between 1860-1870 by Civil War Veteran Thomas Jefferson Loosier. In 1917 the town had 1 Grain Mill, 1 Saw Mill, 2 Churches, 1 School, 1 Store, and 1 Post Office
