= Oakville, Alabama =

Unincorporated community in Alabama, United States

- Unincorporated community
- Location within Alabama Location within the United States
- Coordinates: 34°26′43″N 87°09′44″W
- Country: United States
- State: Alabama
- County: Lawrence
- Elevation: 640 ft (200 m)
- Time zone: UTC-6 (Central (CST))
  - Summer (DST): UTC-5 (CDT)
- Area code: 256
- GNIS feature ID: 160286

Oakville Indian Mounds and Cemetery
- Interactive map of Oakville Indian Mounds and Cemetery

Alabama Register of Landmarks and Heritage
- Official name: Oakville Indian Mounds and Cemetery
- Designated: May 3, 2001

Oakville is an unincorporated community located in the southeast corner of Lawrence County, Alabama, United States. The community has two parks.

The Jesse Owens museum was opened in 1996. Owens was born and spent the majority of his childhood in the community before his family moved to Cleveland, Ohio. The Jesse Owens Memorial Park and Museum is at the intersection of county roads 203 and 187.

== Oakville Indian Mounds Park and Museum ==
The Oakville Indian Mounds Park and Museum is an 83-acre (340,000 m^{2}) state park dedicated to ancient Native American monuments and the historic Cherokee nation of the Southeast. It preserves twenty 2,000-year-old mounds built by Middle Woodland-era (1-500 CE) prehistoric indigenous peoples. The Copena culture developed out of the Hopewell tradition. They were named for their distinctive use of copper and galena, a lead ore mineral. The most significant earthworks are a burial mound and the Copena Ceremonial Mound, the largest ceremonial mound surviving in present-day Alabama. The latter is 27 feet (8.2 m) high, with a base of 1.8 acres (7,300 m^{2}). The platform top has an area of 1-acre (4,000 m^{2}). The Copena culture developed from the complex Hopewell tradition, whose people had a wide regional trading network across the continent.

The state museum is designed in the style of a Cherokee council house, as these were the dominant indigenous people of the area at the time of European encounter. It provides exhibits on the Copena culture, displaying more than 1000 archeological artifacts that were excavated on site. It also includes material on the historic Cherokee nation, whose people had migrated to the area and inhabited it by the time of European encounter in the 17th century. They are not descendants of the Copena culture but are believed to have migrated south from the Great Lakes area in ancient times.

In addition, the museum includes a display explaining the history of the so-called "Black-Dutch" people of the area, mixed-race descendants of European and Cherokee who stayed in the area after Indian Removal in the nineteenth century. They generally identified as Cherokee but tried to avoid discrimination by calling themselves "Black Dutch". Since the mid-twentieth century, they have reclaimed their Cherokee ancestry and, according to the display, four thousand people are now enrolled as members of the state-recognized Echota Cherokee Tribe of Alabama.

The grounds of the museum include part of the Black Warriors’ Path, an Indian major trading route which goes past the mounds. Beginning in Cullman County, Alabama, it passes through the state and was long used by Native Americans. Later, British-American pioneers called it Mitchell Trace.

The park hosted the Amateur Athletic Union (AAU) Cross Country National Junior Olympics in 2008 and 2015. It has hosted the AHSAA XC Championships since 2002.

The park also has a lake and fishing pier. The street address for the park is 1219 County Rd. 187, Danville, Alabama, 35619.
