= Lawrence County, Alabama =

County in Alabama, United States

- County
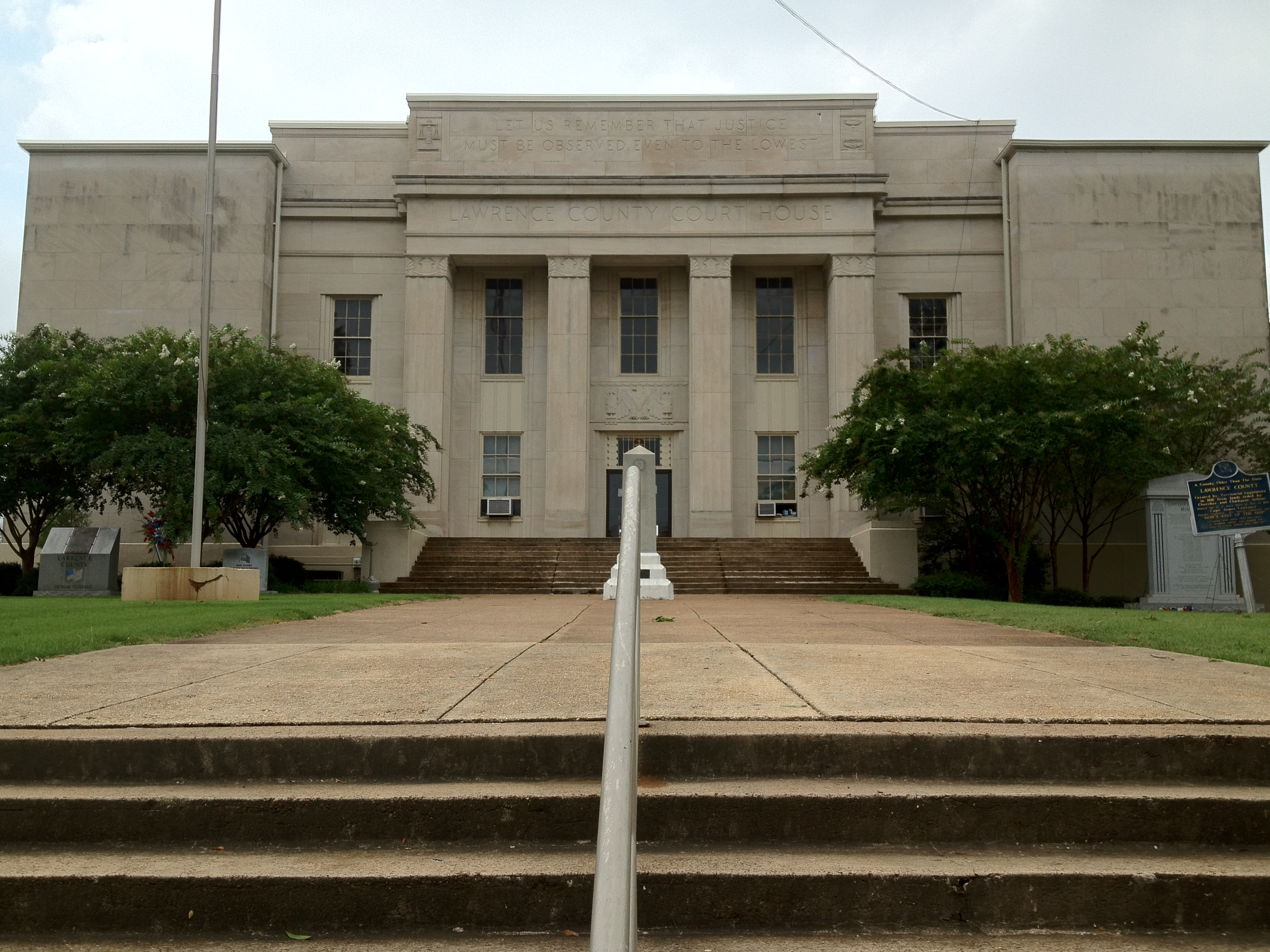
- Lawrence County Courthouse in Moulton

- Location within the U.S. state of Alabama
- Coordinates: 34°31′17″N 87°18′37″W
- Country: United States
- State: Alabama
- Founded: February 6, 1818
- Named for: James Lawrence
- Seat: Moulton
- Largest city: Moulton

Area
  - Total: 717 sq mi (1,860 km^{2})
  - Land: 691 sq mi (1,790 km^{2})
  - Water: 27 sq mi (70 km^{2}) 3.7%

Population (2020)
  - Total: 33,073
  - Estimate (2025): 33,843 ▲
  - Density: 47.9/sq mi (18.5/km^{2})
- Time zone: UTC−6 (Central)
  - Summer (DST): UTC−5 (CDT)
- Congressional district: 4th
- Website: www.lawrencealabama.com
- County Number 42 on Alabama Licence Plates

Lawrence County is a county in the northern part of the U.S. state of Alabama. As of the 2020 census, the population was 33,073. The county seat is Moulton. The county was named after James Lawrence, a captain in the United States Navy from New Jersey.

Lawrence County is included in the Decatur, Alabama Metropolitan Area, which is also included in the Huntsville–Decatur-Albertville combined statistical area.

== History ==
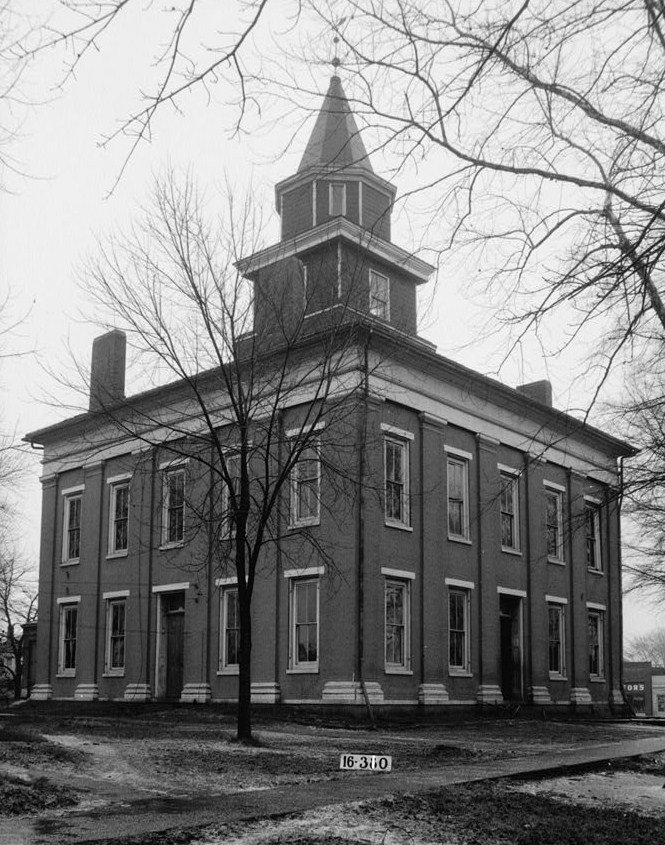
Old Lawrence County Courthouse

For thousands of years, this area was inhabited by differing cultures of indigenous peoples. People of the Copena culture in the Middle Woodland period (1–500 CE) built complex earthworks as part of their religious and political system. Their burial mound and ceremonial platform mound, the largest in the state, are preserved at Oakville Indian Mounds Park and Museum. The museum includes exhibits on the Cherokee, an Iroquoian-speaking people who inhabited the area at the time of European encounter. Other historic Native American tribes in this state were Choctaw and Creek, who both spoke Muskogean languages.

Lawrence County was established by the legislature of the Alabama Territory on February 6, 1818. Under the Indian Removal Act of 1830, the U.S. government forced most of the members of these Southeast tribes to go west of the Mississippi River to Indian Territory to the west. They wanted to extinguish their land claims to open the area to settlement by Americans.

Numerous Cherokee and mixed-race European-Cherokee descendants, sometimes called "Black Dutch", have stayed in the Lawrence County area. According to the census, the county has the highest number of self-identified Native Americans in the state. The state-recognized Echota Cherokee Tribe of Alabama has their Blue Clan in this county with 4,000 enrolled members.

== Geography ==
According to the United States Census Bureau, the county has a total area of 717 square miles (1,860 km^{2}), of which 691 square miles (1,790 km^{2}) is land and 27 square miles (70 km^{2}) (3.7%) is water.

=== River ===
- Tennessee River
- Sipsey Fork of the Black Warrior River

=== Adjacent counties ===
- Limestone County (northeast)
- Morgan County (east)
- Cullman County (southeast)
- Winston County (south)
- Franklin County (west)
- Colbert County (west)
- Lauderdale County (northwest)

=== National protected area ===
- William B. Bankhead National Forest (part)

== Transportation ==
=== Major highways ===
- U.S. Highway 72 Alternate / Alabama 20
- Alabama 24
- Alabama 33
- Alabama 36
- Alabama 101
- Alabama 157
- Alabama 184

=== Rail ===
- Norfolk Southern Railway

== Demographics ==
Historical population
Census	Pop.	Note	%±
1820	8,652		—
1830	14,984		73.2%
1840	13,313		−11.2%
1850	15,258		14.6%
1860	13,975		−8.4%
1870	16,658		19.2%
1880	21,392		28.4%
1890	20,725		−3.1%
1900	20,124		−2.9%
1910	21,984		9.2%
1920	24,307		10.6%
1930	26,942		10.8%
1940	27,880		3.5%
1950	27,128		−2.7%
1960	24,501		−9.7%
1970	27,281		11.3%
1980	30,170		10.6%
1990	31,513		4.5%
2000	34,803		10.4%
2010	34,339		−1.3%
2020	33,073		−3.7%
2025 (est.)	33,843	▲	2.3%
U.S. Decennial Census; 1790–1960 1900–1990; 1990–2000 2010–2020

=== 2020 census ===
As of the 2020 census, the county had a population of 33,073. The median age was 43.4 years. 21.8% of residents were under the age of 18 and 19.0% of residents were 65 years of age or older. For every 100 females there were 95.9 males, and for every 100 females age 18 and over there were 93.5 males age 18 and over.

0.0% of residents lived in urban areas, while 100.0% lived in rural areas.

There were 13,517 households in the county, of which 28.9% had children under the age of 18 living with them and 26.6% had a female householder with no spouse or partner present. About 27.7% of all households were made up of individuals and 12.9% had someone living alone who was 65 years of age or older.

There were 15,225 housing units, of which 11.2% were vacant. Among occupied housing units, 79.3% were owner-occupied and 20.7% were renter-occupied. The homeowner vacancy rate was 1.0% and the rental vacancy rate was 7.7%.

=== Racial and ethnic composition ===
Lawrence County, Alabama – Racial and ethnic composition Note: the US Census treats Hispanic/Latino as an ethnic category. This table excludes Latinos from the racial categories and assigns them to a separate category. Hispanics/Latinos may be of any race.
Race / Ethnicity (NH = Non-Hispanic)	Pop 2000	Pop 2010	Pop 2020	% 2000	% 2010	% 2020
White alone (NH)	26,899	26,420	24,714	77.29%	76.94%	74.73%
Black or African American alone (NH)	4,613	3,917	3,302	13.25%	11.41%	9.98%
Native American or Alaska Native alone (NH)	1,839	1,928	1,440	5.28%	5.61%	4.35%
Asian alone (NH)	33	41	84	0.09%	0.12%	0.25%
Pacific Islander alone (NH)	3	5	7	0.01%	0.01%	0.02%
Other race alone (NH)	3	25	69	0.01%	0.07%	0.21%
Mixed race or Multiracial (NH)	1,046	1,429	2,562	3.01%	4.16%	7.75%
Hispanic or Latino (any race)	367	574	895	1.05%	1.67%	2.71%
Total	34,803	34,339	33,073	100.00%	100.00%	100.00%

=== 2010 census ===
As of the census of 2010, there were 34,339 people, 13,654 households, and 9,985 families living in the county. The population density was 50 people per square mile (19 people/km^{2}). There were 15,229 housing units at an average density of 22 units per square mile (8.5 units/km^{2}). The racial makeup of the county was 77.6% White, 11.5% Black or African American, 5.7% Native American, 0.1% Asian, 0.0% Pacific Islander, 0.8% from other races, and 4.3% from two or more races. 1.7% of the population were Hispanic or Latino of any race. Of the 13,654 households 29.4% had children under the age of 18 living with them, 55.7% were married couples living together, 12.6% had a female householder with no husband present, and 26.9% were non-families. 24.2% of households were one person and 10.2% were one person aged 65 or older. The average household size was 2.50 and the average family size was 2.95.

The age distribution was 23.2% under the age of 18, 8.4% from 18 to 24, 24.8% from 25 to 44, 29.1% from 45 to 64, and 14.6% 65 or older. The median age was 40.6 years. For every 100 females, there were 95.7 males. For every 100 females age 18 and over, there were 97.4 males.

The median household income was $40,516 and the median family income was $48,425. Males had a median income of $45,787 versus $27,341 for females. The per capita income for the county was $19,370. About 10.3% of families and 13.6% of the population were below the poverty line, including 17.3% of those under age 18 and 11.0% of those age 65 or over.

=== 2000 census ===
As of the census of 2000, there were 34,803 people, 13,538 households, and 10,194 families living in the county. The population density was 50 people per square mile (19 people/km^{2}). There were 15,009 housing units at an average density of 22 units per square mile (8.5 units/km^{2}). The racial makeup of the county was 77.77% White, 13.36% Black or African American, 5.36% Native American, 0.10% Asian, 0.01% Pacific Islander, 0.33% from other races, and 3.08% from two or more races. 1.05% of the population were Hispanic or Latino of any race. In 2000, the largest ancestry groups in Lawrence County were English 61.2%, African 13.36%, Irish 4.1% and Welsh 2.0%.

Of the 13,538 households 34.70% had children under the age of 18 living with them, 60.50% were married couples living together, 11.20% had a female householder with no husband present, and 24.70% were non-families. 22.60% of households were one person and 9.50% were one person aged 65 or older. The average household size was 2.55 and the average family size was 2.99.

The age distribution was 25.70% under the age of 18, 8.40% from 18 to 24, 30.10% from 25 to 44, 23.70% from 45 to 64, and 12.10% 65 or older. The median age was 36 years. For every 100 females, there were 96.20 males. For every 100 females age 18 and over, there were 92.40 males.

The median household income was $31,549 and the median family income was $38,565. Males had a median income of $31,519 versus $20,480 for females. The per capita income for the county was $16,515. About 13.10% of families and 15.30% of the population were below the poverty line, including 16.80% of those under age 18 and 24.50% of those age 65 or over.

== Education ==
Every Public school in the County is part of the Lawrence County School District. Lawrence County is home to three high schools: East Lawrence, Hatton, and Lawrence County High Schools . Lawrence County also has six elementary schools: East Lawrence, Hatton, Hazlewood, Moulton, Mt. Hope, and Speake. Also Lawrence County has two middle schools: East Lawrence and Moulton. Other educational facilities include the Lawrence County Center of Technology and the Judy Jester Learning Center.

Former schools are R.A. Hubbard High School which was closed in 2022.

Speake, Mt. Hope and Hazlewood were demoted to elementary schools in 2009.

== Government ==
Lawrence County is reliably Republican at the presidential level. The last Democrat to win the county in a presidential election was Al Gore in 2000.

United States presidential election results for Lawrence County, Alabama
Year	Republican		Democratic		Third party(ies)	
Year	No.	%	No.	%	No.	%
1904	410	30.73%	909	68.14%	15	1.12%
1908	344	34.82%	602	60.93%	42	4.25%
1912	198	17.46%	643	56.70%	293	25.84%
1916	43	3.71%	995	85.92%	120	10.36%
1920	831	46.63%	935	52.47%	16	0.90%
1924	468	31.79%	990	67.26%	14	0.95%
1928	1,008	49.27%	1,035	50.59%	3	0.15%
1932	299	13.47%	1,920	86.53%	0	0.00%
1936	444	16.67%	2,213	83.10%	6	0.23%
1940	480	17.33%	2,277	82.23%	12	0.43%
1944	565	22.94%	1,893	76.86%	5	0.20%
1948	357	19.77%	0	0.00%	1,449	80.23%
1952	809	23.34%	2,651	76.49%	6	0.17%
1956	1,197	28.60%	2,961	70.75%	27	0.65%
1960	1,365	31.74%	2,929	68.10%	7	0.16%
1964	1,809	50.01%	0	0.00%	1,808	49.99%
1968	580	7.70%	650	8.63%	6,299	83.66%
1972	4,433	75.61%	1,416	24.15%	14	0.24%
1976	1,415	17.08%	6,810	82.21%	59	0.71%
1980	2,456	28.09%	6,112	69.92%	174	1.99%
1984	4,867	51.26%	4,465	47.03%	162	1.71%
1988	3,616	42.96%	4,646	55.20%	155	1.84%
1992	3,576	30.86%	6,364	54.91%	1,649	14.23%
1996	3,893	38.38%	5,254	51.80%	996	9.82%
2000	5,671	46.54%	6,296	51.67%	218	1.79%
2004	7,730	55.21%	6,155	43.96%	116	0.83%
2008	9,277	63.19%	5,164	35.18%	239	1.63%
2012	8,874	62.72%	5,069	35.83%	205	1.45%
2016	10,833	73.05%	3,627	24.46%	369	2.49%
2020	12,322	76.86%	3,562	22.22%	147	0.92%
2024	13,024	80.78%	2,983	18.50%	115	0.71%

United States Senate election results for Lawrence County, Alabama2
Year	Republican		Democratic		Third party(ies)	
Year	No.	%	No.	%	No.	%
2020	11,710	79.52%	2,983	20.26%	33	0.22%

United States Senate election results for Lawrence County, Alabama3
Year	Republican		Democratic		Third party(ies)	
Year	No.	%	No.	%	No.	%
2022	8,573	79.91%	1,916	17.86%	239	2.23%

Alabama Gubernatorial election results for Lawrence County
Year	Republican		Democratic		Third party(ies)	
Year	No.	%	No.	%	No.	%
2022	8,629	79.91%	1,707	15.81%	462	4.28%

== Communities ==
=== Cities ===
- Moulton (county seat)

=== Towns ===
- Courtland
- Hillsboro
- North Courtland
- Town Creek

=== Census Designated Places ===
- Hatton

=== Unincorporated communities ===
- Caddo
- Chalybeate Springs
- Landersville
- Loosier
- Mount Hope
- Muck City
- Oakville
- Pittsburg
- Speake
- Wheeler
- Wolf Springs
- Wren
- Youngtown

== Places of interest ==
Lawrence County is home to part of the William B. Bankhead National Forest, Oakville Indian Mounds, Jesse Owens Memorial Park, and Pond Spring, the General Joe Wheeler Home. The Black Warrior Path, which starts in Cullman County, runs through this county and passes the Oakville Indian Mounds. It was used by Native Americans for hundreds of years, and was later used by pioneer settlers.

== Events ==
Every year, Lawrence County hosts numerous events, including the AHSAA Cross Country state championships at the Oakville Indian Mounds, the Alabama Multicultural Indian Festival at the Oakville Indian Mounds, the Strawberry Festival in Moulton, and General Joe Wheeler's Birthday Party at Pond Spring in Courtland. The cities of Moulton and Courtland each celebrate Christmas on the Square during the month of December.

== See also ==
- National Register of Historic Places listings in Lawrence County, Alabama
- Properties on the Alabama Register of Landmarks and Heritage in Lawrence County, Alabama
- Water contamination in Lawrence and Morgan Counties, Alabama
