= Muck City, Alabama =

Unincorporated community in Alabama, United States

Monk City, Alabama
- Unincorporated community
- Location within Alabama Location within the United States
- Coordinates: 34°28′57″N 87°21′17″W
- Country: United States
- State: Alabama
- County: Lawrence
- Elevation: 627 ft (191 m)
- Time zone: UTC-6 (Central (CST))
  - Summer (DST): UTC-5 (CDT)
- Area codes: 256 & 938

Monk City is an unincorporated community in Lawrence County, Alabama, United States.
