= Pittsburg, Alabama =

Unincorporated community in Alabama, United States

- Unincorporated community
- Location within Alabama Location within the United States
- Coordinates: 34°31′31″N 87°12′21″W
- Country: United States
- State: Alabama
- County: Lawrence
- Elevation: 682 ft (208 m)
- Time zone: UTC-6 (Central (CST))
  - Summer (DST): UTC-5 (CDT)
- Area code: 256
- GNIS feature ID: 136802

Pittsburg is a community in Lawrence County, Alabama, United States. It has a latitude of 34.52528 and a longitude of -87.20583. Its elevation is 670 feet (200 m).c The community was named after the industrial heritage of Pittsburgh, Pennsylvania.
