= Woodland Mills, Alabama =

- Unincorporated community
- Location within Alabama Location within the United States
- Coordinates: 34°28′27″N 86°41′41″W
- Country: United States
- State: Alabama
- County: Morgan
- Elevation: 620 ft (190 m)
- Time zone: UTC-6 (Central (CST))
  - Summer (DST): UTC-5 (CDT)
- Area code: 256
- GNIS feature ID: 154026

Woodland Mills, also known as Cotaco /koʊˈteɪkoʊ/ , is an unincorporated community in Morgan County, Alabama, United States.

== History ==
The community was originally known as Cotaco, named after nearby Cotaco Creek. Cotaco Creek also loaned its name to Cotaco County, which was the original name of Morgan County. The name Cotaco is possibly derived from the Cherokee words ikati meaning "swamp" and kunahita meaning "long". A school was formerly opened in Woodland Mills.

A post office operated under the name Cotaco from 1883 to 1904 and under the name Woodland Mills from 1874 to 1909.
