= Ryan Crossroads, Alabama =

- Unincorporated community
- Location within Alabama Location within the United States
- Coordinates: 34°20′31″N 86°36′37″W
- Country: United States
- State: Alabama
- County: Morgan
- Elevation: 1,079 ft (329 m)
- Time zone: UTC-6 (Central (CST))
  - Summer (DST): UTC-5 (CDT)
- Area code: 256
- GNIS feature ID: 153235

Ryan Crossroads (also known as Ryans Crossroads) is an unincorporated community in Morgan County, Alabama, United States. A post office operated under the name Ryan from 1898 to 1905.
