= Port of Decatur =

Coordinates: 34.619°N 86.986°W

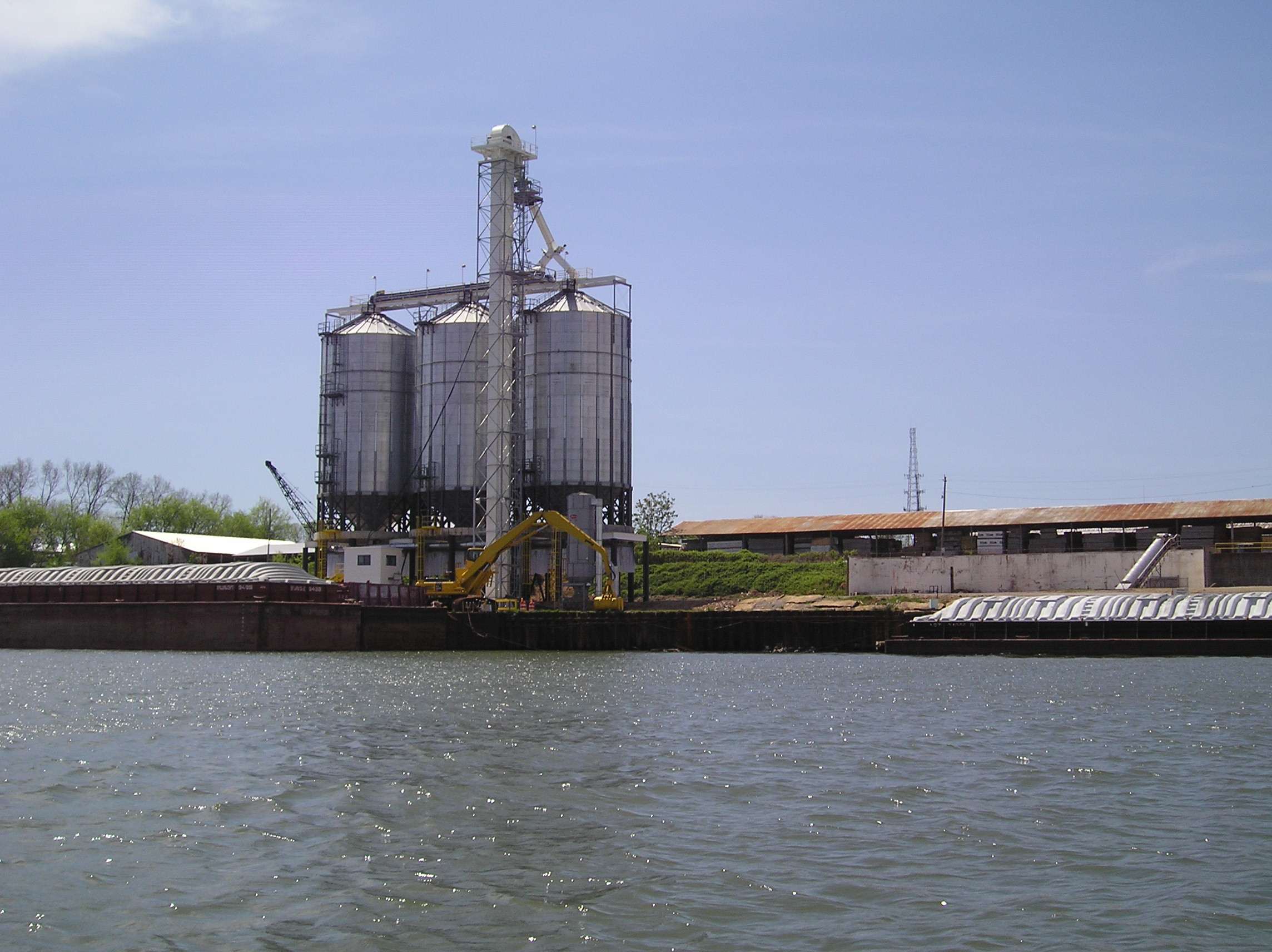
Bunge North America bulk liquid storage facilities at the port.

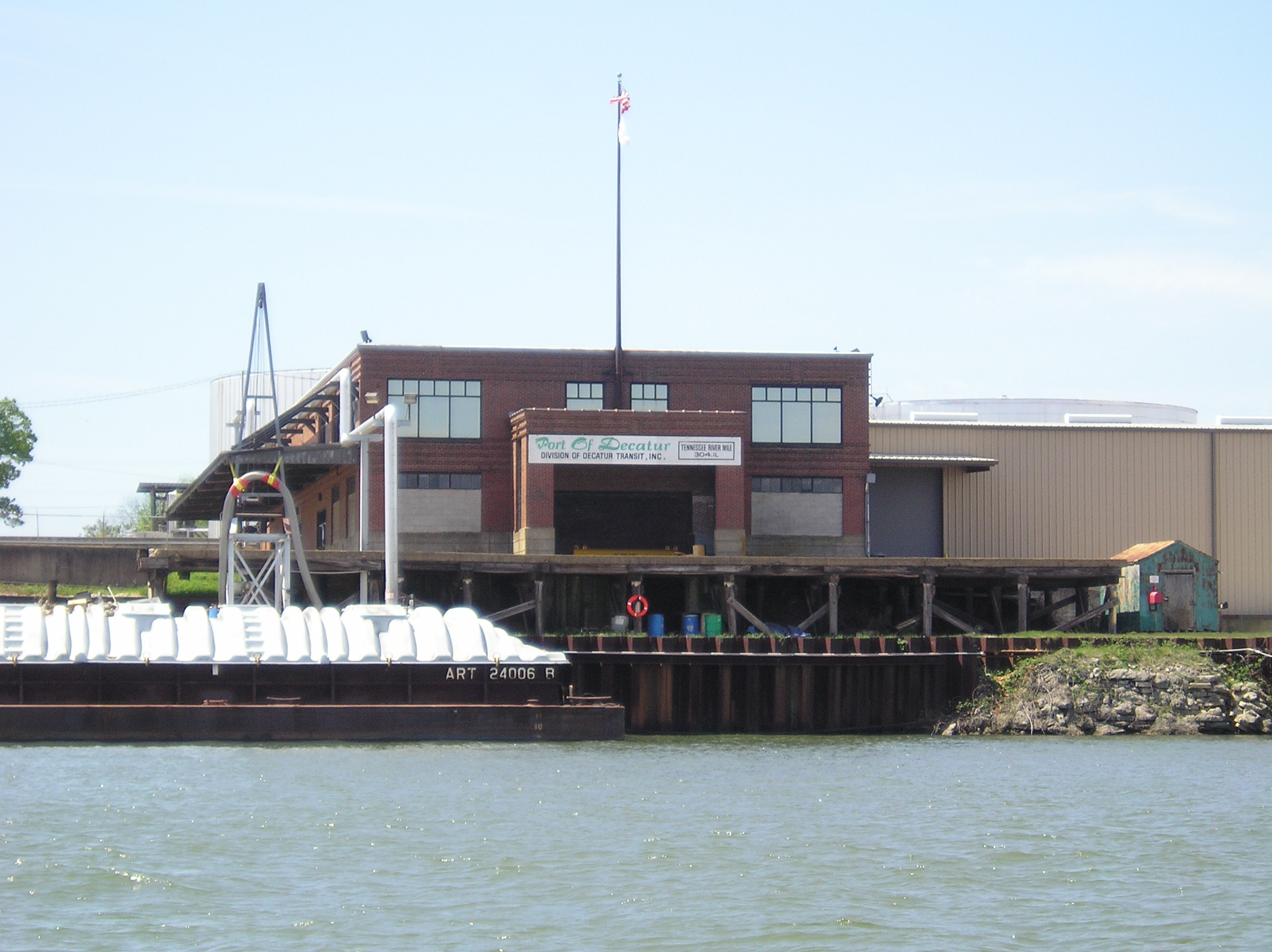
The main river entrance to the port.

The Port of Decatur is a transshipment port on the Tennessee River, in the city of Decatur, Alabama, United States of America. The port was founded in 1971. It is privately owned by Parker Towing, Inc., which owns and operates ports in Alabama and neighboring states.

== Port facilities ==
Port facilities include intermodal transfer points for switches between barge, road and rail, storage facilities for bulk liquids, dry bulk and general cargo and 12 acres (49,000 m^{2}) of open storage. Serviceable quay length is 2,000 feet (610 m), with a year-round draft of nine metres.

The port is directly connected to the Norfolk Southern and CSX railroads and to interstate and regional highway networks.

== Industries ==
Port throughput is dominated by imports of industrial and agricultural commodities including sand, asphalt, grains and fertilizers, coal, and steel piping. From 2005 the port also began handling poultry feed products for nationwide poultry firm Golden Kist.

Exports are limited by the cost-efficiency of road and rail distribution networks, forcing many barges accessing the port to return empty. Shipping times to New Orleans are approximately two weeks from loading.

== See also ==
- Decatur, Alabama
- List of ports in the United States
