= Wheeler Lake =

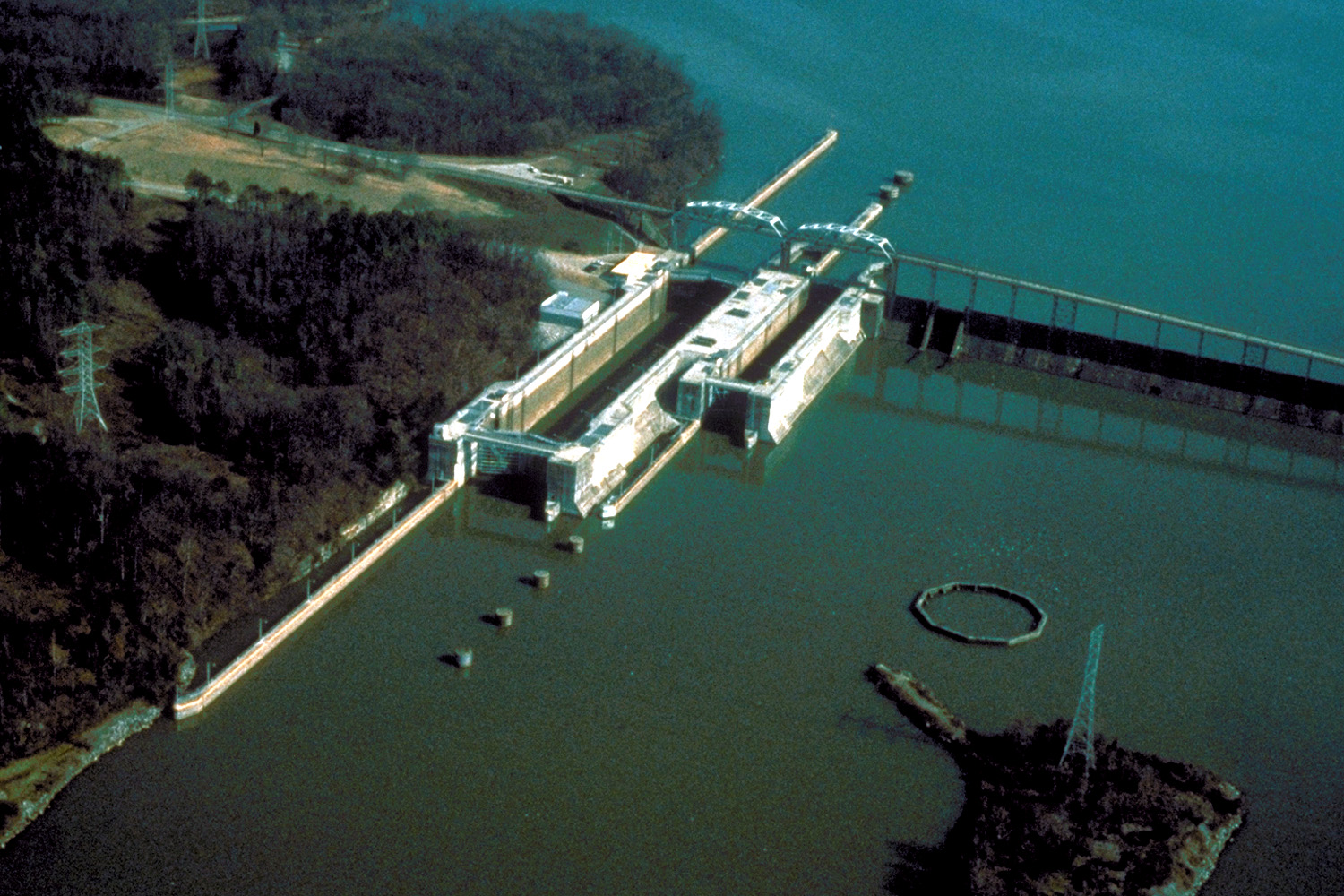
- Wheeler Lock and Dam, impounding Wheeler Lake on the Tennessee River

- Location within Alabama Location within the United States
- Location: north Alabama
- Coordinates: 34°48′30″N 087°23′00″W
- Lake type: reservoir
- Basin countries: United States
- Surface elevation: 179 m (587 ft)

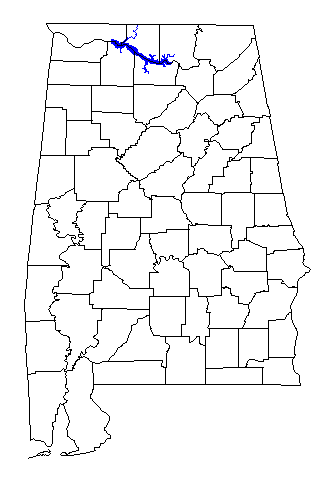
Wheeler Lake area

Wheeler Lake is located in the northern part of the state of Alabama in the United States, between Rogersville and Huntsville. Created by Wheeler Dam along the Tennessee River, it stretches 60 miles (97 km) from Wheeler Dam to Guntersville Dam. It is Alabama's second largest lake at 68,300 acres (276 km^{2}), only a few hundred acres smaller than Alabama's Guntersville Lake, which is 69,100 acres (280 km^{2}) and is separated by the Guntersville dam from the lake.

Decatur operates the busiest port along the Tennessee River on this lake, Port of Decatur.

Wheeler Lake is a major recreation and tourist center, attracting about four million visits a year. Along with camping, boating, and fishing, visitors enjoy the Wheeler National Wildlife Refuge several miles upstream from the dam.

The lake and dam are named for General Joseph "Joe" Wheeler.

== See also ==
- Dams and reservoirs of the Tennessee River
- List of Alabama dams and reservoirs
