= List of United States tornadoes in 1952 =

This page documents all U.S. tornadoes confirmed in 1952. Due to lack of modern radar and storm spotters, tornado counts from this period are much lower than what we see today.

== United States yearly total ==
Confirmed tornadoes by Fujita rating
FU	F0	F1	F2	F3	F4	F5	Total
0	32	82	72	36	18	0	240

== February ==
=== February 13 event ===
Color/symbol key
Color / symbol	Description
†	Data from Grazulis 1990/1993/2001b
¶	Data from a local National Weather Service office
※	Data from the 1952 Climatological Data National Summary publication
‡	Data from the NCEI database
♯	Maximum width of tornado
±	Tornado was rated below F2 intensity by Grazulis but a specific rating is unavailable.

List of confirmed tornadoes in the tornado outbreak of February 13, 1952
F#	Location	County / Parish	State	Start Coord. (Note: All starting coordinates are based on the NCEI database and may not reflect contemporary analyses)	Time (UTC) (Note: All dates are based on the local time zone where the tornado touched down; however, all times are in Coordinated Universal Time and dates are split at midnight CST/CDT for consistency.)	Path length	Width (Note: The listed width values are primarily the average/mean width of the tornadoes, with those having known maximum widths denoted by ♯. From 1952 to 1994, reports largely list mean width whereas contemporary years list maximum width. Values provided by Grazulis are the average width, with estimates being rounded down (i.e. 0.5 mi (0.80 km) is rounded down from 880 yards to 800 yards.)	Damage
F0	Northern Rodessa	Caddo	Louisiana	32.98°N 94.00°W	10:00–?	1 mi (1.6 km)‡	133 yd (122 m)‡	$25,000
F0	This tornado may have started in McLeod, Texas. A barn was shifted off its foundation, a garage lost a wall, and a trio of oil rigs were toppled. Lightning from the storm also burned down a home.							
F3†	N of Buckeye†	Mississippi	Arkansas	35.95°N 90.15°W	22:53–?†	0.3 mi (0.48 km)‡	33 yd (30 m)‡	Unknown
F3†	This short-lived, intense tornado obliterated a five-room home, debris of which was found 3 mi (4.8 km) away. The tornado also unroofed a home nearby and wrecked many outbuildings. All five injuries, two of which were serious, came from one family, but no damage estimate was given. The funnel cloud from this storm was seen in Manila and passed east-northeast of Leachville.							
F2	S of Camden	Benton	Tennessee	36.00°N 88.12°W	23:00–?†	1 mi (1.6 km)†	300 yd (270 m)	$20,000†
F2	This small-but-strong tornado damaged or destroyed nine homes and half a dozen other structures, affecting a total of nine families.							
F2	NW of Holland to Denton to E of Braggadocio	Pemiscot	Missouri	36.07°N 89.93°W	23:10–?	6 mi (9.7 km)†	100 yd (91 m)	$3,000※
F2	This tornado wrecked a few spacious barns and a small home while damaging several other barns and houses west of Steele. The funnel reportedly touched down a few times, producing intermittent damage. Large, 1-inch-diameter (2.5 cm) hail accompanying the storm caused additional damage.							
F0	NNE of House※	Neshoba	Mississippi	32.77°N 89.10°W	01:30–?	0.1 mi (0.16 km)‡	33 yd (30 m)‡	$15,000※
F0	A brief tornado formed southeast of Philadelphia, mangling a windmill. Windows and vehicles nearby were smashed or otherwise damaged by hail. Lightning damaged radio towers as well. Oats and gardens were also damaged.							
F2†	Between Linton and Newsom	Davidson	Tennessee	36.05°N 87.03°W	01:45–?	1 mi (1.6 km)†	200 yd (180 m)	$15,000※
F2†	A "'baby twister'" traversing a narrow valley struck the Poplar Farm, severely damaging a corn crib, a pair of farmhouses, and a shed laden with agricultural implements.							
F3	New Lexington to S of Berry†	Fayette, Tuscaloosa	Alabama	33.57°N 87.67°W	02:30–?†	5 mi (8.0 km)†	100 yd (91 m)	$17,500※
F3	1 death – A destructive tornado moved northeastward, paralleling the Fayette–Tuscaloosa County line. In Tuscaloosa County, nine homes were destroyed or damaged, and a dozen additional were likewise affected in Fayette County. The sole fatality was due to a collapsed chimney. 14 injuries were reported.							
F2†	NE of Garden City to N of Chamblees Mill‡	Cullman, Blount	Alabama	34.02°N 86.75°W	02:30–?	≥ 7 mi (11 km)†	100 yd (91 m)	$40,000※
F2†	A tornado touched down near Garden City and moved northeastward. At least 62 homes were damaged or destroyed, and six injuries were confirmed. The tornado may have tracked all the way to Snead.							
F1	NE of Speiden	Giles※, Lincoln	Tennessee	35.23°N 86.82°W	03:00–?	0.2 mi (0.32 km)‡	400 yd (370 m)‡	Unknown
F1	This, the first member of a 30-mile-long (48 km) tornado family, successively passed through or near the small, rural communities of McBurg, Swan Creek, and Boonshill. A house in Giles County was negligibly damaged.							
F3	Shady Grove to Adamsville to Graysville to Pinson¶	Jefferson	Alabama	33.60°N 86.93°W	03:30–?	15 mi (24 km)†	200 yd (180 m)	$65,000†
F3	1 death – An intense tornado moved through the northern suburbs of Birmingham, dispersing debris for several hundred yards. In all 131 homes and other structures were destroyed or damaged. 26 injuries were recorded.							
F2†	Howell to Mulberry※	Lincoln	Tennessee	35.22°N 86.60°W	04:00–?	7.4 mi (11.9 km)‡	350 yd (320 m)‡	$300,000†
F2†	This, the second member of the Speiden tornado family, destroyed or damaged 136 homes and various other structures. A few people were injured and 45 families affected.							
F1	N of Athens	Monroe	Mississippi	33.85°N 88.47°W	04:00–?	0.1 mi (0.16 km)‡	33 yd (30 m)‡	$20,000※
F1	A tornado was confirmed, but without details. One person was injured.							
F4	Lois to Decherd†	Moore, Franklin	Tennessee	35.20°N 86.30°W	04:30–?	12 mi (19 km)†	100 yd (91 m)‡	$435,000†
F4	3 deaths – See section on this tornado – 44 people were injured.							
F1	WNW of Kiln	Hancock	Mississippi	30.42°N 89.48°W	04:30–?	12.7 mi (20.4 km)‡	100 yd (91 m)‡	$12,000※
F1	A tornado was confirmed, but no other data were provided. A few people were injured.							
F2†	Monteagle to Tracy City	Grundy	Tennessee	35.27°N 85.75°W	04:30†–04:45※	6 mi (9.7 km)†	400 yd (370 m)	$200,000※
F2†	This was the final member of the Speiden–Decherd tornado family. About 150 homes and other buildings were damaged along the path, and widespread, F2-level damage was reported. Two people were injured.							

=== February 29 event ===
List of confirmed tornadoes – Friday, February 29, 1952 (Note: Prior to 1994, only the average widths of tornado paths were officially listed.)
F#	Location	County / Parish	State	Start coord.	Time (UTC)	Path length	Max. width	Summary
F1	Belfast	Marshall	TN	35.42°N 86.70°W	22:00–?	0.1 miles (0.16 km)	100 yards (91 m)	3 deaths – A brief, but catastrophic tornado destroyed a number of buildings in the center of Belfast as it struck four farms. Two of these farms were destroyed. 166 people were injured and losses totaled $25,000. As of 2025, this is the most injuries ever caused by an F1/EF1 tornado in the United States, although sources vary tremendously on the actual casualty toll as it appears that the injury count was actually for the F4 tornado listed below. Tornado researcher Thomas P. Grazulis assessed the tornado as having caused F3-level damage while only killing one person.
F4	Downtown Fayetteville	Lincoln	TN	35.15°N 86.58°W	22:30–?	2 miles (3.2 km)	300 yards (270 m)	2 deaths – See section on this tornado – 150 people were injured and damage was estimated at $2.5 million. Grazulis assessed the tornado as having caused F3-level damage.
F2	Viola	Warren	TN	35.53°N 85.85°W	22:40–?	1 mile (1.6 km)	400 yards (370 m)	The storm that had "practically spent itself over Fayetteville" produced this strong, large tornado about 50 miles (80 km) to the northeast, damaging or destroying several farm buildings. Damage was estimated at $25,000.
F3	Northern Fort Payne	DeKalb	AL	34.5°N 85.7°W	23:00–?	3.3 miles (5.3 km)	400 yards (370 m)	See section on this tornado – There were 12 injuries.
F2	W of Claxton to Englewood	McMinn	TN	35.3°N 84.67°W	23:30–00:30	15.3 miles (24.6 km)	587 yards (537 m)	A large tornado embedded in a mile-wide swath of hail moved eastward through the Eastanollee Valley before dissipating near the Etowah Highway. Many homes, barns, stores, and a church were destroyed or damaged. Many cattle and horses were killed as well. Damage to crops was confined to hay stored in thee barns that were destroyed. Losses totaled $250,000.
F2	WNW of Vandiver to E of Parhams	Franklin	GA	34.4°N 83.33°W	01:00–?	7.8 miles (12.6 km)	77 yards (70 m)	A destructive tornado north of Carnesville moved eastward from the Strange district. Three or more homes and numerous smaller buildings were destroyed with moderate to heavy damages to several other homes and many smaller buildings. Many trees and utility lines were blown down and a substantial number of poultry was lost. Losses totaled $25,000.
F2	NW of Homer to Mt. Pleasant to W of Jewelville	Banks	GA	34.37°N 83.58°W	01:30–?	9.4 miles (15.1 km)	300 yards (270 m)	A destructive tornado moved eastward, from Hickory Flat to Nails Creek, passing north of Homer and striking Mt. Pleasant. A total of 10 or more homes, a school, and numerous chicken houses and barns were destroyed with moderate to heavy damages to 25 or more homes, and many smaller buildings. Many trees and utility lines were blown down, and a large number of poultry lost. Three people were injured, and damage was estimated at $250,000.
F2	S of Pendergrass	Jackson	GA	34.12°N 83.67°W	02:15–?	0.2 miles (0.32 km)	17 yards (16 m)	Although information for this event is incomplete, a strong tornadic event is believed to have taken place. One dwelling was destroyed, injuring five occupants, while two other dwellings, a tenant house, and two barns, were unroofed. A large chicken house was also destroyed, causing the loss of more than 8,000 chicks. Losses totaled $25,000.

== March ==
Confirmed tornadoes by Fujita rating
FU	F0	F1	F2	F3	F4	F5	Total
1	0	0	0	0	0	0	0

=== March 16 event ===
A tornado struck Santa Monica California in Los Angeles, the tornado damaged 3 boats in a boat yard. 3 people we're killed and one person was injured.

=== March 21–22 event ===
List of confirmed tornadoes – Friday, March 21, 1952
F#	Location	County / Parish	State	Start Coord. (Note: All starting coordinates are based on the NCEI database and may not reflect contemporary analyses)	Time (UTC)	Path length	Width (Note: The listed width values are primarily the average/mean width of the tornadoes, with those having known maximum widths denoted by ♯. From 1952 to 1994, reports largely list mean width whereas contemporary years list maximum width. Values provided by Grazulis are the average width, with estimates being rounded down (i.e. 0.5 mi (0.80 km) is rounded down from 880 yards to 800 yards.)	Damage
F4	N of Provo to northwestern Dierks to WSW of Newhope†	Howard	AR	34.02°N 94.02°W	21:00–21:15※	13 mi (21 km)	800 yd (730 m)†	$151,500※
F4	7 deaths – This violent tornado, the first member of a long-lived tornado family, destroyed 22 homes on the outskirts of Dierks, most of which were frail, and killed livestock and poultry. Many homes southwest of town were flattened, sustaining F4 damage, and trees were stripped of their bark. Nine people were injured.							
F2†	In and near Paron※	Saline※	AR	34.72°N 92.82°W	22:00–22:15※	15 mi (24 km)†	400 yd (370 m)†	$39,000※
F2†	This tornado originated in the same supercell as the Dierks event. Near Paron, it destroyed one home and unroofed several others. Barns and a church were wrecked as well. A number of livestock died or sustained injuries. The NCEI list the path as extending east-northeastward, from southwest of Paron to east of Ferndale, but available descriptions indicate that the tornado headed northeastward, striking Paron.							
F2	W of Mayflower to S of Saltillo†	Faulkner	AR	34.95°N 92.42°W	22:30–?†	8 mi (13 km)†	Unknown	$15,000※
F2	A strong tornado wrecked many small homes near Mayflower and destroyed or damaged six other homes near Saltillo. A few people were injured.							
F4	SSW of Searcy to Judsonia※ to western Russell†	White	AR	35.22°N 91.70°W	22:50–?‡	22 mi (35 km)†	2,640 yd (2,410 m)♯※	$3,500,000※
F4	50+ deaths – This large, intense tornado was 1 1/2 mi (2.4 km) wide at times. After impacting northwestern Kensett, it passed through the business district of Judsonia and damaged or destroyed 945 structures in town. In all, at least 30 deaths were confirmed in Judsonia alone, and the town itself was virtually destroyed. 20 more deaths occurred between Bald Knob and Russell. Damage also occurred near Midway, and 500-pound (230 kg) concrete blocks were tossed 80 yd (240 ft). 325 injuries occurred along the path. The tornado became the fourth deadliest in the U.S. state of Arkansas on record.							
F4†	SW of England to northwestern Cotton Plant† to Hillemann※	Lonoke, Prairie, Woodruff	AR	34.53°N 91.80°W	23:00–?	70 mi (110 km)†	800 yd (730 m)†	$700,000†
F4†	40+ deaths – This violent, long-tracked tornado first wrecked 40 homes on the northwestern outskirts of England, the majority of which were poorly built, killing nine people. South of Hazen, near Tollville, the tornado destroyed 42 more homes and claimed a few additional lives in the vicinity. The tornado then ravaged the northwestern part of Cotton Plant, where 29 people lost their lives. The tornado also caused extensive damage in Hillemann before apparently dissipating. In all the tornado injured 274 people and was the sixth deadliest in Arkansas on record. Some additional deaths may have occurred in rural areas, and the tornado may have continued as far as Vanndale, just north of Wynne.							
F4†	SW of Wattensaw to Georgetown to NE of Hickory Ridge†	Lonoke, Prairie, White†, Woodruff, Jackson†, Cross※	AR	34.90°N 91.85°W	23:17–?※	65 mi (105 km)†	600 yd (550 m)†	$700,000†
F4†	8 deaths – This tornado, closely paralleling the preceding event, killed two people and injured six others as it struck the rural community of Wattensaw. Afterward, it successively impacted and devastated all or part of Hickory Plains, Georgetown, McCrory, and Hickory Ridge. In this swath many brick homes were flattened, along with those of lesser construction. Two of the eight fatalities, along with 15 injuries, occurred at Hickory Plains and four more at Hickory Ridge. The villages of McCrory and Georgetown were virtually leveled, and 116 homes were destroyed or damaged at Hickory Ridge. In all, 50 people were injured.							
F3†	Bruceville to E of RoEllen† to Churchton※	Lauderdale†, Dyer, Gibson†	TN	36.02°N 89.20°W	23:35–?※	20 mi (32 km)†	200 yd (180 m)	Unknown
F3†	1+ death – This intense tornado passed through or near Bruceville, Bonicord, Tatumville, Edgewood, and Lapata. In all 17 homes were wrecked, and 20 injuries occurred. Grazulis assessed this tornado as an F4 in 1984, but reduced its ranking nine years later. Other estimates of the death toll range from two to four.							
F2†	SE of Blackville to E of Balch† to near Lake City	Jackson, Poinsett†, Craighead※	AR	35.47°N 91.20°W	23:40–?	40 mi (64 km)†	440 yd (400 m)‡	$21,000※
F2†	This tornado, which generated only sporadic damage, formed from the same storm as the Judsonia–Bald Knob F4. It damaged or destroyed 15 homes in Jackson County, many of which were small. Intermittent damage began near Weldon and occurred as far as Cash. In all, six people sustained injuries.							
F3	Fisher† to N of Harrisburg to NE of Blytheville※	Poinsett, Craighead†, Mississippi※	AR	35.60°N 90.72°W	~00:45–01:45※	70 mi (110 km)†	600 yd (550 m)†	$1,500,000†
F3	4 deaths – This intense tornado family destroyed or damaged at least 45 structures between Fisher and Trumann. Between Milligan Ridge and Blytheville, the tornado destroyed or damaged 300 homes. In all, the tornado, which also affected areas in and near Caraway, destroyed or damaged about 650 homes. At least 57 injuries were reported along the path.							
F2†	SW of Marked Tree※ to ENE of Lepanto	Poinsett※	AR	35.53°N 90.42°W	01:45–01:50※	10 mi (16 km)†	200 yd (180 m)	Unknown
F2†	1 death – This strong tornado developed in the same storm as the England–Cotton Plant F4. It destroyed or damaged 23 homes, one or more of which were small. It also just barely missed the town of Alto. Seven injuries occurred.							
F4	Near Yarbro (AR) to near Cooter (MO) to between Elbridge (TN) and Ridgely (TN)†	Mississippi (AR)†, Pemiscot (MO), Dyer (TN)†, Lake (TN)†, Obion (TN)†	AR†, MO, TN†	36.05°N 89.82°W	02:00–?	30 mi (48 km)†	2,500 yd (2,300 m)♯※	$1,500,000†
F4	25+ deaths – This large, violent tornado, attended by hail, was up to 2,500 yd (7,500 ft; 1.4 mi; 2.3 km) wide at times and damaged or destroyed up to 200 homes, many of which were small, frail tenant homes, along with many farmsteads. After passing just north of Cottonwood Point, Missouri, the tornado then traversed the Mississippi River into Tennessee, and passed just south of Owl Hoot. A vehicle was reportedly thrown 1 mi (1.6 km). In all, 150 people were injured. The tornado formed from the same storm as the Fisher–Blythevile F3.							
F3	SW of Unionville to eastern Dyersburg to NW of Kenton†	Dyer, Gibson†, Obion†	TN	35.95°N 89.43°W	02:10†–?	30 mi (48 km)†	Unknown	Unknown
F3	9+ deaths – This intense tornado first destroyed more than 12 homes and caused two deaths in the community of Unionville. After barely missing the town of Fowlkes, the tornado ravaged part of Dyersburg. At the Dyersburg Regional Airport, the tornado destroyed a hangar, numerous airplanes, and a new administration building. Along the path, the tornado destroyed 15 farmsteads. 50 people were injured, and a tenth death may have occurred.							
F0	Madison	Madison	MS	32.47°N 90.12°W	02:30–?	1 mi (1.6 km)※	20 yd (18 m)	$1,000※
F0	A brief tornado was observed. One person was injured.							
F4	SW of Byhalia (MS) to Cayce (MS)※ to SSE of Williston (TN)†	Marshall (MS), Fayette (TN)	MS, TN	34.87°N 89.68°W	03:45–?※	35 mi (56 km)†	300 yd (270 m)†	$200,000†
F4	17 deaths – This extremely violent tornado may have been a family, merging with a second, undocumented tornado upon formation. Along its path, it destroyed 38 homes, causing particularly severe damage near Byhalia and Moscow, Tennessee. It was once classified as an F5, based on the destruction of a concrete block structure; however, as the building was not steel-reinforced, the Storm Prediction Center later reduced the intensity to F4. In all, 94 people were injured.							
F2†	SW of Medina to Bruceton† to NNW of Lipe‡	Madison†, Gibson, Carroll, Benton‡	TN	35.80°N 88.78°W	04:30†–05:17※	40 mi (64 km)†	400 yd (370 m)†	$1,000,000†
F2†	2+ deaths – This strong, long-lived tornado passed through the Milan Arsenal, southeast of Milan, destroying or damaging 30 buildings, including barracks, and 65 vehicles. Losses at the arsenal totaled $500,000 and three injuries occurred there. After passing near Lavinia, the tornado then destroyed 12 homes near Leach. The tornado then wrecked three homes and demolished the business district in Bruceton. In all, 23 people sustained injuries. A few additional fatalities may have occurred.							
F4	SW of Bolivar to northern Henderson† to Chesterfield※ to near Bible Hill†	Hardeman, Chester, Henderson※, Decatur†	TN	35.27°N 88.98°W	04:45†–05:30※	65 mi (105 km)†	1,200 yd (1,100 m)†	$3,315,000※
F4	38 deaths – This devastating tornado damaged or destroyed 609 homes, impacting Henderson—a large swath of which incurred borderline-F5 damage—killing 23 people there, and claimed 11 more lives between Darden and Jacks Creek. It developed in the same storm as the Byhalia–Moscow F4 and may have been the same tornado. 157 people were injured along the path. The areas between Silerton and south-southwest of Lexington would be hit again by an F2 tornado just under one year later.							

=== March 22 event ===
List of confirmed tornadoes – Saturday, March 22, 1952
F#	Location	County / Parish	State	Start Coord.	Time (UTC)	Path length	Width	Damage
F2†	Downtown† Carthage※	Smith	TN	36.25°N 85.93°W	05:15†–?	0.3 mi (0.48 km)‡	100 yd (91 m)※	$24,000※
F2†	This brief tornado unroofed and destroyed a large building. A few other structures incurred damage nearby and one person was injured.							
F2	SW of Buffalo※	Humphreys	TN	35.85°N 87.68°W	05:55–?	1 mi (1.6 km)†	500 yd (460 m)	$50,000※
F2	This brief, strong tornado formed from the same storm as the Bolivar–Henderson F4. It destroyed several barns, damaged outbuildings, and unroofed three homes on farmsteads in and near Squeeze Bottom.							
F3	Southern Hodgenville※	LaRue	KY	37.53°N 85.72°W	06:05–06:10※	3 mi (4.8 km)※	100 yd (91 m)†	$250,000
F3	This intense tornado passed near the Abraham Lincoln Birthplace National Historical Park. It damaged or destroyed 61 homes, nine of which were cottages, and the county fairgrounds. The tornado also unroofed a warehouse and flattened several barns. A total of 18 injuries occurred. The NCEI incorrectly list the path as extending from northwest of Buffalo to east-southeast of White City.							
F2±	SSE of Spot	Hickman	TN	35.87°N 87.58°W	06:20–?	0.5 mi (0.80 km)‡	40 yd (37 m)	$35,000※
F2±	3 deaths – In a rural area this tornado damaged or destroyed nine homes and injured 10 people. Grazulis did not list this tornado at all, implying that it was a downburst, microburst, or other strong, convectively generated wind. The tornado passed east of the Bucksnort–Only area.							
F4	Massey to Winton to southern Redstone Arsenal†	Morgan, Madison※	AL	34.60°N 87.00°W	20:45†–?	25 mi (40 km)†	100 yd (91 m)	$150,000※
F4	4 deaths – This violent tornado moved through areas near Hartselle and ended south of Decatur. It damaged or destroyed 84 structures, including 35 homes, many of which sustained F4 damage, though due to poor quality of construction the rating is somewhat questionable. 50 injuries were confirmed. The NCEI incorrectly places the track as going from northeast of Moulton Heights to south-southwest of Huntsville via Decatur and Mooresville.							

== May ==
=== May 21 event ===
- The CDNS listed an additional tornado:
  - A tornado occurred in Arvada, Colorado. The condensation funnel did not reach the ground and damage was light. Some birds were killed when they were drawn into the funnel.

List of confirmed tornadoes – Wednesday, May 21, 1952 (Note: All dates are based on the local time zone where the tornado touched down; however, all times are in Coordinated Universal Time and dates are split at midnight CST/CDT for consistency.) (Note: Prior to 1994, only the average widths of tornado paths were officially listed.)
F#	Location	County / Parish	State	Start coord.	Time (UTC)	Path length	Max. width	Summary
F0	NNW of Alton	Osborne	KS	39.52°N 99.00°W	00:00–?	0.1 miles (0.16 km)	33 yards (30 m)	The NCEI officially records a brief tornado that touched in expansive area of severe storms that affected nine counties. No damage estimate was given.
F2	Kackley	Republic	KS	39.68°N 97.87°W	01:30–?	0.2 miles (0.32 km)	100 yards (91 m)	A small, but destructive tornado destroyed every building on a farm except the house and killed 50 chickens and six small pigs. Small hail and rain accompanied the tornado, which caused $25,000 in damage. The tornado may have started in Jewel County, where a barn was destroyed.

=== May 22 event ===
List of confirmed tornadoes – Thursday, May 22, 1952
F#	Location	County / Parish	State	Start coord.	Time (UTC)	Path length	Max. width	Summary
F4	Lawrence to E of Wilder	Douglas, Leavenworth, Wyandotte, Johnson	KS	38.98°N 95.22°W	23:00–?	26.9 miles (43.3 km)	440 yards (400 m)	A violent tornado accompanied by hail touched down on the northeastern side of Lawrence and destroyed an alfalfa dehydrator and caused minor damage elsewhere. It skipped east-northeastward before touching down solidly again on the north side of the Kansas River and moving into the south side of Kansas City at rate of about 70 miles per hour (110 km/h). 12 homes and 67 other buildings were destroyed, including a bank president's home that was leveled, 14 other homes and 13 other building were damaged, and 20 cows, 1,200 chickens, 15 hogs, and 5 sheep were killed. 11 miles (18 km) of power lines and thousands of trees were blown down as well. Tornado expert Thomas P. Grazulis indicated that the tornado may have possibly reached F5 intensity. Three people were injured and damages were estimated at $250,000. The CDNS report lists 13 injuries form this tornado.
F2	Lake Lotawana	Johnson	MO	38.93°N 94.23°W	01:00–01:10	1.3 miles (2.1 km)	440 yards (400 m)	A tornado accompanied by strong winds damaged a few houses, barns, and outbuildings. One person was injured and damages were estimated at $250,000. The CDNS report does not list any injuries. A funnel cloud was spotted north of nearby Lee's Summit about two hours later, but it did not touch down.
F1	SSE of Rush Springs	Grady	OK	34.75°N 97.92°W	05:30–?	0.1 miles (0.16 km)	33 yards (30 m)	A barn was damaged and moved about 25 feet (7.6 m) with damages estimated at $250.

=== May 23 event ===
List of confirmed tornadoes – Friday, May 23, 1952
F#	Location	County / Parish	State	Start coord.	Time (UTC)	Path length	Max. width	Summary
F1	NW of Cushing	Payne	OK	36.02°N 96.82°W	10:00–?	0.1 miles (0.16 km)	33 yards (30 m)	A farmstead was destroyed, with losses totaling $2,500. A gasoline plant in Cushing suffered $20,000 in damage from straight-line winds and six cows were killed when lightning struck a tree they were huddled under.
F1	E of Snyder to NW of Meers	Kiowa, Comanche	OK	34.67°N 98.87°W	10:30–?	16.9 miles (27.2 km)	100 yards (91 m)	A skipping tornado touched down twice, destroying two barns and causing $2,500 in damage.
F2	Lawton	Comanche	OK	34.62°N 98.42°W	10:45–?	0.3 miles (0.48 km)	150 yards (140 m)	A tornado damaged several buildings as it moved eastward about three blocks. One person was injured and losses totaled $250,000.
F2	Fort Sill	Comanche	OK	34.65°N 98.43°W	11:00–?	0.1 miles (0.16 km)	200 yards (180 m)	This tornado touched down northwest of the previous one. It destroyed four warehouses and one smaller building with losses totaling $250,000.
F0	Brownsboro	Henderson	TX	32.22°N 95.62°W	17:40–?	0.5 miles (0.80 km)	33 yards (30 m)	Buildings were unroofed and plate glass windows were pulled out of buildings. Losses totaled $2,500. It is possible that this tornado was the last of the day rather than fifth according to the CDNS report.
F2	Dumont	Butler	IA	42.75°N 92.97°W	19:00–?	0.1 miles (0.16 km)	17 yards (16 m)	"Long tapering funnel moved northward." A town garage was unroofed and telephone poles were knocked down, interrupting electric service. No damage estimate was given.
F0	Brooksville	Hernando	FL	28.55°N 82.38°W	19:30–?	0.1 miles (0.16 km)	33 yards (30 m)	A tornado wrecked a chicken house and damaged others, killing a number of chickens. A physician was injured when his car was struck by the tornado on the highway, spinning it around several times and before ejecting him. Loses totaled $2,500. Heavy rain and hail preceded the tornado.
F1	San Angelo	Tom Green	TX	31.45°N 100.48°W	20:30–?	7.1 miles (11.4 km)	50 yards (46 m)	A few chicken houses and a house was damaged, injuring one person and causing $2,500 in damage.
F1	Grafton	Worth	IA	43.33°N 93.08°W	21:00–?	0.1 miles (0.16 km)	33 yards (30 m)	A funnel cloud was observed moving northeastward at 20–25 miles per hour (32–40 km/h). A barn was demolished while only minor damage occurred nearby. A few chickens were also killed. No damage estimate was given.

=== May 24 event ===
List of confirmed tornadoes – Saturday, May 24, 1952
F#	Location	County / Parish	State	Start coord.	Time (UTC)	Path length	Max. width	Summary
F1	Bedford	Cuyahoga	OH	41.42°N 81.50°W	21:05–?	0.1 miles (0.16 km)	200 yards (180 m)	Several observers reported the passage of a "dark, funnel cloud without an attendant thunderstorm, hail, or rain, although rain had preceded the storm." It moved northeastward through the business district in the downtown area before striking a residential area. Roofs were damaged, signs and utility lines were destroyed, trees were leveled, windows were broken, and several garages were demolished. A large plate-glass window on the front of a business was blown outward while other windows in path of storm were blown inward. Losses totaled $25,000.
F1	Belleville	St.Clair	IL	39.50°N 90.02°W	23:50–?	0.1 miles (0.16 km)	33 yards (30 m)	A tornado moved down a runway at Scott Air Force Base, damaging 14 aircraft. A small building was also partially demolished. Losses totaled $25,000. Hail and strong winds also caused additional damage to crops in the area.

== June ==
There were 34 tornadoes confirmed in the US in June.

=== June 23 event ===
- Tornado researcher Thomas P. Grazulis listed an additional tornado:
  - An F3-level event destroyed an entire farmstead near Danube in Renville County, Minnesota. The tornado was also in the CDNS report. It is officially unrecorded.

List of confirmed tornadoes – Monday, June 23, 1952 (Note: All dates are based on the local time zone where the tornado touched down; however, all times are in Coordinated Universal Time and dates are split at midnight CST/CDT for consistency.) (Note: Prior to 1994, only the average widths of tornado paths were officially listed.)
F#	Location	County / Parish	State	Start coord.	Time (UTC)	Path length	Max. width	Summary
F2	ESE of Benson to W of Sunburg	Swift	MN	45.3°N 95.5°W	22:30–?	8.4 miles (13.5 km)	220 yards (200 m)	This tornado was likely one of several, embedded within a 150-square-mile (390 km^{2}) series of downbursts, and caused "great destruction" along its path through farmland. Several tornadoes were probably responsible for the damage but were officially unrecorded. A number of barns were destroyed near Benson. Losses totaled $2.5 million. The tornado was rated F3 by Grazulis.
F4	SSW of Marcus to Southern Cleghorn to Southern Larrabee to SSW of Peterson	Cherokee	IA	42.75°N 95.85°W	00:30–?	24.1 miles (38.8 km)	400 yards (370 m)	This large, violent tornado first touched down south-southwest of Marcus. It moved east-northeastward, passing 4 miles (6.4 km) south of the town while causing major damage to farms in the region. It then clipped the south side of Cleghorn as it continued to damage or destroy farms across the region. It then continued to be strong to violent as it moved through areas northeast of town. Afterwards, it passed 2 miles (3.2 km) south and east of Larrabee while continuing to damage or destroy farms. The tornado then weakened and dissipated south-southwest of Peterson. In all, 53 farmsteads were hit, with 13 of them being completely demolished and 34 suffered major damage. There were four injuries and $2.5 million in damage.
F0	Forestburg	Sanborn	SD	42.75°N 95.85°W	00:55–?	2 miles (3.2 km)	43 yards (39 m)	A tornado was photographed as it occasionally touched down near Forestburg over a 20-minute period. Fences, haystacks, and corn plants were destroyed. Damage was only estimated to be $30.
F2	Jeffers to Lafayette to Chaska to Eden Prairie	Cottonwood, Brown, Nicollet, Sibley, Carver, Hennepen	MN	44.00°N 95.28°W	02:30–?	104.8 miles (168.7 km)	220 yards (200 m)	A long-tracked tornado, which was probably a tornado family due to the path being non-continuous, moved through several counties southwest of Minneapolis, dissipating in the southwestern suburbs of the city. About 70 barns, silos, steel granaries, windmills, farm machinery, and automobiles were destroyed. Many homes, buildings, and barns were damaged and poultry and livestock were killed. Plate-glass windows were blown in, hundreds of trees were uprooted, power poles and wires were down and growing crops were damaged. Major damage occurred south of Lake Minnetonka as well. 10 people were injured and damage was estimated to be $10 million. The tornado was not listed as significant by Grazulis.
F3	St. Croix Falls to Centuria to Bone Lake	Polk	WI	45.42°N 92.63°W	03:30–?	18.2 miles (29.3 km)	100 yards (91 m)	2 deaths – This possible tornado was later confirmed. Severe damage occurred along its path, especially in Centuria, with a dozen homes being unroofed by the tornado. Witnesses did not see the funnel cloud, but said that the wind was of explosive force. A man was killed by flying debris as he sought shelter while a woman was killed in the basement of a small home that was obliterated. Six people were injured and damage was estimated at $2.5 million.

=== June 24 event ===
List of confirmed tornadoes – Tuesday, June 24, 1952
F#	Location	County / Parish	State	Start coord.	Time (UTC)	Path length	Max. width	Summary
F0	NE of Philip	Haakon	SD	44.18°N 101.45°W	16:00–?	0.1 miles (0.16 km)	23 yards (21 m)	An airline pilot reported a funnel cloud that touched down about 15 miles (24 km) northeast of Philip. A damage estimate of $30 was given for this tornado.
F2	NW of Cleveland to Downtown Minneapolis to Lino Lakes	Le Sueur, Scott, Hennepin, Ramsey, Anoka	MN	44.33°N 93.85°W	00:30–?	70.9 miles (114.1 km)	267 yards (244 m)	A long-tracked tornado, which was probably a tornado family, first touched down near Cleveland and moved northeastward, causing severe damage along its path. It moved through the southwestern part of the Minneapolis suburbs before entering Downtown Minneapolis. After moving through it, it continued northeastward, going through the northeastern suburbs of Minneapolis before dissipating near Lino Lakes. About 35 houses, barns, outbuildings, garages, large canvas tent, silos, windmills, steel granaries, farm machinery, and automobiles were destroyed while many other homes, buildings, barns, an automobile racing speedway, hangars, and several airplanes were damaged. Poultry and some livestock were killed, hundreds of trees uprooted, many poles, wires, radio and television antennae down, plate-glass windows were blown in and growing crops damaged. A number of reports of funnel-shaped clouds were observed and a large trailer truck heavily loaded with tombstones was lifted off the road in extreme southern Anoka County and wrecked. In all, 15 people were injured and losses total $5 million. Grazulis rated the tornado F3 and described the event as a complex of tornadoes and downbursts.

== July ==
There were 27 tornadoes confirmed in the US in July.

== August ==
There were 16 tornadoes confirmed in the US in August.

== September ==
Confirmed tornadoes by Fujita rating
FU	F0	F1	F2	F3	F4	F5	Total
0	0	0	0	1	0	0	1

== October ==
Confirmed tornadoes by Fujita rating
FU	F0	F1	F2	F3	F4	F5	Total
0	0	0	0	0	0	0	0

== November ==
Confirmed tornadoes by Fujita rating
FU	F0	F1	F2	F3	F4	F5	Total
0	2	1	2	1	0	0	6

== December ==
Confirmed tornadoes by Fujita rating
FU	F0	F1	F2	F3	F4	F5	Total
0	1	0	1	1	0	0	3

== See also ==
- Tornadoes of 1952
- List of North American tornadoes and tornado outbreaks

== Bibliography ==
- Agee, Ernest M.; Childs, Samuel (June 1, 2014). "Adjustments in Tornado Counts, F-Scale Intensity, and Path Width for Assessing Significant Tornado Destruction". Journal of Applied Meteorology and Climatology. 53 (6). American Meteorological Society: 1494–1505. Bibcode:2014JApMC..53.1494A. doi:10.1175/JAMC-D-13-0235.1.
- Barto, E. M. (March 1952). Written at Nashville, Tennessee. "Tennessee – March 1952". Special Weather Summary. Climatological Data. 57 (3). Asheville, North Carolina: National Climatic Data Center: 26.
- Gordon, John D.; Boyd, Bobby; Rose, Mark; Wright, Jason B. (2000). "The Forgotten F5: The Lawrence County Supercell During the Middle Tennessee Tornado Outbreak of 16 April 1998" (PDF). National Weather Digest. 24 (4). Norman, Oklahoma: National Weather Association: 3–10. Archived from the original (PDF) on December 18, 2012. "The authors sent a detailed letter to the SPC recommending the two tornadoes from 1974, and the 1952 tornado mentioned above, be downgraded to F4. The SPC agreed to all three of these changes. The SPC database now reflects the conclusions of Professor Fujita's map of 1974, and Grazulis 1952 tornado report (1993). ... The authors suggested that the three former F5 tornadoes in Tennessee should be reclassified as F4. These changes have been adopted, making the 16 April 1998 Lawrence County tornado the only documented F5 in the history of Tennessee."
- Grazulis, Thomas P. (May 1984). Violent Tornado Climatography, 1880–1982. OSTI (Technical report). NUREG. Washington, D.C.: Nuclear Regulatory Commission. OSTI 7099491. CR-3670.
- Grazulis, Thomas P. (July 1993). Significant Tornadoes 1680–1991: A Chronology and Analysis of Events. St. Johnsbury, Vermont: The Tornado Project of Environmental Films. ISBN 1-879362-03-1.
- Hickmon, Walter C. (March 1952). Written at Little Rock, Arkansas. "Arkansas – March 1952". Special Weather Summary. Climatological Data. 57 (3). Asheville, North Carolina: National Climatic Data Center: 26, 30.
- National Weather Service (February 1952). Storm Data Publication (Report). National Centers for Environmental Information – via Storm Events Database.
- U.S. Weather Bureau (March 1952). "Severe Storms". Climatological Data National Summary. 3 (3). Asheville, North Carolina: National Climatic Data Center: 71–4.
