= Alabama State Route 36 =

State highway in Alabama, United States

State Route 36

Route information
- Maintained by ALDOT
- Length: 44.5 mi (71.6 km)
- Existed: 1957–present

Major junctions
- West end: SR 33 in Wren
- SR 157 southeast of Moulton; US 31 in Hartselle; I-65 in Hartselle; SR 67 southeast of Somerville
- East end: US 231 in Lacey’s Spring

Location
- Country: United States
- State: Alabama
- Counties: Lawrence, Morgan

Highway system
- Alabama State Highway System; Interstate; US; State
← SR 35	→ SR 37

State Route 36 (SR 36) is a 44.5-mile-long (71.6 km) east–west state highway in the northern part of the U.S. state of Alabama. The western terminus of the highway is at its intersection with SR 33 at Wren, an unincorporated community in Lawrence County. The eastern terminus of the highway is at its intersection with U.S. Route 231 (US 231) at Lacey’s Spring in Morgan County.

== Route description ==
Alabama State Route 36 begins in Wren at AL-33. To the south is the hill that is characteristic of the northern border of the William B. Bankhead National Forest directly visible to the south. It enters Speake and junctions with AL-157 directly after an s-bend. It crosses the two roadways of the road (AL-157 is a four-lane divided highway) and s-bends again. It crosses the county line into Morgan County.

The route almost immediately enters Danville and junctions with CR-41 (Danville Road), which leads to Addison and Decatur. . It junctions with CR-72 (Iron Man Road) and continues onward to U.S. 31 in Hartselle. It passes through the center of town and reaches I-65 three miles later. Past this point, the route is in almost a completely straight line. To the south, there are visible mountains. It eventually junctions with AL-67. This is located in Somerville, in a part referred to by some as Pence. Two miles later, it turns northeast and passes through forest, entering Cotaco, which is home to its junctions with CR-35 (Cotaco-Florette Road) and CR-32 (Union Hill Road). It passes by Lacey Springs then drops down to its eastern terminus at U.S. 231. This junction is four miles south of the Tennessee River/Huntsville's city limits and fourteen miles north of Arab.

== History ==
The current designation of SR 36 was formed in 1957 along the former route of SR 33. Beginning in 1940, the first incarnation of SR 36 was along the current route of SR 33.

== Major intersections ==
County	Location	mi	km	Destinations	Notes
Lawrence	Wren	0.0	0.0	SR 33 – Double Springs, Moulton	Western terminus
Lawrence	Speake	7.9	12.7	SR 157	
Morgan	Danville	11.9	19.2	CR 41 (Danville Road)	
Morgan	Hartselle	21.2	34.1	US 31 (SR 3) – Decatur, Cullman	
Morgan	Hartselle	23.6	38.0	I-65 – Nashville, Birmingham	I-65 exit 328
Morgan	Pence	31.9	51.3	SR 67 – Decatur, Oneonta, Somerville	
Morgan	Lacey's Spring	44.5	71.6	US 231 (SR 53) – Huntsville, Arab	Eastern terminus
1.000 mi = 1.609 km; 1.000 km = 0.621 mi
