= Morgan County Schools (Alabama) =

School district in Alabama, United States

Address
- 235 Highway 67 South Decatur, Alabama, 35603; United States
- Coordinates: 34°27′06″N 86°51′26″W

District information
- Type: Public
- Grades: PK–12
- Schools: 18
- NCES District ID: 0102480

Students and staff
- Students: 7,619 (2025–2026)
- Teachers: 440.85 (on an FTE basis) (2025–2026)
- Staff: 497.56 (on an FTE basis) (2025–2026)
- Student–teacher ratio: 17.28 (2025–2026)

Other information
- Website: www.morgank12.org

Morgan County Schools is the operating school district within Morgan County, Alabama.

As of 2025, the superintendent is Tracie Turrentine.

== Schools ==
=== High schools ===
- Albert P. Brewer High School (Somerville)
- Danville High School (Danville)
- Falkville High School (Falkville)
- Priceville High School (Decatur)
- West Morgan High School (Trinity)

=== Middle schools ===
- Cotaco School (Somerville)
- Danville Middle School (Danville)
- Eva School (Eva)
- Lacey's Spring School (Lacey's Spring)
- Priceville Jr. High School (Decatur)
- Ryan School (now closed) (Joppa)
- Sparkman School (Hartselle)
- Union Hill School (Union Hill)
- West Morgan Middle School (Trinity)

=== Elementary schools ===
- Danville-Neel School (Danville)
- Falkville Elementary School (Falkville)
- Priceville Elementary School (Decatur)
- West Morgan Elementary (Decatur)
