= Wren, Alabama =

Unincorporated community in Alabama, United States

- Unincorporated community
- Location within Alabama Location within the United States
- Coordinates: 34°26′03″N 87°17′37″W
- Country: United States
- State: Alabama
- County: Lawrence
- Elevation: 669 ft (204 m)
- Time zone: UTC-6 (Central (CST))
  - Summer (DST): UTC-5 (CDT)
- Area codes: 256, 938
- GNIS feature ID: 160871

Wren is an unincorporated community in Lawrence County, Alabama, United States. Wren is located at the intersection of Alabama State Route 36 and Alabama State Route 33, 3.1 miles (5.0 km) south of Moulton.

== History ==
The community is named for the Wren family, who lived in the area. A post office operated under the name Wren from 1896 to 1906.
