= Brooksville, Alabama =

Brooksville, Alabama may refer to:

- Brooksville, Blount County, Alabama
- Brooksville, Morgan County, Alabama
