= Flint City, Alabama =

Former town in Alabama, United States

- Neighborhood of Decatur; Former town
- Interactive map of Flint City, Alabama
- Coordinates: 34°31′23″N 86°58′13″W
- Country: United States
- State: Alabama
- County: Morgan

Population (1990)
  - Total: 1,033
- Time zone: UTC-6 (Central (CST))
  - Summer (DST): UTC-5 (CDT)

Flint City, Alabama is a former town located in Morgan County, Alabama. The 1990 U.S. census listed a population of 1,033. It was one of the earliest towns established in the 1800s along the banks of the Cotaco and Flint creeks in Morgan County along with Danville, Bluff City, Decatur, and Hartselle. It was annexed into Decatur prior to the 2000 U.S. census.

Historical population
Census	Pop.	Note	%±
1990	1,033		—
