= Basham, Alabama =

- Unincorporated community
- Location within Alabama Location within the United States
- Coordinates: 34°30′53″N 87°01′05″W
- Country: United States
- State: Alabama
- County: Morgan
- Elevation: 745 ft (227 m)
- Time zone: UTC-6 (Central (CST))
  - Summer (DST): UTC-5 (CDT)
- ZIP code: 35640
- Area code: 256
- GNIS feature ID: 156031

Basham (/ˈbæsˌhæm/) is an unincorporated community in western Morgan County, Alabama, United States, located just south of the city limits of the Morgan County seat Decatur.

== History ==
The community currently known as Basham grew up around Basham Chapel Methodist Church, near the junction of Danville Road and Mud Tavern–Bird Spring Road. This community is distinct from and not to be confused with the community of Basham's Gap, lying in southwestern Morgan County, which is now more commonly called Penn.
