= Albert P. Brewer High School =

Public high school in Somerville, Alabama

Location
- 59 Eva Rd; Somerville, (Morgan County), Alabama 35670; United States
- 34°24′46.34″N 86°42′18.99″W

Information
- School type: Public school (government funded), high school
- Established: 1972
- School district: Morgan County Schools
- NCES District ID: 0102480
- CEEB code: 012510
- NCES School ID: 010248001696
- Principal: Lewis White
- Faculty: 50.39 (on an FTE basis)
- Grades: 9–12
- Enrollment: 757 (2024-25)
- Student to teacher ratio: 15.02
- Campus: Rural
- Campus size: 80 acres (32 ha)
- Colors: Red, White, and Blue
- Mascot: Patriot
- Website: bhs.morgank12.org

Albert P. Brewer Area Vocational and High School is part of the Morgan County School System. The school is in the foot hills of the Appalachian Mountains near Florette, Alabama. The grounds are approximately 80 acres. Its mascot is the Patriot, and its colors are red, white, and blue. Brewer is the largest high school in the Morgan County System and is classified as a 5A school by the Alabama High School Athletic Association. Brewer's biggest rivals in sports have traditionally been Hartselle, Arab and most recently Priceville.

== History ==
Albert P. Brewer Area Vocational and High School was created in 1972 by combining grades 10-12 from seven area high schools.

The school evolved from combining the five high schools of Cotaco, Eva, Ryan, Union Hill, and Priceville. Also, the other high schools in the Morgan County School System send their vocational and JROTC students to Brewer. In 1981 the 9th graders were also moved to Brewer. Beginning with the 2001-2002 school year, Priceville High School began removing one grade each year to become a high school again. Brewer's student body currently consists of students from four feeder schools: Cotaco, Eva, Lacey's Spring, and Union Hill.

The construction of Brewer cost 2 million dollars in 1972, which would be about 12 million dollars in 2020.

== Present day ==
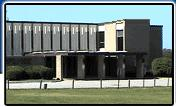
Brewer

There are currently about 902 students in grades 9-12. Brewer offers all the academics for honors and regular diplomas. In 2016, Brewer added several Advanced Placement courses for students. Brewer offers the only JROTC program and vocational/technical classes for the county school system. Students have a variety of elective subjects for participation. Students may also participate in a variety of extracurricular activities, programs and clubs.

== Extracurricular ==
Besides the main academic classrooms, there are 15 vocational/technical classes at A. P. Brewer Area Vocational and High School. In addition there are several science labs, computer labs, and a library with a video room for viewing materials and another video room to produce Brewer's television show, currently, "Patriot TV”.Brewer's first in school, student created television show was produced by Carson Clark and called "Good Morning B.H.S." Subsequent to Carson's tenure at Brewer, the late Jon David McAnally produced "Patriot Pride." "Patriot Pride" was continued and produced for four more years by John W. Tomlinson. These television shows could not have been possible without the support of two people who dedicated themselves to the students of Brewer, the late David Gurley and the late Johnnie Sue Gurley McAnally Ward. In order to honor their memories, in the late 1990s, John W. Tomlinson, a student at the time, and Jerry Thomas, a teacher at the time who taught English and sponsored the Thespian Society, undertook a campaign to rename Brewer's library "The David Gurley and Johnnie Sue McAnally Ward Media Center." John and Jerry raised the funds and had Ms. Ward's portrait commissioned to be displayed by her brother's portrait in the Media Center.

There is also an JROTC / In-School Suspension building and Band Room. There are two gymnasiums, a softball complex, and a baseball complex. The football stadium has a six lane track, field house, and weight room. Besides the regulation football field, there are four additional regulation fields that are used for practicing football, soccer, and a marching band field. One of these additional fields is the official soccer field. There is also an Outdoor Classroom and "Farm" for the agriculture classes, and two greenhouses used for the Horticulture classes.

== Sports ==
- Baseball
- Basketball
- Cheerleading
- Cross Country
- Football
- Golf
- Soccer
- Softball
- Track
- Volleyball
- Wrestling

== Notable alumni ==
- Jan Crawford, chief legal and political correspondent for CBS News
- Cully Hamner, comic book artist and writer.
- Gary Knotts, Former MLB player (Florida Marlins, Detroit Tigers)
- Kassie Miller, television personality and singer-songwriter
- Travis S. Taylor, star of National Geographic Channel's Rocket City Rednecks.
- Gary Winton (Class of 1974), basketball player at Army
