= Alabama State Route 33 =

State highway in Alabama, United States

State Route 33

Route information
- Maintained by ALDOT
- Length: 39.060 mi (62.861 km)
- Existed: 1957–present

Major junctions
- South end: US 278 / SR 195 at Double Springs
- SR 36 at Wren; SR 24 at Moulton; SR 157 at Moulton
- North end: US 72 Alt. at Courtland

Location
- Country: United States
- State: Alabama

Highway system
- Alabama State Highway System; Interstate; US; State
← SR 32	→ SR 34

State Route 33 (SR 33) is a 50.609-mile-long (81.447 km) state highway in the northwestern part of the U.S. state of Alabama. The southern terminus of the highway is at its intersection with U.S. Route 278 (US 278) at Double Springs. The northern terminus of the highway is at its intersection with US 72 Alt. and SR 20 at Courtland.

== Route description ==
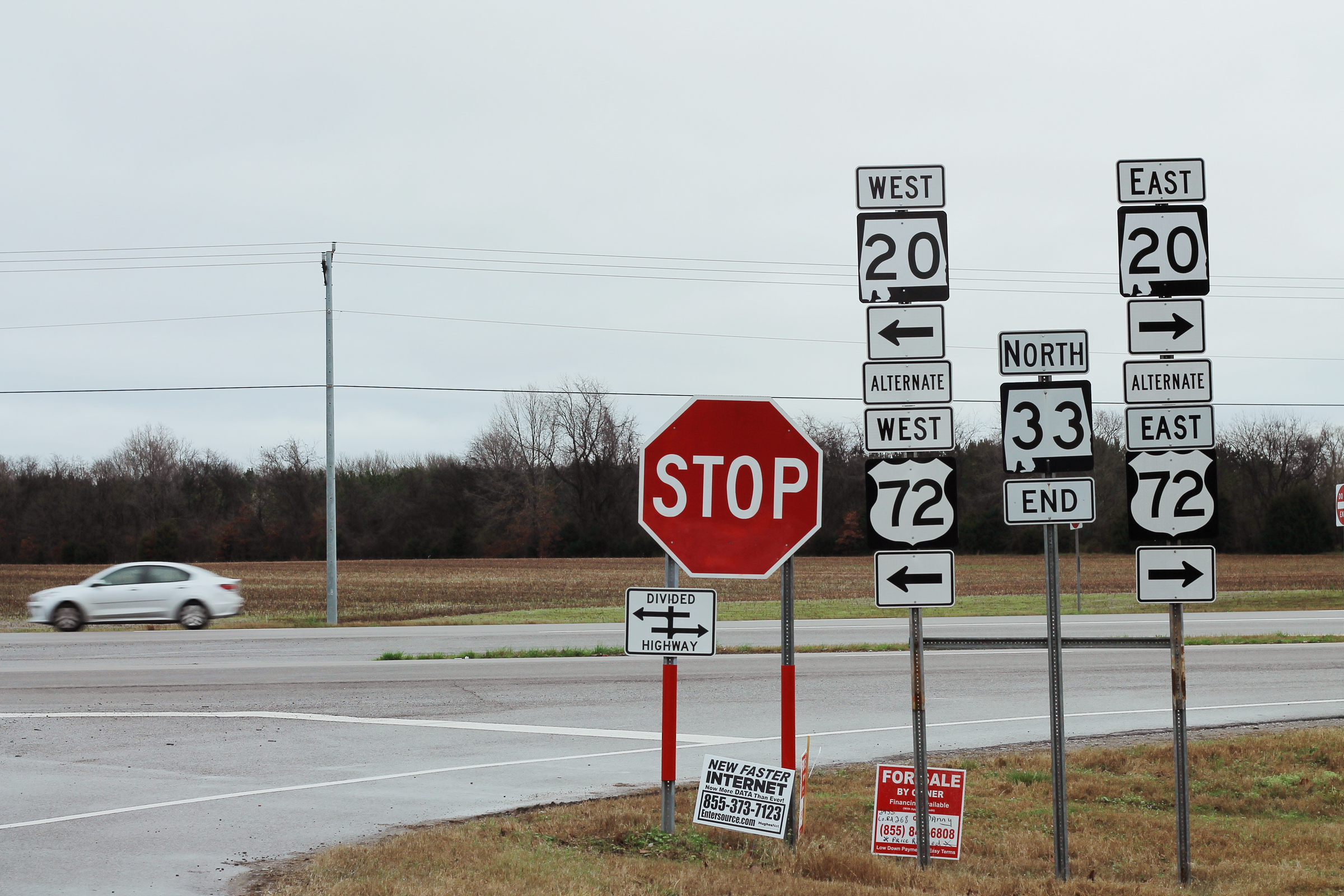
Northern terminus in Courtland

In Double Springs, SR 33 junctions with SR 195 and US 278. SR 195 continues south to Jasper on SR 33's right-of-way. SR 195 continues northwest to Haleyville at a point just west of this junction along US 278.

The route continues through the William B. Bankhead National Forest to Grayson, where it junctions with Winston County Road 63, a short-route to Houston.

The route crosses the Lawrence County line and junctions with Cranal Road, which leads to SR 195 and Haleyville. It makes multiple curves as it journeys through the forest. It makes a curve from north to the southeast and then north again as it leaves the National Forest. This curve is easily recognizable on road maps. The route descends down a hill and enters Wren, finally leaving the National Forest. It junctions with SR 36 and enters Moulton soon after. The route junctions with County Road 460, which is the old SR 24 right-of-way. The route continues north to SR 24's new alignment—a four-lane divided highway—and passes by an electrical zone. It junctions with SR 157 and leaves Moulton. The route passes through slightly curvy terrain for the next few miles, entering Courtland eventually. The route reaches its northern terminus at SR 20/US 72 Alt.

== History ==
The current incarnation of SR 33 was formed in 1957, when the route designations for SR 33 and SR 36 were swapped.

== Major intersections ==
County	Location	mi	km	Destinations	Notes
Winston	Double Springs	0.000	0.000	US 278 (SR 74) / SR 195 – Jasper, Cullman, Natural Bridge	Southern terminus
Lawrence	Wren	22.631	36.421	SR 36 east / CR 100 west – Hartselle	Western terminus of SR 36
Lawrence	Moulton	26.572	42.763	SR 24 – Russellville, Decatur	
Lawrence	Moulton	28.226	45.425	SR 157 – Florence, Cullman	
Lawrence	Courtland	39.060	62.861	US 72 Alt. / SR 20 – Tuscumbia, Florence, Decatur	Northern terminus
1.000 mi = 1.609 km; 1.000 km = 0.621 mi
