= Brewer High School =

Brewer High School may refer to:

- Brewer High School (Fort Worth, Texas)
- Brewer High School (Maine)
- Albert P. Brewer High School (Somerville, Alabama)
