= Cedar Lake, Alabama =

African American community

Cedar Lake, Alabama Decatur
- Former town
- Location within Alabama Location within the United States
- Coordinates: 34°33′16″N 86°58′25″W
- Country: United States
- State: Alabama
- County: Morgan
- Established: 1897
- Elevation: 571 ft (174 m)
- Time zone: UTC-6 (Central Time)
  - Summer (DST): UTC-5 (CDT)
- ZIP code: 35603
- Area code: 256
- GNIS feature ID: 155016

Cedar Lake was a settlement in Morgan County, Alabama inaugurated November 6, 1897. It was located within the boundaries of current day Decatur, Alabama near the Louisville & Nashville Railway covering 363 acres for both the town and for growing crops. The land was fertile and used for growing wheat, tobacco and potatoes as well as being partially heavily wooded.

== Establishment ==
The Louisville & Nashville Railway president Mr Smith offered aid to support the founding and promised to set up a depot and side tracks as well as offering shipping concessions. Mrs. Lilian K. Ray founded the community in 1897 in an experiment to determine how well a black community could self-govern. The town was run as a regular corporation with elected officers. A local congressman, Joseph Wheeler, made arrangements to open a mail station. The Alabama Governor Joseph F. Johnston appointed a notary, a justice and police constable all from the black community. Booker T. Washington took an interest in the new colony and gave material aid.

The establishment of the community gained interest across the county and was written about in The New York Times in the November 14 edition a few days after inauguration.

The founder, Mrs. Ray, was described as being a wealthy English woman and well known in both literary and financial circles. She had come to America from England around three years prior and owned an elegant home in Moulton Heights, Alabama where she had retired to. She was a writer who wrote under the alias of Jack Carleton. She stated that the new colony was not a 'business speculation' and was just an attempt to improve the lives of the black community. She gave money for the founding of a school and a church which the community built themselves and who ordained a Baptist preacher in the church. She also donated $10,000 for the building of 140 houses and then any other practical purpose.

A firm from Providence, Alabama agreed to build a cotton mill with twenty thousand spindles and another firm had agreed than if tobacco was profitable grown they would set up a cigar and tobacco factory.

Governor Robert Love Taylor expressed an interest to Mrs. Kay of making a similar colony in Tennessee.

Plans for the community came under bigoted attacks with white supremacists questioning plans for self government in an African American community. "Trying to teach a negro self-government is like casting pearls before the swine", was one statement among several other extremely negative aspersions.

== Later history ==
In 1908 it was listed as having a post office. In the 1920s, Monroe Work's Negro Yearbooks reported it had 300 residents. A Rosenwald school for the community was announced in February 1920 with T. C. Parks a prominent black educator from Huntsville donating $500 to be matched by Julius Rosenwald. Cartie Tate Lewis served as its principal of the two-room schoolhouse.

Johnson's Pond provided acted as both the main water source for the settlement but also offered recreational opportunities for picnics, fishing, swimming and also for baptisms.

By 1939 Cedar Lake had grown to 1200 acres located south of Alabama State Route 67 and was annexed into Decatur in 1967.
