= Danville High School =

Danville High School may refer to:

- Danville High School (Alabama)
- Danville High School (Arkansas)
- Danville High School (Illinois)
- Danville Community High School, a high school in Indiana
- Danville High School (Iowa)
- Danville High School (Kentucky)
- Danville High School (Ohio)
- Danville High School (Pennsylvania)
- Danville High School (Vermont)
