= Austinville, Alabama =

Austinville, Alabama Decatur
- Former town
- Location within Alabama Location within the United States
- Coordinates: 34°34′29.3″N 87°00′31.0″W
- Country: United States
- State: Alabama
- County: Morgan
- Established: 1907
- Elevation: 617 ft (188 m)
- Time zone: UTC-6 (Central Time)
  - Summer (DST): UTC-5 (CDT)
- ZIP code: 35601
- Area code: 256
- GNIS feature ID: 0113297

Austinville is a former town and now a neighborhood within the city of Decatur in Morgan County, Alabama, United States. It is about 3 miles south from downtown Decatur, centered on the junction of Danville Road and Carridale Street. It was incorporated as a town in 1907 and disincorporated and annexed into the city of Decatur in 1956.

== Geography ==
Austinville is located at 34.5748149°N 87.0086207°W, at an elevation of 617 feet (188 m).

== Demographics ==
=== Town of Austinville ===
Historical population
Census	Pop.	Note	%±
1910	671		—
1920	838		24.9%
1930	818		−2.4%
1940	790		−3.4%
1950	1,110		40.5%
U.S. Decennial Census

Austinville first appeared on the 1910 U.S. Census three years after it incorporated. It was annexed into Decatur in 1956. See also Austinville precinct below.

=== Historic demographics ===
Census Year	Population & Racial Majority	State Place Rank	County Place Rank	White	Black
1910 (Note: 1st year Austinville reported on census)	671 (-) (Note: (-)Indicates no immediate prior population figure or rank) (Note: Racial demographics not reported for places of less than 2,500 on the 1910-20 censuses or for less than 1,000 on the 1930-40 censuses.)	115th (-)	4th (-)		
1920	838 ↑	119th (Note: Tied for 119th place with Clio) ↓	4th X (Note: X Indicates no change in rank)		
1930	818 ↓	134th ↓	3rd (Note: Claimed 3rd place rank behind 2nd place Hartselle, following consolidation of Albany into Decatur) ↑		
1940	790 ↓	145th ↓	3rd X		
1950	1,110 ↑	160th ↓	3rd X	1,108 ↑ 99.8%	2 (-) 0.2%

== Austinville Precinct/Division (1910-20; 1960) ==
Historical population
Census	Pop.	Note	%±
1910	1,058		—
1920	1,670		57.8%
1960	5,563		—
U.S. Decennial Census

Austinville Precinct (Morgan County 23rd Precinct) was created and first appeared on the 1910 U.S. Census. In 1927, it and the Albany 19th precinct were annexed into the Decatur 1st precinct. In 1960, the Austinville name was attached to a newly created census division, and included the towns of Flint City and Trinity. The division was merged into the Decatur Census Division by 1970.
