= Danville High School (Alabama) =

Coordinates: 34.416°N 87.095°W

Location
- 9235 Danville Road; Danville, Alabama 35619; United States

Information
- Type: Public
- Status: 4A
- School board: Morgan County
- School district: Morgan County Schools
- CEEB code: 010830
- Principal: Marty Chambers
- Staff: 23.41 (on an FTE basis)
- Grades: 9-12
- Enrollment: 374 (2024–2025)
- Student to teacher ratio: 15.98
- Education system: Morgan County Board of Education
- Classes offered: English, AP English, Honors English, Twelfth Grade English, World History II, US History I, US History II, Algebra I, Algebra II, Pre-Calculus, Calculus BC, Biology, Advanced Biology, Advanced Chemistry, Psychology, Advanced Anatomy, Physical Science, Sociology, Weightlifting, Spanish I, Spanish II
- Colors: Purple, black, white
- Sports: Cross Country, Football, Basketball, Swim, Baseball, Track, Softball, Soccer, Volleyball and Golf
- Mascot: Hawks
- Publication: Danville High News Publication
- Yearbook: Danville High School Yearbook
- Website: dhs.morgank12.org

Danville High School is a public secondary school located in Danville, Alabama, United States; it is part of the Morgan County school system. Its student body consists primarily of the following ethnicities: white, black, and Hispanic.

== Athletics ==
Danville High School offers an interscholastic athletics program with numerous sports including baseball, basketball, football, golf, soccer, softball, and volleyball.

Football first began competing in 1976, and currently competes in region 4A-R7. The Hawks have won region championships four times including 1983, 1991, 1994, and 1995. The Hawks current head coach is Andro Williams and play in Smith-Owens Stadium.

Basketball started in 1929, the Hawks have won two state titles in basketball in 1962-63 have reached the state final four 3 more times 1992-93 and 2005. The Hawks are currently coached by Ben Mastin and play in Wayne Bowling Gymnasium.
