= Jay Burleson =

American filmmaker

- Born: Hartselle, Alabama, United States

Jay Burleson is an American filmmaker from Hartselle, Alabama.

== Features ==
=== Feast of the Vampires ===
In 2009, Burleson shot his first feature film, Feast of the Vampires. It was intended to pay homage to 1980s films such as Fright Night and The Monster Squad. In fall 2009, the film was premiered at the Southern Shorts Film Festival in Athens, Atlanta, and won the Audience Choice Award for Best Film. The film was self-released on DVD in February 2010 and later became available on Amazon and Amazon on Demand.

The film takes place in a Southern town with a vampire curse. A normal young man is trapped in a Southern plantation and must outwit an African American vampire and his Native American housekeeper in order to save a farmer's beautiful daughter with whom the young man has fallen in love. The film was transferred to VHS and is presented by a host along the lines of Robert Osborne. The film contains many camp elements and is considered a B-movie.

The film has received positive reviews from The Dollar Bin Horror Blog and Oh-The-Horror.com. Rhonny Rheaper of Dollar Bin Horror Blog called the film "A ton of fun to watch..entertaining as hell!" Brett G of Oh-The-Horror praised Burleson for creating a stylish film and commended him for working well within a very limited budget, noting, "I enjoy this kind of stuff because I like to see enthusiasm shine through; it does here in spades."

In April 2011, the film was shown on the internet version of Creature Feature which is hosted by Count Gore De Vol.

=== The Nobodies ===
In 2011, Burleson started working on a feature film titled The Nobodies, which combines pseudo-documentary sequences about the making of a fictitious low-budget horror film with sequences from the horror movie in question. The film was shot using VHS. The film stars Lane Hughes, Bill Pacer, Hannah Hughes, Neva Howell, and Danny Vinson. The Nobodies premiered in 2017 at the Sidewalk Film Festival, where it won the Special Jury Prize for Best Alabama Film.

== Filmography ==
=== As director ===
- Feast of the Vampires (2010)
- Kristin Grace from Outer Space (2010)
- "Halloween: Harvest of Souls, 1985" (2013)
- Anathema Arienette (2015)
- The Nobodies (2017)
- The Third Saturday in October (2022)
- The Third Saturday in October: Part V (2022)
- "Kenneled" (TBA)
