= WALW-LP =

Radio station in Alabama, USA

- Moulton, Alabama; United States
- Frequency: 97.9 MHz

Programming
- Format: Classic Hits

Ownership
- Owner: Community Information And Education Radio Inc.

History
- Former frequencies: 98.3 MHz (2004–2017)

Technical information
- Licensing authority: FCC
- Facility ID: 133800
- Class: L1
- ERP: 100 watts
- HAAT: 54 meters
- Transmitter coordinates: 34°28′47″N 87°17′30″W

Links
- Public license information: LMS
- Webcast: http://walw.caster.fm
- Website: http://www.walw.org/

WALW-LP (97.9 FM) is a radio station licensed to serve Moulton, Alabama, United States. The station is owned by Community Information And Education Radio Inc. It once aired an Americana music format. It currently carries a 1960s-1980s based Classic Hits Format. (Info extracted from their web site)

The station was assigned the WALW-LP call letters by the Federal Communications Commission on December 12, 2002. WALW-LP is the oldest LPFM station in Alabama.

On August 25, 2016, a construction permit was filed to relocate the station from 98.3 FM to 97.9 FM. The station filed a license to cover for the new frequency in early January, 2017, which was issued on January 12, 2017.
