= John Wallace Jones =

American judge (1822–1895)

The Honorable John Wallace Jones

Mayor of Shreveport, Louisiana
- In office 1854–1858
- President: Franklin Pierce
- Governor: Paul Octave Hébert/Robert C. Wickliffe
- Preceded by: Joseph Clinton Beall
- Succeeded by: Jonas Robeson

Personal details
- Born: March 31, 1822 Moulton, Alabama, US
- Died: September 6, 1895 (aged 73) Shreveport, Louisiana, US
- Party: American Party/Democrat
- Spouse: Elizabeth Hanson Weems
- Children: 5

Military service
- Allegiance: Confederate States of America
- Branch/service: Confederate States Army
- Years of service: 1861-1865
- Rank: Captain
- Unit: 19th Louisiana Infantry Regiment
- Battles/wars: American Civil War

John Wallace Jones (31 March 1822 – 6 September 1895) was an American attorney, judge, and civic leader. He served in various legal and political capacities, including justice of the peace, city attorney, mayor, and city councillor in Shreveport, Louisiana, and as parish attorney, district attorney, and district judge in Caddo Parish. Jones was actively involved in the American Party, reflecting his alignment with its nativist principles. He played a crucial role in advancing public health, safety, and infrastructure of Shreveport during his tenure.

== Early life ==
Born in Lawrence County, Alabama, John Wallace Jones was the fourth of six children born to Benjamin Elliott Jones and Viney Wallace, both originally from Kentucky. Details regarding John Wallace Jones's early life are sparse, but it is documented that he attended LaGrange College, where he pursued legal studies.

On 4 May 1846, John Wallace Jones was admitted to the bar in Shreveport, Louisiana, only the sixth attorney to have done so since the commencement of the parish court in August 1839. By 1850, he was residing in a boarding house with several other young attorneys, among whom was Henry M. Spofford, a New Hampshire native and future Louisiana Supreme Court Justice. In 1847, Jones was mustered into the 5th Louisiana Volunteer Infantry under Colonel Balie Peyton. Upon enlistment, he was given the rank of sergeant of Company H of that regiment. In 1853, Jones emerged in public records as serving in the capacity of Justice of the Peace. He maintained this position until November 1854, at which point he was elected mayor of Shreveport, defeating the incumbent J. C. Beall.

== As mayor of Shreveport ==
=== Infrastructure and urban development ===
John Wallace Jones played a crucial role in the enhancement of Shreveport's infrastructure during his tenure as mayor. In May 1855, he spearheaded an ordinance mandating that downtown business and property owners construct brick sidewalks, thereby improving the urban landscape. In February 1856, Jones, along with the city trustees, sanctioned the installation of culverts on Travis Street to mitigate flooding issues.

In March 1856, Jones empowered the Streets Committee to investigate potential locations for a modern wharf on the Red River, a development aimed at augmenting both revenue and efficiency for the city and its cotton industry. In May 1856, to alleviate congestion and support the town's expansion, Jones and the city trustees proposed the establishment of Sprague Street.

October 1856 saw Jones introduce stringent standards requiring property owners to grade and pave their sidewalks in accordance with city guidelines, with the threat of the city regrading at the owner's expense if these standards were not met. During the same month, Jones nominated delegates from the Shreveport Board of Trustees to attend a railroad convention in Monroe on June 30, 1857, to discuss transportation developments, underscoring his proactive approach to enhancing the city's connectivity and infrastructure. One of his final significant actions as mayor was the confirmation of a contract with A.L. Shotwell in 1857, to operate a steam ferry across the Red River for five years. This initiative was expected to significantly enhance commercial opportunities and infrastructure development between Shreveport and the emerging Bossier City on the opposite bank of the river.

=== Public health and safety ===
In July 1855, local physicians petitioned the board of trustees to drain Silver Lake for health reasons, underscoring the community's concern about public health. The city council also deliberated on the implementation of a yellow fever quarantine in October 1855, but ultimately voted against it, citing concern with the lasting economic damage a quarantine might cause. During the same month, Jones proposed an ordinance banning the sale of liquor in quantities of less than a gallon within the corporate bounds of Shreveport, effective January 1, 1856. Although this ordinance was not implemented, in the December 1855 public vote, retail liquor sales licenses were made available for $500, at least guaranteeing some compensatory profit for the city. Additionally, in January 1856, Jones proposed a $5 penalty for allowing horses to run wild in town and legislated against locking wagon wheels on the plank road within city limits. By January 1857, Jones had successfully introduced a $1 fine for roaming goats within city limits, a measure that was subsequently approved by the board.

=== Racial order regulations ===
Jones implemented several regulatory measures aimed at maintaining order within the city, with a particular focus on race relations. In September 1854, Jones advanced an ordinance stipulating that any slave proven to have sheltered, hidden, or fed a runaway slave, or any slave found wandering without proper passage documents, would be subjected to whipping and imprisonment. This ordinance exemplified the punitive measures aimed at preventing solidarity and mutual aid among enslaved individuals. The following year, in July 1855, Jones and the board of trustees published an ordinance banning any white person "from visiting the house of any negro slave [...] at an improper hour of the night," under threat of both fines and imprisonment, a clear attempt to curtail sexual relations between races in Shreveport. Later the same year, he endorsed the imposition of a $20 fine on any slave owner who permitted their slaves to "go at large and trade, or to occupy any house...as a free person." This policy underscored the rigid societal hierarchy and the control exerted over enslaved individuals' autonomy. Furthermore, in November 1856, Jones and the city trustees proposed an ordinance that strictly prohibited slaves from residing away from their owner’s premises or engaging in trade as free persons. Owners who violated this rule faced penalties. This ordinance was an explicit effort to reinforce the boundaries of the institution of slavery and prevent any semblance of economic independence among the enslaved. Additionally, free blacks were explicitly banned from residing in Shreveport, reflecting the pervasive racial discrimination and the efforts to limit the presence and influence of free African Americans within the city. These policies, enacted under Jones’s administration, were indicative of the broader socio-political climate of the period, which sought to maintain racial hierarchies and control over both enslaved and free African American populations.

=== Political engagement ===
During his tenure as mayor, Jones was actively engaged in political and community affairs, demonstrating a strong commitment to the principles of the American Party, also known as the Know Nothings. This nativist political movement emerged in the mid-19th century, advocating for stricter immigration controls and promoting the interests of native-born Americans over those of immigrants. Jones's involvement in the American Party reflected his alignment with these ideals and his dedication to shaping the political landscape of his community. In May 1856, Jones was appointed secretary of the Caddo Parish chapter of the American Party, a role that underscored his leadership and organizational skills. His responsibilities included coordinating party activities, managing communications, and mobilizing support for the party's platform. That same month, he was selected as a delegate to the American Party convention in Minden, where he represented the interests of his parish and contributed to the party's strategic planning. The Caddo Parish American Club, a local branch of the American Party, was renamed the Fillmore American Club in August 1856, reflecting the party's admiration for former President Millard Fillmore, who had run as the Know Nothing candidate in the 1856 presidential election. Jones's involvement in this rebranding effort highlighted his influence within the party and his commitment to its cause. In May 1857, Jones was named a delegate to the American Party conference in Alexandria, where he participated in the nomination of a congressional candidate. This role further demonstrated his active engagement in the political process and his dedication to advancing the party's agenda at both the local and national levels. Jones's affiliation with the American Party was a significant aspect of his political identity, shaping his actions and decisions as a public servant. His efforts to promote the party's principles and his active participation in its activities underscored his commitment to the nativist movement and his desire to influence the direction of American politics during a period of significant social and political change.

== Personal life ==
Jones's tenure as mayor lasted until 1858, when he was succeeded by Jonas Robeson. Upon retiring from the office of mayor, Jones again took up the mantle of Justice of the Peace. During this time, we also have the first evidence of Jones entering into the private practice of law, or "hanging out his own shingle" in Shreveport.

On 1 May 1860, Jones married Elizabeth Hanson Weems (6 July 1839 – 14 April 1918), the St. Francisville-born daughter of Judge James Isaac Weems (7 November 1796 – 7 March 1872) and his wife Mary Catherine "Kitty" Brandt (1 August 1800 – 16 February 1869). Both elder Weemses were natives of Port Tobacco, Maryland, who migrated to Louisiana in 1828 following Judge Weems's appointment to West Feliciana Parish magistrate. John and Elizabeth Jones had six children:

- Mary Jane "Mae" Jones (1 May 1861 – 11 July 1931)
- Hanson Weems Jones (July 1868 – 8 January 1944)
- Elizabeth "Bessie" Brandt Jones (13 July 1870 – 4 February 1872)
- Theodora Jones (1 April 1873 – 27 December 1945)
- William Weems Jones (14 July 1875 – 13 February 1949)
- Wilmer Jones (28 September 1878 – 7 July 1879)

== The war ==
On 18 September 1861, at Camp Moore, Jones was mustered into Company I of the 19th Louisiana Volunteer Infantry, known as the Keachi Warriors, at the rank of second lieutenant. His unusually high rank was due to the fact that he had previously served as a sergeant in the Mexican-American War. On 8 May 1862, Jones was promoted to first lieutenant in Company K (the Anacoco Rangers), and on 27 June, he was promoted again to captain in command of that same unit.

== Later life and death ==
Captain Jones was furloughed in January 1865 after a serious case of flux and returned to Shreveport shortly thereafter. By June 1865, he had resumed the practice of law. In July of that same year, Jones was appointed Justice of the Peace, along with J. C. Beall, but both declined to accept their appointments. The following month, Jones was appointed by a unanimous vote of the Trustees of the city of Shreveport to the position of city attorney. In 1869, while still acting in his capacity as city attorney, Jones was elected to the Shreveport board of trustees (effectively the city council), which position he held until the following year. As a result of his Methodist-Episcopal upbringing, and in keeping with the anti-alcohol stance of his professed American Party, Jones took it upon himself to introduce, in the first session of the newly elected board, motions to levy taxes on gambling halls and to curtail the rampant growth of brothels to a finite area. Two months later, the Shreveport board of trustees promulgated an ordinance banning "houses of ill-fame" within the precinct of the city of Shreveport bound by Common, Commerce, Fannin and Cotton Streets. By May 1871, Jones was no longer a member of the board of trustees, but the circumstances of his removal or loss in an election are unclear. In September 1872, the city and parish government had been restructured again, such that the Board of Trustees was now formally known as a City Council; the restructuring had also created the new position of Parish Attorney, who was answerable directly to the Caddo Parish Police Jury, and whose first occupant was John W. Jones. From 1873 to 1878, Jones appears only sporadically in the newspapers, and never in a professional capacity, implying his retirement from the practice of law. In 1878, he again appeared as a private citizen, having been appointed to a yellow fever relief committee, representing his native ward.

The Louisiana Constitution of 1879 abolished parish courts and necessitated a restructuring of the legal mechanism in the state. As a result, Jones was provisionally appointed "additional judge" of the First District, consisting of Caddo Parish, in 1879. He was formally elected to the position in 1882 and presided over the criminal division until the next election in 1884. Because Judge Jones's appointment was somewhat irregular, rather than filling a vacancy, he entered a position created of whole cloth, not in line with the existing judicial election cycle, there was a concern that Jones would not stand for re-election in 1884, but rather retain his position until 1886. An anonymous member of the Shreveport Bar penned the following endorsement of Judge Jones in the leadup to the 1884 judicial election, which gives insight into how Jones was perceived by his peers:

It is in his judicial capacity that we see the true qualities and superiority of the man. As a judge, he is upright, impartial, independent, fearless, and decisive in the discharge of his official duties. His judgments on the law and the evidence before him are his honest convictions, which cannot be moved or changed by outside animadversions or criticisms, whether coming from the bar or any other class of men. Judge Jones administers justice, according to law, and not according to his individual notions of equity or what the law of the case ought to be. He indulges in no presumption of fact against a party which the law itself does not create against him. He makes no distinctions in the law against a party which the law itself does not make. He writes no long, plausible opinions, which are really nothing but arguments in favor of the party to whom he gives his judgment and against the other party to the litigation. But Judge Jones, on the contrary, satisfies himself with his judgment by reason of the law and the evidence before him, which will go before the appellate court as they really are, without any coloring from his judicial, official pen.

— Lawyer

Despite the obvious esteem in which Judge Jones was held by his peers, in the 1884 election he was unseated by A.W.O. Hicks. Jones contested that decision, which led to a formal case being filed, which was tried before Judge Pike Hall (father of William Pike Hall Sr.). Judge Hall ended up deciding in favor of Hicks, effectively ending Jones's career in the judiciary, but without any animosity on the part of either party. That amity, however, did not extend to all parts of the legal community. At the nominating convention of 1888, Hicks was again the selected nominee for the position of "additional judge," but in this instance, apparently, Jones took umbrage and began campaigning for himself under the noses of his legal compatriots. This confrontation led to a series of letters in the local newspaper from both Jones and his detractors, calling into question one another's characters, motives, and stooping to outright accusations of fraud and election tampering.

Despite his advancing age, in 1891, Jones announced himself as a candidate for the position of representative in the state legislature. Unfortunately, Jones came in third in the democratic primary and was unable to realize his political aspirations. However, Jones did not let that defeat quash his ambition, and in 1894 he again announced his candidacy, this time for judge of the First Judicial District, the same position that he lost to Hicks in 1882 amid such vitriol in the papers. Unfortunately for Jones, he again did not make it past the primary, and this final election ended his political career.

John W. Jones died at his home on 6 September 1895 following a sudden onset attack of gastroenteritis. His funeral took place at the old St. Mark's Church on the corner of Fannin and Market Streets, which was "filled nearly to its entire capacity by a vast throng of citizens." He was buried with Masonic honors in Shreveport's Oakland Cemetery on 8 September 1895, in the presence of his widow and all of his living children.
