= Six Mile, Alabama =

- Unincorporated community
- Location within Alabama Location within the United States
- Coordinates: 34°25′26″N 86°45′23″W
- Country: United States
- State: Alabama
- County: Morgan
- Elevation: 620 ft (190 m)
- Time zone: UTC-6 (Central (CST))
  - Summer (DST): UTC-5 (CDT)
- ZIP code: 35670 (Somerville)
- Area code: 256
- GNIS feature ID: 157067

Six Mile is an unincorporated community in Morgan County, Alabama, United States. It is served by the zip code for the nearby town of Somerville.
