= Six Way, Alabama =

- Unincorporated community
- Location within Alabama Location within the United States
- Coordinates: 34°31′28″N 86°52′58″W
- Country: United States
- State: Alabama
- County: Morgan
- Elevation: 745 ft (227 m)
- Time zone: UTC-6 (Central (CST))
  - Summer (DST): UTC-5 (CDT)
- Area code: 256
- GNIS feature ID: 126918

Six Way is an unincorporated community in Morgan County, Alabama, United States.
