= West Morgan High School =

Location
- 261 South Greenway Dr; Trinity, Alabama 35673; United States; 34°35′06″N 87°04′44″W

Information
- School type: Public
- Established: 1961 (65 years ago)
- School district: Morgan County Schools
- CEEB code: 012660
- Principal: Keith Harris
- Teaching staff: 25.91 (on an FTE basis)
- Enrollment: 486 (2023–2024)
- Student to teacher ratio: 18.76
- Colors: Maroon and gray
- Team name: Rebels
- Website: wmhs.morgank12.org

West Morgan High School is a public high school at 261 South Greenway Drive in Trinity, Alabama. It is part of the Morgan County Schools. In 2021 it had 375 students in grades 9-12.

Built in 1961, the school is the home to the Rebels. The team colors are maroon and gray.

In 2022 the school's student body was about 59 percent White, 33 percent Hispanic, and 6.4 percent Black.

== See also ==
- List of high schools in Alabama
