= Penn, Alabama =

- Unincorporated community
- Location within Alabama Location within the United States
- Coordinates: 34°21′22.35″N 87°05′0.04″W
- Country: United States
- State: Alabama
- County: Morgan
- Elevation: 630 ft (192 m)
- Time zone: UTC-6 (Central (CST))
  - Summer (DST): UTC-5 (CDT)
- ZIP code: 35619
- Area code: 256
- GNIS feature ID: 160358

Penn (/ˈpɛnn/) is an unincorporated community in southwestern Morgan County, Alabama, United States, south of Danville and near the county lines with Lawrence County and Cullman County.

== History ==
Originally known as Basham's Gap (/ˈbæsˌhæms ˈɡæp/) (spelled Bassham's Gap in the earliest records), the community was settled around 1818, taking its name from the nearby mountain pass climbing steeply into the mountains of the Cumberland Plateau. An early reference to the community appears in an 1837 act of the Alabama Assembly, "An Act to establish a Public Road from Bassham's Gap in Morgan County to the dividing line between Walker and Tuscaloosa counties by the way of Jasper and James Cain in Walker county" (approved 25 December 1837).

A post office operated under the name Basham's Gap from 1847 to 1895 and under the name Basham from 1895 to 1907.

The community later became known as Penn, after Penn's School, a school in the community founded by Dr. Richard L. Penn.

=== Postmasters ===
- 1847–1866: James H. Basham
- 1866–1869: Mary A. Simpson
- 1869–1871: Doke W. Sherrill
- 1871: Sarah F. Basham
- 1871–1873: Sylvanus Gibson
- 1873–1882: Wiley B. Sherrill
- 1882–1888: John D. Sherrill
- 1888–1894: Sylvanus L. Sherrill (post office name shorted to "Basham")
- 1894–1895: Rather S. Sherrill
- 1895–1900: Martin T. Roden
- 1900–1901: David R. James
- 1901–1902: James D. Segars
- 1902–1903: Thomas J. Segars
- 1903–1904: Maggie Jones
- 1904–1907: Jennie Bennett
- 1907: Post office discontinued and mail sent to Danville.
