= Harold Raley =

American Hispanist, philosopher and writer (1934–2024)

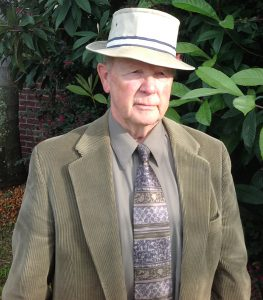
Harold Raley

Harold Cecil Raley (November 23, 1934 – August 21, 2024) was an American Hispanist, philosopher and writer. During his life he was a university professor, though he was best known as a scholar and translator of the work of Julián Marías.

== Biography ==
Harold Cecil Raley was born November 23, 1934, near Hartselle, Alabama. He grew up working in a rural community in Winston County, Alabama. He was descended from Walter Raleigh, through the patrilineal line.

Raley received his doctorate from the University of Alabama with a thesis on the work of José Ortega y Gasset. He had been a professor at the University of Oklahoma, as well as at the University of Houston, and dean and professor at Houston Baptist University (named "Distinguished Professor"). He was, according to Julián Marías, "the best Hispanist of our time".

Raley married Victoria González in 1962. They raised three children: Laura, Ana, and David. Raley died on August 21, 2024, at the age of 89.

== Thinking ==
According to José Luis Pinillos, "Raley shares with Ortega and Marías the idea that the point of view constitutes an essential ingredient of reality." Raley disagrees with Nelson Orringer, Ciriaco Morón Arroyo, Molinuevo and others, who considered, in general, that Ortega repeated in Spanish what he had learned in Germany, but states that the philosopher from Madrid began, disagreeing with his Germanic sources, another path, a "turning point": Ortega abandoned phenomenology as soon as he received it, and therefore did not have a "phenomenological" phase, but much of his work was devoted to overcoming it. Raley also shows how Ortega found the epokhé or phenomenological reduction impossible: for Ortega the primary datum is not the consciousness of phenomena, but the living man or woman, the person that I am: "the "consciousness of phenomena", but rather the living man or woman, the person that I am".

== Work ==
- Ortega y Gasset, filósofo de la unidad europea (prólogo de Julián Marías), traducción española de Ernestina de Champourcín, Revista de Occidente, Madrid, 1977. ISBN 84-292-8735-3. Edición inglesa: José Ortega y Gasset, the Philosopher of European Unity. The University of Alabama Press, Alabama, 1971. ISBN 0-8173-6612-1
- La visión responsable. La filosofía de Julián Marías (prólogo de José Luis Pinillos), traducción española de César Armando Gómez, Espasa-Calpe, Madrid, 1977. ISBN 84-239-2026-7. Edición inglesa: Responsible Vision: The Philosophy of Julián Marías, The American Hispanist, Indiana, 1980. ISBN 0892170050
- Julián Marías. Una filosofía desde dentro, traducción española de César Armando Gómez, Alianza Editorial, Madrid, 1997. ISBN 84-206-2866-2; edición inglesa: A Watch over Mortality: the Philosophical Story of Julián Marías, The State University of New York Press, Albany, 1997. ISBN 0-7914-3154-1
- El espíritu de España (prólogo de Julián Marías), traducción española de César Armando Gómez, Alianza Editorial, Madrid, 2003. ISBN 84-206-7734-5. Edición inglesa: The Spirit of Spain, Halcyon Press, Houston, 2002. ISBN 0970605498
- The Light of Eden. A Christian Worldview (foreword by David B. Capes, Ph.D., chair of Christianity and Philosophy, Houston Baptist University), John M. Hardy Publishing, Houston, 2008. ISBN 0-9798391-2-2
- The Unknown God: Mysteries of Deity, Time, Space, and Creation, Createspace Independent Publishing Platform, North Charleston, 2011. ISBN 1466273186. Traducción española de Enrique González Fernández: El Dios desconocido, TotallRecalll Publications, Friendswood, 2019. ISBN 978-1-59095-416-4
- Immortal Destiny, TotalRecall Publications, Friendswood, 2018. ISBN 978-1-59095-443-0
- Language Oddities. Quirks and Curiosities of English and Other Languages, Kingsle, Houston, 2011. ISBN 978-0-9830676-6-5
- Louisiana Rogue. The Life and Times of Pierre Prospère-Tourmoulin translated by Peter Tourmoulin, Lamar University Press, Beaumont, Texas, 2013. ISBN 978-0-9852552-7-5
- José Ortega y Gasset: a bibliography of secondary sources (with Antón Donoso), Bowling Green State University, Ohio, 1986. ISBN 091263281X
- Radical and Empirical Reality. Selected Writings on the Philosophy of José Ortega y Gasset and Julián Marías, TotalRecall Publications, Friendswood, 2020. ISBN 978-1-64883-0167

== Translations ==
- Julián Marías: America in the Fifties and Sixties: Julián Marías on the United States (translated from the Spanish by Blanche De Puy and Harold C. Raley; edited and with an Introduction by Michael Aaron Rockland), The Pennsylvania State University Press, University Park and London, 1972. ISBN 0-271-00556-4
- Julián Marías: A Biography of Philosophy (translated by Harold C. Raley), The University of Alabama Press, Alabama, 1984. ISBN 0817301801
- Julián Marías: The structure of society (translated by Harold C. Raley; introduction by Robert K. Merton), The University of Alabama Press, Alabama, 1987. ISBN 081730181X
- Julián Marías: Generations: a historical method (translated by Harold C. Raley), The University of Alabama Press, Alabama, 1970. ISBN 0817366113
- Julián Marías: The Christian Perspective (translated from Spanish by Harold Raley), Halcyon Press, Houston, 2000. ISBN 0-9706054-0-4
- Enrique González Fernández: The Beauty of Christ. A philosophical understanding of the Gospel (prologue by Julián Marías, Royal Spanish Academy, translated from the Spanish by Harold C. Raley), Cultiva, Madrid, 2011. ISBN 978-84-9923-546-2

== Prologues ==
- Julián Marías: Historia de la filosofía (prologue with Xavier Zubiri; epilogue with José Ortega y Gasset), Alianza Editorial, Madrid, 2016. ISBN 978-84-9104-430-7
- Enrique González Fernández: Julián Marías, apóstol de la divina razón, San Pablo, Madrid, 2017. ISBN 978-84-285-5272-1
