= Jill Alper =

American political consultant

- Born: September 12, 1965 (age 60)
- Education: Boston College
- Occupation: Electoral strategist
- Political party: Democratic Party
- Website: www.deweysquare.com

Jill Alper (born September 12, 1965) is an American political consultant. She founded Alper Strategies & Media, a media firm, in 2016. She also served as the head of Dewey Square Groups' campaign and integrated media practice.

== Career ==
Alper served as an electoral strategist for the presidential campaigns of Bill Clinton, where she served as the Democratic National Committee (DNC) Political Director, and of Al Gore, where she coordinated state-specific media efforts, ran election day and started the recount effort. She was the electoral strategist for John Kerry, for whom she put together nomination and general election state plans.

Alper started in politics at age 15 when she met Massachusetts Governor Mike Dukakis as a result of her lawsuit against Senate President William M. Bulger, who refused to hire women to serve as Senate pages. The suit was eventually dropped when Bulger hired a woman after sustained media attention.

In the 1992 election cycle, she was Deputy Political Director and ran candidate recruitment and incumbent protection efforts for the Democratic Senatorial Campaign Committee (DSCC).

She later served as the Deputy Iowa Field Director for Dukakis' presidential campaign.

She served as a strategist to Detroit Mayor Dave Bing and Governor Jennifer Granholm of Michigan in both of her races and is a member of the Democratic National Committee.

In 1989, Alper co-founded the Women's Information Network. In 1993, she received the Women of Distinction Award from the American Association of University Women. In 2010, she was named to the Aristotle Campaign Dream Team.

Alper has been highlighted by Politico as a "Featured Caucus Member" in their American politics blog the Politico Caucus.

== 2016 Election ==
In the 2016 Democratic Party presidential primaries, Alper served as one of Michigan's 17 superdelegates. She pledged support to Democratic Presidential Candidate Hillary Clinton.

== Personal life ==
In 2004, Alper married David Katz. A former Deputy Wayne County Executive for Edward H. McNamara, Katz also managed the gubernatorial campaign of Attorney General Jennifer Granholm in 2002. They reside in Grosse Pointe, Michigan, with their son and stepson.
