= Brooksville, Morgan County, Alabama =

Brooksville, Alabama
- Unincorporated community
- Location within Alabama Location within the United States
- Coordinates: 34°30′03″N 86°51′18″W
- Country: United States
- State: Alabama
- County: Morgan
- Elevation: 814 ft (248 m)
- Time zone: UTC-6 (Central (CST))
  - Summer (DST): UTC-5 (CDT)
- Area codes: 256 & 938
- GNIS feature ID: 114970

Brooksville is an unincorporated community in Morgan County, Alabama, United States. Brooksville is located along Alabama State Route 67, 2.8 miles (4.5 km) southeast of Priceville. In 1999 Brooksville attempted to incorporate itself. Proponents of the move stated that the laws of the community would be based on the King James Bible and the Ten Commandments.
