= Pence, Alabama =

- Unincorporated community
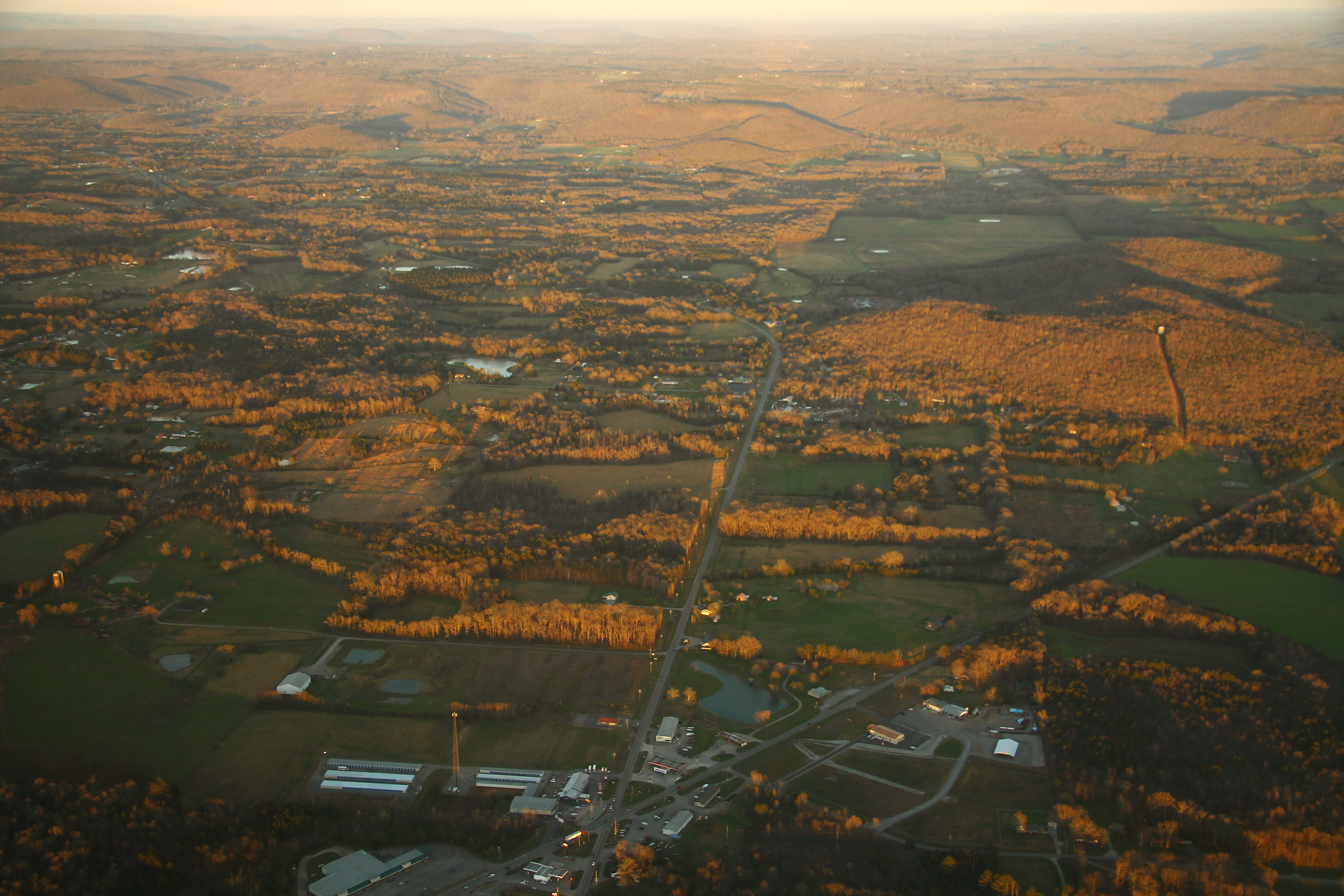
- Aerial view of the surrounding area. Pence is located at the intersection of Alabama State Routes 36/67 at the bottom center.

- Location within Alabama Location within the United States
- Coordinates: 34°26′57″N 86°45′32″W
- Country: United States
- State: Alabama
- County: Morgan
- Elevation: 627 ft (191 m)
- Time zone: UTC-6 (Central (CST))
  - Summer (DST): UTC-5 (CDT)
- Area code: 256
- GNIS feature ID: 139566

Pence is an unincorporated community in Morgan County, Alabama, United States.
