= Massey, Alabama =

- Unincorporated community
- Location within Alabama Location within the United States
- Coordinates: 34°22′13″N 87°01′20″W
- Country: United States
- State: Alabama
- County: Morgan
- Elevation: 614 ft (187 m)
- Time zone: UTC-6 (Central (CST))
  - Summer (DST): UTC-5 (CDT)
- Area codes: 256 & 938
- GNIS feature ID: 160053

Massey (also McKendra, McKendree, McKendry) is an unincorporated community in Morgan County, Alabama, United States.
