= Moulton, Alabama =

City in Alabama, United States

- City
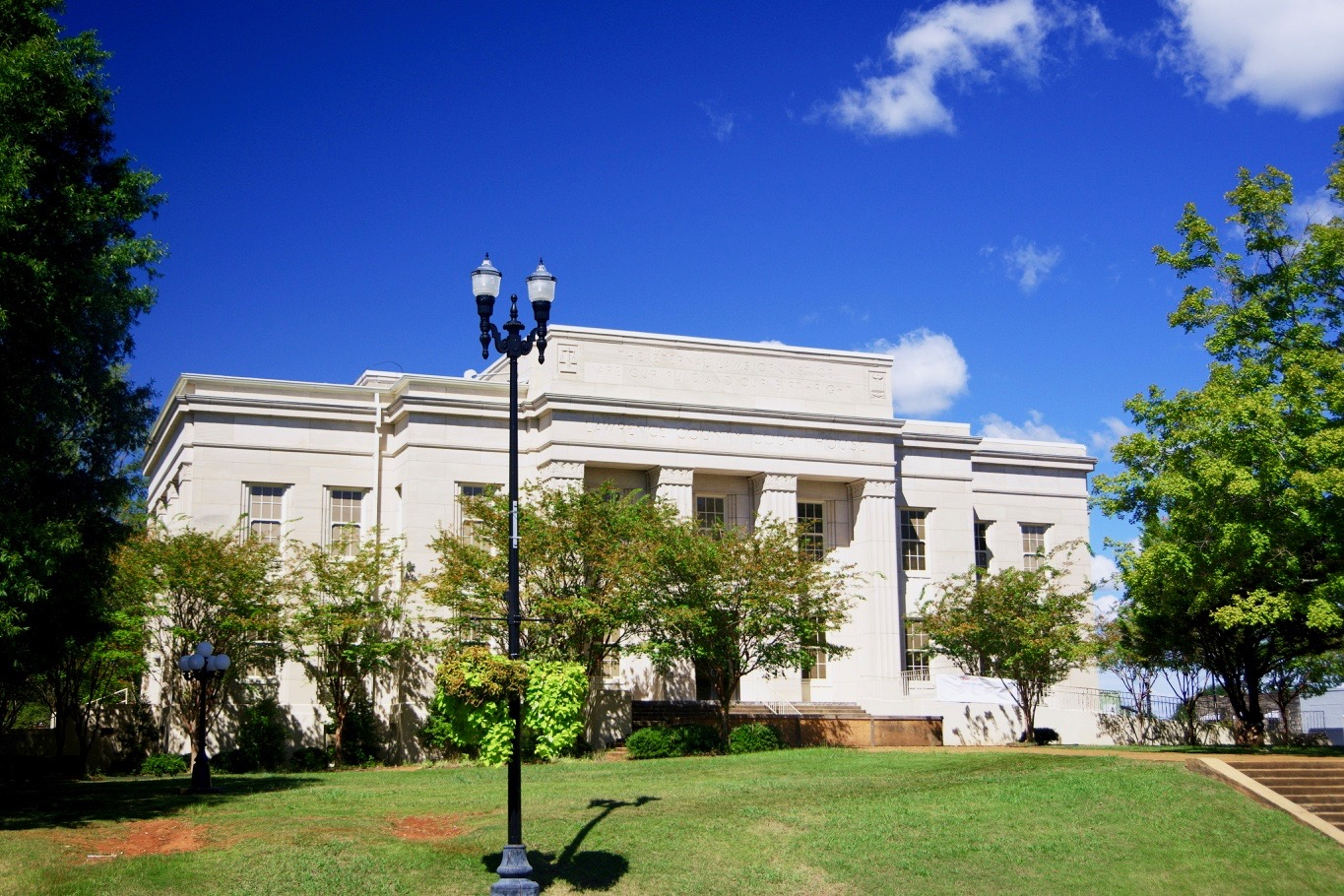
- Lawrence County Courthouse

- Location of Moulton in Lawrence County, Alabama.
- Coordinates: 34°28′56″N 87°17′8″W
- Country: United States
- State: Alabama
- County: Lawrence
- Incorporated: December 17, 1819

Area
  - Total: 6.01 sq mi (15.56 km^{2})
  - Land: 6.00 sq mi (15.53 km^{2})
  - Water: 0.015 sq mi (0.04 km^{2})
- Elevation: 643 ft (196 m)

Population (2020)
  - Total: 3,398
  - Density: 566.9/sq mi (218.87/km^{2})
- Time zone: UTC-6 (Central (CST))
  - Summer (DST): UTC-5 (CDT)
- ZIP code: 35650
- Area code: 256
- FIPS code: 01-51600
- GNIS feature ID: 2404314
- Website: cityofmoultonal.com

Moulton is a city in Lawrence County, Alabama, and is included in the Decatur Metropolitan Area, as well as the Huntsville-Decatur Combined Statistical Area. Although it incorporated in 1819, along with its rival of Courtland, to compete for the honor of county seat, it did not first appear on the U.S. Census rolls until 1900. As of the 2020 census, Moulton had a population of 3,398. The city has been the county seat of Lawrence County since 1820. It has been the largest community in the county since the 1920 U.S. Census.

== History ==
By the time Alabama became a state in 1819, an inn had been erected at the site of what is now Moulton to serve migrants along the various early paths that passed through the area. Shortly after Alabama achieved statehood, both Moulton and Courtland (to the north) incorporated and competed for the county seat of Lawrence County. Governor Thomas Bibb awarded the seat to Moulton as the most centrally located of the two within the county. The city is named for Lieutenant Michael Moulton, a soldier killed while fighting under General Andrew Jackson at the Battle of Horseshoe Bend in 1814.

== Geography ==
Moulton is concentrated along Alabama State Route 33 southwest of Decatur. Alabama State Route 24 passes through the northern part of the city, and Alabama State Route 157 passes through its eastern section. The William B. Bankhead National Forest lies to the southwest of Moulton.

According to the U.S. Census Bureau, the city has a total area of 5.9 square miles (15 km^{2}), all land.

=== Climate ===
According to the Köppen climate classification, Moulton has a humid subtropical climate (abbreviated Cfa).

Climate data for Moulton, Alabama, 1991–2020 normals, extremes 1957–present
Month	Jan	Feb	Mar	Apr	May	Jun	Jul	Aug	Sep	Oct	Nov	Dec	Year
Record high °F (°C)	78 (26)	85 (29)	87 (31)	90 (32)	96 (36)	103 (39)	106 (41)	103 (39)	102 (39)	96 (36)	86 (30)	79 (26)	106 (41)
Mean maximum °F (°C)	69.8 (21.0)	74.2 (23.4)	80.6 (27.0)	84.7 (29.3)	88.8 (31.6)	93.4 (34.1)	95.5 (35.3)	95.7 (35.4)	92.9 (33.8)	86.3 (30.2)	78.2 (25.7)	70.7 (21.5)	97.3 (36.3)
Mean daily maximum °F (°C)	50.6 (10.3)	54.8 (12.7)	63.4 (17.4)	72.0 (22.2)	79.1 (26.2)	85.8 (29.9)	88.4 (31.3)	88.4 (31.3)	83.6 (28.7)	73.5 (23.1)	61.9 (16.6)	53.2 (11.8)	71.2 (21.8)
Daily mean °F (°C)	40.3 (4.6)	43.8 (6.6)	51.9 (11.1)	60.3 (15.7)	68.3 (20.2)	75.3 (24.1)	78.4 (25.8)	77.8 (25.4)	72.1 (22.3)	61.0 (16.1)	50.1 (10.1)	42.9 (6.1)	60.2 (15.7)
Mean daily minimum °F (°C)	30.0 (−1.1)	32.9 (0.5)	40.3 (4.6)	48.6 (9.2)	57.4 (14.1)	64.9 (18.3)	68.4 (20.2)	67.2 (19.6)	60.7 (15.9)	48.5 (9.2)	38.3 (3.5)	32.6 (0.3)	49.2 (9.5)
Mean minimum °F (°C)	12.6 (−10.8)	16.9 (−8.4)	22.4 (−5.3)	31.7 (−0.2)	42.3 (5.7)	54.1 (12.3)	60.6 (15.9)	58.8 (14.9)	45.8 (7.7)	32.1 (0.1)	22.3 (−5.4)	18.2 (−7.7)	9.9 (−12.3)
Record low °F (°C)	−13 (−25)	−8 (−22)	0 (−18)	23 (−5)	33 (1)	41 (5)	52 (11)	50 (10)	35 (2)	25 (−4)	12 (−11)	−5 (−21)	−13 (−25)
Average precipitation inches (mm)	5.33 (135)	5.63 (143)	5.72 (145)	5.45 (138)	5.18 (132)	4.57 (116)	5.06 (129)	4.25 (108)	4.05 (103)	4.21 (107)	4.37 (111)	6.39 (162)	60.21 (1,529)
Average snowfall inches (cm)	0.5 (1.3)	0.9 (2.3)	0.5 (1.3)	0.0 (0.0)	0.0 (0.0)	0.0 (0.0)	0.0 (0.0)	0.0 (0.0)	0.0 (0.0)	0.0 (0.0)	0.0 (0.0)	0.2 (0.51)	2.1 (5.41)
Average precipitation days (≥ 0.01 in)	11.9	11.6	12.7	9.7	10.4	10.6	11.3	9.6	7.6	7.6	8.9	12.0	123.9
Average snowy days (≥ 0.1 in)	0.4	0.4	0.2	0.0	0.0	0.0	0.0	0.0	0.0	0.0	0.0	0.3	1.3
Source 1: NOAA
Source 2: National Weather Service

== Demographics ==
Historical population
Census	Pop.	Note	%±
1900	290		—
1910	354		22.1%
1920	519		46.6%
1930	639		23.1%
1940	752		17.7%
1950	1,384		84.0%
1960	1,716		24.0%
1970	2,470		43.9%
1980	3,197		29.4%
1990	3,248		1.6%
2000	3,260		0.4%
2010	3,471		6.5%
2020	3,398		−2.1%
U.S. Decennial Census; 2013 Estimate

=== 2020 census ===
As of the 2020 census, there were 3,398 people, 1,474 households, and 815 families residing in the city.

The median age was 45.2 years. 19.7% of residents were under the age of 18 and 22.9% of residents were 65 years of age or older. For every 100 females there were 88.6 males, and for every 100 females age 18 and over there were 84.0 males age 18 and over.

0.0% of residents lived in urban areas, while 100.0% lived in rural areas.

There were 1,474 households, of which 26.9% had children under the age of 18 living in them. Of all households, 38.1% were married-couple households, 18.5% were households with a male householder and no spouse or partner present, and 38.4% were households with a female householder and no spouse or partner present. About 37.3% of all households were made up of individuals and 17.3% had someone living alone who was 65 years of age or older.

There were 1,605 housing units, of which 8.2% were vacant. The homeowner vacancy rate was 1.2% and the rental vacancy rate was 7.4%.

Moulton racial composition
Race	Num.	Perc.
White (non-Hispanic)	2,474	72.81%
Black or African American (non-Hispanic)	416	12.24%
Native American	99	2.91%
Asian	20	0.59%
Pacific Islander	1	0.03%
Other/Mixed	223	6.56%
Hispanic or Latino	165	4.86%

=== 2010 census ===
As of the census of 2010, there were 3,471 people, 1,482 households, and 912 families residing in the city. The population density was 552.1 inhabitants per square mile (213.2/km^{2}). There were 1,486 housing units at an average density of 251.7 per square mile (97.2/km^{2}). The racial makeup of the city was 78.2% White, 13.1% Black or African American, 4.1% Native American, 0.4% Asian, 0.2% from other races, and 4.1% from two or more races. 1.6% of the population were Hispanic or Latino of any race.

There were 1,482 households, out of which 25.4% had children under the age of 18 living with them, 43.7% were married couples living together, 14.0% had a female householder with no husband present, and 38.5% were non-families. 36.1% of all households were made up of individuals, and 18.1% had someone living alone who was 65 years of age or older. The average household size was 2.19 and the average family size was 2.84.

In the city, the population was spread out, with 20.7% under the age of 18, 7.6% from 18 to 24, 26.7% from 25 to 44, 23.1% from 45 to 64, and 21.8% who were 65 years of age or older. The median age was 41 years. For every 100 females, there were 81.7 males. For every 100 females age 18 and over, there were 77.2 males.

The median income for a household in the city was $32,639, and the median income for a family was $49,243. Males had a median income of $52,279 versus $30,000 for females. The per capita income for the city was $20,696. About 8.3% of families and 15.8% of the population were below the poverty line, including 23.9% of those under age 18 and 15.2% of those age 65 or over.

== Media ==
Moulton is home to one radio station, WALW-LP (97.9 FM)

The county's only newspaper, The Moulton Advertiser, resides in Moulton.

In the 1976 Arnold Schwarzenegger film, Stay Hungry, the character Newton, played by Roger Mosley, references Moulton as a place where he wishes to move and own a large chicken farm.

== Transportation ==
=== State highways ===
- SR 24
- SR 33 (Market Street)
- SR 36
- SR 157

== Notable people ==
- Jim Blevins, former Head Football Coach at Jacksonville State University from 1965 to 1968.
- Edward B. Almon, U.S. Representative representing Alabama's 8th congressional district from 1915 to 1933.
- Lucas Black, actor, notably in Friday Night Lights and Fast and the Furious: Tokyo Drift
- Mary Lee Cagle, one of the first influential women and pastors in the Church of the Nazarene
- Kimberley Conrad (born 1963), American model and actress, wife of Hugh Hefner (1989-2010)
- Asa Hodges, U.S. representative from Arkansas.
- John Wallace Jones, Mayor of Shreveport, Louisiana from 1854 to 1858.
- Thomas Minott Peters, lawyer and botanist
- Phillip Roddey, brigadier general in the army of the Confederate States of America during the American Civil War
- David Stewart, American football offensive tackle
