= Moulton Heights, Alabama =

- Unincorporated community
- Location within Alabama Location within the United States
- Coordinates: 34°35′50″N 87°00′52″W
- Country: United States
- State: Alabama
- County: Morgan
- Elevation: 614 ft (187 m)
- Time zone: UTC-6 (Central (CST))
  - Summer (DST): UTC-5 (CDT)
- Area code: 256
- GNIS feature ID: 123135

Moulton Heights is an unincorporated community suburb of Decatur in Morgan County, Alabama, United States, and is included in the Huntsville-Decatur Combined Statistical Area, as well as the Decatur Metropolitan Area. Moulton Heights is surrounded by the city of Decatur, Alabama, and The Beltline (Alabama 67).

Moulton Heights is bordered to the west by Beltline Road (a bypass built and owned by the City of Decatur), and the north, east, and south by the City of Decatur. Certain zoning ordinances put in place by Decatur stall the process of Decatur absorbing Moulton Heights, because of the proximity between industries, residential areas, businesses, and schools.

== See also ==
- Decatur, Alabama Metropolitan Area
