= Morgan County, Alabama =

County in Alabama, United States

- County
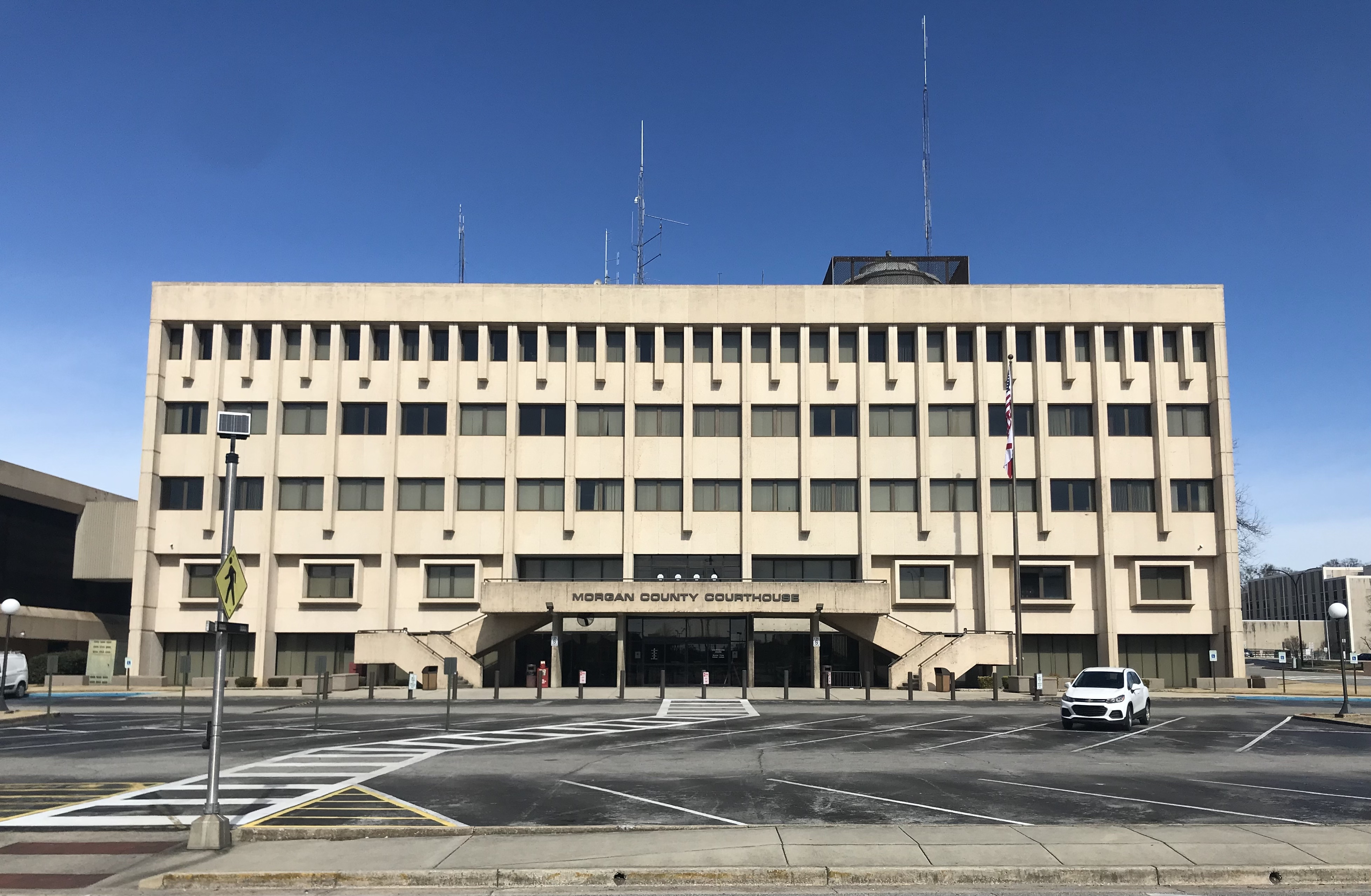
- Morgan County Courthouse in Decatur

- Seal

- Location within the U.S. state of Alabama
- Coordinates: 34°27′06″N 86°51′26″W
- Country: United States
- State: Alabama
- Founded: February 6, 1818
- Named for: Daniel Morgan
- Seat: Decatur
- Largest city: Decatur

Area
  - Total: 599 sq mi (1,550 km^{2})
  - Land: 579 sq mi (1,500 km^{2})
  - Water: 20 sq mi (52 km^{2}) 3.3%

Population (2020)
  - Total: 123,421
  - Estimate (2025): 126,483 ▲
  - Density: 213/sq mi (82.3/km^{2})
- Time zone: UTC−6 (Central)
  - Summer (DST): UTC−5 (CDT)
- Congressional district: 5th
- Website: morgancounty-al.gov
- County Number 52 on Alabama Licence Plates

Morgan County is a county in the north-central part of the U.S. state of Alabama. As of the 2020 census, its population was 123,421. The county seat is Decatur. On June 14, 1821, it was renamed in honor of American Revolutionary War General Daniel Morgan of Virginia. It is a prohibition or dry county, although alcohol sales are allowed in the cities of Decatur, Hartselle, and Priceville. Morgan County is included in the Decatur, AL Metropolitan Statistical Area, which is also included in the Huntsville-Decatur-Albertville, AL Combined Statistical Area. It is a part of the North, Northwest, and North-Central regions of Alabama.

== History ==
The county was created by the Alabama territorial legislature on February 6, 1818, from land acquired from the Cherokee people in the Treaty of Turkeytown, and was originally called Cotaco County.

== 2020 shooting ==
On June 4, 2020, one of the deadliest single location mass shootings in Alabama's history occurred when two gunman killed seven in a house in Valhermoso Springs and set the interior of the house on fire. It was the deadliest mass shooting in Alabama since the Geneva County Massacre as well as the deadliest mass shooting to occur in 2020.

== Geography ==
According to the United States Census Bureau, the county has a total area of 599 square miles (1,550 km^{2}), of which 20 square miles (52 km^{2}) (3.3%) are covered by water.

=== River ===
- Tennessee River

=== Adjacent counties ===
- Madison County (northeast)
- Marshall County (east)
- Cullman County (south)
- Lawrence County (west)
- Limestone County (northwest)

=== National protected area ===
- Wheeler National Wildlife Refuge (part)

== Demographics ==
Historical population
| Census | Pop. | Note | %± |
|---|---|---|---|
| 1820 | 5,263 | | — |
| 1830 | 9,062 | | 72.2% |
| 1840 | 9,841 | | 8.6% |
| 1850 | 10,125 | | 2.9% |
| 1860 | 11,335 | | 12.0% |
| 1870 | 12,187 | | 7.5% |
| 1880 | 16,428 | | 34.8% |
| 1890 | 24,089 | | 46.6% |
| 1900 | 28,820 | | 19.6% |
| 1910 | 33,781 | | 17.2% |
| 1920 | 40,196 | | 19.0% |
| 1930 | 46,176 | | 14.9% |
| 1940 | 48,148 | | 4.3% |
| 1950 | 52,924 | | 9.9% |
| 1960 | 60,454 | | 14.2% |
| 1970 | 77,306 | | 27.9% |
| 1980 | 90,231 | | 16.7% |
| 1990 | 100,043 | | 10.9% |
| 2000 | 111,064 | | 11.0% |
| 2010 | 119,490 | | 7.6% |
| 2020 | 123,421 | | 3.3% |
| 2025 (est.) | 126,483 | ▲ | 2.5% |
U.S. Decennial Census; 1790–1960 1900–1990; 1990–2000 2010–2020

=== 2020 census ===
As of the 2020 census, the county had a population of 123,421. The median age was 40.9 years. 22.6% of residents were under the age of 18 and 18.1% of residents were 65 years of age or older. For every 100 females there were 96.5 males, and for every 100 females age 18 and over there were 94.0 males age 18 and over.

The racial makeup of the county was 72.8% White, 12.5% Black or African American, 0.8% American Indian and Alaska Native, 0.7% Asian, 0.1% Native Hawaiian and Pacific Islander, 6.5% from some other race, and 6.7% from two or more races. Hispanic or Latino residents of any race comprised 10.0% of the population.

61.6% of residents lived in urban areas, while 38.4% lived in rural areas.

There were 49,241 households in the county, of which 30.0% had children under the age of 18 living with them and 28.2% had a female householder with no spouse or partner present. About 28.4% of all households were made up of individuals and 12.4% had someone living alone who was 65 years of age or older.

There were 53,265 housing units, of which 7.6% were vacant. Among occupied housing units, 70.1% were owner-occupied and 29.9% were renter-occupied. The homeowner vacancy rate was 1.5% and the rental vacancy rate was 7.4%.

=== Racial and ethnic composition ===
Morgan County, Alabama – Racial and ethnic composition Note: the US Census treats Hispanic/Latino as an ethnic category. This table excludes Latinos from the racial categories and assigns them to a separate category. Hispanics/Latinos may be of any race.
| Race / Ethnicity (NH = Non-Hispanic) | Pop 2000 | Pop 2010 | Pop 2020 | % 2000 | % 2010 | % 2020 |
|---|---|---|---|---|---|---|
| White alone (NH) | 92,584 | 92,585 | 88,238 | 83.36% | 77.48% | 71.49% |
| Black or African American alone (NH) | 12,383 | 14,059 | 15,307 | 11.15% | 11.77% | 12.40% |
| Native American or Alaska Native alone (NH) | 727 | 928 | 631 | 0.65% | 0.78% | 0.51% |
| Asian alone (NH) | 491 | 665 | 829 | 0.44% | 0.56% | 0.67% |
| Pacific Islander alone (NH) | 25 | 69 | 79 | 0.02% | 0.06% | 0.06% |
| Other race alone (NH) | 62 | 80 | 376 | 0.06% | 0.07% | 0.30% |
| Mixed Race or Multiracial (NH) | 1,147 | 1,948 | 5,584 | 1.03% | 1.63% | 4.52% |
| Hispanic or Latino (any race) | 3,645 | 9,156 | 12,377 | 3.28% | 7.66% | 10.03% |
| Total | 111,064 | 119,490 | 123,421 | 100.00% | 100.00% | 100.00% |

=== 2010 census ===
As of the census of 2010, there were 119,490 people, 47,030 households, and 33,135 families living in the county. The population density was 206.4 inhabitants per square mile (79.7 inhabitants/km^{2}). There were 51,193 housing units at an average density of 88 units per square mile (34 units/km^{2}). The racial makeup of the county was 79.8% White, 11.9% Black or African American, 0.9% Native American, 0.6% Asian, 0.1% Pacific Islander, 4.8% from other races, and 2.0% from two or more races. 7.7% of the population were Hispanic or Latino of any race. Of the 47,030 households 30.0% had children under the age of 18 living with them, 52.9% were married couples living together, 12.9% had a female householder with no husband present, and 29.5% were non-families. 25.9% of households were one person and 9.8% were one person aged 65 or older. The average household size was 2.50 and the average family size was 2.99.

The age distribution was 24.0% under the age of 18, 8.4% from 18 to 24, 26.1% from 25 to 44, 27.5% from 45 to 64, and 14.1% 65 or older. The median age was 39 years. For every 100 females, there were 97.2 males. For every 100 females age 18 and over, there were 100.4 males.

The median household income was $44,349 and the median family income was $54,653. Males had a median income of $43,455 versus $29,270 for females. The per capita income for the county was $23,090. About 10.9% of families and 15.0% of the population were below the poverty line, including 21.9% of those under age 18 and 12.0% of those age 65 or over.

=== 2000 census ===
As of the census of 2000, there were 111,064 people, 43,602 households, and 31,437 families living in the county. The population density was 191 inhabitants per square mile (74 inhabitants/km^{2}). There were 47,388 housing units at an average density of 81 units per square mile (31 units/km^{2}). The racial makeup of the county was 85.07% White, 11.24% Black or African American, 0.67% Native American, 0.45% Asian, 0.07% Pacific Islander, 1.25% from other races, and 1.25% from two or more races. 3.28% of the population were Hispanic or Latino of any race. According to the census of 2000, the largest ancestry groups in Morgan County were English 60.1%, Scots-Irish 12.71%, and African 11.24%

Of the 43,602 households 33.50% had children under the age of 18 living with them, 57.40% were married couples living together, 11.20% had a female householder with no husband present, and 27.90% were non-families. 24.80% of households were one person and 9.40% were one person aged 65 or older. The average household size was 2.51 and the average family size was 2.99.

The age distribution was 25.30% under the age of 18, 8.40% from 18 to 24, 30.10% from 25 to 44, 23.80% from 45 to 64, and 12.30% 65 or older. The median age was 37 years. For every 100 females, there were 96.20 males. For every 100 females age 18 and over, there were 93.50 males.

The median household income was $37,803 and the median family income was $45,827. Males had a median income of $35,759 versus $21,885 for females. The per capita income for the county was $19,223. About 9.70% of families and 12.30% of the population were below the poverty line, including 15.90% of those under age 18 and 12.80% of those age 65 or over.

== Politics ==
Morgan County is a heavily Republican county. The last Democrat to win the county was Jimmy Carter in 1980.

United States presidential election results for Morgan County, Alabama
| Year | Republican | | Democratic | | Third party(ies) | |
| Year | No. | % | No. | % | No. | % |
|---|---|---|---|---|---|---|
| 1832 | 0 | 0.00% | 531 | 100.00% | 0 | 0.00% |
| 1836 | 476 | 45.59% | 568 | 54.41% | 0 | 0.00% |
| 1840 | 358 | 30.81% | 804 | 69.19% | 0 | 0.00% |
| 1844 | 271 | 28.44% | 682 | 71.56% | 0 | 0.00% |
| 1848 | 361 | 51.87% | 335 | 48.13% | 0 | 0.00% |
| 1852 | 208 | 30.14% | 482 | 69.86% | 0 | 0.00% |
| 1856 | 0 | 0.00% | 808 | 78.45% | 222 | 21.55% |
| 1860 | 0 | 0.00% | 545 | 44.02% | 693 | 55.98% |
| 1868 | 518 | 43.49% | 673 | 56.51% | 0 | 0.00% |
| 1872 | 1,018 | 50.30% | 1,006 | 49.70% | 0 | 0.00% |
| 1876 | 773 | 35.06% | 1,432 | 64.94% | 0 | 0.00% |
| 1880 | 644 | 27.53% | 1,420 | 60.71% | 275 | 11.76% |
| 1884 | 853 | 32.78% | 1,573 | 60.45% | 176 | 6.76% |
| 1888 | 507 | 22.77% | 1,707 | 76.65% | 13 | 0.58% |
| 1892 | 3 | 0.07% | 2,160 | 50.07% | 2,151 | 49.86% |
| 1896 | 1,462 | 38.10% | 2,128 | 55.46% | 247 | 6.44% |
| 1900 | 1,500 | 45.03% | 1,747 | 52.45% | 84 | 2.52% |
| 1904 | 416 | 20.83% | 1,437 | 71.96% | 144 | 7.21% |
| 1908 | 497 | 22.48% | 1,548 | 70.01% | 166 | 7.51% |
| 1912 | 241 | 10.16% | 1,686 | 71.11% | 444 | 18.73% |
| 1916 | 364 | 14.19% | 2,120 | 82.62% | 82 | 3.20% |
| 1920 | 1,201 | 22.54% | 4,057 | 76.13% | 71 | 1.33% |
| 1924 | 519 | 16.53% | 2,247 | 71.58% | 373 | 11.88% |
| 1928 | 4,085 | 54.76% | 3,366 | 45.12% | 9 | 0.12% |
| 1932 | 656 | 11.43% | 4,986 | 86.88% | 97 | 1.69% |
| 1936 | 432 | 7.13% | 5,597 | 92.39% | 29 | 0.48% |
| 1940 | 500 | 8.51% | 5,345 | 90.93% | 33 | 0.56% |
| 1944 | 664 | 13.72% | 4,124 | 85.24% | 50 | 1.03% |
| 1948 | 512 | 11.68% | 0 | 0.00% | 3,870 | 88.32% |
| 1952 | 2,335 | 24.89% | 7,029 | 74.94% | 16 | 0.17% |
| 1956 | 2,974 | 27.35% | 7,671 | 70.56% | 227 | 2.09% |
| 1960 | 4,357 | 35.71% | 7,822 | 64.11% | 21 | 0.17% |
| 1964 | 7,013 | 56.64% | 0 | 0.00% | 5,368 | 43.36% |
| 1968 | 3,043 | 13.66% | 1,878 | 8.43% | 17,356 | 77.91% |
| 1972 | 18,100 | 76.85% | 5,004 | 21.25% | 449 | 1.91% |
| 1976 | 9,058 | 34.86% | 16,547 | 63.68% | 381 | 1.47% |
| 1980 | 13,214 | 45.14% | 14,703 | 50.23% | 1,354 | 4.63% |
| 1984 | 24,301 | 67.99% | 11,324 | 31.68% | 116 | 0.32% |
| 1988 | 18,679 | 63.54% | 10,594 | 36.04% | 124 | 0.42% |
| 1992 | 21,073 | 47.92% | 15,091 | 34.31% | 7,814 | 17.77% |
| 1996 | 21,765 | 54.39% | 14,616 | 36.53% | 3,632 | 9.08% |
| 2000 | 25,774 | 60.39% | 16,060 | 37.63% | 847 | 1.98% |
| 2004 | 32,477 | 69.09% | 14,131 | 30.06% | 399 | 0.85% |
| 2008 | 36,014 | 71.26% | 13,895 | 27.49% | 633 | 1.25% |
| 2012 | 35,391 | 71.56% | 13,439 | 27.17% | 629 | 1.27% |
| 2016 | 37,486 | 74.02% | 11,254 | 22.22% | 1,904 | 3.76% |
| 2020 | 39,664 | 73.83% | 13,234 | 24.63% | 824 | 1.53% |
| 2024 | 40,449 | 75.54% | 12,392 | 23.14% | 702 | 1.31% |

United States Senate election results for Morgan County, Alabama2
| Year | Republican | | Democratic | | Third party(ies) | |
| Year | No. | % | No. | % | No. | % |
|---|---|---|---|---|---|---|
| 2020 | 38,280 | 71.55% | 15,108 | 28.24% | 111 | 0.21% |

United States Senate election results for Morgan County, Alabama3
| Year | Republican | | Democratic | | Third party(ies) | |
| Year | No. | % | No. | % | No. | % |
|---|---|---|---|---|---|---|
| 2022 | 25,310 | 78.84% | 5,879 | 18.31% | 916 | 2.85% |

Alabama Gubernatorial election results for Morgan County
| Year | Republican | | Democratic | | Third party(ies) | |
| Year | No. | % | No. | % | No. | % |
|---|---|---|---|---|---|---|
| 2022 | 25,484 | 79.30% | 5,362 | 16.69% | 1,289 | 4.01% |

== Transportation ==
=== Major highways ===
- Interstate 65
- U.S. Route 31 / State Route 3 (unsigned)
- U.S. Highway 72 Alternate / State Route 20
- U.S. Highway 231 / State Route 53 (unsigned)
- State Route 24
- State Route 36
- State Route 67
- State Route 157

=== Rail ===
- CSX Transportation
- Norfolk Southern Railway

== Communities ==
=== Cities ===
- Decatur (county seat; part of Decatur is in Limestone County)
- Hartselle
- Huntsville, (has land within Morgan County, but most of its population is in Madison County)

=== Towns ===
- Eva
- Falkville
- Priceville
- Somerville
- Trinity

=== Unincorporated communities ===
- Basham
- Brooksville
- Burningtree Mountain
- Danville
- Hulaco
- Lacey's Spring
- Massey
- Morgan City (partly in Marshall County)
- Moulton Heights
- Neel
- Pence
- Penn
- Ryan Crossroads
- Six Mile
- Six Way
- Union Hill
- Valhermoso Springs
- Woodland Mills

=== Former city ===
- Albany/New Decatur

=== Former town ===
- Austinville
- Cedar Lake
- Flint City

=== Ghost town ===
- Lacon

== Education ==
School districts include:

- Decatur City School District
- Hartselle City School District
- Morgan County Schools

== See also ==
- National Register of Historic Places listings in Morgan County, Alabama
- Properties on the Alabama Register of Landmarks and Heritage in Morgan County, Alabama
- Water contamination in Lawrence and Morgan Counties, Alabama
