= Hartselle, Alabama =

City in Alabama, United States

- City
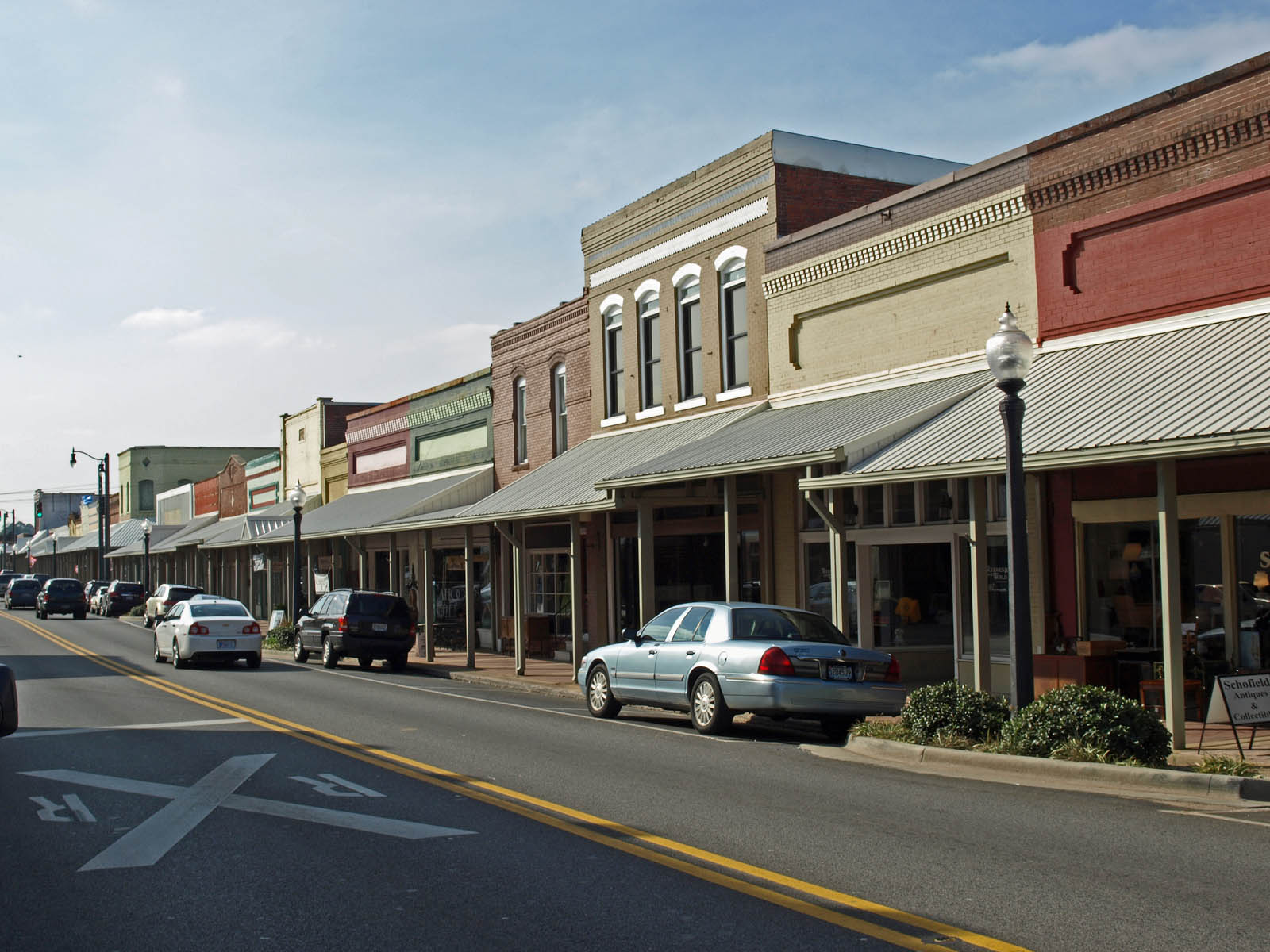
- The Hartselle Downtown Commercial Historic District was added to the National Register of Historic Places on April 22, 1999.

- Flag Seal
- Nickname: The City of Southern Hospitality
- Location in Morgan County, Alabama
- Coordinates: 34°26′25″N 86°56′25″W
- Country: United States
- State: Alabama
- County: Morgan
- Established: 1869

Government
  - Mayor: Missy Evans

Area
  - Total: 16.73 sq mi (43.33 km^{2})
  - Land: 16.64 sq mi (43.10 km^{2})
  - Water: 0.089 sq mi (0.23 km^{2}) 0.07%
- Elevation: 673 ft (205 m)

Population (2020)
  - Total: 15,455
  - Density: 928.8/sq mi (358.62/km^{2})
- Time zone: UTC-6 (CST)
  - Summer (DST): UTC-5 (CDT)
- ZIP code: 35640
- Area code: 256
- FIPS code: 01-33448
- GNIS feature ID: 2403812
- Website: www.hartselle.org

Hartselle is the second largest city in Morgan County, Alabama, United States, 13 miles (21 km) south of Decatur. It is part of the Decatur Metropolitan Area and the Huntsville-Decatur Combined Statistical Area.

As of the 2020 census, the population of the city was 15,455. Hartselle was founded in 1869 with the arrival of the South and North Alabama Railroad. It takes its name from George Hartsell, one of the railroad's owners. The post office opened in 1873. It was formally incorporated on March 1, 1875. Most of the oldest buildings were destroyed by a disastrous fire in 1916.

== Geography ==
Hartselle is located in western Morgan County at 34°26′25″N 86°56′25″W (34.440383, -86.940385). It is in the north-central part of the state along Interstate 65, which runs from south to north through the easternmost parts of the city, with access from exits 325 and 328. Via I-65, Huntsville is 34 miles (55 km) northeast (via a connection to I-565), and Birmingham is 70 miles (110 km) south. U.S. Route 31 is the main north–south highway through the center of town, leading north 13 miles (21 km) to Decatur, the Morgan county seat, and south 20 miles (32 km) to Cullman. Alabama State Route 36, Main Street, is the main east–west route through downtown, leading east 23 miles (37 km) to Lacey's Spring and west the same distance to Moulton.

According to the U.S. Census Bureau, the city of Hartselle has a total area of 16.7 square miles (43 km^{2}), of which 0.1 square miles (0.26 km^{2}), or 0.53%, are water.

== Demographics ==
Historical population
Census	Pop.	Note	%±
1880	226		—
1890	596		163.7%
1900	670		12.4%
1910	1,374		105.1%
1920	2,009		46.2%
1930	2,204		9.7%
1940	2,584		17.2%
1950	3,429		32.7%
1960	5,000		45.8%
1970	7,355		47.1%
1980	8,858		20.4%
1990	10,795		21.9%
2000	12,019		11.3%
2010	14,255		18.6%
2020	15,455		8.4%
U.S. Decennial Census

=== Racial and ethnic composition ===
Hartselle city, Alabama – Racial and ethnic composition Note: the US Census treats Hispanic/Latino as an ethnic category. This table excludes Latinos from the racial categories and assigns them to a separate category. Hispanics/Latinos may be of any race. Race and ethnicity were not reported in Alabama for populations under 2,500 in 1980 and under 1,000 in 1990.
Race / Ethnicity (NH = Non-Hispanic)	Pop 1980	Pop 1990	Pop 2000	Pop 2010	Pop 2020	% 1980	% 1990	% 2000	% 2010	% 2020
White alone (NH)	8,174	9,997	11,020	12,915	13,380	92.28%	92.61%	91.69%	90.60%	86.57%
Black or African American alone (NH)	615	680	614	600	709	6.94%	6.30%	5.11%	4.21%	4.59%
Native American or Alaska Native alone (NH)	0	53	76	103	63	0.00%	0.49%	0.63%	0.72%	0.41%
Asian alone (NH)	38	28	37	61	89	0.43%	0.26%	0.31%	0.43%	0.58%
Native Hawaiian or Pacific Islander alone (NH)	x	x	2	3	8	x	x	0.02%	0.02%	0.05%
Other race alone (NH)	0	1	3	5	42	0.00%	0.01%	0.02%	0.04%	0.27%
Mixed race or Multiracial (NH)	x	x	112	211	715	x	x	0.93%	1.48%	4.63%
Hispanic or Latino (any race)	31	36	155	357	449	0.35%	0.33%	1.29%	2.50%	2.91%
Total	8,858	10,795	12,019	14,255	15,455	100.00%	100.00%	100.00%	100.00%	100.00%

=== 2020 census ===
As of the 2020 census, there were 15,455 people, 6,146 households, and 3,930 families residing in the city. The median age was 39.9 years; 24.6% were under the age of 18 and 17.6% were 65 years of age or older. For every 100 females there were 90.8 males, and for every 100 females age 18 and over there were 85.9 males.

91.8% of residents lived in urban areas, while 8.2% lived in rural areas.

Of the city's 6,146 households, 33.8% had children under the age of 18 living with them. Of all households, 52.6% were married-couple households, 14.4% were households with a male householder and no spouse or partner present, and 28.5% were households with a female householder and no spouse or partner present. About 26.1% of all households were made up of individuals and 12.1% had someone living alone who was 65 years of age or older.

There were 6,573 housing units, of which 6.5% were vacant. The homeowner vacancy rate was 1.9% and the rental vacancy rate was 8.4%.

=== 2010 census ===
At the 2010 census there were 14,255 people, 5,678 households, and 4,128 families living in the city. The population density was 956.7 inhabitants per square mile (369.4/km^{2}). There were 6,076 housing units at an average density of 407.8 per square mile (157.5/km^{2}). The racial makeup of the city was 91.5% White, 4.3% Black or African American, 0.8% Native American, 0.4% Asian, 0.0% Pacific Islander, 1.3% from other races, and 1.7% from two or more races. 2.5% of the population were Hispanic or Latino of any race.

Of the 5,678 households 33.7% had children under the age of 18 living with them, 57.2% were married couples living together, 11.2% had a female householder with no husband present, and 27.3% were non-families. 24.4% of households were one person and 10.7% were one person aged 65 or older. The average household size was 2.51 and the average family size was 2.97.

The age distribution was 25.4% under the age of 18, 7.5% from 18 to 24, 26.2% from 25 to 44, 26.8% from 45 to 64, and 14.2% 65 or older. The median age was 38.7 years. For every 100 females, there were 93.2 males. For every 100 females age 18 and over, there were 93.7 males.

The median household income was $47,306 and the median family income was $57,585. Males had a median income of $47,343 versus $28,855 for females. The per capita income for the city was $21,746. About 9.4% of families and 11.7% of the population were below the poverty line, including 12.8% of those under age 18 and 14.9% of those age 65 or over.

=== 2000 census ===
At the 2000 census there were 12,019 people, 4,816 households, and 3,534 families living in the city. The population density was 809.0 inhabitants per square mile (312.4/km^{2}). There were 5,170 housing units at an average density of 348.0 per square mile (134.4/km^{2}). The racial makeup of the city was 92.25% White, 5.16% Black or African American, 0.63% Native American, 0.31% Asian, 0.02% Pacific Islander, 0.33% from other races, and 1.31% from two or more races. 1.29% of the population were Hispanic or Latino of any race.

Of the 4,814 households 35.5% had children under the age of 18 living with them, 59.1% were married couples living together, 10.9% had a female householder with no husband present, and 26.6% were non-families. 24.4% of households were one person and 11.2% were one person aged 65 or older. The average household size was 2.49 and the average family size was 2.97.

The age distribution was 25.5% under the age of 18, 7.7% from 18 to 24, 29.3% from 25 to 44, 23.5% from 45 to 64, and 14.0% 65 or older. The median age was 37 years. For every 100 females, there were 92.3 males. For every 100 females age 18 and over, there were 88.8 males.

The median household income was $40,461 and the median family income was $47,685. Males had a median income of $40,211 versus $24,124 for females. The per capita income for the city was $20,727. About 6.6% of families and 8.6% of the population were below the poverty line, including 8.8% of those under age 18 and 11.9% of those age 65 or over.

== Notable people ==
- Jill Alper, electoral strategist
- Wilford S. Bailey, former NCAA president and former Auburn University president
- Scott Beason, member of Alabama Senate from 2006 to 2014
- Quanesha Burks, track and field star
- Jay Burleson, filmmaker
- Chloe Holladay, majorette and internet personality
- William Bradford Huie, journalist, editor, publisher and author
- Don Logan, former chairman of Time Warner Media and Communications Group
- Mortal Treason, Christian metal band
- Harold Raley, American hispanist
- Tommy Ed Roberts, businessman and legislator
- Destin Sandlin, YouTuber and USAF engineer
- John Sparkman, congressman and senator
- Steve Woodard, former MLB pitcher
- Robert H. York, U.S. Army lieutenant general
