= Danville, Alabama =

- Unincorporated community
- Location in Alabama.
- Coordinates: 34°24′52″N 87°05′15″W
- Country: United States
- State: Alabama
- County: Morgan
- Elevation: 610 ft (186 m)
- Time zone: UTC-6 (Central (CST))
  - Summer (DST): UTC-5 (CDT)
- ZIP code: 35619
- Area code: 256
- GNIS feature ID: 159483

Danville is an unincorporated community in Morgan County, Alabama, United States.

== Demographics ==
Historical population
Census	Pop.	Note	%±
1880	117		—
U.S. Decennial Census

Danville appeared on the 1880 U.S. Census with a population of 117. This was the only time it appeared on census rolls. It is included in the Decatur metropolitan area and the larger Huntsville-Decatur combined statistical area.

== Notable people ==
- Jesse Owens, a track and field athlete, won a silver medal in the 1936 Summer Olympics. Albritton was the first African American to hold the world high jump record, at 6'9 3/4".
- Nathaniel Barrett, physician and politician
