= 2022 United States Senate election in Alabama =

- November 8, 2022
- Turnout: 38.50% ▼
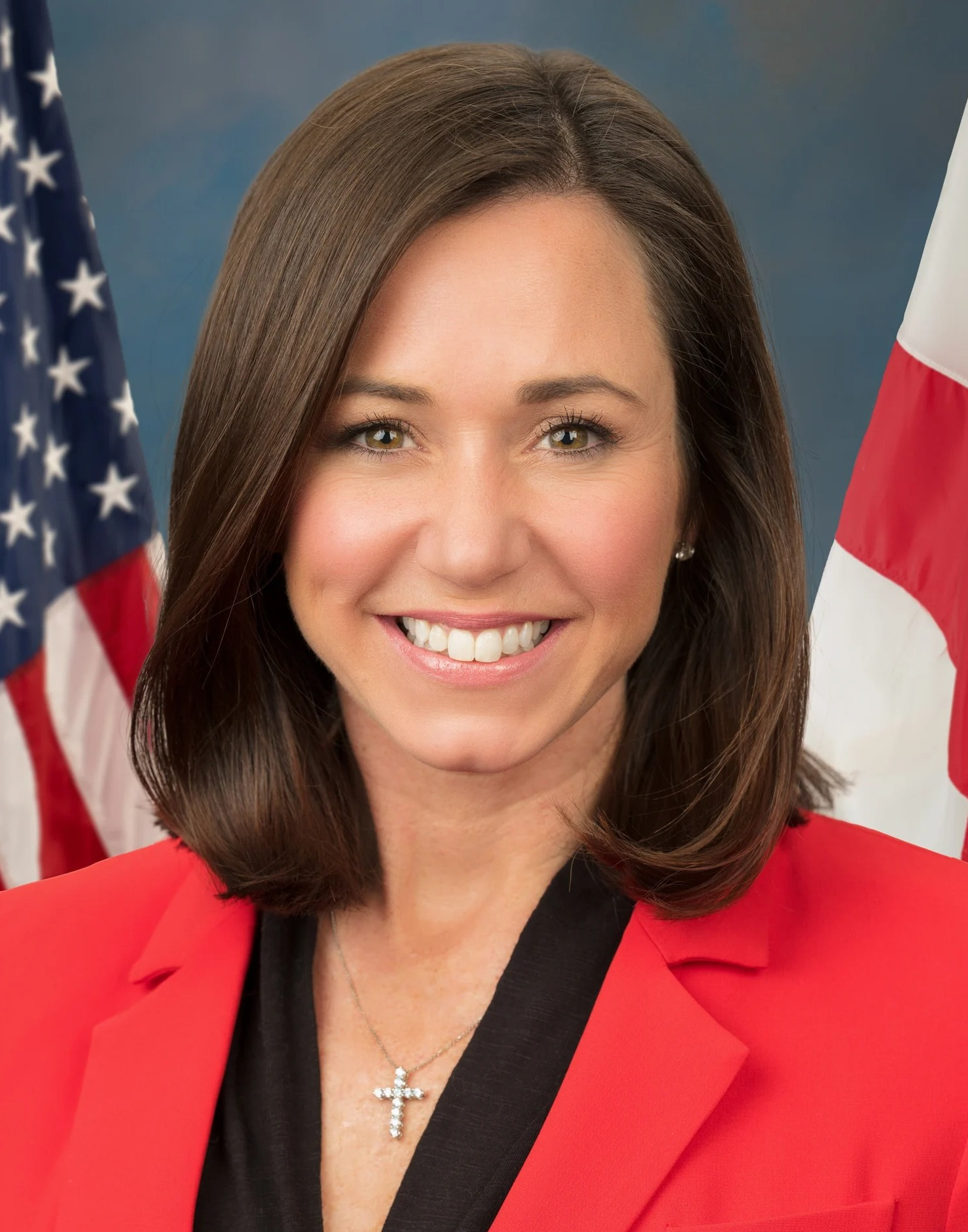

Nominee	Katie Britt	Will Boyd
Party	Republican	Democratic
Popular vote	942,154	436,746
Percentage	66.62%	30.88%
- Britt: 40–50% 50–60% 60–70% 70–80% 80–90% >90% Boyd: 40–50% 50–60% 60–70% 70–80% 80–90% >90%
U.S. senator before election
Richard Shelby
Republican
Elected U.S. senator
Katie Britt
Republican

The 2022 United States Senate election in Alabama was held on November 8, 2022, to elect a member of the United States Senate to represent the State of Alabama. Incumbent Senator Richard Shelby was first elected in 1986 and re-elected in 1992 as a Democrat before becoming a Republican in 1994. In February 2021, Shelby announced that he would not seek re-election to a seventh term, which resulted in the first open Senate seat since 1996 and the first in this seat since 1968. (Note: Maryon Pittman Allen ran for this Class III seat in the special election in 1978 following the death of her husband James Allen, but lost in the Democratic primary to Donald Stewart, who won the election. Stewart ran for re-election to a full term in 1980, but lost in the Democratic primary to Jim Folsom.)

Primary elections in Alabama were held on May 24, with Will Boyd securing the Democratic nomination. However, as none of the Republican candidates received at least 50% of the vote, a runoff election occurred on June 21 between the top two candidates of the first round: attorney Katie Britt and U.S. representative Mo Brooks. Britt won the runoff against Brooks and subsequently became the Republican nominee.

Britt's victory in the Republican Party primary was seen as tantamount to election in Alabama, which is a heavily Republican state. Britt won the general election and became the first woman elected to the U.S. Senate in the state's history. (Note: Alabama had never elected a female senator in the state's history. Two previous female senators, Dixie Graves and Maryon Pittman Allen, were appointed to the Senate, but were never nominated in a Senate election.)

== Republican primary ==
Early polling showed U.S. Representative Mo Brooks as the frontrunner in the race, and he received the endorsement of former president Donald Trump. However, in November, the race started becoming increasingly closer with former chief of staff to incumbent senator Richard Shelby, Katie Britt, running neck and neck with Brooks. In March 2022, businessman and former pilot Michael Durant took the lead in the race, with Brooks only just beginning to spend money on television advertisements. On March 23, 2022, with Brooks polling in third place, Trump revoked his endorsement and promised to endorse a new candidate. In his official statement, Trump slammed Brooks for wanting to move past the 2020 United States presidential election, and claimed he went "woke" on it. There was speculation that Trump withdrew his endorsement because he did not want to be associated with a losing campaign. Brooks claimed that Trump had told him to reinstate him as president and that Trump had been manipulated by Senate Minority Leader Mitch McConnell. Brooks attacked Britt as allegedly being weak on illegal immigration and supporting higher taxes, while Brooks' critics frequently point to his long career in politics, having been in office for 40 years. In May, a planned debate between the three candidates was canceled after Durant declined to attend. A runoff election took place on June 21 as none of the candidates managed 50% of the vote needed to win the nomination outright, with Britt becoming the Republican nominee.

=== Candidates ===
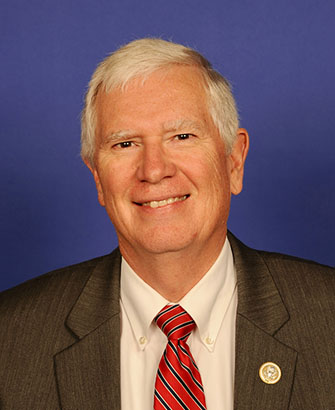
U.S. Representative Mo Brooks lost the runoff.

==== Nominee ====
- Katie Britt, former president and CEO of the Business Council of Alabama; former chief of staff to outgoing senator Richard Shelby

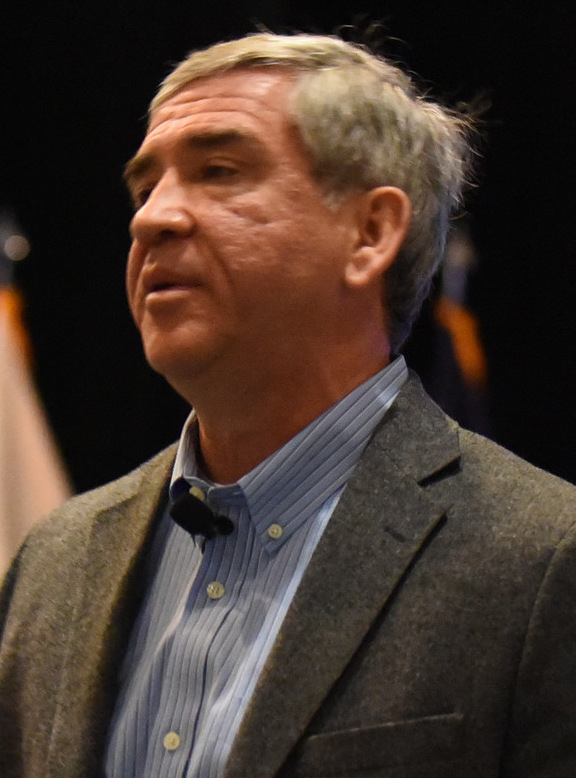
Businessman Michael Durant finished third in the initial primary.

==== Eliminated in runoff ====
- Mo Brooks, U.S. representative for Alabama's 5th congressional district (2011–2023) and candidate for U.S. Senate in 2017

==== Eliminated in initial primary ====
- Lillie Boddie
- Karla DuPriest, businesswoman
- Michael Durant, businessman, former U.S. Army pilot, and author
- Jake Schafer, author and psychologist

==== Withdrawn ====
- Lynda Blanchard, U.S. ambassador to Slovenia (2019–2021) (ran for governor)
- Mike Dunn, U.S. Marine Corps veteran (ran for Alabama Senate; endorsed Durant)
- Jessica Taylor, businesswoman and candidate for Alabama's 2nd congressional district in 2020 (endorsed Durant, later Brooks)

==== Declined ====
- Robert Aderholt, U.S. representative for Alabama's 4th congressional district (1997–present) (ran for re-election)
- Will Ainsworth, lieutenant governor of Alabama (2019–present) (ran for re-election)
- John Merrill, Alabama secretary of state (2015–2023) and candidate for U.S. Senate in 2020
- Barry Moore, U.S. representative for Alabama's 2nd congressional district (2021–present) (ran for re-election; endorsed Brooks)
- Jeff Sessions, former U.S. attorney general (2017–2018) and former U.S. senator (1997–2017)
- Richard Shelby, incumbent U.S. senator (1987–2023) (endorsed Britt)

=== Endorsements ===
Katie Britt

U.S. presidents

- Donald Trump, 45th president of the United States (2017–2021) (switched endorsement from Brooks)

Executive branch officials

- Sarah Huckabee Sanders, former White House press secretary (2017–2019) and candidate for governor of Arkansas in 2022

U.S. senators

- Shelley Moore Capito, U.S. senator from West Virginia (2015–present)
- Susan Collins, U.S. senator from Maine (1997–present)
- Tom Cotton, U.S. senator from Arkansas (2015–present)
- Joni Ernst, U.S. senator from Iowa (2015–present)
- Deb Fischer, U.S. senator from Nebraska (2013–present)
- Lindsey Graham, U.S. senator from South Carolina (2003–present)
- Jim Inhofe, U.S. senator from Oklahoma (1994–2023)
- Tim Scott, U.S. senator from South Carolina (2013–present)
- Richard Shelby, U.S. senator from Alabama (1987–2023)
- John Thune, U.S. senator from South Dakota (2005–present)
- Thom Tillis, U.S. senator from North Carolina (2015–present)

U.S. representatives

- Parker Griffith, former U.S. representative from Alabama's 5th congressional district (2009–2011) (Democratic)

State senators

- Greg Albritton, Alabama state senator for District 22 (Atmore, 2014–present)
- Donnie Chesteen, Alabama state senator for District 29 (Geneva, 2018–present)
- Chris Elliott, Alabama state senator for District 32 (Fairhope, 2018–present)
- Garlan Gudger, Alabama state senator for District 4 (Cullman, 2018–present)
- Andrew Jones, Alabama state senator for District 10 (Centre, 2018–present)
- Randy Price, Alabama state senator for District 13 (Opelika, 2018–present)
- Clay Scofield, former majority leader of the Alabama Senate, Alabama state senator for District 9 (Guntersville, 2010–2023)
- David Sessions, Alabama state senator for District 35 (Grand Bay, 2018–present)
- J. T. Waggoner, Alabama state senator for District 16 (Vestavia Hills, 1990–present)
- Tom Whatley, Alabama state senator for District 27 (Auburn, 2010–2022)
- Jack W. Williams, Alabama state senator for District 34 (Wilmer, 2018–present)

State representatives

- Cynthia Almond, Alabama state representative for District 63 (Tuscaloosa, 2021–2025)
- Alan Baker, Alabama state representative for District 66 (Brewton, 2006–present)
- Russell Bedsole, Alabama state representative for District 49 (Alabaster, 2020–present)
- Chris Blackshear, Alabama state representative for District 80 (Smiths Station, 2016–present)
- Chip Brown, Alabama state representative for District 105 (Dauphin Island, 2018–present)
- Steve Clouse, Alabama state representative for District 93 (Ozark, 1994–present)
- Terri Collins, Alabama state representative for District 8 (Decatur, 2010–present)
- Danny Crawford, Alabama state representative for District 5 (Athens, 2016–present)
- Brett Easterbrook, Alabama state representative for District 65 (Fruitdale, 2016–present)
- Corley Ellis, Alabama state representative for District 41 (Columbiana, 2016–present)
- Tracy Estes, Alabama state representative for District 17 (Winfield, 2018–present)
- Allen Farley, Alabama state representative for District 15 (Pleasant Grove, 2010–2022)
- David Faulkner, Alabama state representative for District 46 (Homewood, 2014–present)
- Joe Faust, Alabama state representative for District 94 (Fairhope, 2004–2022)
- Danny Garrett, majority whip of the Alabama House of Representatives, Alabama state representative for District 44 (Trussville, 2014–present)
- Victor Gaston, president pro tempore of the Alabama House of Representatives, Alabama state representative for District 100 (Mobile, 1982–2022)
- Steve Hurst, Alabama state representative for District 35 (Munford, 1998–present)
- Reed Ingram, Alabama state representative for District 75 (Mathews, 2014–present)
- Gil Isbell, Alabama state representative for District 28 (Gadsden, 2018–present)
- Jamie Kiel, Alabama state representative for District 18 (Russellville, 2018–present)
- Wes Kitchens, Alabama state representative for District 27 (Arab, 2018–2024)
- Nathaniel Ledbetter, former majority leader of the Alabama House of Representatives, Alabama state representative for District 24 (Rainsville, 2014–present)
- Paul Lee, Alabama state representative for District 86 (Dothan, 2010–present)
- Craig Lipscomb, Alabama state representative for District 29 (Gadsden, 2012–present)
- Joe Lovvorn, Alabama state representative for District 79 (Auburn, 2016–present)
- Rhett Marques, Alabama state representative for District 91 (Enterprise, 2018–present)
- Mac McCutcheon, former speaker of the Alabama House of Representatives, Alabama state representative for District 25 (Monrovia, 2006–2022)
- Ed Oliver, Alabama state representative for District 81 (Alexander City, 2018–present)
- Rex Reynolds, Alabama state representative for District 21 (Huntsville, 2018–present)
- Ben Robbins, Alabama state representative for District 33 (Sylacauga, 2021–present)
- Proncey Robertson, Alabama state representative for District 7 (Mount Hope, 2018–2022)
- Howard Sanderford, Alabama state representative for District 20 (Huntsville, 1989–2022)
- Chris Sells, Alabama state representative for District 90 (Greenville, 2014–present)
- Ginny Shaver, Alabama state representative for District 39 (Leesburg, 2018–present)
- Randall Shedd, Alabama state representative for District 11 (Cullman, 2013–2025)
- Harry Shiver, Alabama state representative for District 64 (Bay Minette, 2006–2022)
- Matt Simpson, Alabama state representative for District 96 (Daphne, 2018–present)
- Ivan Smith, Alabama state representative for District 42 (Billingsley, 2019–present)
- Jeff Sorrells, Alabama state representative for District 87 (Hartford, 2018–present)
- Kyle South, Alabama state representative for District 16 (Fayette, 2014–2023)
- David Standridge, Alabama state representative for District 34 (Hayden, 2012–present)
- Rodney Sullivan, Alabama state representative for District 61 (Northport, 2018–2022)
- Andy Whitt, Alabama state representative for District 6 (Harvest, 2018–present)
- Margie Wilcox, Alabama state representative for District 104 (Mobile, 2014–present)
- Debbie Wood, Alabama state representative for District 38 (Valley, 2018–2025)

Mayors

- Sandy Stimpson, mayor of Mobile (2013–2025)

Individuals

- Steve Cortes, conservative news personality and former Donald Trump campaign advisor
- Roy Drinkard, businessman and Marine Corps veteran
- Steve Flowers, columnist, political commentator and former state representative (1982–1998)
- Siran Stacy, former University of Alabama Crimson Tide running back

Organizations

- Alabama Associated General Contractors
- Alabama Farmers Federation
- Alabama Forestry Association
- Alabama Mining Association
- Alabama Restaurant and Hospitality Association
- Alabama Retail Association
- Alabama Rural Electric Association of Cooperatives
- Associated Builders and Contractors of Alabama
- Automobile Dealers Association of Alabama
- Home Builders Association of Alabama
- League of Southeastern Credit Unions
- Maggie's List
- Manufacture Alabama
- National Association of Realtors
- National Wildlife Federation Action Fund

PACs

- Alabama Conservatives Fund
- Alabama RetailPAC
- Business-Industry PAC
- VIEW PAC
- Winning For Women PAC
Mo Brooks (eliminated)

U.S. presidents

- ~~Donald Trump, 45th president of the United States (2017–2021)~~ (switched endorsement to Britt)

Executive branch officials

- ~~Michael Flynn, 25th U.S. national security advisor (2017) (Democratic)~~ (switched endorsement to Durant)

U.S. senators

- Ted Cruz, U.S. senator from Texas (2013–present)
- Rand Paul, U.S. senator from Kentucky (2011–present)

U.S. representatives

- Brian Babin, U.S. representative for Texas's 36th congressional district (2015–present)
- Jim Jordan, U.S. representative for Ohio's 4th congressional district (2007–present)
- Thomas Massie, U.S. representative for Kentucky's 4th congressional district (2012–present)
- Barry Moore, U.S. representative for Alabama's 2nd congressional district (2021–present)
- Scott Perry, U.S. representative for Pennsylvania's 10th congressional district (2013–present), chairman of the House Freedom Caucus (2022–present)
- Marjorie Taylor Greene. U.S. representative for Georgia's 14th congressional district (2021–present)

State legislators

- Bill Armistead, Alabama state senator for District 14 (1995–2003), Chair of the Alabama Republican Party (2011–2015)
- Tommy Hanes, Alabama state representative for District 23 (2014–present)
- Arnold Mooney, Alabama state representative for District 43 (2014–present)
- Wendy Rogers, Arizona state senator for District 6 (2021–present)
- Ritchie Whorton, Alabama state representative for District 22 (2014–present)

Party officials

- Marty Connors, chair of the Alabama Republican Party (2001–2005)
- Terry Lathan, chair of the Alabama Republican Party (2015–2021)
- Kelli Ward, chair of the Arizona Republican Party (2019–2023)

Judges

- Roy Moore, former chief justice of the Supreme Court of Alabama, Republican nominee for U.S. Senate in 2017 and former U.S. Senate candidate in 2020

Individuals

- Glenn Beck, conservative political commentator and host of the Glenn Beck Radio Program
- David Earnest, conservative talk radio host of The Health and Wealth Show
- Apryl Marie Fogel, conservative talk radio host of Straight Talk with Apryl Marie
- Dale Jackson, conservative talk radio host of The Dale Jackson Show and Yellowhammer News contributor
- Charlie Kirk, conservative activist and founder of Turning Point USA
- Sebastian Gorka, former deputy assistant to the president (2017), media personality, military and intelligence analyst
- Mark Levin, author, lawyer, host of conservative talk show The Mark Levin Show and Life, Liberty & Levin on Fox News
- Sandy Rios, American Family Association member and talk radio host
- Jessica Taylor, businesswoman, former candidate for Alabama's 2nd congressional district in 2020 and withdrawn candidate for Senate in 2022 (switched endorsement from Durant)
- Donald Trump Jr., businessman and son of former President Donald Trump
- Tim Wildmon, president of the American Family Association

Organizations

- Alabama Republican Assembly
- American Principles Project
- BamaCarry
- Christian Conservatives of Alabama
- Club for Growth
- Eagle Forum
- FreedomWorks
- Gun Owners of America
- National Association for Gun Rights
- Republicans for National Renewal
- Senate Conservatives Fund
- Turning Point Action

PACs

- Americans for Legal Immigration PAC
- Eagle Forum PAC
- NRA Political Victory Fund
Mike Durant (eliminated)

Executive branch officials

- Michael Flynn, 25th U.S. national security advisor (2017) (Democratic) (switched endorsement from Brooks)
- Ryan Zinke, 52nd United States secretary of the interior (2017–2019) and former U.S. representative for Montana's at-large congressional district (2015–2017)

Individuals

- William G. Boykin, retired lieutenant general and former Deputy Under Secretary of Defense for Intelligence (2002–2007)
- Mike Dunn, Marine Corps veteran, withdrawn candidate for Senate in 2022, candidate for State Senate district 17
- Ted Nugent, musician and activist (switched endorsement from Taylor)
- ~~Jessica Taylor, businesswoman, former candidate for Alabama's 2nd congressional district in 2020 and withdrawn candidate for Senate in 2022~~ (switched endorsement to Brooks after Durant's elimination)

PACs

- Combat Veterans for Congress PAC
- More Perfect Union
- SEAL PAC
Jessica Taylor (withdrawn)

Individuals

- ~~Ted Nugent, musician and activist~~ (switched endorsement to Durant after Taylor withdrew)

=== Debates and forums ===
2022 Alabama Republican U.S. Senate primary debates and forums
No.	Date	Host	Link	Participants					
P Participant A Absent N Non-invitee I Invitee W Withdrawn O Not yet entered race									
P Participant A Absent N Non-invitee I Invitee W Withdrawn O Not yet entered race				Blanchard	Britt	Brooks	Dunn	Durant	Taylor
1	Sep 15, 2021	Coffee County Republican Women	WTVY	P	P	P	A	O	A
2	Sep 28, 2021	Alabama Public Employees' Advocacy League	WHNT	P	P	A	P	O	P
3	Feb 19, 2022	Alabama Republican Party	N/A	W	P	P	W	P	W
4	Feb 28, 2022	Butler County Republican Party	N/A	W	P	P	W	A	W
5	Mar 22, 2022	Tallapoosa County Republican Party	N/A	W	P	P	W	A	W
6	Mar 24, 2022	Houston County Republican Party	N/A	W	P	P	W	A	W
7	Apr 25, 2022	Calhoun County Chamber of Commerce	N/A	W	A	P	W	A	W

=== First round ===
==== Polling ====
Aggregate polls

Source of poll aggregation	Dates administered	Dates updated	Katie Britt	Mo Brooks	Mike Durant	Other (Note: Calculated by taking the difference of 100% and all other candidates combined.)	Margin
Real Clear Politics	May 15–21, 2022	May 24, 2022	34.7%	28.7%	25.3%	11.3%	Britt +6.0

Poll source	Date(s) administered	Sample size (Note: Key: A – all adults RV – registered voters LV – likely voters V – unclear)	Margin of error	Lynda Blanchard	Katie Britt	Mo Brooks	Mike Durant	Jessica Taylor	Other	Undecided
The Trafalgar Group (R)	May 18–21, 2022	1,060 (LV)	± 2.9%	–	36%	28%	23%	–	4% (Note: Boddie with 2%; DuPriest and Schafer with 1%)	9%
McLaughlin & Associates (R) (Note: Poll sponsored by ForestPAC, a wing of the Alabama Forestry Association, which supports Britt)	May 16–19, 2022	500 (LV)	± 4.4%	–	37%	25%	24%	–	–	13%
Cygnal (R)	May 15–16, 2022	634 (LV)	± 3.9%	–	31%	29%	24%	–	6%	10%
Emerson College	May 15–16, 2022	706 (LV)	± 3.6%	–	32%	25%	26%	–	3% (Note: Boddie with 2%; DuPriest with 1%; Schafer with 0%)	14%
McLaughlin & Associates (R)	May 9–12, 2022	500 (LV)	± 4.4%	–	37%	21%	31%	–	–	12%
Cygnal (R)	May 6–7, 2022	600 (LV)	± 4.0%	–	32%	23%	21%	–	9%	16%
Moore Information Group (R)	May 2–5, 2022	400 (LV)	± 5.0%	–	27%	20%	20%	–	9% (Note: "None" with 4%; Schafer and DuPriest with 2%; Boddie with 1%)	24%
McLaughlin & Associates (R)	May 2–5, 2022	500 (LV)	± 4.4%	–	39%	22%	27%	–	–	12%
Emerson College	March 25–27, 2022	687 (LV)	± 3.7%	–	23%	12%	33%	–	7% (Note: DuPriest with 4%; Boddie and Schafer with 1%)	26%
Cygnal (R)	March 16–17, 2022	600 (LV)	± 4.0%	–	28%	16%	35%	–	7% (Note: Boddie with 7%; DuPriest and Schafer with 0%)	14%
Wisemen Consulting (R)	March 15–17, 2022	– (LV)	± 3.4%	–	27%	23%	29%	–	4% (Note: DuPriest with 3%, Schafer with 1%)	17%
McLaughlin & Associates (R)	March 10–13, 2022	500 (LV)	± 4.4%	–	32%	18%	34%	–	–	17%
Cherry Communications (R) (Note: Poll sponsored by FarmPAC, a wing of the Alabama Farmers Federation, which supports Britt)	February 2–6, 2022	600 (LV)	± 4.0%	–	29%	34%	24%	–	–	13%
Deep Root Analytics (R) (Note: Poll sponsored by Britt's campaign)	January 29–31, 2022	2,088 (LV)	± 2.1%	–	29%	28%	23%	–	–	20%
WPA Intelligence (R) (Note: Poll sponsored by Club for Growth Action which endorsed Brooks prior to the sampling period)	January 25–27, 2022	513 (LV)	± 4.4%	–	25%	35%	30%	–	–	10%
	January 4, 2022	Taylor withdraws from the race								
McLaughlin & Associates (R)	December 6–9, 2021	500 (LV)	± 4.5%	–	26%	31%	17%	4%	–	22%
	December 2, 2021	Blanchard withdraws from the race								
TargetPoint Consulting (R)	November 3–8, 2021	300 (LV)	± 5.7%	–	31%	30%	12%	7%	–	20%
Cygnal (R) (Note: Poll sponsored by Alabama Conservatives Fund, which supports Britt)	November 3–4, 2021	650 (LV)	± 3.8%	1%	24%	22%	9%	1%	4%	39%
The Strategy Group (R) (Note: Poll sponsored by the Alabama House Republican Caucus)	November 1–4, 2021	784 (LV)	± 3.8%	3%	23%	28%	7%	1%	–	31%
Cygnal (R)	October 21–22, 2021	– (LV)	–	–	14%	26%	–	–	–	–
WPA Intelligence (R)	October 12–14, 2021	506 (LV)	± 4.4%	5%	12%	55%	–	5%	–	23%
Public Opinion Strategies (R)	August 24 – September 2, 2021	600 (LV)	± 4.6%	3%	11%	41%	–	7%	–	39%
Cygnal (R)	August 17–18, 2021	600 (LV)	± 4.0%	2%	18%	41%	–	3%	5%	32%
WPA Intelligence (R)	April 26–27, 2021	509 (LV)	± 4.4%	13%	9%	59%	–	–	–	19%

==== Results ====
Initial primary results by county Britt: 30–40%; 40–50%; 50–60%; 60–70%; Brooks: 30–40%

Initial primary results by precinct Britt: 30–40%; 40–50%; 50–60%; 60–70%; 70–80%; 80–90%; >90%; Brooks: 30–40%; 40–50%; 50–60%; 60–70%; 70–80%; 80–90%; >90%; Durant: 30–40%; 40–50%; 50–60%; 60–70%; 70–80%; 80–90%; >90%; Boddie: >90%; Tie: 20–30%; 30–40%; 40–50%; 50%; No votes

Republican primary results
Party	Candidate	Votes	%
Republican	Katie Britt	289,425	44.75%
Republican	Mo Brooks	188,539	29.15%
Republican	Michael Durant	150,817	23.32%
Republican	Jake Schafer	7,371	1.14%
Republican	Karla DuPriest	5,739	0.89%
Republican	Lillie Boddie	4,849	0.75%
Total votes		646,740	100.0%

=== Runoff ===
==== Polling ====
Poll source	Date(s) administered	Sample size	Margin of error	Katie Britt	Mo Brooks	Undecided
McLaughlin & Associates (R)	June 13–16, 2022	500 (LV)	± 4.4%	58%	33%	9%
Auburn University at Montgomery	June 8–15, 2022	400 (LV)	± 4.9%	50%	30%	20%
Emerson College	June 12–13, 2022	1,000 (LV)	± 3.0%	50%	34%	17%
JMC Analytics (R)	June 6–9, 2022	630 (LV)	± 3.9%	51%	39%	10%
McLaughlin & Associates (R)	June 6–9, 2022	500 (LV)	± 4.4%	55%	36%	9%
Cygnal (R)	March 16–17, 2022	600 (LV)	± 4.0%	51%	28%	21%
McLaughlin & Associates (R)	December 6–9, 2021	500 (LV)	± 4.5%	39%	37%	25%
Cygnal (R)	November 3–4, 2021	650 (LV)	± 3.8%	35%	29%	36%
Cygnal (R)	October 21–22, 2021	– (LV)	–	26%	34%	40%

Hypothetical polling

Katie Britt vs. Mike Durant

Poll source	Date(s) administered	Sample size	Margin of error	Katie Britt	Mike Durant	Undecided
Cygnal (R)	March 16–17, 2022	600 (LV)	± 4.0%	35%	47%	19%

Mo Brooks vs. Mike Durant

Poll source	Date(s) administered	Sample size	Margin of error	Mo Brooks	Mike Durant	Undecided
Cygnal (R)	March 16–17, 2022	600 (LV)	± 4.0%	23%	57%	20%

==== Results ====
Runoff results by county Britt: 50–60%; 60–70% 70–80% 80–90%; Brooks: 50–60%

Runoff results by precinct Britt: 50–60%; 60–70%; 70–80%; 80–90%; >90%; Brooks: 50–60%; 60–70%; 70–80%; 80–90%; >90%; Tie: 50%; No votes

Republican primary runoff results
Party	Candidate	Votes	%
Republican	Katie Britt	253,251	63.02%
Republican	Mo Brooks	148,636	36.98%
Total votes		401,887	100.0%

== Democratic primary ==
=== Candidates ===
==== Nominee ====
- Will Boyd, former Greenville, Illinois city councilor and nominee for lieutenant governor of Alabama in 2018

==== Eliminated in primary ====
- Brandaun Dean, principal at Campaign X Policy and former mayor of Brighton (2016–2017)
- Lanny Jackson, retired veteran, university administrator and candidate for mayor of Birmingham in 2017

==== Removed from ballot ====
- Victor Keith Williams, activist, former law instructor and Republican candidate for U.S. Senate in Virginia in 2020

==== Declined ====
- Doug Jones, former U.S. senator (2018–2021)
- Terri Sewell, U.S. representative for Alabama's 7th congressional district (2011–present) (ran for re-election)

=== Debates and forums ===
2022 Alabama Democratic U.S. Senate primary debates and forums
No.	Date	Host	Moderator	Link	Participants		
P Participant A Absent N Non-invitee I Invitee W Withdrawn							
P Participant A Absent N Non-invitee I Invitee W Withdrawn					Boyd	Dean	Jackson
1	Apr 07, 2022	DeKalb County Democratic Party	N/A	N/A	P	P	A
2	Apr 25, 2022	Calhoun County Chamber of Commerce	N/A	N/A	P	A	P

==== Endorsements ====
Will Boyd

Organizations

- Alabama Democratic Conference
- Alabama New South Alliance
- Barbour County Democrats
- District 20 United Mine Workers of America
- Jefferson County Millennials

=== Polling ===
Poll source	Date(s) administered	Sample size	Margin of error	Will Boyd	Brandaun Dean	Lanny Jackson	Victor Williams	Undecided
Emerson College	May 15–16, 2022	294 (LV)	± 5.7%	26%	15%	11%	–	49%
Emerson College	March 25–27, 2022	359 (LV)	± 5.1%	11%	5%	7%	11%	67%

=== Results ===
Results by county Boyd: 40–50%; 50–60%; 60–70%; 70–80%

Results by precinct Boyd: 30–40%; 40–50%; 50–60%; 60–70%; 70–80%; 80–90%; >90%; Dean: 30–40%; 40–50%; 50–60%; 60–70%; 70–80%; >90%; Jackson: 30–40%; 40–50%; 50–60%; 60–70%; 70–80%; 80–90%; >90%; Tie: 30–40%; 40–50%; 50%; No votes

Democratic primary results
Party	Candidate	Votes	%
Democratic	Will Boyd	107,588	63.72%
Democratic	Brandaun Dean	32,863	19.46%
Democratic	Lanny Jackson	28,402	16.82%
Total votes		168,853	100.0%

== Libertarian nomination ==
No primary was held for the Libertarian Party, and candidates were instead nominated by the party.

=== Candidates ===
==== Nominee ====
- John Sophocleus, former Auburn University professor and nominee for governor in 2002

== Independents ==
=== Candidates ===
==== Declared ====
- Adam Bowers, forestry professor at Lurleen B. Wallace Community College and U.S. Marine Corps veteran (unaffiliated, write-in)
- Jarmal Jabber Sanders, reverend (unaffiliated, write-in)

== General election ==
=== Predictions ===
Source	Ranking	As of
The Cook Political Report	Solid R	March 4, 2022
Inside Elections	Solid R	April 1, 2022
Sabato's Crystal Ball	Safe R	March 1, 2022
Politico	Solid R	April 1, 2022
RCP	Safe R	June 21, 2022
Fox News	Solid R	May 12, 2022
DDHQ	Solid R	July 20, 2022
538	Solid R	June 30, 2022
The Economist	Solid R	September 7, 2022

=== Post-primary endorsements ===
Katie Britt (R)

U.S. senators

- Marsha Blackburn, U.S. senator from Tennessee (2019–present)
- Tommy Tuberville, U.S. senator from Alabama (2021–present)

U.S. representatives

- Elise Stefanik, U.S. representative from New York's 21st congressional district (2015–present)

State officials

- Will Ainsworth, lieutenant governor of Alabama (2019–present)

Organizations

- Alabama Conservatives Fund
- Business Council of Alabama
- Mobile Law Enforcement Foundation
- National Right to Life Committee
- NRA Political Victory Fund
- Republican Jewish Coalition

PACs

- Farm PAC
Will Boyd (D)

Labor unions

- Alabama AFL–CIO
- United Auto Workers
- United Mine Workers of America

PACs

- The Collective PAC

=== Polling ===
Poll source	Date(s) administered	Sample size	Margin of error	Katie Britt (R)	Will Boyd (D)	John Sophocleus (L)	Undecided
Cygnal (R)	October 27–29, 2022	616 (LV)	± 3.94%	57%	28%	6%	-

=== Results ===
2022 United States Senate election in Alabama
Party	Candidate	Votes	%	±%
Republican	Katie Britt	942,154	66.62%	+2.66%
Democratic	Will Boyd	436,746	30.88%	−4.99%
Libertarian	John Sophocleus	32,879	2.32%	N/A
Write-in		2,459	0.17%	–
Total votes		1,414,238	100.00%	N/A
Republican hold				

==== By county ====
County	Katie Britt Republican		Will Boyd Democratic		Various candidates Other parties		Margin		Total
County	#	%	#	%	#	%	#	%	Total
Autauga	13,359	75.30%	3,814	21.50%	567	3.20%	9,545	53.80%	17,740
Baldwin	59,501	81.29%	11,478	15.68%	2,218	3.03%	48,023	65.61%	73,197
Barbour	3,861	59.01%	2,620	40.04%	62	0.95%	1,241	18.97%	6,543
Bibb	4,694	79.98%	971	16.54%	204	3.48%	3,723	63.43%	5,869
Blount	14,904	89.86%	1,130	6.81%	552	3.33%	13,774	83.05%	16,586
Bullock	785	29.69%	1,827	69.10%	32	1.21%	-1,042	-39.41%	2,644
Butler	3,789	64.12%	2,039	34.51%	81	1.37%	1,750	29.62%	5,909
Calhoun	22,008	73.16%	7,365	24.48%	708	2.35%	14,643	48.68%	30,081
Chambers	5,917	65.03%	2,997	32.94%	185	2.03%	2,920	32.09%	9,099
Cherokee	6,947	88.67%	761	9.71%	127	1.62%	6,186	78.95%	7,835
Chilton	10,386	85.38%	1,407	11.57%	371	3.05%	8,979	73.82%	12,164
Choctaw	3,198	62.05%	1,899	36.85%	57	1.11%	1,299	25.20%	5,154
Clarke	5,348	59.30%	3,613	40.06%	58	0.64%	1,735	19.24%	9,019
Clay	3,628	85.71%	505	11.93%	100	2.36%	3,123	73.78%	4,233
Cleburne	4,212	91.49%	308	6.69%	84	1.82%	3,904	84.80%	4,604
Coffee	11,411	81.52%	2,298	16.42%	289	2.06%	9,113	65.10%	13,998
Colbert	12,748	73.88%	4,181	24.23%	327	1.89%	8,567	49.65%	17,256
Conecuh	2,564	57.81%	1,830	41.26%	41	0.92%	734	16.55%	4,435
Coosa	2,662	69.76%	1,042	27.31%	112	2.94%	1,620	42.45%	3,816
Covington	9,852	87.40%	1,289	11.44%	131	1.16%	8,563	75.97%	11,272
Crenshaw	3,607	79.07%	895	19.62%	60	1.32%	2,712	59.45%	4,562
Cullman	23,228	88.92%	1,951	7.47%	944	3.61%	21,277	81.45%	26,123
Dale	9,458	78.82%	2,326	19.38%	215	1.79%	7,132	59.44%	11,999
Dallas	3,888	34.37%	7,312	64.65%	111	0.98%	-3,424	-30.27%	11,311
DeKalb	15,200	88.71%	1,679	9.80%	255	1.49%	13,521	78.91%	17,134
Elmore	20,167	78.35%	4,866	18.91%	706	2.74%	15,301	59.45%	25,739
Escambia	7,284	75.47%	2,247	23.28%	121	1.25%	5,037	52.19%	9,652
Etowah	20,599	78.95%	4,925	18.88%	568	2.18%	15,674	60.07%	26,092
Fayette	4,697	85.38%	690	12.54%	114	2.07%	4,007	72.84%	5,501
Franklin	6,547	88.02%	770	10.35%	121	1.63%	5,777	77.67%	7,438
Geneva	7,113	89.16%	763	9.56%	102	1.28%	6,350	79.59%	7,978
Greene	597	20.13%	2,337	78.79%	32	1.08%	-1,740	-58.66%	2,966
Hale	2,298	44.42%	2,790	53.93%	85	1.64%	-492	-9.51%	5,173
Henry	5,085	75.53%	1,560	23.17%	87	1.29%	3,525	52.36%	6,732
Houston	21,246	76.96%	5,854	21.20%	508	1.84%	15,392	55.75%	27,608
Jackson	11,617	86.88%	1,518	11.35%	237	1.77%	10,099	75.52%	13,372
Jefferson	91,802	46.40%	100,792	50.95%	5,238	2.65%	-8,990	-4.54%	197,832
Lamar	3,869	88.41%	447	10.21%	60	1.37%	3,422	78.20%	4,376
Lauderdale	19,893	76.84%	5,453	21.06%	542	2.09%	14,440	55.78%	25,888
Lawrence	8,573	79.91%	1,916	17.86%	239	2.23%	6,657	62.05%	10,728
Lee	26,966	66.45%	12,458	30.70%	1,158	2.85%	14,508	35.75%	40,582
Limestone	23,422	74.74%	7,037	22.45%	881	2.81%	16,385	52.28%	31,340
Lowndes	1,277	31.37%	2,734	67.16%	60	1.47%	-1,457	-35.79%	4,071
Macon	1,153	21.47%	4,131	76.91%	87	1.62%	-2,978	-55.45%	5,371
Madison	70,577	58.57%	45,976	38.15%	3,947	3.28%	24,601	20.42%	120,500
Marengo	3,807	52.41%	3,375	46.46%	82	1.13%	432	5.95%	7,264
Marion	7,636	91.05%	591	7.05%	160	1.91%	7,045	84.00%	8,387
Marshall	21,211	87.55%	2,461	10.16%	555	2.29%	18,750	77.39%	24,227
Mobile	64,378	60.11%	40,266	37.60%	2,456	2.29%	24,112	22.51%	107,100
Monroe	4,270	60.77%	2,678	38.12%	78	1.11%	1,592	22.66%	7,026
Montgomery	22,741	39.41%	33,685	58.37%	1,279	2.22%	-10,944	-18.97%	57,705
Morgan	25,310	78.84%	5,879	18.31%	916	2.85%	19,431	60.52%	32,105
Perry	898	28.27%	2,224	70.03%	54	1.70%	-1,326	-41.75%	3,176
Pickens	4,225	64.30%	2,248	34.21%	98	1.49%	1,977	30.09%	6,571
Pike	5,359	65.88%	2,661	32.71%	115	1.41%	2,698	33.17%	8,135
Randolph	5,471	83.18%	991	15.07%	115	1.75%	4,480	68.12%	6,577
Russell	5,967	51.68%	5,398	46.76%	180	1.56%	569	4.93%	11,545
Shelby	50,762	72.65%	16,276	23.29%	2,836	4.06%	34,486	49.35%	69,874
St. Clair	23,049	82.55%	3,933	14.09%	938	3.36%	19,116	68.47%	27,920
Sumter	1,163	30.01%	2,684	69.25%	29	0.75%	-1,521	-39.24%	3,876
Talladega	14,269	66.00%	6,891	31.87%	460	2.13%	7,378	34.13%	21,620
Tallapoosa	10,421	76.81%	2,914	21.48%	233	1.72%	7,507	55.33%	13,568
Tuscaloosa	31,879	61.75%	18,591	36.01%	1,156	2.24%	13,288	25.74%	51,626
Walker	15,206	85.33%	2,083	11.69%	532	2.99%	13,123	73.64%	17,821
Washington	4,557	77.53%	1,267	21.55%	54	0.92%	3,290	55.97%	5,878
Wilcox	1,329	34.86%	2,446	64.17%	37	0.97%	-1,117	-29.30%	3,812
Winston	6,309	91.40%	403	5.84%	191	2.77%	5,906	85.56%	6,903
Totals	942,154	66.62%	436,746	30.88%	35,338	2.50%	505,408	35.74%	1,414,238

===== Counties that flipped from Democratic to Republican =====
- Marengo (largest city: Demopolis)
- Russell (largest city: Phenix City)

==== By congressional district ====
Britt won six of seven congressional districts.

District	Britt	Boyd	Representative
1st	69%	29%	Jerry Carl
2nd	70%	28%	Barry Moore
3rd	71%	26%	Mike Rogers
4th	84%	14%	Robert Aderholt
5th	67%	30%	Mo Brooks (117th Congress)
5th	67%	30%	Dale Strong (118th Congress)
6th	67%	29%	Gary Palmer
7th	37%	61%	Terri Sewell

== See also ==
- List of United States senators from Alabama
- 2022 United States Senate elections
- 2022 United States House of Representatives elections in Alabama
- 2022 Alabama gubernatorial election
- 2022 Alabama lieutenant gubernatorial election
- 2022 Alabama Senate election
- 2022 Alabama House of Representatives election
- 2022 Alabama elections

== Notes ==
Partisan clients
