= Mo Brooks =

American politician (born 1954)

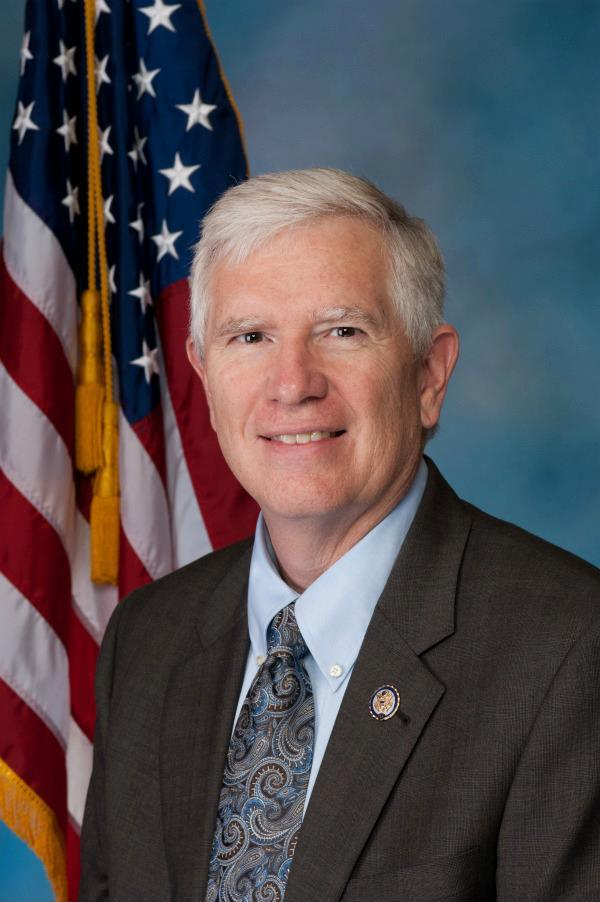
- Official portrait, 2011

Member of the U.S. House of Representatives from Alabama's 5th district
- In office January 3, 2011 – January 3, 2023
- Preceded by: Parker Griffith
- Succeeded by: Dale Strong

Member of the Madison County Commission from the 5th district
- In office 1996–2011
- Preceded by: Rob Colson
- Succeeded by: Phil Riddick

Member of the Alabama House of Representatives
- In office 1982–1992
- Preceded by: Frank Riddick (18th); Tom Drake (10th)
- Succeeded by: Charlie Britnell (18th); James Haney (10th)
- Constituency: 18th district (1982–1984); 10th district (1984–1992)

Personal details
- Born: Morris Jackson Brooks Jr. April 29, 1954 (age 72) Charleston, South Carolina, U.S.
- Party: Republican
- Spouse: Martha Jenkins (m. 1976)
- Children: 4
- Education: Duke University (BA); University of Alabama (JD)
- Brooks's voice Brooks on his prostate cancer. Recorded December 13, 2017

Morris Jackson Brooks Jr. (born April 29, 1954) is an American attorney and politician who served as the U.S. representative for Alabama's 5th congressional district from 2011 to 2023. His district was based in Huntsville and stretches across the northern fifth of the state. A member of the Republican Party, Brooks was a founding member of the Freedom Caucus.

In 2022, Brooks retired from the U.S. House of Representatives to run for the U.S. Senate seat vacated by Richard Shelby. Once a strong ally of President Donald Trump, Brooks was initially supported by Trump, but Trump rescinded his endorsement of Brooks candidacy in March 2022, claiming Brooks had "gone woke", after he made statements regarding moving past disproven claims of fraud about the 2020 election. In May, Brooks came in second in the Republican primary, behind Katie Britt, losing to her in the runoff. Since then, Brooks has been an outspoken critic of Trump.

He was a candidate in the 2026 election for the 20th Alabama House of Representatives district, but lost to incumbent representative James Lomax in the Republican primary.

== Early life, education, and legal career ==
Brooks was born in 1954 in Charleston, South Carolina, and moved to Huntsville, Alabama, in 1963. His mother, Betty J. (Noland) Brooks, taught economics and government for over 20 years at Lee High School, while he attended Grissom High School. His father, Morris Jackson "Jack" Brooks Sr., was raised in Chattanooga, Tennessee, and worked as an electrical engineer before retiring from Redstone Arsenal's Meteorology Center. They still live in Madison County, Alabama.

Brooks graduated from Grissom High School in 1972. He graduated from Duke University in three years with a double major in political science and economics, with highest honors in economics. Brooks received his J.D. degree from the University of Alabama School of Law in 1978.

Brooks started his legal career with the Tuscaloosa County district attorney's office. He left that office in 1980 to return to Huntsville as a law clerk for presiding circuit court Judge John David Snodgrass. During every year except when he was serving as a prosecutor or judicial clerk, Brooks was a practicing lawyer. In 1993, he became counsel to Leo and Associates, a business law firm with a national focus, founded by Karl W. Leo. He became a partner in the firm, which was reorganized as Leo & Brooks, LLC. He maintained a national practice that specialized in commercial litigation.

== Early political career ==
Brooks was elected to the Alabama House of Representatives in 1982 and reelected in 1983, 1986, and 1990. While in the legislature, Brooks was elected Republican house caucus chairman three times.

In 1991, Brooks was appointed Madison County district attorney, after the incumbent, Robert E. Cramer, was elected to Congress. In 1992, he ran for the office, but lost to Democrat Tim Morgan. A Republican had not been elected to the office since the Reconstruction era.

In 1995–96, Brooks was appointed state special assistant attorney general for Alabama attorney general Jeff Sessions. From 1996 to 2002, he was special assistant attorney general for attorney general Bill Pryor.

In 1996, Brooks ran for the Madison County commission and unseated an eight-year incumbent Republican. He was reelected to the commission in 2000, 2004, and 2008.

In 2006, Brooks unsuccessfully sought the Republican nomination for lieutenant governor of Alabama, coming in third behind eventual nominee Luther Strange and former state treasurer George Wallace Jr.

== U.S. House of Representatives ==
=== Elections ===
==== 2010 ====
Brooks won the Republican primary, receiving 51% of the vote, defeating incumbent (and former Democrat) Parker Griffith (33%) and conservative activist Les Phillip (16%).

The Republican National Committee named Brooks a "Young Gun" in 2010. Larry Sabato, Charlie Cook, and Real Clear Politics rated the race "Likely Republican". CQPolitics, Stuart Rothenberg, and the New York Times rated the race "Safe Republican". Nate Silver in the FiveThirtyEight.com New York Times blog predicted that there was a 94.1% chance that Brooks would defeat Democratic nominee Steve Raby.

Brooks won the general election, 58%–42%. He became the first freshman Republican to represent this district since Reconstruction.

==== 2012 ====
In January 2012, Parker Griffith, having switched parties, filed for a rematch against Brooks in the Republican primary. He said of the incumbent, "We'll contrast my time in Congress with my opponent's time in Congress. The distinction is clear. He has wandered away from many of the issues people want us to address". Brooks had the support of Phyllis Schlafly's Eagle Forum political action committee. He defeated Griffith in the rematch, 71%–29%. Brooks won all five counties.

==== 2014 ====
In the November 4, 2014, general election, Brooks faced independent candidate Mark Bray and won by a margin of 115,338 (74.4%) to 39,005 (25.2%).

==== 2016 ====
In the November 8, 2016, general election, Brooks faced Democratic nominee Will Boyd Jr. and won by a margin of 205,647 (66.7%) to 102,234 (33.2%).

==== 2017 ====
On May 15, 2017, Brooks announced his candidacy in the 2017 United States Senate special election. He ran against Luther Strange, a Republican appointed to the Senate by former Alabama Governor Robert Bentley after Senator Jeff Sessions was appointed U.S. attorney general.

Brooks was endorsed by talk-radio host Mark Levin, radio host Laura Ingraham, radio and television host Sean Hannity, and Congressman Mike Rogers.

In an interview with Yellowhammer News, Brooks touted his conservative record, saying that during the previous session of Congress, Heritage Action ranked him one of the Top Ten Best Congressmen on issues involving the "principles of free enterprise, limited government, individual freedom, traditional American values, and a strong national defense". The American Conservative Union ranked his record in the top 20% of all Congressmen, with an overall A grade during the last session of Congress, on issues relating to "liberty, personal responsibility, traditional value, and a strong national defense". The National Taxpayers Union ranked his record at the top of the Alabama Congressional delegation, tied with Byrne and Gary Palmer, on issues relating to "tax relief and reform, lower and less wasteful spending, individual liberty, and free enterprise". The Club for Growth ranked his record in the top 20% of all Congressmen on "economic policies that strengthen our nation's economy and shrink the size of the federal government". He was the Tea Party movement's preferred candidate.

Bentley initially decided to align the special election with the 2018 general election, but Kay Ivey, his successor, moved the date up to December 12, 2017, scheduling the primary for August 15 and primary runoff for September 26. In the Republican primary, Brooks lost to Strange and former Alabama Supreme Court Chief Justice Roy Moore, who advanced to the runoff. In his concession speech, he announced his reelection campaign for his congressional seat in 2018. He also "spoke more favorably of Moore and the race that he ran rather than Strange", but did not endorse a candidate.

Brooks declared he intended to vote for Moore on November 11, days after The Washington Post published a story alleging sexual abuse by Moore. In a text message to al.com on November 13, Brooks said, "Socialist Democrat Doug Jones will vote wrong. Roy Moore will vote right. Hence, I will vote for Roy Moore". He continued by invoking the Duke University lacrosse rape case, a story that he claimed to "vividly remember" because he had graduated from the university. Brooks then said:

As an attorney, I know accusations are easy. Proving them to the satisfaction of a judge, a jury, or here, voters, is another thing. I do not know enough of the evidence to know with confidence what the true facts are ... I do believe this, there are millions of people in America who would lie in a heartbeat if it meant adding another Democrat to the Senate.

Brooks was also critical of The Washington Post in a statement to The Decatur Daily, saying:

My view of The Washington Post is that they are part of the communications wing of the Democratic Party. They are hyper-partisan to the point that they are more than willing to lie to advance their left wing, amoral, socialist agenda. I've seen them do it firsthand of my own personal knowledge.

==== 2018 ====
In the November 6, 2018, general election, Brooks faced Democratic nominee Peter Joffrion and won by a margin of 159,063 (61%) to 101,388 (38.9%).

==== 2020 ====
In the November 3, 2020, general election, Brooks was reelected without major party opposition, as the ballot was uncontested.

=== Tenure ===
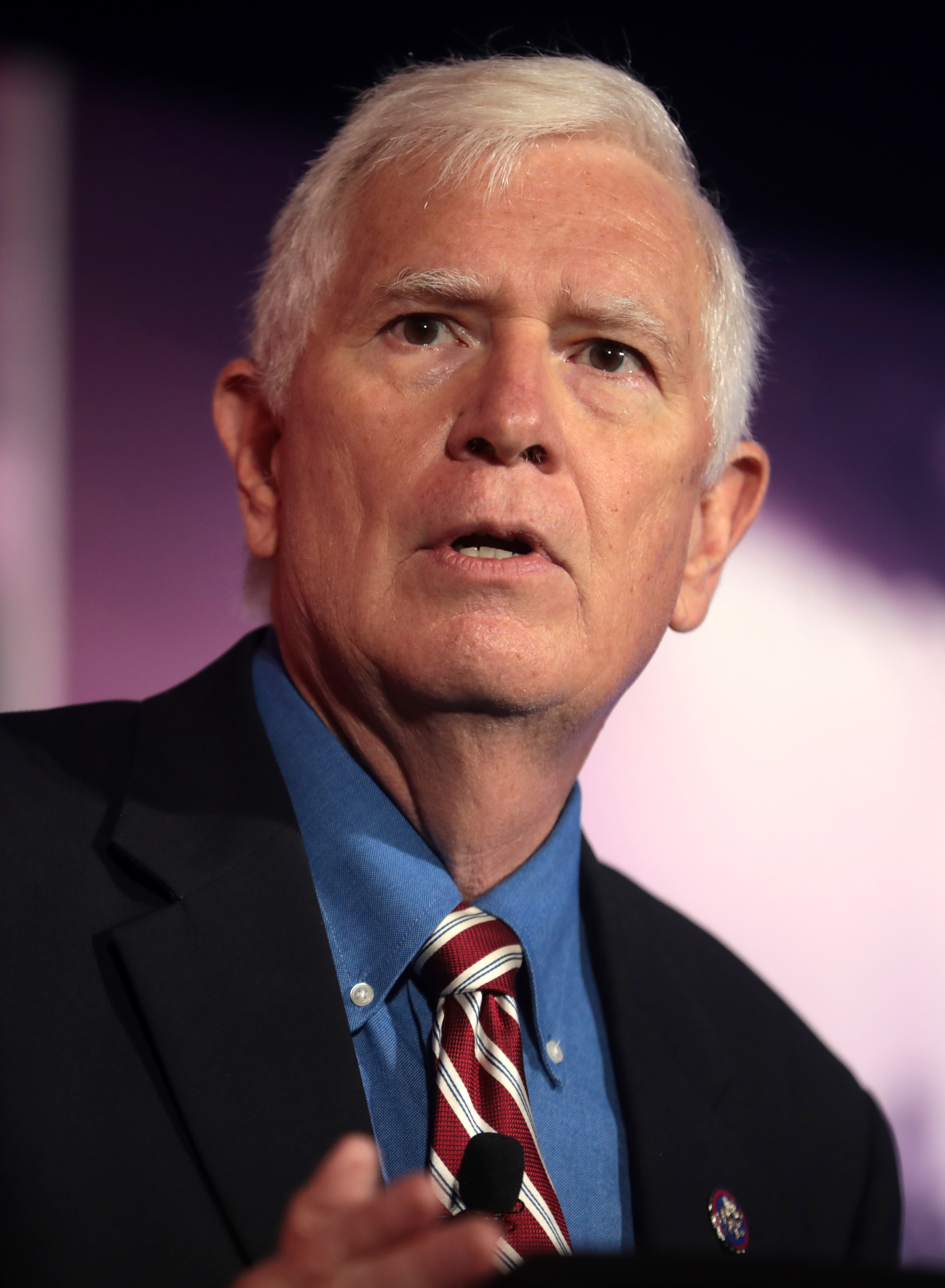
Brooks speaking at an event in September 2021

In February 2018, Brooks delivered a House floor speech and later released a statement through his office announcing his opposition to the spending bill that would ward off another United States federal government shutdown, saying the bill would do more harm than good by granting more funds than the United States could afford.

In April 2018, after Trump ordered missile strikes against Syria, Brooks confirmed that he was in favor of the strikes but would prefer the president "consult with Congress and obtain an unambiguous Authorization for the Use of Military Force from Congress before engaging in acts of war against a foreign nation" and said there was evidence the Assad regime had used chemical agents.

In July 2018, Brooks announced his support for Trump's nomination of Brett Kavanaugh to the United States Supreme Court, saying Kavanaugh was an excellent choice who "has an established record of upholding the Constitution and federal law without inserting his personal political views into his decisions. As such, I look forward to his quick confirmation by the Senate". "In my view, America is burdened with too many liberal, activist federal justices and judges who fail to abide by their role as limited by the Constitution, and I am pleased President Trump nominated a judge who understands the importance of limiting his role to that intended by America's founding fathers".

In July 2018, Brooks announced his support for Ohio Republican Congressman Jim Jordan amid allegations of ignoring claims of sexual abuse of athletes by a team doctor while Jordan was serving as a wrestling coach at The Ohio State University (OSU). In his statement, Brooks recounted his seven years working alongside Jordan and said Jordan had proved to him during that time that were he aware of the claims, he "would have done everything in his power to stop the inappropriate conduct". OSU opened an investigation in April 2018 that looked into allegations of sexual misconduct by the former wrestling team's physician, Richard Strauss, who was the physician when Jordan was an assistant coach. At least eight former wrestlers said that Jordan had been aware of, but did not respond to, allegations of sexual misconduct by Strauss.

On October 23, 2019, Brooks, Bradley Byrne and Jordan joined about two dozen other House Republicans in aggressively intruding upon that day's confidential hearing in a Sensitive Compartmented Information Facility (SCIF) where Republican and Democratic congressional members had been taking testimony from Deputy Assistant Secretary of Defense Laura Cooper. Brooks gave an incendiary speech before joining the non-committee Republicans forcing their way into the hearing in which he demanded, "By golly, if they are going to do it, do it in public. Don't hide it from the American people". One committee member said, "It was the closest thing I've seen around here to mass civil unrest as a member of Congress," as the conservatives had barged into the hearing room with prohibited electronic devices. Brooks said, "Show your face where we can all see the travesty that you are trying to foist on America and the degradation of our Republic that you're engaged in". Jordan said, "The members have just had it, and they want to be able to see and represent their constituents and find out what's going on". In the 116th Congress, the chair, Adam Schiff and 12 Democratic members of the House Intelligence Committee were appointed by the Speaker of the House, Nancy Pelosi, who is an ex officio committee member. The House Minority Leader, Kevin McCarthy, also an ex officio member, appointed the ranking member, Devin Nunes, and eight other Republicans to the committee. Each side gets equal time to question witnesses appearing before the committee. The disruption delayed Cooper's testimony by many hours.

Brooks and Byrne were the only Republican members of the Alabama House delegation to vote in October 2019 against a resolution condemning Trump for removing U.S. military forces from Syria, arguing that it had greatly endangered the effective Kurdish resistance to the Islamic State in Syria (ISIS).

In July 2021, Brooks voted against the bipartisan ALLIES Act, which would increase by 8,000 the number of special immigrant visas for Afghan allies of the U.S. military during its invasion of Afghanistan, while also reducing some application requirements that caused long application backlogs; the bill passed in the House 407–16.

As of October 2021, Brooks had voted in line with Joe Biden's stated position 7.5% of the time.

In October 2021, Business Insider reported that Brooks had violated the Stop Trading on Congressional Knowledge (STOCK) Act of 2012, a federal transparency and conflict-of-interest law, by failing to properly disclose a sale of stock in Pfizer Inc. worth up to $50,000. In December 2022, Brooks again violated the STOCK Act when he disclosed the purchase of a Duke Energy corporate bond months after a federal reporting deadline.

=== Committee assignments ===
- Committee on Armed Services
  - Subcommittee on Cyber, Innovative Technologies and Information Systems
  - Subcommittee on Strategic Forces
- Committee on Science, Space and Technology
  - Subcommittee on Space and Aeronautics

=== Caucus memberships ===
- Freedom Caucus
- Congressional Constitution Caucus
- Congressional Taiwan Caucus

== Political positions ==
In 2012, the National Journal ranked Brooks the 75th most conservative member of the U.S. House of Representatives.

=== Race issues ===
On August 4, 2014, Brooks was interviewed on The Laura Ingraham Show and responded to a clip of Ron Fournier warning that the Republican Party could not survive as the "party of white people". Brooks said, "Well, this is a part of the war on whites that's being launched by the Democratic Party ... And the way in which they're launching this war is by claiming that whites hate everybody else. It's part of the strategy that Barack Obama implemented in 2008, continued in 2012, where he divides us all on race, on sex, creed, envy, class warfare, all those kinds of things". His remark drew considerable comments and controversy. When asked about it later that day, Brooks repeated the claim of a "war on whites", saying, "In effect, what the Democrats are doing with their dividing America by race is they are waging a war on whites, and I find that repugnant". Two days after his original comment, Brooks added that the Republican Party was involved in a "war on whites".

=== Drugs ===
Brooks has a "B" rating from NORML for his voting record on cannabis-related matters. He has said that legalization of marijuana is a state issue and voted for bills to allow Veterans Health Administration doctors to discuss medical marijuana with patients and block the DEA from taking enforcement actions against medical marijuana in states that have legalized it.

=== Economy ===
In 2011, Brooks said, "Financial issues overshadow everything else going on in Washington. That one set of issues is sucking everything else out of the room".

Brooks supports changes to Social Security, including allowing individuals to invest some of their Social Security money in private retirement accounts. He has said that he does not support the full privatization of Social Security "because the stock market and many other investments are simply too volatile". Brooks also supports the plan Paul Ryan proposed to shift Medicare from a publicly run program to one managed by private insurers.

Brooks signed Grover Norquist's Americans for Tax Reform's Taxpayer Protection Pledge. He supports the Fair Tax proposal. In 2010, Brooks signed a pledge sponsored by Americans for Prosperity not to vote for any climate change legislation that would raise taxes.

At a monthly breakfast meeting of the Madison County Republican Men's Club, Brooks referred to the jobs bill President Obama proposed as the "Obama 'kill jobs' bill". He told the crowd that it added to the debt, promoted "frivolous lawsuits," and created new government agencies. He challenged Obama's promotion of the bill, saying, "If Barack Obama is serious about jobs, how about repealing Obamacare, dealing with illegal immigration and urging the Democratic-controlled Senate to pass pro-jobs bills that have already cleared in the House". At the same meeting, Brooks compared the recession of 2008 (and its after effects) with the Great Depression, saying that the problems associated with the Great Depression are "a cakewalk compared to what can happen to our country if we don't start acting responsibly in Washington, D.C., to try to get this deficit under control".

In 2020, Brooks was one of 48 members of Congress the National Taxpayers Union named a "Taxpayer's Friend" for tax-related votes.

=== Environment ===
In May 2018, Brooks claimed that land erosion played a significant role in sea level rise. "Every time you have that soil or rock or whatever it is that is deposited into the seas, that forces the sea levels to rise, because now you have less space in those oceans, because the bottom is moving up". The vast majority of the scientific community rejects this claim. At the hearing, Brooks also argued that the Antarctic ice sheet was growing. In actuality, while in the past it has grown, in recent years it has shrunk, and earlier growth does not disprove that climate change is occurring.

=== Foreign policy ===
Brooks has said, "we cannot continue to be the world police". He has expressed disappointment that the U.S. military did not leave Afghanistan immediately after Osama bin Laden's death on May 1, 2011.

Brooks disapproves of NATO military actions in Libya that the United States has been involved in. In 2011, he said, "I reject the president's position that the way to prevent Libyans from killing Libyans is by Americans killing Libyans". He voted against H.R. 2278 and after voting published the following statement: "We should be out of Libya altogether, and not voting piecemeal on parts of the operation. While this bill excludes some operations in Libya, it approves many others. The lesson from Vietnam is that the one sure way to lose a war is by fighting it half-way".

Brooks opposed the Electrify Africa Act of 2013, a bill that would direct the president to establish a multiyear strategy to help countries in sub-Saharan Africa develop a mix of power solutions to provide sufficient electricity access to people in rural and urban areas in order to alleviate poverty and drive economic growth. At a meeting of the House Foreign Affairs Committee, he said, "American taxpayers spend more than $40 billion per year on foreign aid ... Given America's out-of-control deficits and accumulated debt that threaten our economic future, I cannot justify American taxpayers building power plants and transmission lines in Africa with money we do not have, will have to borrow to get, and cannot afford to pay back".

In 2019, Brooks was one of 60 representatives to vote against condemning Trump's withdrawal from Syria.

In 2020, Brooks voted against the National Defense Authorization Act of 2021, which would prevent the president from withdrawing soldiers from Afghanistan without congressional approval.

In June 2021, Brooks was one of 49 House Republicans to vote to repeal the Authorization for Use of Military Force Against Iraq Resolution of 2002.

=== 2017 congressional baseball shooting ===
On June 14, 2017, at 7:09 am EDT, Brooks was practicing for the annual charity Congressional Baseball Game when James T. Hodgkinson opened fire on members of the Republican team, including House Majority Whip Steve Scalise. The practice was at the Eugene Simpson Baseball Fields in the Del Ray neighborhood of Alexandria, Virginia. Brooks used his belt as a tourniquet to help stop bleeding for a staffer who had been shot in the calf. After the shooting ended, Brooks and Representative Brad Wenstrup assisted Scalise by applying pressure to the wound until he could be evacuated. Brooks's name appeared on the shooter's assassination list.

Less than a week after the shooting, Brooks introduced the Congressional Self-Defense Act, allowing lawmakers to carry concealed weapons. In his press release, Brooks stated, "I believe all law-abiding citizens should be able to conceal carry". He has supported bills to allow national reciprocity. In July 2017, Brooks ran a campaign ad on YouTube featuring audio of the five shots from the attack. Steve Scalise's Chief of Staff strongly objected to the ad on Twitter.

=== Healthcare ===
Brooks opposes the Patient Protection and Affordable Care Act (also known as Obamacare) and has said that the committee that passed it did not understand it. He signed the Club for Growth's "Repeal-It!" pledge that stated that upon his election to Congress he would "sponsor and support legislation to repeal any federal health care takeover passed in 2010, and replace it with real reforms that lower health care costs without growing government". He was also endorsed by the website Defundit.org for his stance on Obamacare. Brooks co-sponsored H.R. 127, which would have removed all funding from the Patient Protection and Affordable Care Act, the Health Care and Education Reconciliation Act of 2010, and any amendments made by either act.

In March 2017, Brooks said that he would not vote for the American Health Care Act, the GOP's initial plan to replace the Affordable Care Act. He said, "I will vote against the American Health Care Act because it has more bad policy than any bill I have ever faced". But on May 4, 2017, Brooks voted for the American Health Care Act, which would repeal the Affordable Care Act.

In an interview with CNN's Jake Tapper, Brooks controversially argued that the AHCA "will allow insurance companies to require people who have higher health care costs to contribute more to the insurance pool. That helps offset all these costs, thereby reducing the cost to those people who lead good lives, they're healthy, they've done the things to keep their bodies healthy. And right now, those are the people—who've done things the right way—that are seeing their costs skyrocketing".

After Congress failed to repeal the Affordable Care Act, Brooks said, "we have Republicans who do not want to repeal Obamacare. They may have campaigned that way, they may have voted that way a couple of years ago when it didn't make any difference".

According to a survey by the Christian Coalition, Brooks also opposes government-run health care. He voted yes on repealing the Prevention and Public Health Fund in the Patient Protection and Affordable Care Act.

=== Immigration ===
Brooks has been endorsed by Americans for Legal Immigration (ALI), a political action committee (PAC). The anti-immigration organization NumbersUSA gave him a 100% score. Brooks has sponsored or co-sponsored 112 immigration-related bills since taking office in January 2011. He has also said that he feels Congress will probably do nothing about illegal immigration in the coming years.

Brooks opposes allowing illegal immigrants to remain in the United States. As part of his 2010 campaign, he advocated getting the federal government "out of the way so state and local governments can help solve the problem". He advocated making it "unprofitable" for employers to hire illegal immigrants over American citizens. In 2014, he called for the deportation of 8 million illegal immigrants, as well as 500,000 DACA recipients.

On June 29, 2011, reporter Venton Blandin of WHNT-TV asked Brooks to repeat what he had previously stated at a town hall meeting about illegal immigrants. Brooks repeated his previous statement, saying, "As your congressman on the House floor, I will do anything short of shooting them. Anything that is lawful, it needs to be done because illegal aliens need to quit taking jobs from American citizens".

In May 2015, Brooks sponsored an amendment to strip a particular provision in the National Defense Authorization Act, thereby preventing the Department of Defense from allowing "Dreamers" (undocumented youth who received temporary legal status under the Deferred Action for Childhood Arrivals program) to enlist in the armed services. Brooks stated his opposition to illegal immigrants serving in the military, saying, "These individuals have to be absolutely 100 percent loyal and trustworthy, as best as we can make them, 'cause they're gonna have access to all sorts of military weaponry—even to the point of having access to weapons of mass destruction like our nuclear arsenal. And I'm gonna have much greater faith in the loyalty of an American citizen than a person who is a citizen of a foreign nation". He said Birmingham, a city where Alabama's strict immigration law has been criticized, needed to prepare to spend more money if it wants to be a sanctuary city. He told Blandin, "They need to start picking up the tab that American citizens are having to pick up. If Birmingham wants to be a sanctuary city, or wants to head in that direction, that is their decision. They are absolutely wrong".

On January 6, 2021, just hours after Trump supporters attacked the United States Capitol, Brooks claimed that over 1 million illegal immigrants voted for Joe Biden in the 2020 United States presidential election and objected to counting Arizona's electoral votes on that basis. According to Brooks, Biden promised to create a pathway to citizenship for illegal immigrants in order to get their votes.

Brooks voted against the Fairness for High-Skilled Immigrants Act of 2019, which would amend the Immigration and Nationality Act to eliminate the per-country numerical limitation for employment-based immigrants, to increase the per-country numerical limitation for family-sponsored immigrants, and for other purposes.

Brooks voted against the Further Consolidated Appropriations Act of 2020 which authorizes DHS to nearly double the available H-2B visas for the remainder of FY 2020.

=== Juneteenth ===
In June 2021, Brooks was one of 14 House Republicans to vote against legislation to establish June 19, or Juneteenth, as a federal holiday. His rationale for his vote was that the holiday's date was too exclusive and significant only to Texas, and that the freeing of slaves should be celebrated on another day.

=== Media ===
Brooks voted to terminate funding for National Public Radio.

=== Michael Flynn ===
Brooks believes that National Security Advisor Michael Flynn was "set up" by "FBI partisan hacks" and that Flynn's trial "was a miscarriage of justice". He supports assigning a special prosecutor to investigate the federal case against Flynn, in which Flynn pleaded guilty to making false statements to the FBI.

Flynn initially endorsed Brooks in the 2022 United States Senate election in Alabama but subsequently switched his support to Michael Durant.

=== National security ===
Brooks supports the National Security Agency's power to collect telephone metadata on Americans, saying its potential to thwart terrorist attacks outweighs potential infringements on privacy. But in 2014, he voted for the USA Freedom Act, which, according to its sponsor, would "rein in the dragnet collection of data by the National Security Agency (NSA) and other government agencies, increase transparency of the Foreign Intelligence Surveillance Court (FISC), provide businesses the ability to release information regarding FISA requests, and create an independent constitutional advocate to argue cases before the FISC".

=== Regulatory reform ===
In December 2011, Brooks voted in support of H.R. 10, the "Regulations from the Executive In Need of Scrutiny Act," which would have required Congressional approval for any "major regulations" issued by the executive branch but, unlike the 1996 Congressional Review Act, would not require the president's signature or override of a probable presidential veto.

=== Socialism ===
In April 2011, Brooks said in a congressional speech, "Folks, we are here today forcing this issue because America is at risk. We are at risk of insolvency and bankruptcy because the socialist members of this body choose to spend money that we do not have". After this remark, Democratic Congressman Keith Ellison asked that Brooks's comments be "taken down". Brooks said that he had the choice to either have the comment stricken from the record or defend the remark and wait until later in the day for a formal ruling over whether the comment was appropriate. Brooks chose to have the remark withdrawn before he continued with his speech. Ellison accepted the withdrawal. Afterward, Brooks said that he did not regret his initial remark and thought those who objected to his comment, particularly Democrats, were "thin-skinned". He said, "People could quite clearly infer that socialism is what the other guys are promoting". Brooks has called Pete Buttigieg, Amy Klobuchar, Kimberly Gardner, Nancy Pelosi, Alexandria Ocasio-Cortez, Bernie Sanders, Bill de Blasio, and others socialists.

=== Tax reform ===
Brooks voted for the Tax Cuts and Jobs Act of 2017, saying the bill was a way "to put more money into the pockets of working Alabamians at all income levels" and that it would "spur much-needed economic growth that will both help with America's deficit and debt crisis".

=== Donald Trump ===
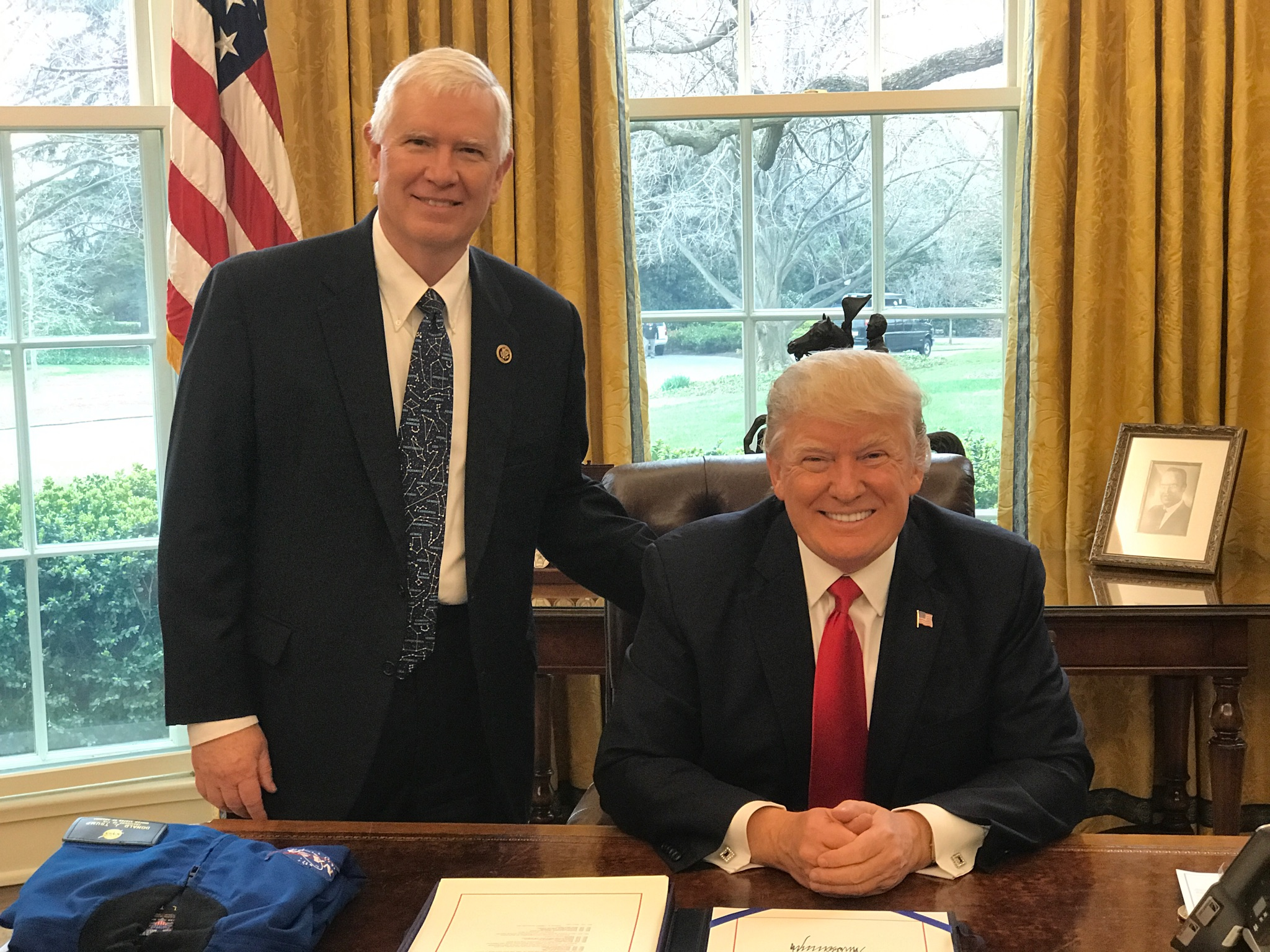
Brooks with Donald Trump in the Oval Office, 2017

In May 2018, during the Republican primary for Brooks's seat, he said he was a Trump supporter in response to accusations from his opponent that Brooks had previously criticized Trump. Trump endorsed Brooks's 2018 reelection, saying Brooks "fought by my side to secure our border, rebuild our military, cut our taxes, repeal ObamaCare, and build the wall!". Brooks also opposed Trump's first impeachment. On March 25, 2019, shortly after Attorney General William Barr's summary of the Mueller report was released, Brooks read a passage from Adolf Hitler's 1925 autobiography Mein Kampf on the House floor, comparing the Democratic Party and the media to the Nazi Party.

In April 2021, Trump announced his endorsement of Brooks's 2022 Senate campaign. In March 2022, Trump rescinded his endorsement. Brooks later said Trump had asked him to remove Joe Biden, who had defeated Trump in the November 2020 presidential election, but Brooks said he refused because the January 6, 2021, certification by Congress was final.

Since his loss in the 2022 U.S. Senate race, Brooks has been critical of Trump. He had argued that the 2024 presidential election would have candidates who are "vastly superior" to Trump and more directly attacked him as "dishonest, disloyal, incompetent", and "crude". Trump would later win the Republican nomination. In December 2022, Brooks suggested that charges of fraud against The Trump Organization had merit.

During the 2025 shutdown of the federal government, Speaker Mike Johnson, a Trump ally, after an Arizona U.S. House special election in which Democrat Adelita Grijalva won in a landslide, refused to seat her on the grounds that precedent states that elected members of congress are not sworn in during special or pro forma sessions. Critics in the media and Democrats argued that this was due to Grijalva's stated intention to be the 218th signature on the Massie-Khanna discharge petition, which intends to force a release of the Epstein files, being the final vote needed to force the bill to the floor. Brooks in an editorial criticized Johnson and his other Republican former colleagues, writing: "I'm a Republican. The House Speaker is a Republican. Adelita Grijalva is a Democrat. But what is right is right, and what the Republican House Speaker is doing to Democrat Adelita Grijalva is wrong. Period." Grijalva thanked him for his remarks in a social media post.

=== Defense ===
In September 2021, Brooks was among 75 House Republicans to vote against the National Defense Authorization Act of 2022, which contains a provision that would require women to be drafted.

== Other events ==
=== 2016 presidential election ===
On November 9, 2015, Brooks endorsed Ted Cruz for President of the United States, and served as Chairman of the Cruz campaign's Alabama leadership team.

On September 9, 2016, Brooks said that Hillary Clinton "betrayed her country by exposing national security information to risk by our adversaries. That is a criminal offense. That makes it an impeachable offense. ... Hillary Clinton has, in my opinion, committed a high crime or misdemeanor or treason".

=== 2020 presidential election ===
After Joe Biden was projected the winner of the 2020 presidential election, Brooks staunchly defended Trump and made claims of fraud. He argued that most mail-in voting was unconstitutional, and that "if only lawful votes by eligible American citizens were cast, Donald Trump won the Electoral College by a significant margin". His assertions that the election was stolen by extraordinary voter fraud and election theft measures were unsupported by evidence.

On December 10, 2020, Brooks was one of 126 Republican members of the U.S. House of Representatives to sign an amicus brief in support of Texas v. Pennsylvania, a lawsuit filed at the United States Supreme Court contesting the results of the 2020 presidential election. The Supreme Court declined to hear the case on the basis that Texas lacked standing under Article III of the Constitution to challenge the results of an election held by another state. House Speaker Nancy Pelosi issued a statement that called signing the amicus brief an act of election subversion. She also reprimanded Brooks and the other House members who supported the lawsuit: "The 126 Republican Members that signed onto this lawsuit brought dishonor to the House. Instead of upholding their oath to support and defend the Constitution, they chose to subvert the Constitution and undermine public trust in our sacred democratic institutions".

In March 2022, one year into Biden's term, Brooks acknowledged that "the law doesn’t permit" him, as a congressperson, to work to remove Biden and install Trump. Anyone telling Trump that there are such "mechanisms" for replacing a president, he said, is "misleading" Trump.

=== 2021 Capitol attack ===
Brooks was the first member of Congress to announce his objection to the January 6, 2021, certification of the Electoral College results. In December he organized a series of White House meetings between Trump and a dozen Republican lawmakers to strategize about how to overturn the election results on January 6. On that date, he was the first speaker at a pro-Trump rally.

In his speech at the Capitol, Brooks harshly criticized other Republicans in Congress for not aiding him in his efforts to overturn the election and said, "Today is the day American patriots start taking down names and kicking ass". At the rally, Trump gave an hourlong speech claiming that the election had been stolen and urging people to go to the U.S. Capitol to "peacefully and patriotically make your voices heard". The crowd did so, and shortly thereafter, some of the protesters stormed the Capitol. Later that night, Congress reassembled to certify the Electoral College vote; Brooks raised an objection to Nevada's votes, but it did not succeed because no senator joined him in objecting. Despite cheering on the riot as it happened, Brooks later said the rioters were associated with antifa, citing a Washington Times report that was later retracted.

On January 11, District of Columbia Attorney General Karl Racine said that he was looking at whether to charge Brooks, along with Rudy Giuliani and Donald Trump Jr., with inciting the violent attack.

Brooks was one of six Republican members of Congress who sought pardons from Trump at the end of January, in the last days of Trump's presidency.

On March 5, 2021, Representative Eric Swalwell filed a civil lawsuit against Brooks and three others (Donald Trump, Donald Trump Jr., and Rudy Giuliani), seeking damages for their alleged role in inciting the riot. Brooks tried to claim immunity on the basis that he had given the speech on January 6 only in his capacity as a federal employee, but the Justice Department ruled the speech was not part of his duties as a member of Congress. In a sworn affidavit, Brooks stated that his fiery language in the speech was about the 2022 and 2024 elections. On March 9, 2022, a federal judge dismissed Swalwell's lawsuit, ruling that Brooks's speech was protected by the First Amendment.

== 2022 Senate campaign ==
On March 22, 2021, Brooks announced his candidacy for the U.S. Senate seat being vacated by the retiring Richard Shelby (R) in 2022. He positioned himself as a staunch ally of Trump, repeated Trump's false claim that the 2020 election was stolen, and alleged that socialists were taking over the government.

Trump endorsed Brooks in April 2021, but rescinded his endorsement in March 2022 when Brooks refused to "immediately" remove Biden from office and illegally hold a new presidential election.

On May 24, Brooks placed second in the primary, behind Katie Britt. Since no candidate received 50% of the vote, a runoff was held on June 21. Brooks received 148,636 votes to Britt's 253,251.

The House committee investigating the January 6 attack subpoenaed Brooks on May 12, 2022. On June 23, the day after he lost the primary in his Senate campaign, he announced his willingness to publicly testify before the committee.

== Electoral history ==
Alabama Republican primary, 5th congressional district, 2010
Party	Candidate	Votes	%
Republican	Mo Brooks	35,746	50.8
Republican	Parker Griffith (incumbent)	23,525	33.4
Republican	Les Phillip	11,085	15.8
Total votes		70,356	100.0

Alabama 5th congressional district election, 2010
Party	Candidate	Votes	%
Republican	Mo Brooks	131,109	57.2
Democratic	Steve Raby	95,192	42.1
Total votes		226,301	100.0
Republican hold			

Alabama Republican primary, 5th congressional district, 2012
Party	Candidate	Votes	%
Republican	Mo Brooks (incumbent)	65,123	70.9
Republican	Parker Griffith	26,680	29.1
Total votes		91,803	100.0

Alabama 5th congressional district election, 2012
Party	Candidate	Votes	%
Republican	Mo Brooks (incumbent)	189,185	64.9
Democratic	Charlie Holley	101,772	34.9
Write-in		336	0.1
Total votes		291,293	100.0
Republican hold			

Alabama Republican primary, 5th congressional district, 2014
Party	Candidate	Votes	%
Republican	Mo Brooks	49,117	80.3
Republican	Jerry Hill	12,038	19.7
Total votes		61,155	100.0

Alabama 5th congressional district election, 2014
Party	Candidate	Votes	%
Republican	Mo Brooks	115,338	74.4
Independent	Mark Bray	39,005	25.2
Write-in		631	0.4
Total votes		154,974	100.0
Republican hold			

Alabama 5th congressional district election, 2016
Party	Candidate	Votes	%
Republican	Mo Brooks	205 647	66.7
Democratic	Will Boyd	102,234	33.2
Write-in		445	0.1
Total votes		308,326	100.0
Republican hold			

Republican primary results
Party	Candidate	Votes	%
Republican	Roy Moore	164,524	38.9%
Republican	Luther Strange (incumbent)	138,971	32.8%
Republican	Mo Brooks	83,287	19.7%
Republican	Trip Pittman	29,124	6.9%
Republican	Randy Brinson	2,978	0.6%
Republican	Bryan Peeples	1,579	0.4%
Republican	Mary Maxwell	1,543	0.4%
Republican	James Beretta	1,078	0.3%
Republican	Dom Gentile	303	0.1%
Republican	Joseph Breault	252	0.1%
Total votes		423,282	100.0%

Alabama Republican primary, 5th congressional district, 2018
Party	Candidate	Votes	%
Republican	Mo Brooks (incumbent)	54,928	61.3
Republican	Clayton Hinchman	34,739	38.7
Total votes		89,667	100.0

Alabama 5th congressional district election, 2018
Party	Candidate	Votes	%
Republican	Mo Brooks	159,063	61.0
Democratic	Peter Joffrion	101,388	38.9
Write-in		222	0.1
Total votes		260,673	100.0
Republican hold			

Alabama's 5th congressional district Republican primary, 2020
Party	Candidate	Votes	%
Republican	Mo Brooks (incumbent)	83,740	74.9
Republican	Chris Lewis	28,113	25.1
Total votes		111,853	100.0

== Personal life ==
Brooks met Martha Jenkins of Toledo, Ohio, at Duke University. They were married in 1976. She graduated from the University of Alabama with a degree in accounting. In 2004, she attended the University of Alabama in Huntsville for a degree in teaching. She has retired from teaching math at Whitesburg Middle School in Huntsville. They have two sons, two daughters, and ten grandchildren.

Brooks joined the LDS Church in 1978, and though he still attends Mormon services with his wife, he considers himself a non-denominational Christian.

On December 13, 2017, Brooks revealed in a House floor speech that he has prostate cancer.

== See also ==
- List of United States representatives from Alabama
- Sedition Caucus

U.S. House of Representatives
Preceded by Parker Griffith	Member of the U.S. House of Representatives from Alabama's 5th congressional district 2011–2023	Succeeded by Dale Strong
U.S. order of precedence (ceremonial)
Preceded by Adam Kinzinger as Former U.S. Representative	Order of precedence of the United States as Former U.S. Representative	Succeeded by Tom Allen as Former U.S. Representative
