= Michael Durant =

American combat pilot (born 1961)

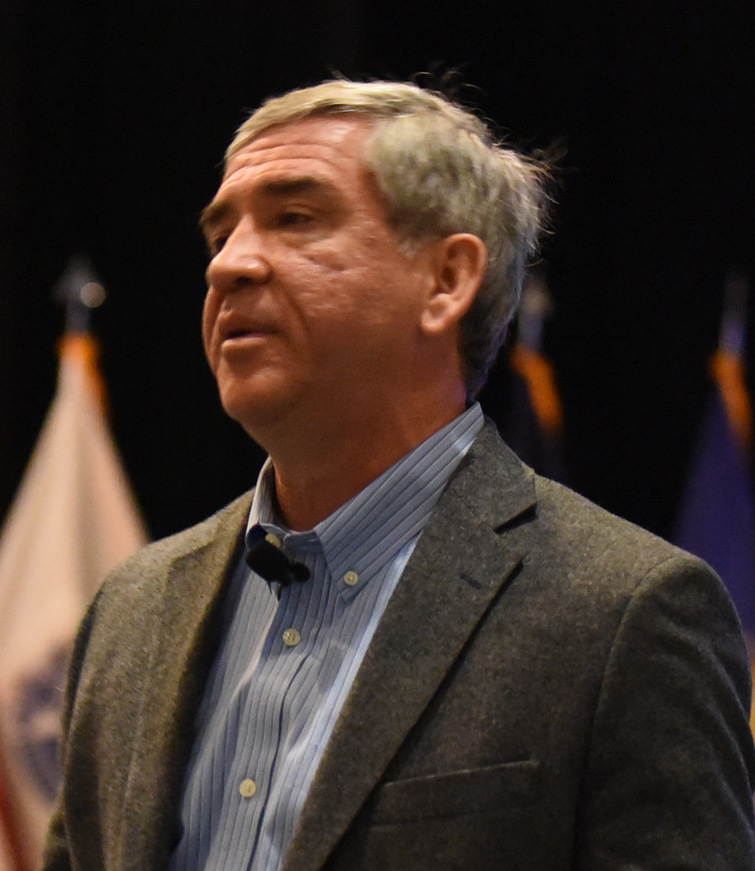
- Durant in 2017

Personal details
- Born: July 23, 1961 (age 65) Berlin, New Hampshire, U.S.
- Party: Republican
- Education: Embry–Riddle Aeronautical University (BS, MBA)

Military service
- Allegiance: United States
- Branch/service: United States Army
- Years of service: 1979–2001
- Rank: Chief Warrant Officer 4
- Unit: 101st Aviation Regiment; 160th Special Operations Aviation Regiment
- Battles/wars: Operation Prime Chance; Operation Just Cause; Gulf War; Operation Gothic Serpent: Battle of Mogadishu
- Awards: Army Distinguished Service Medal; Distinguished Flying Cross (3); Bronze Star Medal; Purple Heart; Prisoner of War Medal

Michael John Durant (born July 23, 1961) is an American veteran, former pilot, businessman, author, and former political candidate. He fought in the 1993 Battle of Mogadishu while serving as a U.S. Army pilot, and ran unsuccessfully in the Republican primary for the 2022 United States Senate election in Alabama.

Durant was a member of the 160th Special Operations Aviation Regiment (Night Stalkers). He participated in several combat operations, including Prime Chance, Just Cause, Desert Storm, and 1993's Gothic Serpent, during which he was held prisoner for 11 days. Promoted from Chief Warrant Officer 3, he retired in 2001 as a Chief Warrant Officer 4 Black Hawk helicopter Master Aviator.

In retirement, Durant published a book detailing his experiences, gave talks, and founded an engineering company in Huntsville, Alabama. He became politically active as a member of the Republican Party.

== Early life and military training ==
Durant was born on July 23, 1961, in Berlin, New Hampshire, the son of Leon Durant and Louise (née Boucher). He enlisted in the U.S. Army in August 1979; after completing basic training, he attended the Defense Language Institute. He was assigned to the 470th Military Intelligence Group at Fort Clayton in Panama as a Spanish voice intercept operator. Durant finished helicopter flight training at Fort Rucker, Alabama. During flight school, he flew the TH-55 trainer and UH-1 helicopters.

== U.S. Army service ==
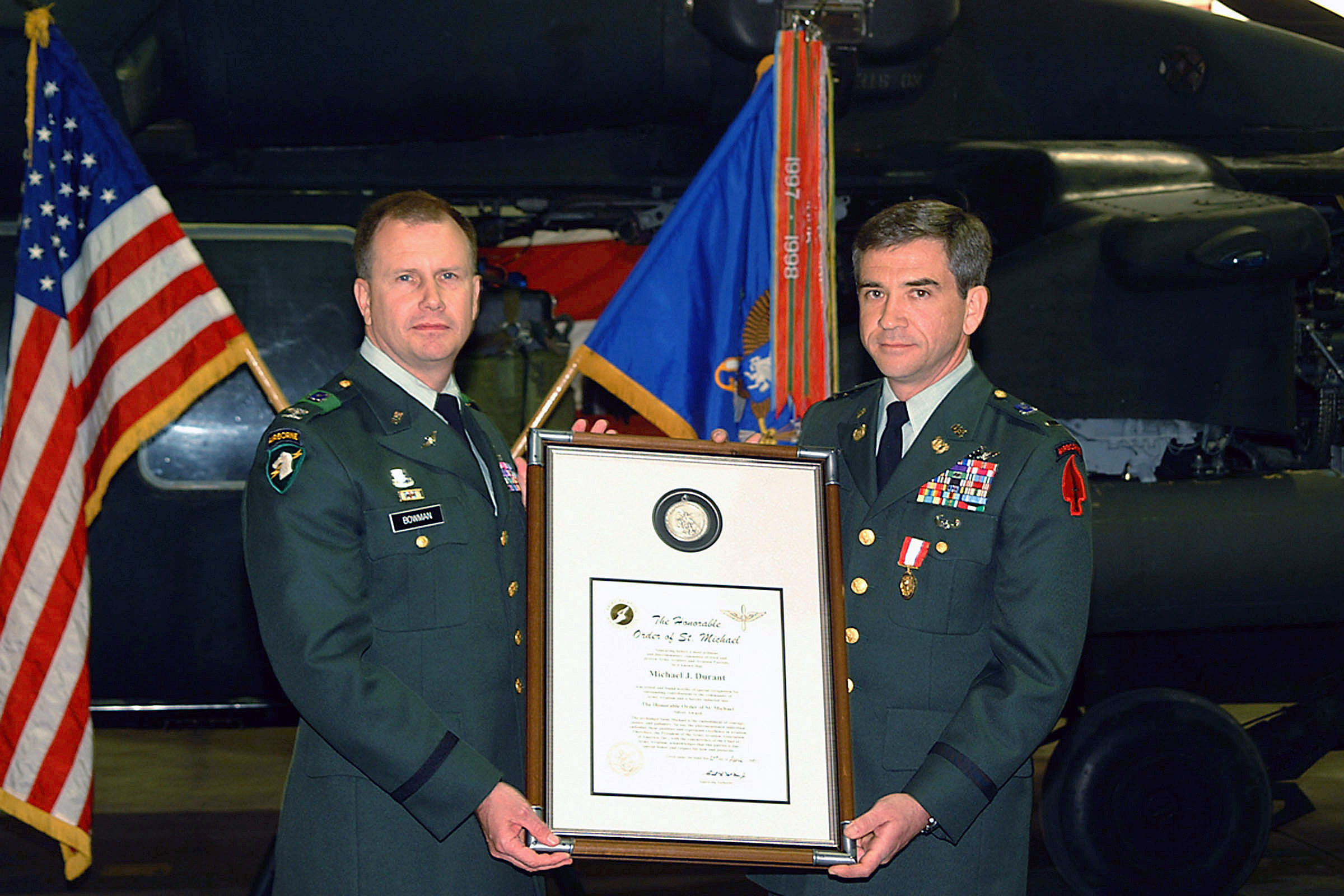
Durant presented with the Honorable Order of St. Michael in 2001

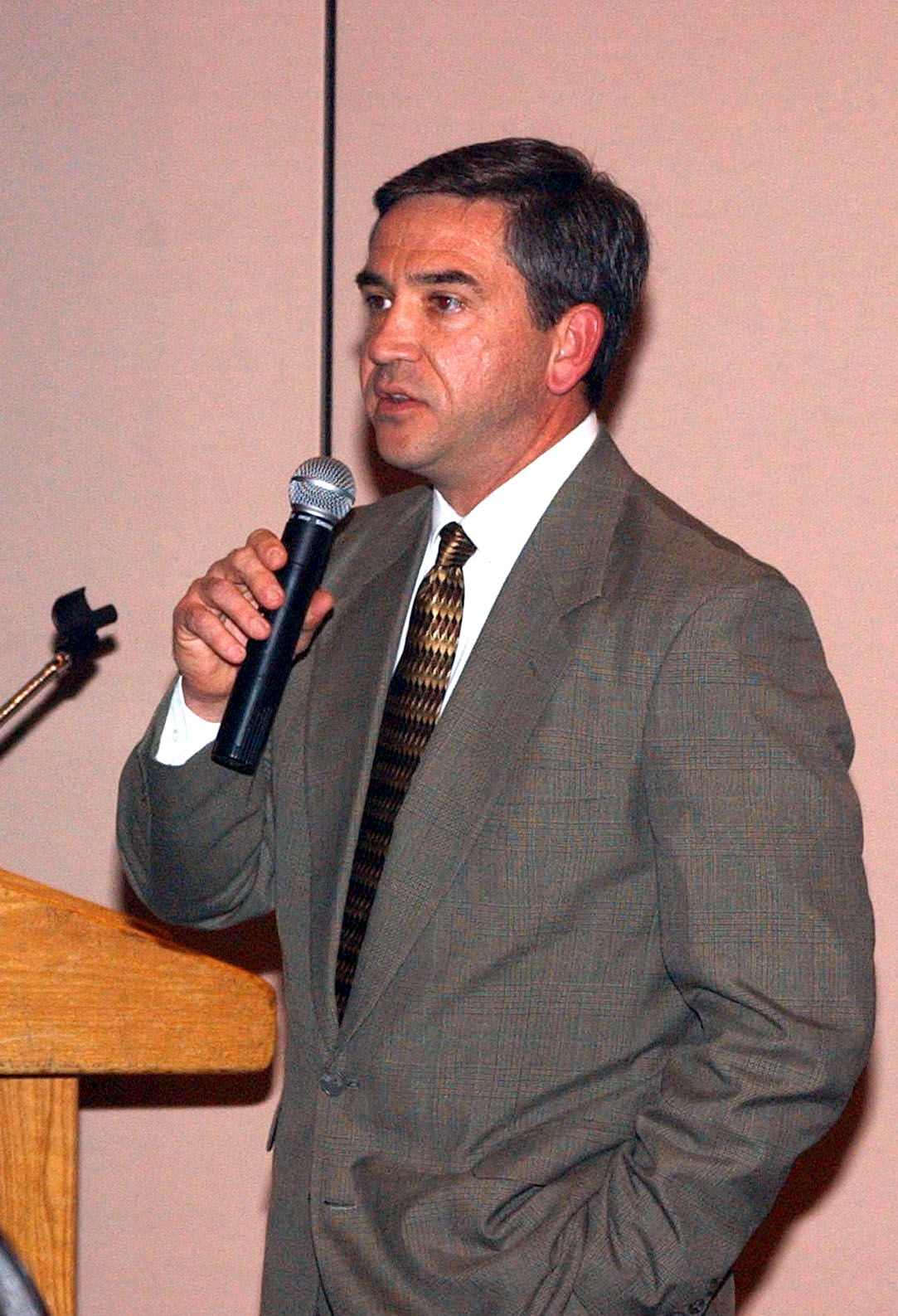
Durant speaks to officers at Tyndall Air Force Base in 2002

In November 1983, Durant completed the UH-60 Black Hawk Aviators Qualification Course, was promoted to Warrant Officer 1, and was assigned to the 377th Medical Evacuation Company in Seoul, South Korea. By 1985, Durant had flown more than 150 medical evacuation missions in the UH-1 and UH-60 helicopters. He was later assigned to the 101st (Division) Aviation Battalion at Fort Campbell, Kentucky. While serving as a Chief Warrant Officer 2, he took the flight instructor's pilot course and conducted air assault missions in the UH-60. Durant joined the 160th Special Operations Aviation Regiment (SOAR) on August 1, 1988. Assigned to D Company, he performed duties as Flight Lead and Standardization Instructor Pilot. He participated in combat operations Prime Chance, Just Cause, and Operation Desert Storm, where he was the first U.S. helicopter pilot to shoot at a SCUD missile launcher.

=== "Black Hawk Down" incident ===
During Operation Gothic Serpent in Somalia, Durant was the pilot of helicopter "Super Six Four.” His was the second of two MH-60L Black Hawk helicopters shot down during the Battle of Mogadishu on October 3, 1993. After his helicopter's tail was hit by an RPG-7, it crashed about a mile southwest of the operation's target.

Durant and his crew of three, Bill Cleveland, Ray Frank, and Tommy Field, were badly injured in the crash. Durant suffered a crushed vertebra in his back and a compound fracture of his left femur. Three Delta Force snipers, MSG Gary Gordon, SFC Randy Shughart and MSG Brad Halling had been providing suppressive fire from the air at hostile Somalis who were converging on the crash site. All three volunteered for insertion onto the ground to protect the crew and join Durant in fighting off the advancing Somalis, although Halling took over the Blackhawk's minigun after a crew chief was injured before permission was granted and only Gordon and Shugart were inserted. The pair killed numerous Somalis before they ran out of ammunition. They were soon overwhelmed and killed, after Cleveland, Frank and Field had died. Gordon and Shughart received the Medal of Honor posthumously for their heroism in this action.

The hostile Somalis captured Durant, the sole American survivor, and held him captive for 11 days. During much of his imprisonment, he was personally protected and cared for by Abdullahi "Firimbi" Hassan, a physician and propaganda minister to Somali General Mohamed Farrah Aidid, though he was shot in his arm by an intruding militia member. Aidid then released Durant and a Nigerian soldier who had been captured previously into the custody of the International Committee of the Red Cross.

After being freed, and recovering at Landstuhl Regional Medical Center (LRMC) in Germany, Durant resumed flying with the 160th SOAR. He retired from the Army in 2001 with more than 3,700 flight hours, over 1,400 of which were flown with night vision goggles.

Durant's military service awards include the Distinguished Service Medal, Distinguished Flying Cross with Oak Leaf Cluster, Bronze Star with Valor Device, Purple Heart, Meritorious Service Medal, three Air Medals and the Prisoner of War Medal, among others.

== Business ventures and writing ==
After his retirement, Durant moved to Alabama and began offering seminars to military personnel about helicopter maneuvering and combat search and rescue (CSAR) operations. Durant talked about the Somalia raid and his experiences in captivity. He spoke extensively with actor Ron Eldard, who portrayed him in the 2001 film Black Hawk Down, which depicts the events of the raid.

In 2003, Durant published a book, In the Company of Heroes, in which he chronicled his military career and his captivity.

Durant holds a BSc degree in professional aeronautics and an MBA degree in aviation management from the Embry–Riddle Aeronautical University. In 2008, he became owner, president and CEO of Pinnacle Solutions, an engineering services company based in Huntsville, Alabama. The company's clients include the U.S. Navy, the U.S. Marine Corps and NASA. In December 2021, after he began running for U.S. Senate, Durant turned over control of Pinnacle Solutions to its employees via an employee stock ownership plan.

== Political career ==
=== Early activities ===
Durant became involved in politics after his retirement from the military; as a Republican, he served on the presidential campaigns of George W. Bush in 2004 and John McCain in 2008, both times in a veterans' leadership role.

In July 2008, Durant criticized then-presidential candidate Barack Obama for having cancelled a planned trip to LRMC near Ramstein Air Base where he had intended, while in Europe, to visit American casualties of the Iraq and Afghanistan wars. Durant said he thought this was inappropriate for a potential commander in chief. Scott Gration, a retired two-star Air Force general who advised the Obama campaign, said in a response that Obama "did not want to see our wounded warriors perceived as a campaign event when his visit was to show his appreciation for our troops and decided instead not to go."

In 2011, Durant gave a speech to the U.S. Army War College, during which he mentioned the opinion that "disarming the population," like what had been done in Somalia, would be "a pretty good step toward law and order" in U.S. cities. The comments re-emerged during Durant's campaign for the U.S. Senate; the campaign of primary opponent Katie Britt charged that Durant's worldview was "not conservative." Durant claimed that media outlets had mischaracterized and taken his statements out of context. In an interview with radio host Phil Williams, Durant stated, "I'm not condoning it. In fact, I'm arguing against it, that it really isn't a smart tactic – certainly not when you're outnumbered like we were there."

=== 2022 U.S. Senate candidacy ===
In September 2021, media speculation arose regarding a possible run for U.S. Senate by Durant. He officially launched a campaign for the office on October 19, 2021, running to replace retiring incumbent senator Richard Shelby in 2022. A late entry to the race, Durant positioned himself as a political outsider and supporter of former president Donald Trump, outlining an "Alabama First" campaign tour. Durant was supported by the More Perfect Union political action committee, which supports the formation of a caucus of centrist senators.

By March 2022, Durant began to lead in polls against the two major opposing candidates in the Republican primary, Shelby's former Chief of Staff Katie Britt and Representative Mo Brooks. Durant's lead expanded after Brooks was un-endorsed by Trump. That same month, In interviews, Durant espoused the false claim that President Joe Biden was "not rightfully elected" in the 2020 presidential election; he said he would not have voted to certify the election results in January 2021, and said he was in favor of removing Biden from office.

In April 2022, the Alabama Republican Party proposed a series of televised debates between Durant, Britt, and Brooks. Durant's campaign did not agree to participate in these debates, and initially declined to comment when asked about them. This drew criticism from Britt, Brooks, and political analysts Quin Hillyer and Steve Flowers. Brooks said that Durant "has the public policy chops of a snail," while Britt said Durant might have "something to hide." Alabama Republican Party chair John Wahl said that the debates were unlikely to occur without Durant. On April 21, 2022, Durant said he was open to debating but had scheduling conflicts. Later, Durant formally declined the proposed dates, scuttling the plans for the debate series.

Durant began to slip in polls around May, weeks before the primary election. He was the subject of negative attack ads that contributed to a rising unfavorable rating among voters in polls. Durant was the subject of speculation that he did not actually live in Alabama, which The New York Times called "a false claim." Durant's views on immigration attracted attention shortly before the primary; he claimed in a radio interview that increased legal immigration was "America First" while also saying that he was "the toughest on illegal immigration." On the night of the primary on May 24, Durant conceded the election after preliminary results showed him in third place behind Britt and Brooks. Some speculated that Durant would endorse Brooks, but in June he officially declined to endorse Brooks or Britt, lambasting the political process and the two remaining candidates. Durant also said that his campaign would be his last foray into politics, blaming his loss on "blatant" untrue attack ads.

== Personal life ==
Durant and his wife, Lisa (also a former Army aviator), reside in Madison, Alabama. They have six children and three grandchildren. Durant's previous marriage to his first wife, Lorrie, ended in divorce; Durant later said that his handling of the media attention he received in the wake of the "Black Hawk Down" incident "probably was a contributing factor" to the divorce.

== Works ==
1. Durant, Michael & Hartov, Steven (2003). In the Company of Heroes. Putnam Pub Group. ISBN 0-399-15060-9.
2. Durant, Michael & Hartov, Steven (2006). The Night Stalkers. Putnam Pub Group. ISBN 0-399-15392-6.

== Awards and decorations ==
Durant's awards include:

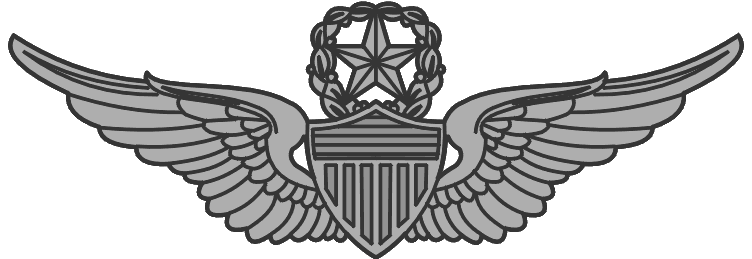

U.S. Army Master Aviator badge
Army Distinguished Service Medal		Distinguished Flying Cross with 2 Oak leaf clusters
Bronze Star with "V" device	Purple Heart	Meritorious Service Medal
Air Medal with 3 Oak leaf clusters	Army Commendation Medal with 2 Oak leaf clusters	Joint Service Achievement Medal
Army Achievement Medal	Prisoner of War Medal	Army Good Conduct Medal
National Defense Service Medal	Armed Forces Expeditionary Medal with 3 Campaign stars	Southwest Asia Service Medal with 1 Campaign star
Army Service Ribbon	Army Overseas Service Ribbon with award numeral 2	United Nations Medal
United Nations Medal Operation in Somalia (UNOSOM II)	Kuwait Liberation Medal (Saudi Arabia)	Kuwait Liberation Medal (Kuwait)
Air Assault Badge
Joint Meritorious Unit Award with 3 Oak leaf clusters		160th SOAR; Distinctive unit insignia
