= Drinkard =

Drinkard may refer to:

== People ==
- Emily Drinkard (1933–2024), known as Cissy Houston, American singer
- Roy Drinkard (1920–2026), American businessman
- William C. Drinkard (1929–2008), American chemist

== Other ==
- Drinkard Sandstone, New Mexico, United States
- The Drinkard Singers, American gospel singing group
