= Ron Bolton (politician) =

American politician

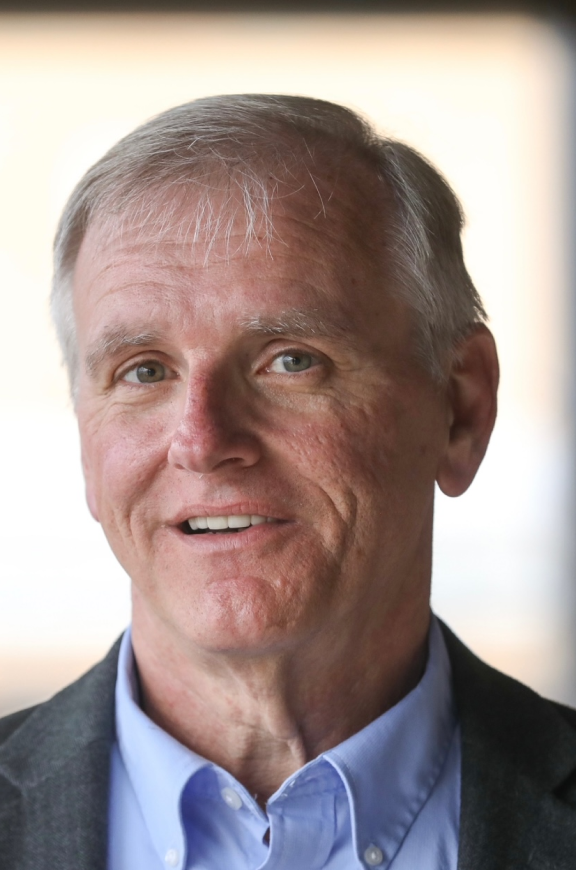

Member of the Alabama House of Representatives from the 61st district
- Incumbent
- Assumed office November 9, 2022
- Preceded by: Rodney Sullivan

Personal details
- Party: Republican
- Spouse: Sharon
- Children: Two
- Education: Associate degree
- Alma mater: University of Alabama, FBI National Academy
- Profession: Business executive

Ron Bolton is an American politician who has been a Republican member of the Alabama House of Representatives since November 8, 2022. He represents Alabama's 61st House district.

== Electoral history ==
He was elected on November 8, 2022, in the 2022 Alabama House of Representatives election against Libertarian opponent Damon Pruet. He assumed office the next day on November 9, 2022.

== Biography ==
Bolton is a retired police officer. He retired in 2011. He used to work at Northport Police Department. He is a Baptist. He graduated from Holt High School, and obtained an Associate degree from Shelton State Community College, and attended University of Alabama.

Alabama House of Representatives
Preceded by Rodney Sullivan	Member of the Alabama House of Representatives; 2022–present	Succeeded by incumbent
