= Falkville, Alabama =

- Town
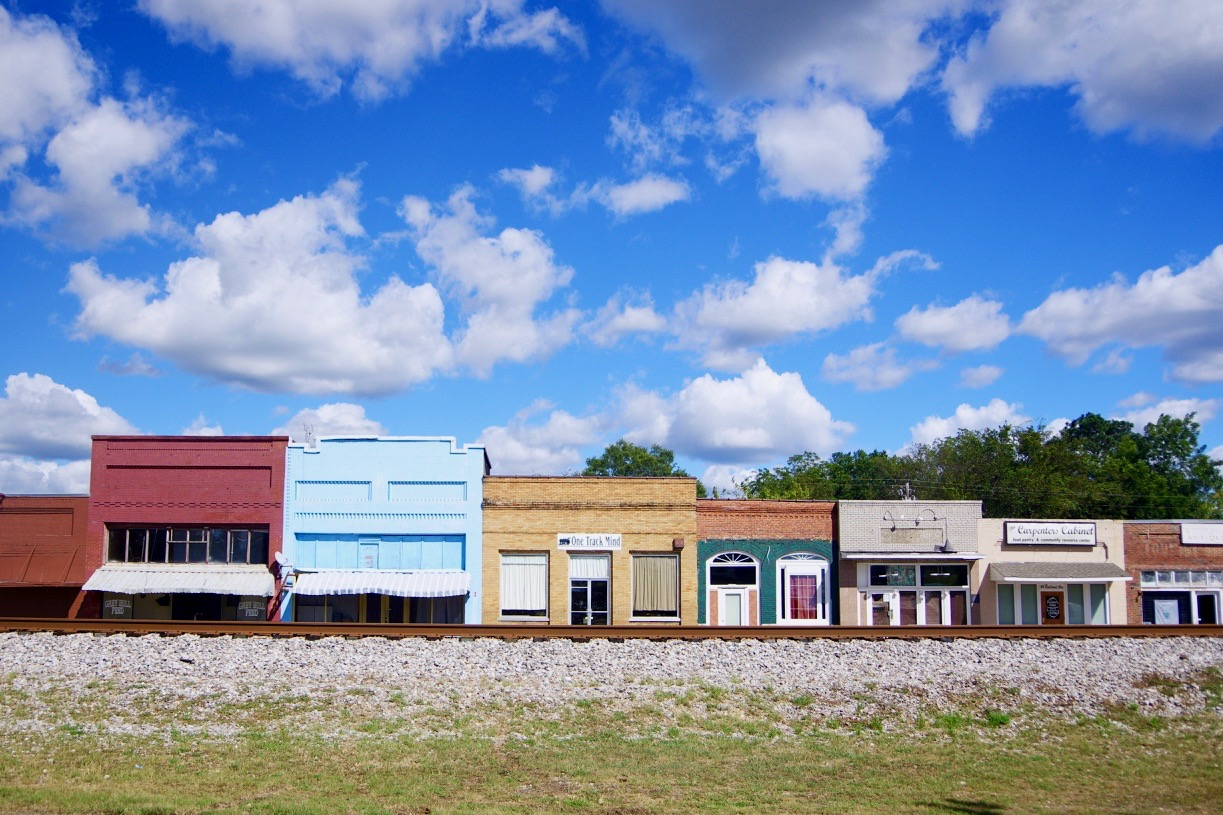
- Railroad Street

- Logo

- Location in Morgan County, Alabama
- Coordinates: 34°22′18″N 86°54′30″W
- Country: United States
- State: Alabama
- County: Morgan

Area
  - Total: 3.80 sq mi (9.83 km^{2})
  - Land: 3.78 sq mi (9.79 km^{2})
  - Water: 0.019 sq mi (0.05 km^{2})
- Elevation: 600 ft (180 m)

Population (2020)
  - Total: 1,197
  - Density: 316.8/sq mi (122.31/km^{2})
- Time zone: UTC-6 (Central (CST))
  - Summer (DST): UTC-5 (CDT)
- ZIP code: 35622
- Area code: 256
- FIPS code: 01-25648
- GNIS feature ID: 2406488
- Website: www.falkville.org

Falkville is a town in Morgan County, Alabama, United States, and is included in the Decatur Metropolitan Area and Huntsville-Decatur Combined Statistical Area. As of the 2020 census, the population of the town was 1,197.

Falkville incorporated three times: first in 1876, again on June 19, 1886, and lastly on December 13, 1898.

== History ==
Falkville was named for Louis M. Falk, a Prussian merchant who emigrated to the area in the late 1850s. Falk opened a general store in what is now Falkville in 1859 and later became the town's first postmaster. The L&N Railroad was constructed through Falkville in the early 1870s, and a rail station opened in 1872.

In 1936, the Works Progress Administration constructed a town hall for Falkville. This building now serves as the town's library.

=== 1950s tornadoes ===
Two destructive tornadoes hit the town in the 1950s. On April 24, 1955, an F4 tornado tore directly through the town, killing five and injuring 20. Two years later, on April 8, 1957, a long-tracked F3 tornado hit the southern part of town. That storm killed two and injured 90.

=== Falkville Metal Man ===
In 1973, Falkville Chief of Police Jeff Greenhaw responded to a call reporting a crashed UFO. Greenhaw claimed to have seen and photographed a mysterious metallic figure with superhuman speed. In 1983 he filed a report that the photographs he took had been stolen from his home. The alleged incident has since become popular among UFOlogists.

== Geography ==
Falkville is located in southern Morgan County. The town is concentrated along U.S. Route 31, 5 miles (8 km) south of Hartselle. Interstate 65 forms the eastern edge of the town, with access from Exit 322. Decatur, the Morgan county seat, is 18 miles (29 km) to the north, Huntsville is 40 miles (64 km) to the northeast, and Cullman is 14 miles (23 km) to the south.

According to the U.S. Census Bureau, the town of Falkville has a total area of 3.8 square miles (9.8 km^{2}), of which 0.02 square miles (0.05 km^{2}), or 0.47%, are water. The town is drained by Robinson Creek and Painter Branch, west-flowing tributaries of Flint Creek, a north-flowing tributary of the Tennessee River.

=== Climate ===
The climate in this area is characterized by hot, humid summers and generally mild to cool winters. According to the Köppen Climate Classification system, Falkville has a humid subtropical climate, abbreviated "Cfa" on climate maps.

== Demographics ==
Historical population
| Census | Pop. | Note | %± |
|---|---|---|---|
| 1880 | 105 | | — |
| 1900 | 343 | | — |
| 1910 | 335 | | −2.3% |
| 1920 | 362 | | 8.1% |
| 1930 | 543 | | 50.0% |
| 1940 | 567 | | 4.4% |
| 1950 | 613 | | 8.1% |
| 1960 | 682 | | 11.3% |
| 1970 | 946 | | 38.7% |
| 1980 | 1,310 | | 38.5% |
| 1990 | 1,337 | | 2.1% |
| 2000 | 1,202 | | −10.1% |
| 2010 | 1,279 | | 6.4% |
| 2020 | 1,197 | | −6.4% |
U.S. Decennial Census; 2013 Estimate

=== Racial and ethnic composition ===
Falkville town, Alabama – Racial and ethnic composition Note: the US Census treats Hispanic/Latino as an ethnic category. This table excludes Latinos from the racial categories and assigns them to a separate category. Hispanics/Latinos may be of any race. Race and ethnicity was not surveyed for populations under 2,500 in the 1980 census and under 1,000 in 1990 census.
| Race / Ethnicity (NH = Non-Hispanic) | Pop 1990 | Pop 2000 | Pop 2010 | Pop 2020 | % 1990 | % 2000 | % 2010 | % 2020 |
|---|---|---|---|---|---|---|---|---|
| White alone (NH) | 1,318 | 1,108 | 1,170 | 1,096 | 98.58% | 92.18% | 91.48% | 91.56% |
| Black or African American alone (NH) | 10 | 71 | 44 | 25 | 0.75% | 5.91% | 3.44% | 2.09% |
| Native American or Alaska Native alone (NH) | 6 | 8 | 14 | 7 | 0.45% | 0.67% | 1.09% | 0.58% |
| Asian alone (NH) | 3 | 0 | 1 | 1 | 0.22% | 0.00% | 0.08% | 0.08% |
| Native Hawaiian or Pacific Islander alone (NH) | x | 0 | 2 | 0 | x | 0.00% | 0.16% | 0.00% |
| Other race alone (NH) | 0 | 0 | 0 | 2 | 0.00% | 0.00% | 0.00% | 0.17% |
| Mixed race or Multiracial (NH) | x | 10 | 20 | 40 | x | 0.83% | 1.56% | 3.34% |
| Hispanic or Latino (any race) | 0 | 5 | 28 | 26 | 0.00% | 0.42% | 2.19% | 2.17% |
| Total | 1,337 | 1,202 | 1,279 | 1,197 | 100.00% | 100.00% | 100.00% | 100.00% |

=== 2020 census ===
As of the 2020 census, Falkville had a population of 1,197. The median age was 52.3 years. 18.2% of residents were under the age of 18 and 35.1% of residents were 65 years of age or older. For every 100 females there were 74.0 males, and for every 100 females age 18 and over there were 70.0 males age 18 and over.

83.7% of residents lived in urban areas, while 16.3% lived in rural areas.

There were 374 households and 260 families in Falkville, of which 31.6% had children under the age of 18 living in them. Of all households, 42.0% were married-couple households, 18.7% were households with a male householder and no spouse or partner present, and 32.1% were households with a female householder and no spouse or partner present. About 30.0% of all households were made up of individuals and 13.6% had someone living alone who was 65 years of age or older.

There were 418 housing units, of which 10.5% were vacant. The homeowner vacancy rate was 2.5% and the rental vacancy rate was 4.7%.

=== 2010 census ===
At the 2010 census there were 1,279 people, 387 households, and 274 families in the town. The population density was 345.7 inhabitants per square mile (133.5/km^{2}). There were 437 housing units at an average density of 118.1 per square mile (46/km^{2}). The racial makeup of the town was 92.1% White, 3.4% Black or African American, 1.1% Native American, 1.3% from other races, and 1.8% from two or more races. 2.2% of the population were Hispanic or Latino of any race. Of the 387 households 29.2% had children under the age of 18 living with them, 49.4% were married couples living together, 16.5% had a female householder with no husband present, and 29.2% were non-families. 25.6% of households were one person and 10.3% were one person aged 65 or older. The average household size was 2.51 and the average family size was 2.98.

The age distribution was 18.5% under the age of 18, 6.6% from 18 to 24, 21.4% from 25 to 44, 21.0% from 45 to 64, and 32.6% 65 or older. The median age was 48.1 years. For every 100 females, there were 68.7 males. For every 100 females age 18 and over, there were 90.9 males.

The median household income was $36,848 and the median family income was $44,150. Males had a median income of $35,450 versus $21,635 for females. The per capita income for the town was $16,850. About 7.9% of families and 11.5% of the population were below the poverty line, including 15.1% of those under age 18 and 24.8% of those age 65 or over.

=== 2000 census ===
At the 2000 census there were 1,202 people, 365 households, and 254 families in the town. The population density was 326.3 inhabitants per square mile (126.0/km^{2}). There were 390 housing units at an average density of 105.9 per square mile (40.9/km^{2}). The racial makeup of the town was 92.26% White, 5.91% Black or African American, 0.67% Native American, 0.08% from other races, and 1.08% from two or more races. 0.42% of the population were Hispanic or Latino of any race. Of the 365 households 27.9% had children under the age of 18 living with them, 55.6% were married couples living together, 10.4% had a female householder with no husband present, and 30.4% were non-families. 26.8% of households were one person and 12.6% were one person aged 65 or older. The average household size was 2.42 and the average family size was 2.94.

The age distribution was 16.6% under the age of 18, 8.7% from 18 to 24, 20.7% from 25 to 44, 21.0% from 45 to 64, and 32.9% 65 or older. The median age was 49 years. For every 100 females, there were 71.5 males. For every 100 females age 18 and over, there were 71.3 males.

The median household income was $34,583 and the median family income was $40,759. Males had a median income of $29,231 versus $23,365 for females. The per capita income for the town was $13,510. About 5.5% of families and 11.6% of the population were below the poverty line, including 7.9% of those under age 18 and 31.7% of those age 65 or over.

== Notable people ==
- Tom Drake, attorney, former professional wrestler and politician
- Roy Drinkard, businessman
- Rodney Jones, poet
