= James Lomax =

American politician

Member of the Alabama House of Representatives from the 20th district
- Incumbent
- Assumed office November 9, 2022
- Preceded by: Howard Sanderford

Personal details
- Born: c. 1992
- Party: Republican
- Spouse: Elizabeth
- Children: 2
- Education: Master's degree, Undergraduate degree

James Lomax is an American politician who has served as a Republican member of the Alabama House of Representatives since November 8, 2022. He represents Alabama's 20th House district.

== Biography ==
Lomax graduated from Grissom High School. Lomax graduated from Lipscomb University with a Master's degree in 2017 and completed his undergraduate degree at the University of Alabama in Huntsville in 2013. He lives in Huntsville and is a Baptist.

== Electoral history ==
Lomax first entered politics when he ran for Huntsville city council district 3 in 2010 at age 18. He lost the election, placing 5th out of 8 candidates.

He was elected unopposed on November 8, 2022, in the 2022 Alabama House of Representatives election. He assumed office the next day on November 9, 2022.

Alabama House of Representatives
Preceded by Howard Sanderford	Member of the Alabama House of Representatives; 2022–present	Succeeded by incumbent
