= Howard Sanderford =

American politician (1935–2026)

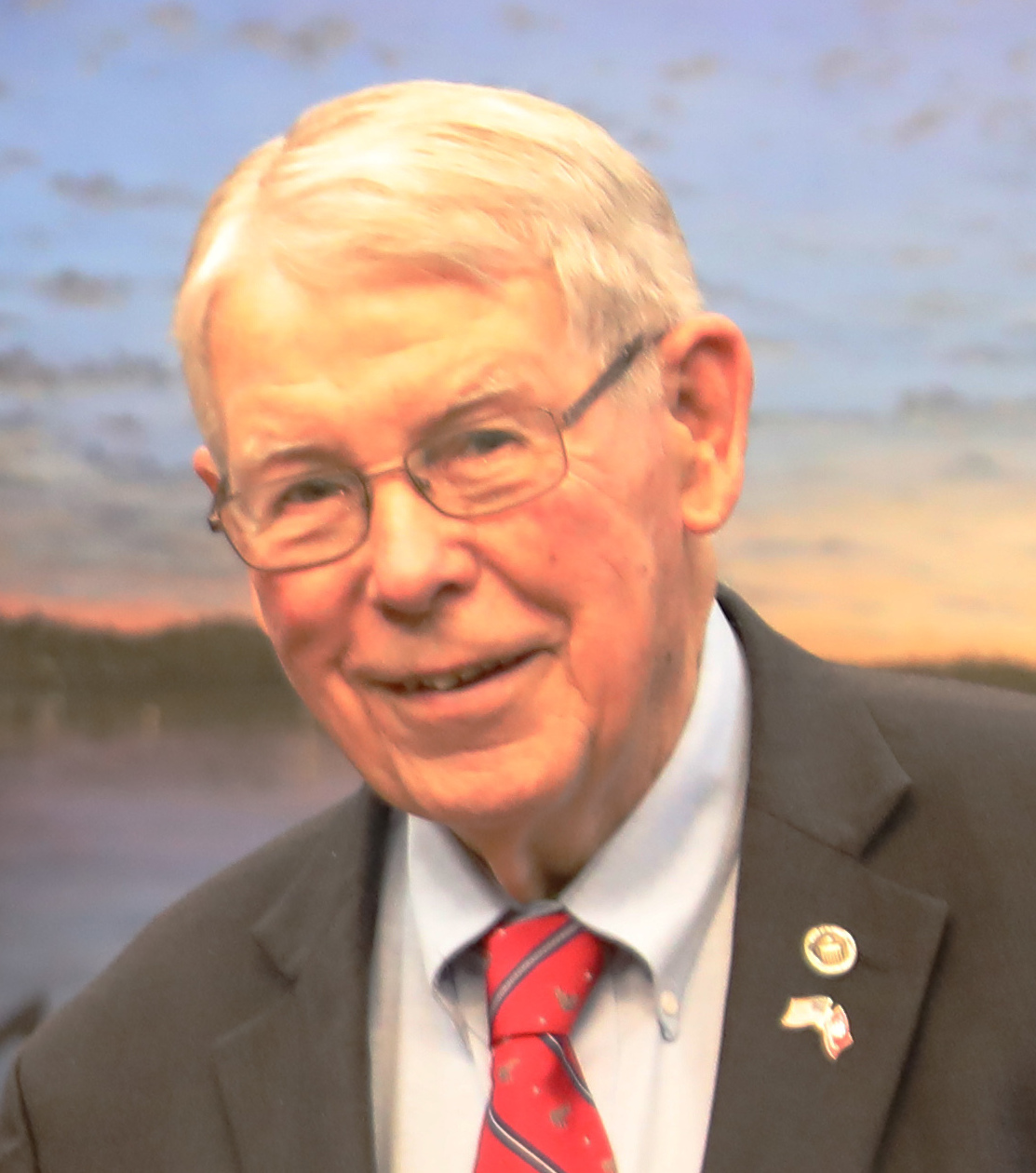
- Sanderford in 2022

Member of the Alabama House of Representatives from the 20th district
- In office January 10, 1989 – November 9, 2022
- Preceded by: Steve Hettinger
- Succeeded by: James Lomax

Personal details
- Born: October 18, 1935 Meridian, Mississippi, U.S.
- Died: January 7, 2026 (aged 90)
- Party: Republican
- Spouse: Dot Sanderford
- Education: Mississippi State University
- Profession: Businessman
- Website: Representative Howard Sanderford

James Howard Sanderford (October 18, 1935 – January 7, 2026) was an American politician who was a member of the Alabama State House of Representatives. Sanderford, a Republican, represented the 20th district from 1989 to 2022. The district composes most of southeast Huntsville.

== Background ==
Sanderford received his B.S. Degree in Accounting from Mississippi State University where he was active with student government. After serving as an officer in the U.S. Marine Corps, Howard Sanderford became an executive with IBM and is now President of Computer Leasing Company, Inc. He and his wife Dot are active in their church, First Baptist Church of Huntsville.

He served as President of the Huntsville Rotary Club, Chairman of the Madison County Republican Executive Committee, co-chairman of the Chamber of Commerce Free Enterprise Committee, Vice President of the Metropolitan YMCA Board, and was a member of the Alabama Commission on Aerospace Sciences and the Alabama Management Improvement Program.

Sanderford was later a board member of the Alabama Space and Rocket Center, Volunteers of America of North Alabama, YMCA, Alabama Men's Hall of Fame, and Alabama Board of Medical Scholarship Awards.

Sanderford died on January 7, 2026, at the age of 90.

== 2010 election ==
Sanderford received primary opposition by two political newcomers in his bid for a seventh term in the Alabama legislature – David Pinkleton, a 23-year-old University of Alabama in Huntsville (UAH) student and former Republican Women of Huntsville President Frances Taylor. Both Pinkleton and Taylor focused their campaigns on individual property rights in response to the Huntsville Housing Authority's move into south Huntsville. Sanderford won the June 1 primary with 57% or 5724 votes and avoided a runoff.

== Committee assignments ==
Sanderford served on the Boards, Agencies & Commissions Committee (chair), Judiciary Committee (Vice-chair), Madison County Legislation, Sunset Committee (Co-chair), Joint Legislative State Parks Committee, and Joint Legislative Medal of Honor Committee (chair). He also served on the Southern Legislative Committee (executive committee) and the Energy Council.

== Sources ==
- https://web.archive.org/web/20100316213034/http://www.legislature.state.al.us/house/representatives/housebios/hd020.html
