= Tom Drake (wrestler) =

American politician and lawyer

62nd Speaker of the Alabama House of Representatives
- In office 1983–1987
- Preceded by: Joseph C. McCorquodale
- Succeeded by: James S. Clark

Member of the Alabama House of Representatives

Personal details
- Born: Thomas Edwin Drake; December 5, 1930 Falkville, Alabama, U.S.
- Died: February 2, 2017 (aged 86) Cullman, Alabama, U.S.
- Party: Democratic
- Spouse: Christine Mckoy Drake
- Education: University of Alabama; University of Tennessee
- Nickname: Cullman Comet

Thomas Edwin Drake (December 5, 1930 – February 2, 2017) was an American attorney, professional wrestler, politician, and member of the athletic staff of legendary football coach Paul "Bear" Bryant. He was a Democratic member of the Alabama House of Representatives, serving nine terms, and as Speaker from 1983 to 1987. He was a resident of Vinemont, Alabama; his wife of over 55 years, Christine Mckoy Drake – also an attorney, stateswoman and former member of the Alabama Board of Education – predeceased him on September 26, 2011, following a long battle with brain cancer.

== Early life ==
Drake was born in Falkville, Alabama. Raised in the Great Depression after his father died when Drake was only six years old, he attended public schools in Cullman County. Obtaining an athletic scholarship to the University of Tennessee at Chattanooga after high school, he both wrestled and played football for the Chattanooga "Mocs".

He was subsequently drafted by the Pittsburgh Steelers, but his career with them ended when he was drafted by the United States Army. After an honorable discharge, he went on to become the first head wrestling coach at the University of Alabama and was a member of the athletic staff, which included Head Coach "Bear" Bryant and future coach Gene Stallings.

== Career ==
=== Wrestling ===
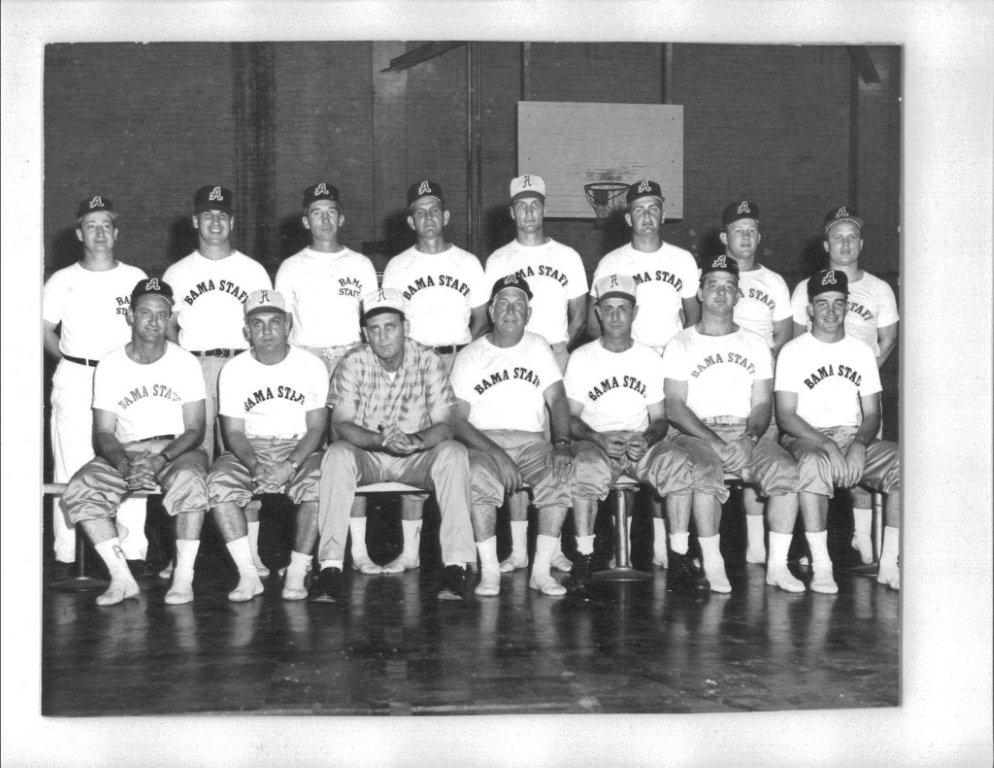
Paul "Bear" Bryant and his athletic staff at the University of Alabama. Head wrestling coach Tom Drake is pictured back row, second from right.

Pivotal in his success was the acclaim and notoriety he achieved as a wrestler. Along the way, Drake wrestled or partnered with many of the sport's greatest legends, including Gorgeous George, Lou Thesz, Bearcat Brown, Tojo Yamamoto and Len Rossi. Sometimes wrestling as the "Cullman Comet", Drake wrestled professionally until 1978, eventually being inducted into the International Wrestlers Hall of Fame in 2001. His signature wrestling move was the "dropkick".

Invited to be a contestant on the popular 1970s game show What's My Line?, the celebrity panel was challenged to guess Drake's "other" occupation, after being informed he was both an attorney, farmer and legislator. Eventually, they correctly guessed it was professional wrestling.

In 2008, he was the recipient of the Senator Hugh Farley Award at the Professional Wrestling Hall of Fame and Museum. Drake resided in Vinemont, Alabama.

=== Law and politics ===
In 1960, Drake entered law school at the University of Alabama. He continued to wrestle in order to support Chris and daughter Mary. While still a student, he successfully campaigned for a seat in the Alabama Legislature, defeating 11 opponents without a run-off. In that position, he represented Cullman County for 32 years. While a member of the House of Representatives, he was elected to consecutive terms as the Speaker of the House under then-Governor George Wallace.

Coming from a long line of lawyers on his mother's side of the family, Drake practiced personal injury law and general civil law for over 48 years, handling many high-profile cases in the North Alabama area. His grandfather, Jasper Newton "Butler" Powell, an attorney as well, was sought out for assistance in jury selection by both the prosecution and defense in the infamous Scottsboro Boys trial. Two of Drake's children are lawyers and continue to practice law in North and Central Alabama.

== Death ==
Drake died on February 2, 2017. He was 86.

== Championships and accomplishments ==
- Cauliflower Alley Club
  - Iron Mike Mazurki Award (1997)
- George Tragos/Lou Thesz Professional Wrestling Hall of Fame
  - Class of 2001
- Professional Wrestling Hall of Fame and Museum
  - Senator Hugh Farley Award (2008)
  - Significant Sig Award (2016)
