= Rodney Sullivan =

American politician from Alabama

Member of the Alabama House of Representatives from the 61st district
- In office November 7, 2018 – November 9, 2022
- Succeeded by: Ron Bolton

Personal details
- Party: Republican
- Occupation: Politician

Rodney Sullivan is an American politician in Alabama. Sullivan was a member of the Alabama House of Representatives representing the 61st district.

== Electoral history ==
Rodney was elected to the house in the 2018 Alabama House of Representatives election against Democratic opponent Tommy Hyche. He did not seek reelection in 2020.
