= Roy Drinkard =

American businessman (1920–2026)

Roy Henry Drinkard (July 12, 1920 – August 23, 2026) was an American businessman who owned numerous properties and shopping centers throughout the Southeastern United States. He resided in Cullman, Alabama, where he served as president and CEO of Drinkard Development, Inc., a company which provides management, leasing and maintenance services for commercial properties. He was named 2007 City Family Patriarch by the Cullman County Farm-City Committee.

== Early life and career ==
Drinkard's father was also a businessman, serving as the mayor of Falkville for 20 years. Drinkard had five siblings, three brothers and two sisters. He attended St. Bernard Preparatory School in Cullman.

Drinkard served honorably in the US Marine Corps during World War II as a Private First Class. For a time, Drinkard ran a funeral home in Guntersville. In 1949, Drinkard returned to Cullman, becoming an automobile dealer. Drinkard was a member of the “Flying 50,” a group of local Cullman leaders who traveled across the country recruiting businesses and industries to the area. Drinkard's work improving Cullman's economy led to him being named The Cullman Times Distinguished Citizen of the Century. In April 2000, Roy H. Drinkard was appointed a trustee of Troy University in Troy, Alabama by then Alabama Governor Don Siegelman.

Many of the buildings owned by Drinkard are designed in German village-inspired themes, reflecting the German heritage and history of Cullman County, Alabama.

He recited the Pledge of Allegiance ahead of Donald Trump's August 21, 2021, rally in Cullman.

== Personal life and death ==
Drinkard was a long-time resident of the Borkenau, one of Cullman's most historic houses. The Borkenau was constructed in 1909 by Austrian-born Cullman resident Ignatius Pollak. Drinkard bought the Borkenau when he moved to Cullman in 1949.

Drinkard died on August 23, 2026, at the age of 106.
