= Steve Flowers =

American politician

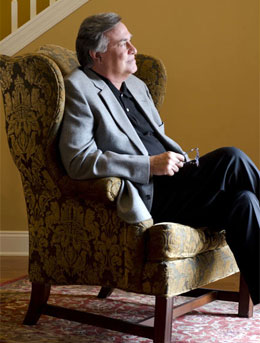
Author Steve Flowers

Steve Flowers is a political columnist, commentator, and historian. Flowers writes a weekly syndicated column, Inside the Statehouse, which is published in newspapers across the state of Alabama. Flowers is also the author of Of Goats and Governors: Six Decades of Colorful Alabama Political Stories, which was published by New South Books in 2015.

== Early life and education ==
Flowers is a native of Troy, Alabama. Beginning at age 12, Flowers served as a page in the Alabama House of Representatives. After graduating from high school, Flowers attended the University of Alabama. As a university student, Flowers took part in the Student Government Association, where he served in the Student Senate. In 1974, Flowers received a degree in political science and history from the University of Alabama.

== Alabama House of Representatives (1982–1998) ==
At age 30, Flowers was elected to the Alabama House of Representatives by the people of Pike County. Flowers was re-elected four times, leaving the legislature in 1998. During his time in the Senate, Flowers was voted by his colleagues as the most outstanding member of the House of Representatives in 1992.

== "Inside the Statehouse" ==
In 2002, Flowers began writing a weekly column on Alabama politics, Inside the Statehouse which appears in newspapers across the state.

== Political commentary ==
Flowers has appeared on various television stations in Alabama, analyzing recent events in state politics. In addition, Flowers has also provided political analysis for national news outlets, including CBS, ABC, PBS, MSNBC, and the BBC. Flowers has also appeared on Alabama Public Radio, and hosts a thirty-minute television show, Alabama Politics with Steve Flowers, which airs in the Montgomery viewing area. Those who have appeared on Alabama Politics include former U.S. senator Richard Shelby, former governor Robert Bentley, former U.S. senator Luther Strange, and state treasurer Young Boozer.

Flowers has also appeared on several local news outlets, including:

- Alabama News Network - WAKA and WNCF (Montgomery)
- WIAT 42 News (Birmingham)
- Fox 10 News (Mobile)
- WTVY Channel 4 News (Dothan)

== Publications ==
In 2015, Flowers published his first book, entitled Of Goats and Governors: Six Decades of Colorful Alabama Political Stories. The book covers Alabama's political history. In 2025, Flowers will release his second book Jabo Waggoner: An Alabama Political Legend which will tell the story of Alabama State politician Jabo Waggoner and is expected no later than September 30, 2024.
