= Mikoyan-Gurevich MiG-15 =

Soviet fighter aircraft

MiG-15
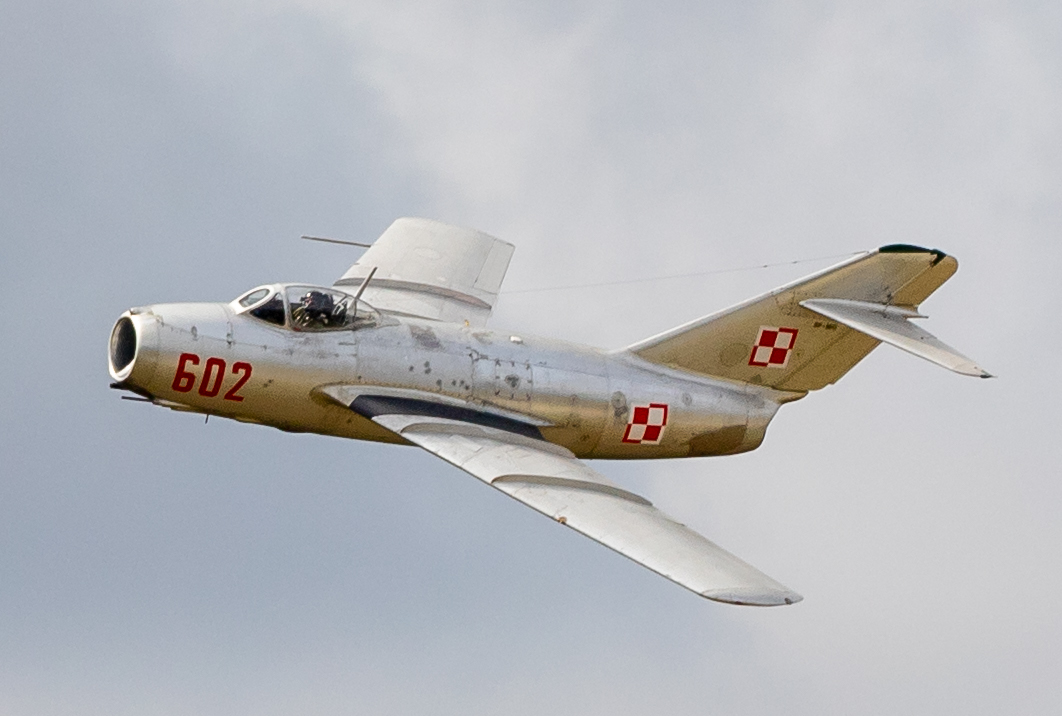
- PZL Mielec Lim-2, Polish variant of the MiG-15bis

General information
- Type: Fighter aircraft
- National origin: Soviet Union
- Manufacturer: Mikoyan-Gurevich
- Status: In limited service with the Korean People's Army Air Force
- Primary users: Soviet Air Forces (historical): People's Liberation Army Air Force (historical); Korean People's Army Air Force
- Number built: 13,130 in the USSR + at least 4,180 under license

History
- Introduction date: 1949
- First flight: 30 December 1947
- Developed into: Mikoyan-Gurevich MiG-17

The Mikoyan-Gurevich MiG-15 (Russian: Микоян-Гуревич МиГ-15; USAF/DoD designation: Type 14; NATO reporting name: Fagot) is a single-seat transonic jet fighter aircraft developed by Mikoyan-Gurevich for the Soviet Union. The MiG-15 was one of the first successful jet fighters to incorporate swept wings to perform near Mach 1. In aerial combat during the Korean War, it outclassed straight-winged jet-powered day fighters, which were largely relegated to ground-attack roles. In response to the MiG-15's appearance and in order to counter it, the United States Air Force rushed the North American F-86 Sabre to Korea.

When refined into the more advanced MiG-17, the basic design would again surprise the West when it proved effective against supersonic fighters such as the Republic F-105 Thunderchief and McDonnell Douglas F-4 Phantom II in the Vietnam War of the 1960s.

The MiG-15 is believed to have been one of the most produced jet aircraft with more than 13,000 manufactured. The MiG-15 remains in service with the Korean People's Army Air Force as an advanced trainer.

== Design and development ==
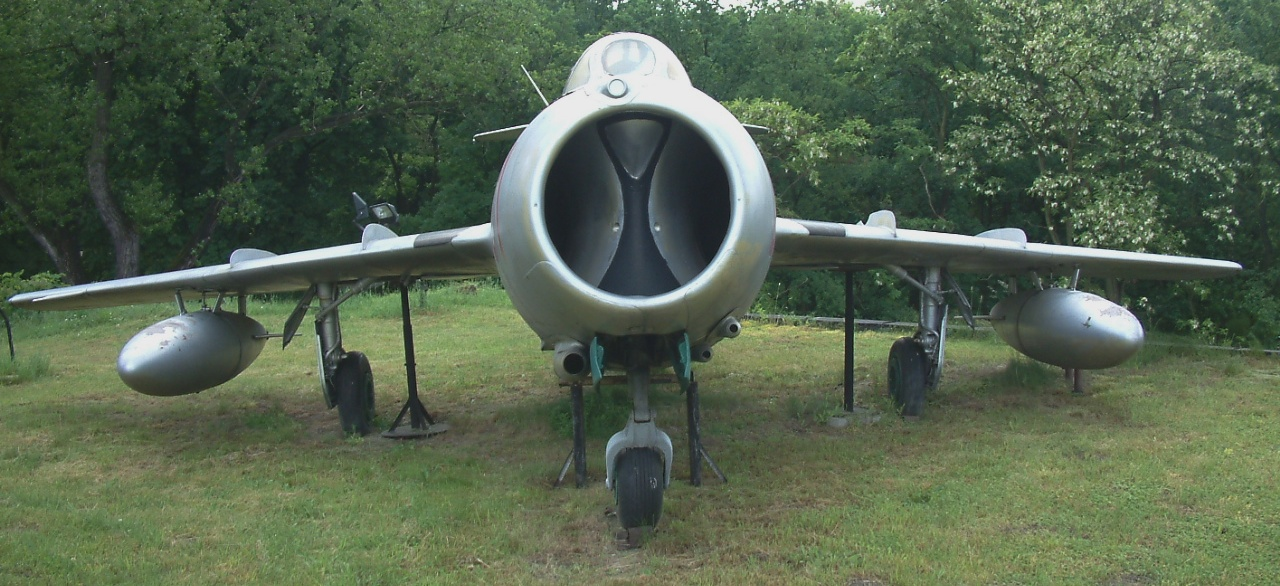
Front view of a MiG-15

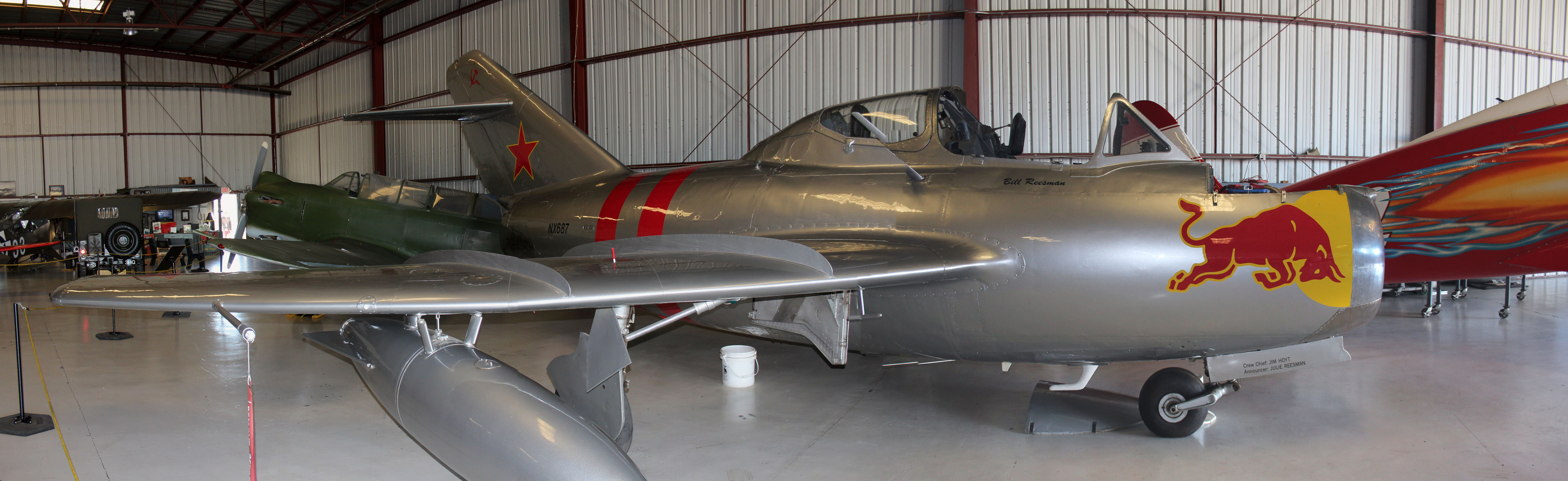
MiG-15UTI Trainer version, Chino Planes of Fame Air Museum

The first turbojet fighter developed by Mikoyan-Gurevich OKB was the Mikoyan-Gurevich MiG-9, which appeared in the years immediately after World War II. It used a pair of reverse-engineered German BMW 003 engines. The MiG-9 was a troublesome design that suffered from weak, unreliable engines and control problems. Categorized as a first-generation jet fighter, it was designed with the straight-style wings common to piston-engined fighters.

In 1946 Soviet engine technology was far behind the West's. The Germans had been unable to develop airworthy turbojets with thrust over 1,130 kilograms-force (11,100 N; 2,500 lbf) capable of running for more than a few hours at the time of the surrender in May 1945, which limited the performance of immediate Soviet postwar jet aircraft designs. The Soviet aviation minister Mikhail Khrunichev and aircraft designer A. S. Yakovlev suggested to Premier Joseph Stalin that the USSR buy the reliable, fully developed, Rolls-Royce Nene (having been alerted to the fact that the UK Labour government wanted to improve post-war UK-Russia foreign relations) for the purpose of copying them in a minimum of time. Stalin is said to have replied, "What fool will sell us his secrets?"

However, he gave his consent to the proposal and Mikoyan, engine designer Vladimir Yakovlevich Klimov, and others travelled to the United Kingdom to request the engines. To Stalin's amazement, the British Labour government and its Minister of Trade, Sir Stafford Cripps, were perfectly willing to provide technical information and a license to manufacture the Rolls-Royce Nene. Sample engines were purchased and delivered with blueprints. Following evaluation and adaptation to Russian conditions, the windfall technology was tooled for mass-production as the Klimov RD-45 to be incorporated into the MiG-15.

To take advantage of the new engine, the Council of Ministers ordered the Mikoyan-Gurevich OKB to build two prototypes for an advanced high-altitude daytime interceptor to defend against bombers. It was to have a top speed of 1,000 kilometres per hour (620 mph) and a range of 1,200 kilometres (750 mi).

Designers at MiG's OKB-155 started with the earlier MiG-9 jet fighter. The new fighter used Klimov's British-derived engines, swept wings, and a tailpipe going all the way back to a swept tail. The German Me 262 was the first fighter fitted with an 18.5° wing sweep, but it was introduced merely to adjust the center of gravity of its heavy Junkers Jumo 004 pioneering axial-compressor turbojet engines. Further experience and research during World War II later established that swept wings would give better performance at transonic speeds. At the end of World War II, the Soviets seized many of the assets of Germany's aircraft industry. The MiG team studied these plans, prototypes and documents, particularly swept-wing research and designs, even going so far as to produce a flying testbed in 1945 to investigate swept-wing design concepts as the piston-engined "pusher"-layout, MiG-8 Utka (Russian for "duck", from its tail-first canard design). The swept wing later proved to have a decisive performance advantage over straight-winged jet fighters when it was introduced into combat over Korea.

The design that emerged had a mid-mounted 35° swept wing with a slight anhedral and a tailplane mounted up on the swept tail. Western analysts noted that it strongly resembled Kurt Tank's Focke-Wulf Ta 183, a later design than the Me 262 that never progressed beyond the design stage. While the majority of Focke-Wulf engineers (in particular, Hans Multhopp, who led the Ta 183 development team) were captured by Western armies, the Soviets did capture plans and wind-tunnel models for the Ta 183. The MiG-15 does bear a resemblance in layout, sharing the high tailplane and nose-mounted intake, although the aircraft are different in structure, details, and proportions. The MiG-15's design understandably shared features and some appearance commonalities with the MiG design bureau's own 1945–46 attempt at a Soviet-built version of the Messerschmitt Me 263 rocket fighter in the appearance of its fuselage. The new MiG retained the previous straight-winged MiG-9's wing and tailplane placement while the F-86 employed a more conventional low-winged design. To prevent confusion during the height of combat the US painted their aircraft with bright stripes to distinguish them.

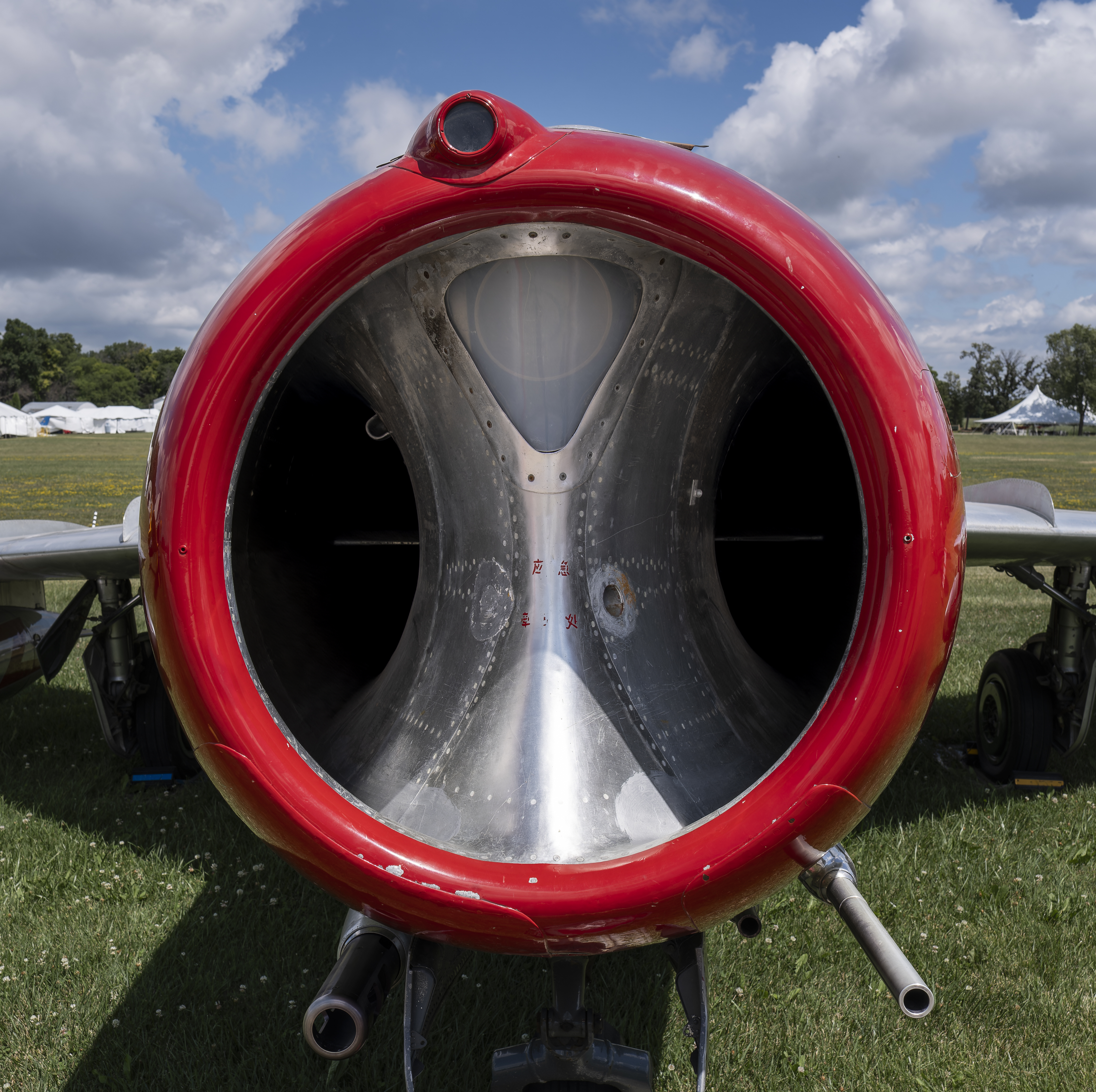
Split forward air intake

The resulting prototypes were designated I-310. The I-310 was a swept-wing fighter with 35° sweep in wings and tail, with two wing fences fitted to each wing to improve airflow over the wing. The design used a single Rolls-Royce Nene fed by a split-forward air intake. A duct carried intake air around the cockpit area and back together ahead of the engine. Its first flight was 30 December 1947, some two months after the American F-86 Sabre had first flown. It demonstrated exceptional performance, reaching 1,042 kilometres per hour (647 mph) at 3,000 metres (9,800 ft).

The Soviet Union's first swept-wing jet fighter had been the underpowered Lavochkin La-160, which was otherwise more similar to the MiG-9. The Lavochkin La-168, which reached production as the Lavochkin La-15, used the same engine as the MiG but used a shoulder-mounted wing and t-tail; it was the main competitive design. Eventually, the MiG design was favoured for mass production. Designated MiG-15, the first production example flew on 31 December 1948. It entered Soviet Air Force service in 1949 and subsequently received the NATO reporting name "Fagot". Early production examples had a tendency to roll to the left or to the right due to manufacturing variances, so aerodynamic trimmers called nozhi (knives) were fitted to correct the problem, the knives being adjusted by ground crews until the aircraft flew correctly.

The MiG-15 was originally intended to intercept American bombers like the B-29. It was even evaluated in mock air-to-air combat trials with a captured US B-29, as well as the later Soviet B-29 copy, the Tupolev Tu-4. To ensure the destruction of such large bombers, the MiG-15 carried autocannons: two 23 mm (0.91 in) with 80 rounds per gun and a single 37 mm (1.46 in) with 40 rounds. These weapons provided tremendous punch in the interceptor role, but their limited rate of fire and relatively low velocity made it more difficult to score hits against small and manoeuvrable enemy jet fighters in air-to-air combat. The 23 mm and 37 mm also had radically different ballistics, and some United Nations (UN) pilots in Korea had the unnerving experience of 23 mm shells passing over them while the 37 mm shells flew under. The cannon were fitted into a simple pack that could be winched out of the bottom of the nose for servicing and reloading, allowing pre-prepared packs to be rapidly swapped out. Despite the shortcomings of its armament, the MiG-15's simplicity, ruggedness, and particularly the absence of fuel tanks in its wings made it a formidable air-to-air adversary; its airframe has relatively few vulnerable areas, and shooting one down using the relatively fast-firing but less potent M2 Browning machine guns common in American aircraft almost invariably required multiple hits.

An improved variant, the MiG-15bis ("second"), entered service in early 1950 with a Klimov VK-1 engine, another version of the Nene with improved metallurgy over the RD-45, plus minor improvements and upgrades. Visible differences were a headlight in the air intake separator and horizontal upper edge airbrakes. The 23 mm cannon were placed more closely together in their undercarriage. Some "bis" aircraft also adopted under-wing hardpoints for unguided rocket launchers or 50–250 kg (110–550 lb) bombs. Fighter-bomber modifications were dubbed "IB", "SD-21", and "SD-5". About 150 aircraft were upgraded to SD-21 specification during 1953–1954.

The MiG-15 arguably had sufficient power to dive at supersonic speeds, but the lack of an "all-flying" tail greatly diminished the pilot's ability to control the aircraft as it approached Mach 1. As a result, pilots had to take care not to exceed Mach 0.92, where the flight control surfaces became ineffective. The instrument panel had a red warning light that would illuminate when this speed was reached, and during post-Korean War flight tests, American test pilots found that the aircraft would buffet heavily above Mach 0.92 and would pitch up at Mach 0.95. During a high-altitude, full-power dive to determine if the MiG-15 could exceed Mach 1, Chuck Yeager reached Mach 0.98, but the MiG would go no faster, and he lost roll control and did not begin to regain it until flying into denser air at 12,000 ft (3,700 m) of altitude; he had descended to 3,000 ft (910 m) by the time he fully regained control and recovered from the dive.

The MiG-15 tended to spin after it stalled, and often the pilot could not recover. According to American test pilots, this behavior was exacerbated by the lack of a noticeable stall warning. The MiG's proclivity towards sudden spins was deduced by UN pilots before the US was able to test one; during the Korean War, there were 56 recorded instances of UN pilots witnessing a MiG-15 entering a spin in combat, resulting in at least 25 crashes and ten ejections.

== Operational history ==
=== Chinese Civil War ===
The large-scale introduction of the MiG-15 occurred during the last phases of the Chinese Civil War. During the first months of 1950, aircraft of the Nationalist ROCAF, operating from bases in Taiwan, attacked mainland China, including Shanghai. Mao Zedong requested assistance with air defense from the USSR.

In February 1950, the 50th Fighter Aviation Division (50 IAD) of the Soviet Air Defence Forces, equipped with the MiG-15bis, was deployed to southern China, to support the People's Liberation Army Air Force (PLAAF) and begin training Chinese pilots in the MiG-15. In April 1950, MiG-15s flown by Soviet pilots began operating over Shanghai, thwarting the Nationalist bombing campaign. On 28 April 1950, a Captain Kalinikov shot down a ROCAF P-38, in the first aerial victory for a MiG-15 pilot. Another followed on 11 May, when Captain Ilya Ivanovich Schinkarenko downed a B-24 Liberator flown by Li Chao Hua, commander of the 8th Air Group, ROCAF.

=== Soviet MiG-15s in the Korean War ===
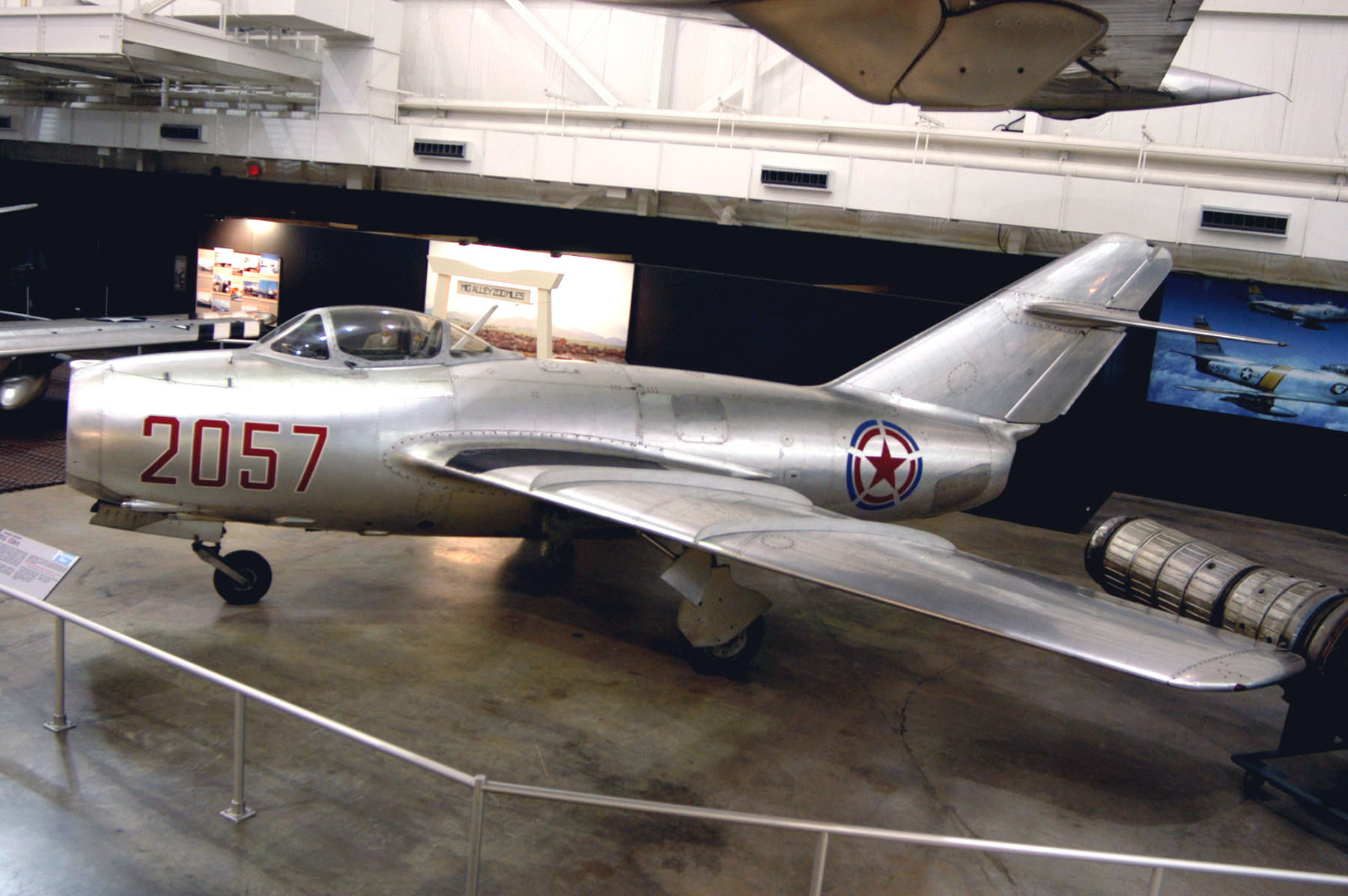
No Kum-sok's MiG-15bis on display at the National Museum of the United States Air Force

==== Overview and background ====
For many years, the Soviet Union actively denied that its pilots flew in Korea during the Korean War; only China and North Korea took responsibility for Korean War operations. After the end of the Cold War, Soviet pilots who participated in the conflict began to reveal their roles. Books by Chinese, Russian and ex-Soviet authors, such as Zhang Xiaoming, Leonid Krylov, Yuriy Tepsurkaev and Igor Seydov revealed details of the actual pilots and operations. From the beginning, Soviet pilots were ordered to avoid flying over areas in which they might be captured. Soviet aircraft were adorned with North Korean or Chinese markings and even the pilots inside the aircraft wore either North Korean uniforms or civilian clothes to disguise their nationality. For radio communication, they were given cards with common Korean words for various flying terms spelled out phonetically in Cyrillic letters. These subterfuges did not long survive the stresses of air-to-air combat, however. Pilots often inadvertently reverted to their native language. UN forces widely suspected the participation of Soviet aircrews, and intercepted radio traffic appeared to include combat pilots speaking Russian. In addition, USAF pilots claimed to have recognized techniques and tactics used by Soviet pilots, whom they referred to as "honchos".

When the Korean War broke out on 25 June 1950, the North Korean People's Air Force (KPAF) was equipped with World War II-vintage Soviet propeller-driven fighters, including 93 Il-10s and 79 Yak-9Ps, and "40–50 assorted transport/liaison/trainer aircraft". Propeller-driven, single-engine fighters were also numerically dominant amongst the air forces that would come under United Nations Command (UNC) – such as the North American P-51 Mustang, Vought F4U Corsair and Hawker Sea Fury. Initially, the numerical and technical superiority of UNC fighter units gave them air supremacy, and laid North Korean targets bare to the destructive power of United States Air Force (USAF) Boeing B-29 heavy bombers.

During 1950, the Kremlin agreed to supply China and North Korea with MiG-15s, as well as train their pilots. The 50th Fighter Aviation Division (50 IAD), equipped with the MiG-15, was already based near Shanghai, as it had taken part in the Chinese Civil War (see previous section). A detachment from the 50 IAD was moved to Antung, next to the border with North Korea in August 1950. They formed the 29th Guards Fighter Regiment (29 GvIAP). When China entered the war in support of North Korea, the Soviets agreed to provide 16 operational air regiments of MiG-15s, including combat pilots. In the meantime, more MiG-15 pilots were recruited; the squadrons earmarked for Korea were drawn from elite units. The pilots had to be younger than 27, and priority was given to World War II veterans. The first large Soviet aviation unit sent to Korea, the 324th IAD, was an air defense interceptor division commanded by Colonel Ivan Kozhedub, who, with 62 victories, was the top Soviet (and Allied) ace of World War II. In November 1950, the 151st and 28th IADs plus the veteran 50th IAD were reorganized into the 64th Fighter Aviation Corps (64 IAK).

Map showing the general location of "MiG Alley"

Initially, the Soviet fighters operated close to their bases, limited by the range of their aircraft, and were guided to the air battlefield by good ground control, which directed them to the most advantageous positions. For political, security and logistical reasons, they were not allowed to cross an imaginary line drawn from Wonsan to Pyongyang, and never to fly over the sea. The MiG-15s always operated in pairs, with an attacking leader covered by a wingman. The northwestern portion of North Korea where the Yalu River empties into the Yellow Sea was dubbed "MiG Alley" and became the site of numerous dogfights.

MiG-15 pilots also proved very effective in the specific role for which the type was originally designed: intercepting formations of B-29s. At the tactical level, large formations of MiGs would wait on the Chinese side of the border. When UN aircraft entered MiG Alley, the MiGs would swoop down from high altitude to attack. If they ran into trouble, they would try to escape back over the border into China. Soviet MiG-15 squadrons operated in big groups, but the basic formation was a six-aircraft group, divided into three pairs, each composed of a leader and a wingman:

- The first pair of MiG-15s attacked the enemy Sabres.
- The second pair protected the first pair.
- The third pair remained above, supporting the two other pairs when needed. This pair had more freedom and could also attack targets of opportunity, such as lone Sabres that had lost their wingmen.

After the MiG-15 entered the war, it was shown to be clearly superior to the best straight-wing jets operated by other countries, including the Gloster Meteor, Lockheed F-80, Republic F-84 and Grumman F9F. In most measures of performance, the North American F-86 Sabre – which was also a swept-wing design – was the only close contemporary that could match the MiG-15.

The USAF has claimed that the F-86 had the advantage in combat kills over Korea between 1950 and 1953. It has been acknowledged that many individual Soviet pilots had larger individual tallies than their UN counterparts, due to a number of factors, although the aggregated claims made by Soviet pilots were probably overstated.

According to Soviet/Russian sources, 335 Soviet-piloted MiG-15s were lost in Korea to all causes, including accidents, AA fire and ground attacks. Chinese sources claim that 224 Chinese-piloted MiG-15s were lost over Korea. North Korean losses are not known, but according to North Korean defectors, their air force lost around 100 MiG-15s during the war. Thus, around 659 MiG-15s are admitted as being lost. While an overwhelming majority of the losses to UN fighters involved F-86 pilots, several MiG-15s were lost in, or immediately after, combat with each of several other UN fighters: F-80s, F-84s, F9Fs, Gloster Meteors and even propeller-driven F4Us and Sea Furies.

The Soviet 64th Fighter Aviation Corps (64 IAK), which controlled all Soviet-piloted aircraft in the Korean War, claimed 1,106 aircraft shot down by MiG-15s. The records of USAF units confirm 139 US aircraft were shot down by MiGs, with another 68 lost due to unknown causes, 237 aircraft listed as missing due to unknown causes, and 472 aircraft classified as "other losses". Data-matching with Soviet records suggests that US pilots routinely attributed their own combat losses to "landing accidents" and "other losses".

==== November 1950 to January 1952 ====
On 1 November 1950, the 50th IAD joined the war with its MiG-15s – their noses painted red and in North Korean markings. That day, eight MiG-15s intercepted about 15 USAF F-51D Mustangs, and First Lieutenant Fyodor V. Chizh shot down Aaron Abercombrie, killing the American pilot. The first-ever jet-versus-jet combat occurred that same day when three MiG-15s from the 50th IAD intercepted ten F-80 Shooting Stars. The F-80C piloted by 1st Lt Frank Van Sickle USAF was shot down by 1st Lt Semyon Fyodorovich Khominich, and Van Sickle was killed. However, the USAF falsely attributed the loss to North Korean AA artillery.

However, on 9 November, the Soviet MiG-15 pilots suffered their first loss when Lieutenant Commander William T. Amen off the aircraft carrier USS Philippine Sea shot down and killed Captain Mikhail F. Grachev while flying a Grumman F9F Panther.

To counter the MiG-15, three squadrons of the F-86 Sabre, America's only operational jet with swept wings, were quickly rushed to Korea in December. On 17 December, Lt Col. Bruce H. Hinton forced Maj. Yakov Nikanorovich Yefromeyenko to eject from his burning MiG. Five days later, Capt. Nikolay Yefremovich Vorobyov shot down the F-86A of Captain Lawrence V. Bach in his MiG-15bis. Both sides exaggerated their claims of aerial victories that month. Sabre fliers claimed eight MiGs, and the Soviets 12 F-86s; the actual losses were three MiGs and at least four Sabres.

The British Chief of the Air Staff, Air Chief Marshal Sir John Slessor, commented: "not only is it faster than anything we are building today, but it is already being produced in very large numbers [...] The Russians, therefore, have achieved a four year lead over British development in respect of the vitally important interceptor fighter".

At the end of 1950, the Soviet Union assigned a new unit to support China, the 324th IAD (made up of two regiments: the 176th GIAP and 196th IAP). At that time, a MiG-15 interceptor regiment had 35 to 40 aircraft, and a division was usually composed of three regiments. When the new unit arrived at air bases along the Yalu River in March 1951, it had undergone preliminary training at Soviet bases in the neighboring Maritime Military Districts and started an intense period of air-to-air training in the MiG-15. The Soviets trained alongside Chinese and Korean pilots. Both regiments of the 324th IAD redeployed to the forward airbase in Antung and entered combat in early April 1951. The 303rd IAD of General Georgiy A. Lobov arrived in Korea in June of that same year and commenced combat operations in August.

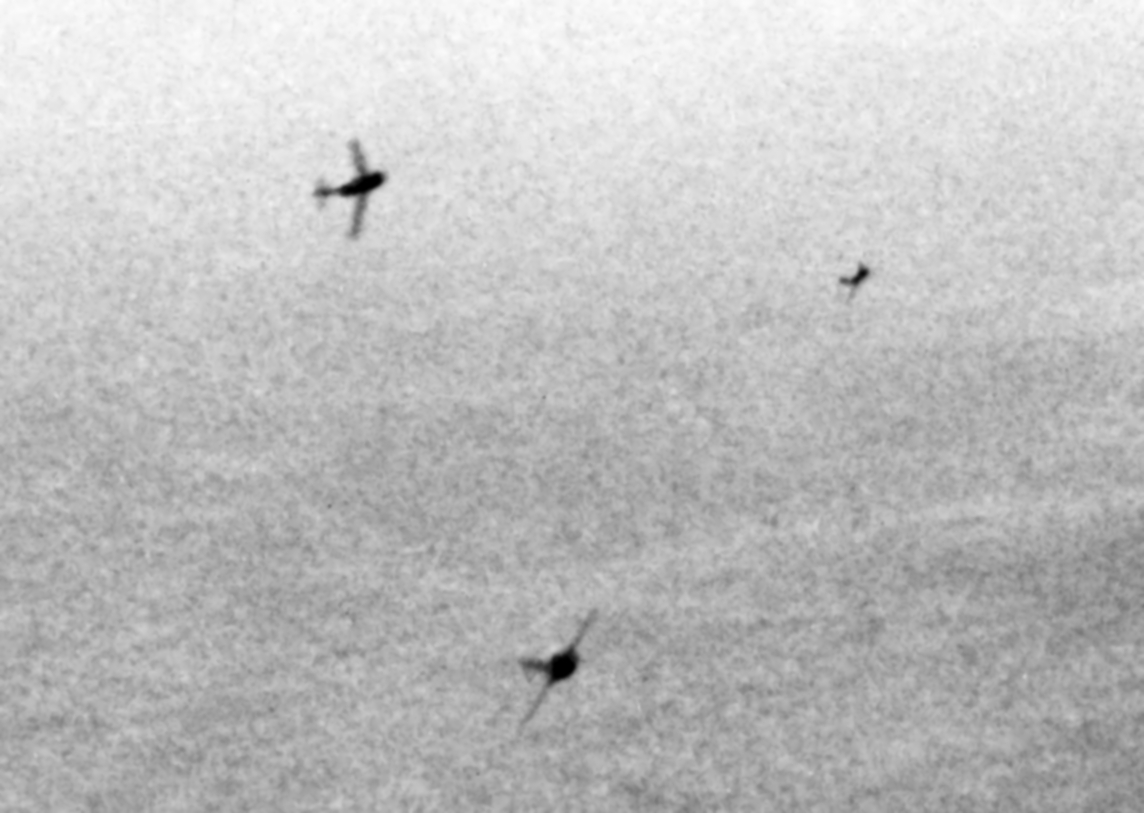
Mikoyan-Gurevich MiG-15 fighters curving in to attack US Air Force Boeing B-29 Superfortress bombers over Korea, c. 1951

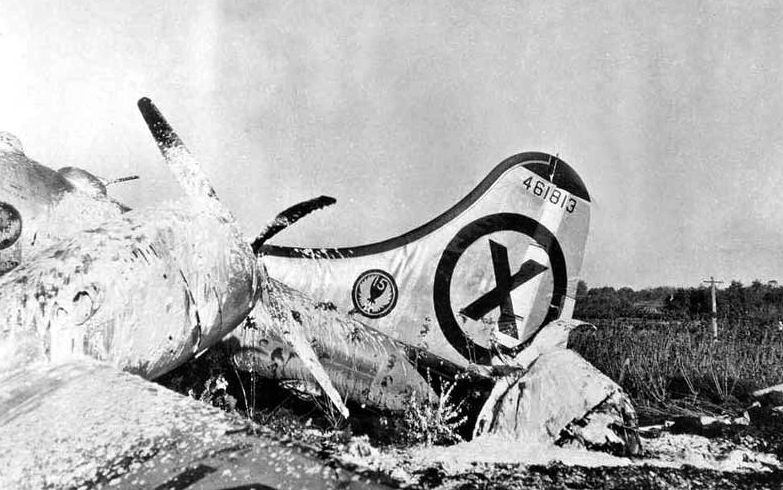
A photo-reconnaissance B-29 that crash-landed at Iruma Air Base, Japan after being severely damaged by MiG-15 fighters over the Yalu River; the B-29's tail gunner shot down one of the attackers (9 November 1950)

Soviet MiG pilots were trained to attack enemy formations in coordinated attacks from different directions, using both height and high speed to their advantage. The first encounters established the main features of the aerial battles of the next two and a half years. The MiG-15 and MiG-15bis had a higher ceiling than all versions of the Sabre – 15,500 m (50,900 ft) versus 15,000 m (49,000 ft) of the F-86F – and accelerated faster than F-86A/E/Fs due to their better thrust-to-weight ratio – 1,005 km/h (624 mph) versus 972 km/h (604 mph) of the F-86F. The MiG-15's 2,800 m (9,200 ft) per minute climbing rate was also greater than the 2,200 m (7,200 ft) per minute of the F-86A and -E (the F-86F matched the MiG-15). A better turn radius above 10,000 m (33,000 ft) further distinguished the MiG-15. The MiG was slower at low altitude – 935 km/h (581 mph) in the MiG-15bis configuration as opposed to the 1,107 km/h (688 mph) of the F-86F. All Sabres could also turn tighter below 8,000 m (26,000 ft). Thus, if the MiG-15 forced the Sabre to fight in the vertical plane or in the horizontal one above 10,000 m (33,000 ft), it gained a significant advantage. Furthermore, a MiG-15 could easily escape from a Sabre by climbing to its ceiling, knowing that the F-86 could not follow. Below 8,000 m (26,000 ft), however, the Sabre had a slight advantage over the MiG in most aspects excluding climb rate, especially if the Soviet pilot made the mistake of fighting in the horizontal. The MiG also had more powerful weaponry – one 37 mm N-37 cannon and two 23 mm NR-23 cannons, versus the six 12.7 mm (.50 in) machine guns of the Sabre. However, the Soviet World War II-era ASP-1N gyroscopic gunsight was less sophisticated than the accurate A-1CM and A4 radar ranging sights of the F-86E and -F.

The main mission of the MiG-15 was not to dogfight the F-86 but to counter the USAF Boeing B-29 Superfortress bombers. This mission was assigned to the elite of the Soviet Air Force (VVS), in April 1951 to the 324th IAD of Colonel Ivan Kozhedub, and later to the 303rd IAD of General Georgiy A. Lobov, who arrived in Korea in June of the same year.

On 12 April 1951, 44 MiG-15s took on a USAF formation of 48 B-29 Superfortresses escorted by 18 F-86 Sabres, 54 F-84 Thunderjets and 24 F-80 Shooting Stars heading towards the bridge linking North Korea and Red China over the Yalu River in Uiju. The experienced Soviet fliers shot down or damaged beyond repair 10 B-29As, one F-86A and three F-80Cs for the loss of only one MiG. The Soviet air units claimed to have shot down 29 American aircraft through the rest of the month: 11 F-80s, seven B-29s and nine F-51s. 23 out of these 29 claims match acknowledged losses, but US sources assert that most of them were either operational or due to flak, admitting only four B-29s (a downed B-29, plus two B-29s and an RB-29 that crash-landed or were damaged beyond repair). US historians agree that the MiG-15 gained aerial superiority over northwestern Korea.

US strategic bombers returned in the week of 22–27 October to neutralize the North Korean aerodromes of Namsi, Taechon and Saamchan, taking further losses to the MiG-15. On 23 October 1951, 56 MiG-15bis intercepted nine B-29s escorted by 34 F-86s and 55 F-84Es. In spite of their numerical inferiority, the Soviet airmen shot down or damaged beyond repair eight B-29As and two F-84Es, losing only one MiG in return and leading Americans to call that day "Black Tuesday". The most successful Soviet pilots that day were Lieutenant Colonel Aleksandr P. Smorchkov and 1st Lieutenant Dmitriy A. Samoylov. The former shot down a Superfortress on each of 22, 23 and 24 October. Samoylov added two F-86As to his tally on 24 October 1951, and on 27 October shot down two more aircraft: a B-29A and an F-84E. These losses among the heavy bombers forced the Far East Air Forces High Command to cancel the precision daylight attacks of the B-29s and only undertake radar-directed night raids. From November 1951 to January 1952, both sides tried to achieve air superiority over the Yalu, or at least tried to deny it to the enemy, and in consequence, the intensity of the aerial combat reached peaks not seen before between MiG-15 and F-86 pilots. During the period from November 1950 to January 1952, no fewer than 40 Soviet MiG-15 pilots were credited as aces, with five or more victories. Soviet combat records show that the first pilot to claim his fifth aerial victory was Captain Stepan Ivanovich Naumenko on 24 December 1950. The honor falls to Captain Sergei Kramarenko, when on 29 July 1951, he scored his actual fifth victory. Approximately 16 out of those 40 pilots actually became aces, the most successful being Major Nikolay Sutyagin, credited with 22 victories, 13 of which were confirmed by the US; Colonel Yevgeny Pepelyaev with 19 claims, 15 confirmed; and Major Lev Shchukin with 17 credited, 11 verified.

The MiG leaders, enjoying the advantage from the ground and the tactical advantage of an aircraft with superior altitude performance were able to dictate the tactical situation at least until the battle was started. They could decide to fight or stay out as they wished. The advantage of radar control from the ground also allowed the MiGs, if desired, to pass through the gaps in the F-86 patrol pattern.

==== January 1952 to July 1952 ====
At the end of January 1952, the 303rd IAD was replaced by the 97th (16th and 148th IAP) and in February the 324th IAD was replaced by the 190th IAD (256th, 494th and 821st IAP). These new units were poorly trained, the bulk of the pilots having only 50–60 hours flying the MiG. Consequently, those units suffered great losses from the now better-prepared American Sabre pilots. At least two Soviet fliers became aces during that period: Majors Arkadiy S. Boytsov and Vladimir N. Zabelin, with six and nine victories respectively.

During the six months of February to July 1952, they lost 81 MiGs, and 34 pilots were killed by F-86s, and in return, they only shot down 68 UN aircraft (including 36 F-86s). The greatest losses came on 4 July 1952, when 11 MiGs were downed by Sabres, with one pilot killed in action. Contributing to all this was the secret "Maple Special" Operation, a plan by Colonel Francis Gabreski to cross the Yalu River into Manchuria (something officially forbidden) and catch the MiGs unaware during their takeoffs or landings, when they were at disadvantage: flying slow, at a low level, and sometimes short of ammunition and fuel.

Even under these circumstances, MiG-15 pilots would score at least two important victories against US aces:

- 10 February 1952: Major George Andrew Davis, Jr., an ace credited with 14 victories, 10 confirmed by communist sources, was shot down and killed. The victor's identity was disputed between 1st Lieutenant Mikhail Akimovich Averin and Zhang Jihui.
- 4 July 1952: A few seconds after shooting down 1st Lieutenant M. I. Kosynkin, future ace Captain Clifford D. Jolley was forced to eject out of his crippled F-86E after being caught by surprise by MiG-15bis pilot 1st Lieutenant Vasily Romanovich Krutkikh.

==== July 1952 to July 1953 ====
In May 1952, new and better trained PVO divisions, the 133rd and 216th IADs, arrived in Korea. They would replace the 97th and 190th by July 1952, and if they could not take aerial superiority away from the now well-prepared Americans, then they certainly neutralized it between September 1952 and July 1953. In September 1952, the 32nd IAD also started combat operations. Again, the figures of victories and losses in the air are still debated by historians of the US and the former Soviet Union, but on at least three occasions, Soviet MiG-15 aces gained the upper hand against Sabre aces:

- 7 April 1953: The 10-kill ace Captain Harold E. Fischer was shot down over Manchuria shortly after causing damage to a Chinese and a Soviet MiG over Dapu airbase in Manchuria. The attacker's identity was disputed between 1st Lieutenant Grigoriy Nesterovich Berelidze and Han Dechai.
- 12 April 1953: Captain Semyon Alekseyevich Fedorets, a Soviet ace with eight victories, shot down the F-86E of Norman E. Green, but shortly afterward was attacked by the future top American ace of the Korean War, Captain Joseph C. McConnell. In the ensuing dogfight, they shot each other down, ejecting and being rescued safely.
- 20 July 1953: During a raid deep into Manchuria, and after shooting down two Chinese MiGs, Majors Thomas M. Sellers and Stephen L. Bettinger (the second an ace with five kills) tried to catch by surprise two Soviet MiG-15s that were landing in Dapu. The Soviet fliers skillfully forced the Americans to overshoot, reversed direction and shot both down: Captain Boris N. Siskov forced Bettinger to bail out and his wingman 1st Lieutenant Vladimir I. Klimov killed Major Sellers. This was Siskov's fifth victory, making him the last ace of the Korean War. Those were also the last Sabres downed by Soviet fliers in the war.

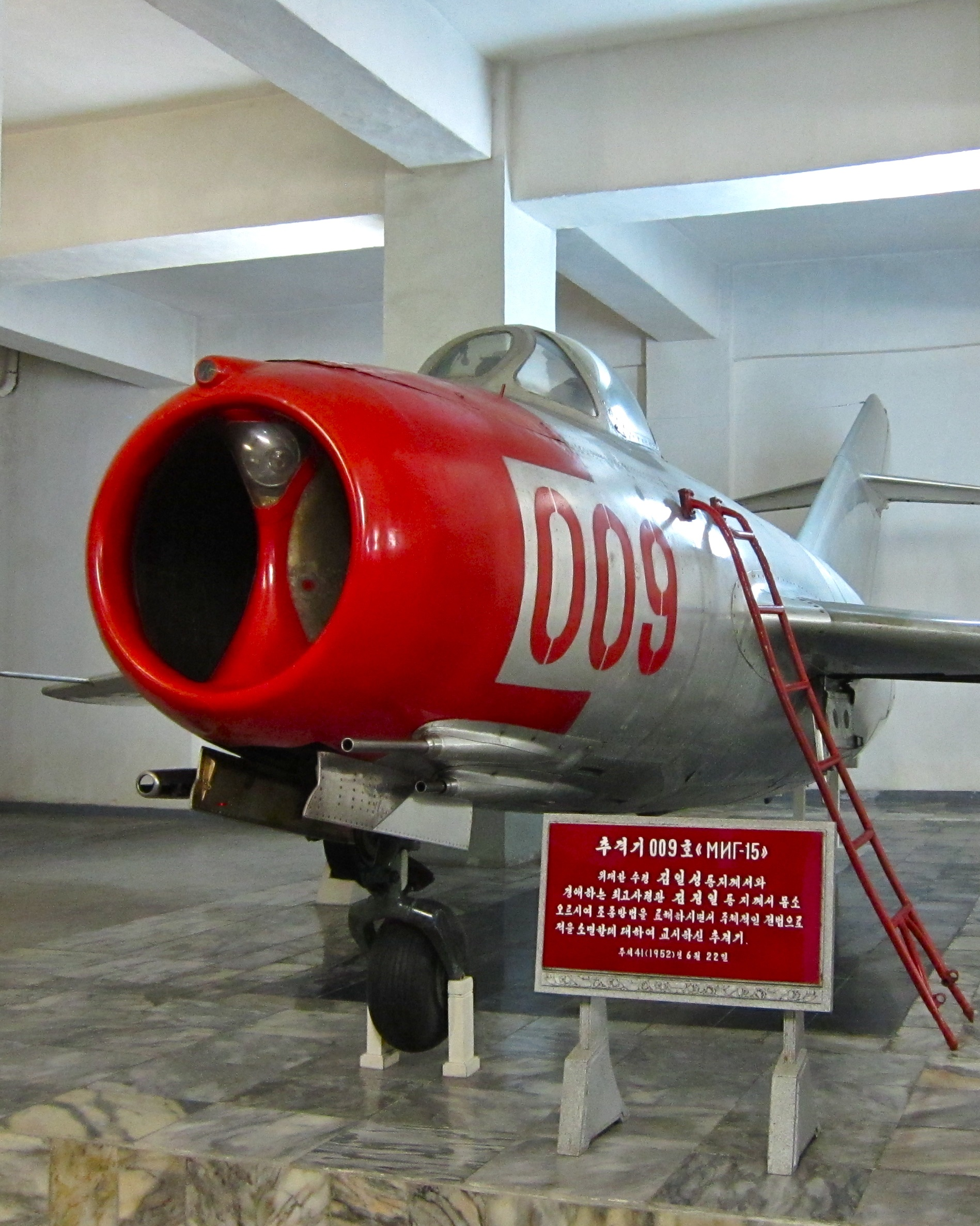
MiG-15bis from the Victorious Fatherland Liberation War Museum in North Korea

The MiG-15 threat forced the Far East Air Forces to cancel B-29 daylight raids in favor of night radar-guided missions from November 1951 onward. Initially, this presented a threat to Communist defenses, as their only specialized night-fighting unit was equipped with the prop-driven Lavochkin La-11, inadequate for the task of intercepting the B-29. Part of the regiment was re-equipped with the MiG-15bis, and another night-fighting unit joined the fray, causing American heavy bombers to suffer losses again. Between 21:50 and 22:30 on 10 June 1952, four MiG-15bis attacked B-29s over Sonchon and Kwaksan. Lieutenant Colonel Mikhail Ivanovich Studilin damaged a B-29A beyond repair, forcing it to make an emergency landing at Kimpo Air Base. A few minutes later, Major Anatoly Karelin added two more Superfortresses to his tally. Studilin and Karelin's wingmen, Major L. A. Boykovets and 1st Lieutenant Zhahmany Ihsangalyev, also damaged one B-29 each. Anatoly Karelin eventually became an ace with six kills (all B-29s at night). In the aftermath of these battles, B-29 night sorties were cancelled for two months. Originally conceived to shoot down rather than escort bombers, both of America's state-of-the-art jet night fighters – the F-94 Starfire and the F3D Skyknight – were committed to protecting the Superfortresses against MiGs.

The MiG-15 was less effective in getting past the Marine Corps ground-based two-seat F3D Skyknight night fighters assigned to escort B-29s after the F-94 Starfires proved ineffective. What the squat aircraft lacked in sheer performance, it made up for with the advantage of a search radar that enabled the Skyknight to see its targets clearly, while the MiG-15's directions to find bomber formations were of little use in seeing escorting fighters. On the night of 2–3 November 1952, a Skyknight with pilot Major William Stratton and radar operator Hans Hoagland damaged the MiG-15 of Captain V. D. Vishnyak. Five days later, Oliver R. Davis and radar operator D.F. "Ding" Fessler downed a MiG-15bis; the pilot, Lieutenant Ivan P. Kovalyov, ejected safely. Skyknights claimed five MiG kills for no losses of their own, and no B-29s escorted by them were lost to enemy fighters. However, the duel was not one-sided: on the night of 16 January 1953, an F3D almost did fall to a MiG, when the Skyknight of Captain George Cross and Master Sergeant J. A. Piekutowski suffered serious damage in an attack by a Soviet MiG-15bis; with difficulty, the Skyknight returned to Kunsan Air Base. Three and a half months later, on the night of 29 May 1953, Chinese MiG-15 pilot Hou Shujun of the PLAAF shot down an F3D-2 over Anju; Sgt. James V. Harrell's remains were found on a beach during the summer of 2001 just miles from the Kunsan base. Captain James B. Brown is still missing in action.

In a Royal Navy Sea Fury flying from a light fleet carrier FAA pilot Lieutenant Peter "Hoagy" Carmichael downed a MiG-15 on 8 August 1952, in air-to-air combat. The Sea Fury would be one of the few piston-engined fighter aircraft following World War II's end to shoot down a jet fighter. On 10 September 1952, Captain Jesse G. Folmar shot down a MiG-15 with an F4U Corsair but was himself downed by another MiG.

The figures given by the Soviet sources indicate that the MiG-15s of the 64th IAK (the fighter corps that included all the divisions that rotated through the conflict) made 60,450 daylight combat sorties and 2,779 night ones and engaged the enemy in 1,683 daylight aerial battles and 107 at night, claiming to have shot down 1,097 UN aircraft over Korea, including 647 F-86s, 185 F-84s, 118 F-80s, 28 F-51s, 11 F-94s, 65 B-29s, 26 Gloster Meteors and 17 aircraft of different types. According to US, 57 B-29s and reconnaissance variants were lost in combat during the Korean war, almost all by MiG-15s.

=== Chinese and Korean MiG-15s during the Korean War ===
The Soviet VVS and PVO were the primary users of the MiG-15 during the war; it was also used by the PLAAF and KPAF (unified under an organizational structure called 1st United Air Army). Despite complaints from the Soviet Union, which repeatedly requested that the Chinese accelerate the introduction of MiG-15, by 1951 there were only two regiments flying MiG-15bis as night fighters. Being not completely trained and equipped, both units were used only for the defence of China, but they became involved in the interception of USAF reconnaissance aircraft, some of which went very deep over China.

By September 1951, with enough MiG-15s in the Yalu area, Soviet and Chinese leaders were confident enough to begin planning the deployment of Chinese and new North Korean MiG-15 regiments outside Chinese sanctuaries. Excluding a brief episode in January 1951, the PLAAF did not see action until 25 September 1951, when 16 MiG-15s engaged Sabres, with pilot Li Yongtai claiming a victory, but losing a MiG and its pilot. The North Korean unit equipped with the MiG-15 got into action a year later, in September 1952. From then until the end of the war, units in the 1st United Air Army claimed to have shot down 211 F-86s, 72 F-84s and F-80s, and 47 other aircraft of various types, losing 116 Chinese airmen and 231 aircraft: 224 MiG-15s, three La-11s and four Tupolev Tu-2s. Several pilots were credited with five or more enemy aircraft, such as Zhao Baotong with seven victories, Wang Hai with nine kills, and both Kan Yon Duk and Kim Di San with five.

Based on Soviet archival data, 335 Soviet MiG-15s are known to have been admitted as lost over Korea. Chinese claims of their losses amount to 224 MiG-15s over Korea. North Korean losses are not known, but according to North Korean defectors their air force lost around 100 MiG-15s during the war. Thus a total of 659 MiG-15s are admitted as being lost by all causes, while USAF claims of their losses amount to 78 F-86 Sabres in air-to-air combat. Overall UN losses to MiG-15s are credited as 78 F-86 Sabres and 75 aircraft of other types. However, one modern source claims that the USAF has more recently cited 224 losses (circa 100 to air combat) out of 674 F-86s deployed to Korea. Conversely, data-matching with Soviet records shows that US pilots routinely attributed their own combat losses to "landing accidents" and "other causes". According to official US data ("USAF Statistical Digest FY1953"), the USAF lost 250 F-86 fighters in Korea: 184 were lost in combat (78 in air-combat, 19 by Anti-aircraft gun, 26 were "unknown causes" and 61 were "other losses") and 66 in accidents.

More recent research by Dorr, Lake and Thompson has claimed the actual ratio is closer to 2 to 1. The Soviets claimed to have downed over 600 Sabres, together with the Chinese claims. A recent RAND report made reference to "recent scholarship" of F-86 v MiG-15 combat over Korea and concluded that the actual kill:loss ratio for the F-86 was 1.8 to 1 overall, and likely closer to 1.3 to 1 against MiGs flown by Soviet pilots. However, this ratio did not count the number of aircraft of other types (B-29, A-26, F-80, F-82, F-84...) that were shot down by MiG-15s.

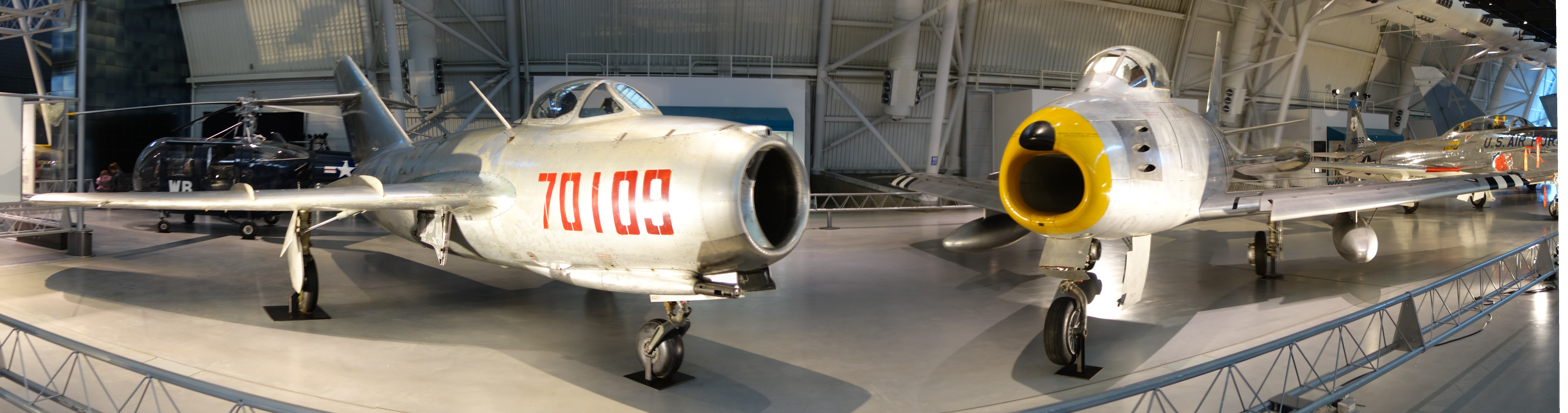
MiG-15 (left) and F-86 Sabre (right) on display at the Steven F. Udvar-Hazy Center, National Air and Space Museum

=== Defection ===
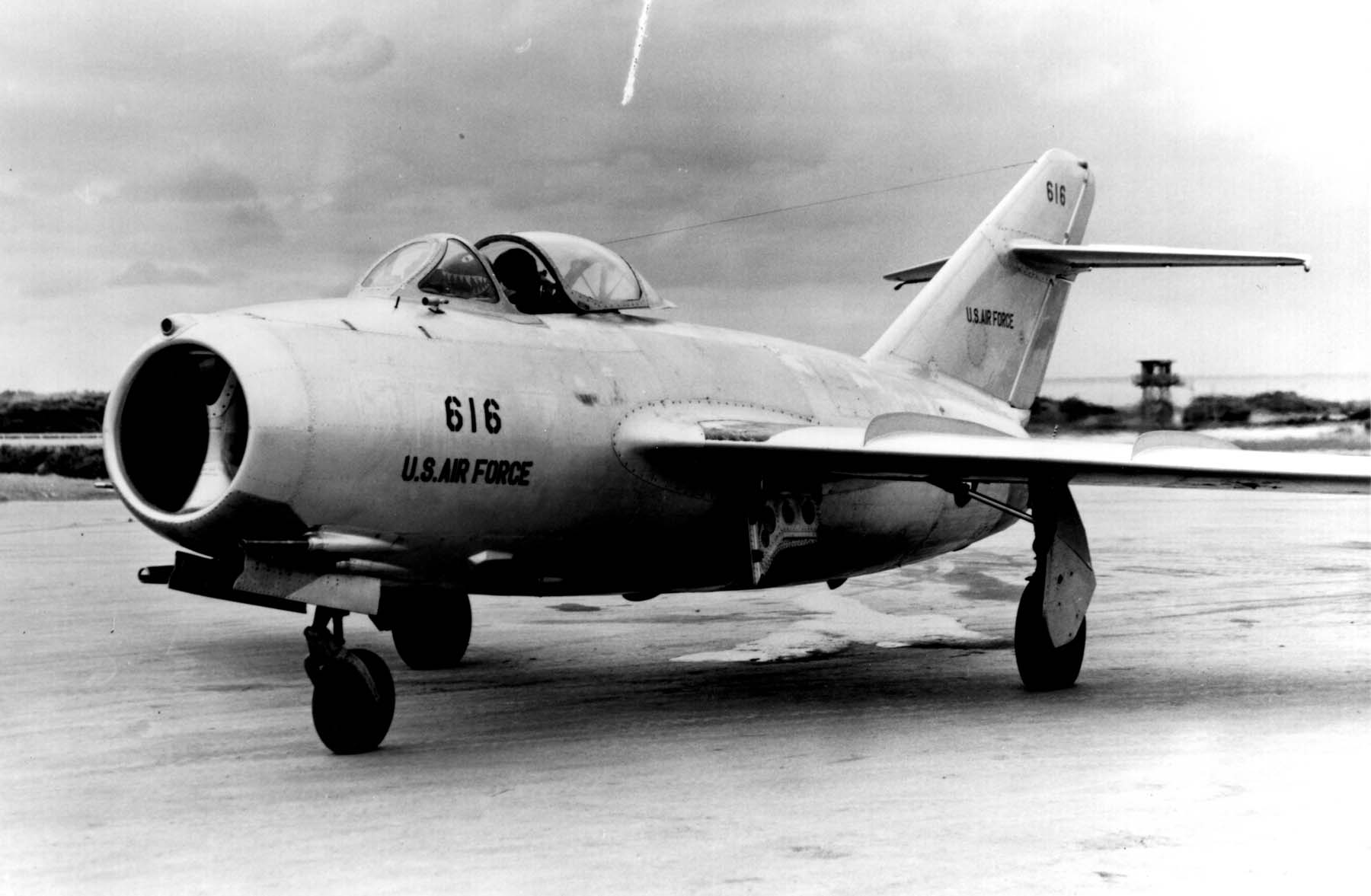
MiG-15 delivered by the defecting North Korean pilot No Kum-Sok to the US Air Force

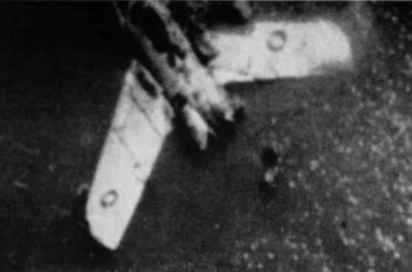
Photograph of a wrecked Mikoyan-Gurevich MiG-15 fighter that was analyzed by United Nations' forces in the Korean War

In April 1951, a crashed MiG-15 was spotted near the Chongchon River. On 17 April 1951, a USAF Sikorsky H-19 staging through Baengnyeongdo carried a US/South Korean team to the crash site. They photographed the wreck and removed the turbine blades, combustion chamber, exhaust pipe and horizontal stabilizer. The overloaded helicopter then flew the team and samples back to Paengyong-do, where they were transferred to an SA-16 and flown south and then to Wright-Patterson Air Force Base, Ohio, for evaluation.

In July 1951, the submerged remains of a MiG-15 were spotted by Royal Navy carrier aircraft from HMS Glory. The MiG-15 was broken up, a piece of the engine was visible aft of the center section, and the tail section was located some distance away. The wreck was located in an area of mudbanks with treacherous tides and at the end of a narrow channel that was supposedly mined, about 160 km (100 mi) behind the front lines. The MiG-15 was retrieved, transported to Incheon and then to Wright-Patterson Air Force Base.

Eager to obtain an intact MiG for combat testing in a controlled environment, the United States launched Operation Moolah, which offered to any pilot who defected with his MiG-15, political asylum and a reward of US$100,000 (equivalent to $960,000 in 2025). Franciszek Jarecki, a Polish Air Force pilot, defected from Soviet-controlled Poland in a MiG-15 on the morning of 5 March 1953, incidentally the same day Josef Stalin died, allowing Western air experts to examine the aircraft for the first time. Jarecki flew from Słupsk to the field airport at Rønne on the Danish island of Bornholm. The whole trip took him only a few minutes. Specialists from the United States, called to the airfield by the Danish authorities, thoroughly examined the aircraft. According to international regulations, they then returned it by ship to Poland a few weeks later. Jarecki also received a $50,000 reward for being the first to present a MiG-15 to the Americans and became a US citizen. (Note: According to a thesis published by Coleman Armstrong Mehta in 2006, Yugoslavia provided the CIA with a MiG-15 in flying condition as early as November 1951.)

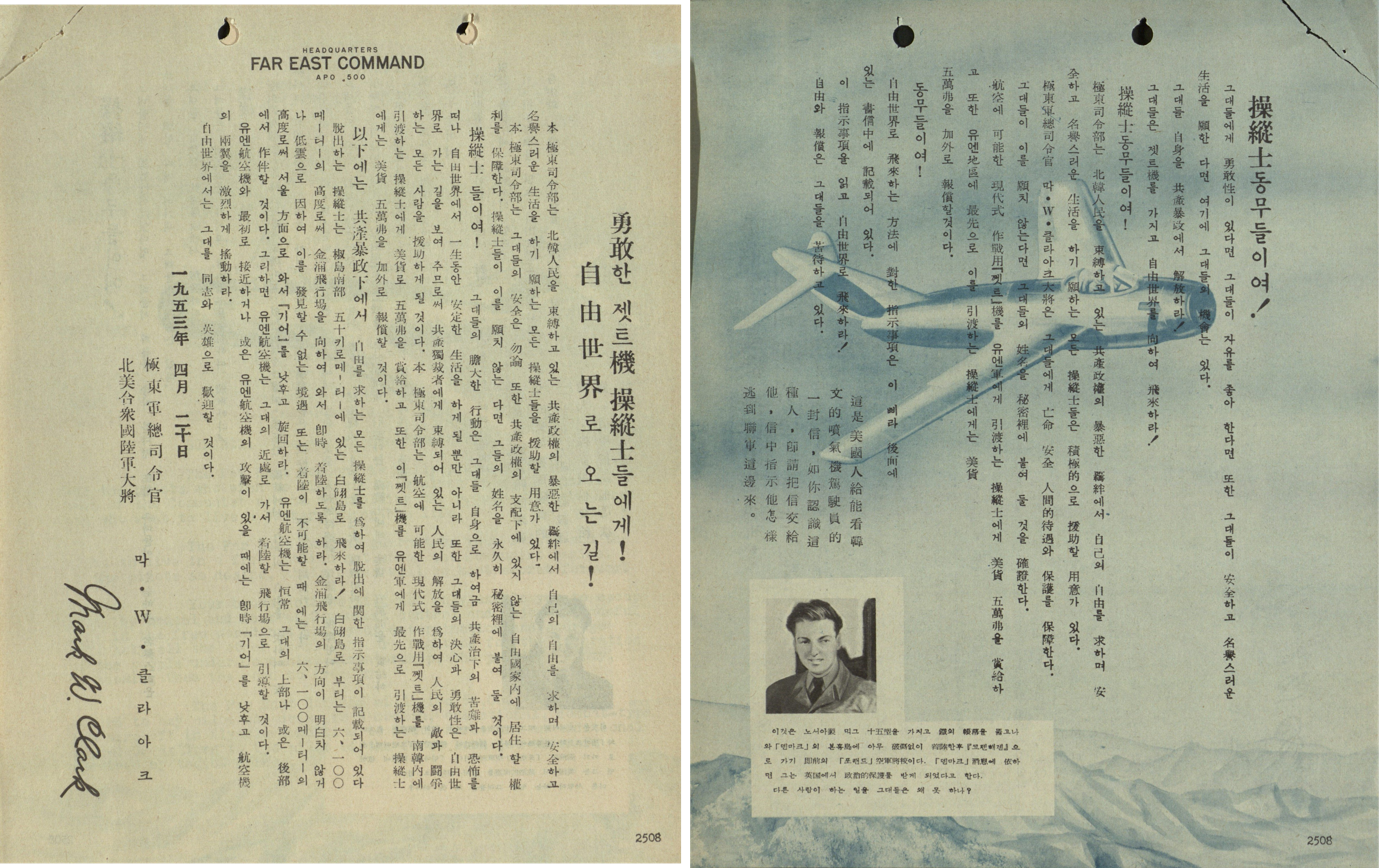
An Operation Moolah propaganda leaflet promising a $100,000 reward to the first North Korean pilot to deliver a jet fighter to UN forces

Following this example, a total of four Polish MiG-15 pilots defected. No military maps showed foreign Baltic coastlines and so Franciszek Jarecki navigated using a basic school atlas, three of the four pilots managed to find the small island of Bornholm while one arrived at the Swedish Coast approximately 80 km (50 mi) North of Bornholm.

On 21 September 1953 North Korean Lieutenant No Kum-Sok (Note: The name No Kum-Sok follows Korean naming conventions; No is the surname and Kum-Sok is the given name.) defected, landing his MiG-15 at Kimpo Air Base. After landing he claimed to be unaware of the US$100,000 reward. This MiG-15 was minutely inspected and was test flown by several test pilots, including Chuck Yeager. Yeager reported in his autobiography the MiG-15 had dangerous handling faults and claimed that during a visit to the USSR, Soviet pilots were incredulous he had dived in it, this supposedly being very hazardous. No informed the Americans that spins in the aircraft were considered very dangerous, and that the KPAF instructed pilots to eject if unable to recover from a spin within three turns. Remarking on the MiG-15's unforgiving behavior, particularly in the hands of an inexperienced pilot, Yeager characterized it as a "flying booby trap". Lieutenant No's aircraft is now on display at the National Museum of the United States Air Force near Dayton, Ohio.

=== The Cold War ===
During the 1950s, the MiG-15s of the USSR and their Warsaw Pact allies on many occasions, intercepted aircraft of the NATO air forces performing reconnaissance near or inside their territory; such incidents sometimes ended with aircraft of one side or the other being shot down. The known incidents where the MiG-15 was involved include:

- 16 December 1950: A USAF RB-29 was downed over Primore (Sea of Japan) by two MiG-15 pilots, Captain Stepan A. Bajaev and 1st Lieutenant N. Kotov.
- 19 November 1951: MiG-15bis pilot 1st Lieutenant A. A. Kalugin forced a USAF C-47 that had penetrated Hungarian airspace to land at the airbase at Pápa.
- 13 June 1952: Two naval MiG-15s, flown by Captain Oleg Piotrovich Fedotov and 1st Lieutenant Ivan Petrovich Proskurin, shot down an RB-29A near Valentin Bay, over the Sea of Japan. All 12 crew members perished (their bodies were not recovered).
- 13 June 1952, Catalina affair: A Soviet MiG-15 flown by Captain Osinskiy shot down a Douglas DC-3 reconnaissance aircraft of the Swedish Air Force piloted by Alvar Almeberg near Ventspils over the Baltic Sea. All eight crew members perished. One of the two Swedish military Catalina flying boats that conducted subsequent search and rescue for the downed DC-3 was also shot down by a MiG-15, though with no loss of life.
- 7 August 1952: Two MiG-15 pilots, 1st Lieutenants Zeryakov and Lesnov, shot down a USAF RB-29 over the Kuril Islands. The entire crew of nine died (the remains of one, Captain John R. Durnham, were returned to the United States in 1993).
- 18 November 1952: Four MiG-15bis engaged four F9F-2 Panthers off the aircraft carrier USS Oriskany (CV-34) near Vladivostok. One MiG-15 pilot, Captain Dmitriy Belyakov, managed to seriously damage Lieutenant Junior Grade David M. Rowlands's F9F-2, but seconds later he and 1st Lieutenant Vandalov were downed by Elmer Royce Williams and John Davidson Middleton. Neither Soviet pilot was found. Later accounts reported that only Lt. Royce Williams was responsible for downing four MiG-15s from a formation of seven MiGs. However, due to the sensitive nature of the mission, Williams was credited with only one confirmed kill while the other three kills were credited to the other pilots who had avoided the engagement.
- 10 March 1953, Air battle over Merklín: Two MiG-15bis of the Czechoslovak Air Force intercepted two F-84Gs in Czechoslovak airspace. Lieutenant Jaroslav Šrámek shot down one of them; the F-84 crashed in Bavarian territory. The US pilot bailed out safely.
- 12 March 1953: Seven airmen were killed when the Royal Air Force Avro Lincoln they were flying in was shot down by a Soviet Air Force MiG-15 in the Berlin air corridor, near Boizenburg, 51 kilometres (32 mi) northeast of Lüneburg.
- 29 July 1953: Two MiG-15bis intercepted a RB-50G near Gamov, in the Sea of Japan, and instructed it to land at their home base. The RB-50 gunners opened fire and hit the MiG of 1st Lieutenant Aleksandr D. Rybakov. Rybakov and his wingman 1st Lieutenant Yuriy M. Yablonskiy then shot down the RB-50. One of the crew members (John E. Roche) was rescued alive, and three corpses were recovered. The remaining 13 crew members became missing-in-action.
- 17 April 1955: MiG-15 pilots Korotkov and Sazhin shot down an RB-47E north of the Kamchatka peninsula. All three crew members perished.
- 27 June 1955: El Al Flight 402 was shot down by two Bulgarian MiG-15 aircraft after penetrating Bulgarian airspace. All 58 passengers and crew perished in the attack.

=== Suez Canal Crisis (1956) ===
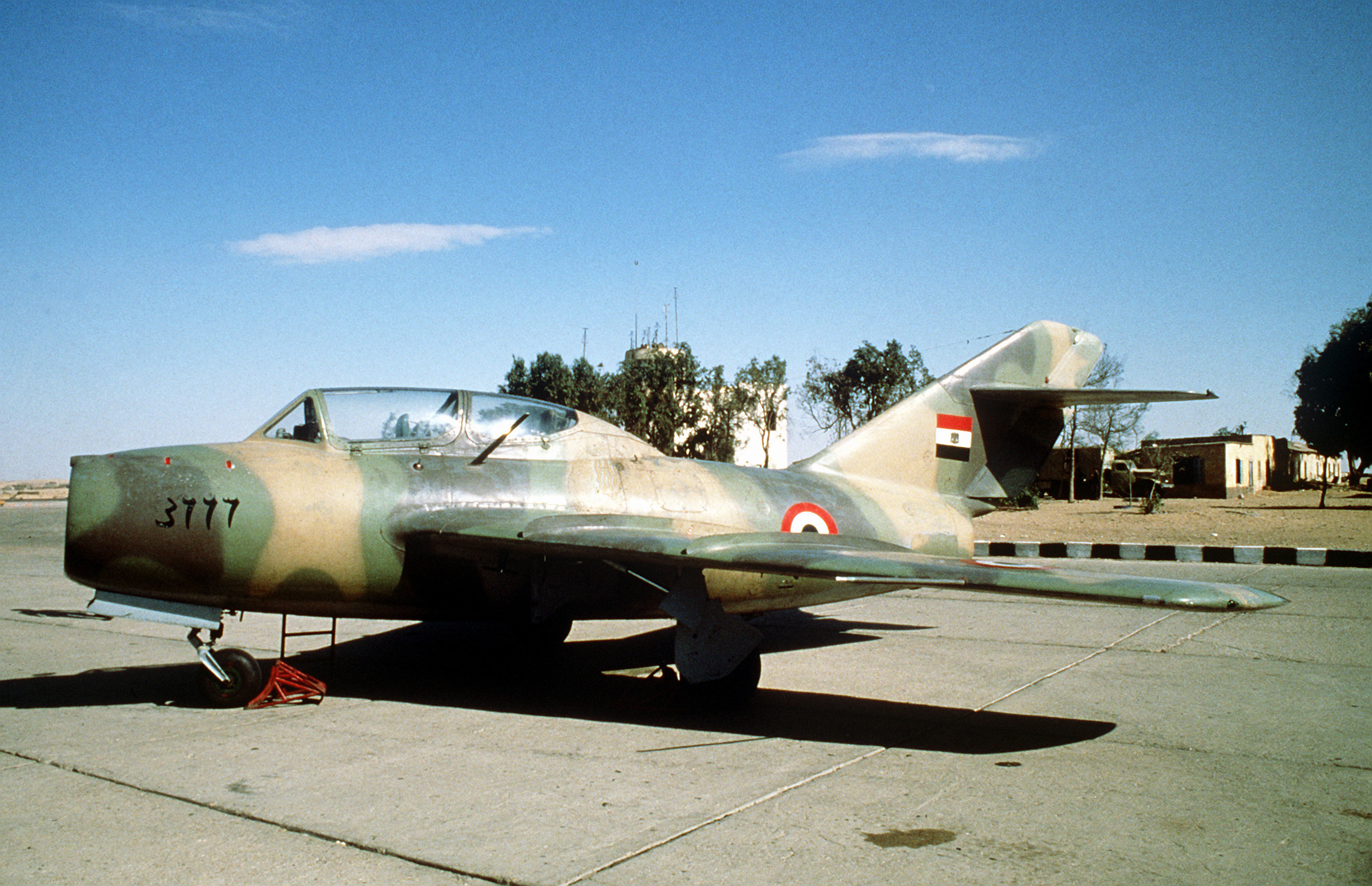
An Egyptian MiG-15UTI in 1981

Egypt bought two squadrons of MiG-15bis and MiG-17 fighters in 1955 from Czechoslovakia with the sponsorship and support of the USSR, just in time to participate in the Suez Canal Crisis. By the outbreak of the Suez conflict in October 1956, four squadrons of the Egyptian Air Force were equipped with the type, although few pilots were trained to fly them effectively.

They first saw aerial action on the morning of 30 October, intercepting four RAF Canberra bombers on a reconnaissance mission over the Canal Zone, damaging one. Later that day, MiG-15s attacked Israeli forces at Mitla Pass and El Thamed in the Sinai, destroying half a dozen vehicles. As a result, the Israeli Air Force (IAF) instituted a standing combat air patrol over the Canal, and the next attack resulted in two MiGs downed by IAF Mysteres, although the Egyptian aircraft were able to successfully hit the Israeli troops.

The next day, the MiGs evened the score somewhat when they badly damaged two IAF Ouragan fighters, forcing one of them to crash-land in the desert. British and French warplanes then began a systematic bombing campaign of Egyptian air bases, destroying at least eight MiGs and dozens of other Egyptian aircraft on the ground and forcing the others to disperse. The remaining aircraft still managed to fly some attack missions, but the Egyptians had lost air superiority.

During air combat against the IAF, Egyptian MiG-15bis managed to shoot down two Israeli aircraft: a Gloster Meteor F.8 on 30 October 1956, and a Dassault Ouragan on 1 November, which performed a belly landing – this last victory was scored by the Egyptian pilot Faruq el-Gazzavi. A third aircraft, an L-8 Piper Cub, was destroyed on the ground.

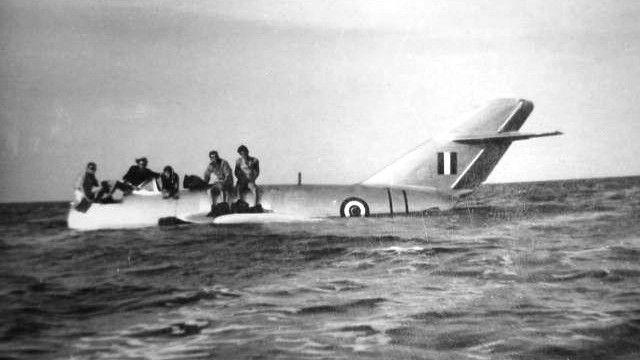
Egyptian MiG-15bis, Lake Bardawil, 1956

An Egyptian MiG-15 was damaged, but the pilot managed to ditch in Lake Bardawil, and the aircraft was salvaged by Israeli forces.

=== Taiwan Straits crisis ===
After the Korean War ended, Communist China turned its attention back to Nationalist China on the island of Taiwan. Chinese MiG-15s were in action over the Taiwan Strait against the outnumbered Nationalist Air Force (CNAF) and helped make possible the Communist occupation of two strategic island groups. The US had been lending support to the Nationalists since 1951 and started delivery of F-86s in 1955. Sabres and MiGs clashed three years later in the Quemoy Crisis. Throughout the 1950s, MiG-15s of China's People's Liberation Army Air Force (PLAAF) frequently engaged Republic of China (ROC) and US aircraft in combat; in 1958 a ROC F-86 fighter achieved the first air-to-air kill with an AIM-9 Sidewinder air-to-air missile against a PLAAF MiG-15.

=== Vietnam ===
Vietnam operated a number of MiG-15s and MiG-15UTIs for training only. There is no mention of the MiG-15 being involved in any combat against American aircraft in the early stages of the Vietnam War.

=== Other events ===
The first person in space, Yuri Gagarin, was killed in a crash during a March 1968 training flight in a MiG-15UTI due to poor visibility and miscommunication with ground control.

=== MiG-17 ===
The more advanced MiG-17 Fresco was very similar in appearance, but addressed many of the limitations of the MiG-15. It introduced a new swept wing with a "compound sweep" configuration: a 45° angle near the fuselage, and a 42° angle for the outboard part of the wings. The first prototype was flown in 1953 before the end of the Korean war. Later versions introduced radar, afterburning engines and missiles.

== Production ==
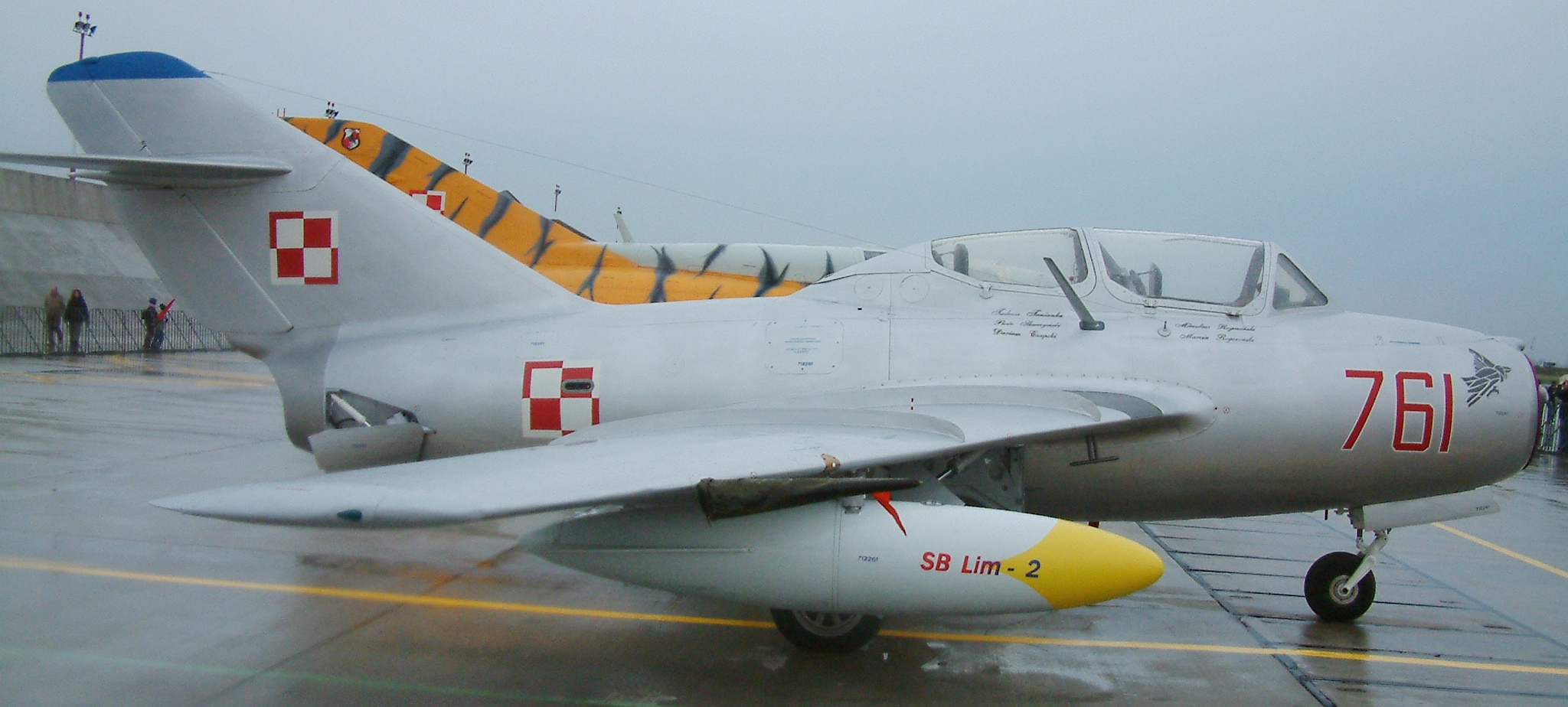
SB Lim-2 of the Polish Air Force

The USSR built 1344 MiG-15, 8352 MiG-15bis and 3434 two-seaters. It was also built under license in Czechoslovakia as the S-102 (MiG-15, 821 aircraft), S-103 (MiG-15bis, 620 aircraft) and CS-102 (MiG-15UTI, 2012 aircraft) and Poland as the Lim-1 (MiG-15, 227 aircraft) and Lim-2 (MiG-15bis, 500 aircraft). No two-seaters have been built in Poland as such – the SB Lim-1 and SB Lim-2 variants were remanufactured from hundreds of Polish-, Czech- and Soviet-built single-seaters.

In the early 1950s, the Soviet Union delivered hundreds of MiG-15s to China, where they received the designation J-2. The Soviets also sent 847 MiG-15 engineers and specialists to China, where they assisted China's Shenyang Aircraft Factory to prepare to build jet fighters. It was originally planned to build the MiG-15bis fighter at Shenyang, but China decided to build the more advanced MiG-17 fighter instead, together with the MiG-15UTI trainer (designated JJ-2). China never produced a single-seat fighter version, only the two-seat JJ-2, although during the Korean War, Shenyang was used for the repair of battle-damaged MiG-15. The number of JJ-2s built remains unknown and the estimates vary between 120 and 500 aircraft.

The designation "J-4" is unclear; some sources claim Western observers mistakenly labelled China's MiG-15bis a "J-4", while the PLAAF never used the "J-4" designation. Others claim "J-4" is used for MiG-17F, while "J-5" is used for MiG-17PF. Another source claims the PLAAF used "J-4" for Soviet-built MiG-17A, which were quickly replaced by license-built MiG-17Fs (J-5s).

== Variants ==
=== Prototype designations ===
I-310
(Russian: И-310) Designation of S-01, S-02, and S-03 prototypes.
I-312
(Russian: И-312) Designation of Samolyot ST prototypes.

=== Military designations ===
MiG-15
(Russian: МиГ-15) Military designation of Samolyot SV, first production version powered by a Klimov RD-45F. The aircraft was given the product code Izdeliye 50.
MiG-15PB
(Russian: МиГ-15ПБ) Podvyesnije Baki (Belly Tank), production variant capable of carrying two 250 litres (66 US gal) drop tanks on the bomb racks. Once modifications became standard on production aircraft, the "PB" was dropped and the designation reverted to MiG-15.
MiG-15S
(Russian: МиГ-15С) Soprovozdenije (Escort), production variant capable of carrying two 300-or-400-litre (79 or 106 US gal) or drop tanks, or two 600-litre (160 US gal) underwing tanks on the bomb racks. Once modifications became standard on production aircraft, the "S" was dropped and the designation reverted to MiG-15.
MiG-15SV
(Russian: МиГ-15СВ) Soprovozdenije Vysoto (High Altitude Escort), variant with underwing fuel tanks and NR-23 autocannons.
MiG-15U
(Russian: МиГ-15У) Ustanovka (Weapon-Swiveling Device), military designation of Samolyot SU. One built.
MiG-15bis
(Russian: МиГ-15бис) Samolyot SD, improved single-seat fighter version powered by a Klimov VK-1 and with enlarged air brakes. Changes made during production include the replacement of the NS-23 autocannons with the NR-23, the addition of an OSP-48 instrument landing system, and a revised canopy to improve view. Aircraft produced at the Gorky factory were given the product code Izdeliye 53, while aircraft produced at the Kuybyshev factory were Izdeliye 55 (same as the MiG-15bisR).
MiG-15bisF
(Russian: МиГ-15бисФ) MiG-15bis modified for unarmed reconnaissance with armament removed to make room for AFA-1M and AFP-21KT cameras.
MiG-15bisR
(Russian: МиГ-15бисР) Rasvedtchik (Reconnaissance), military designation of Samolyot SR, MiG-15bis modified for armed reconnaissance with the 37 mm and one 23 mm autocannon removed to make room for AFA-1M and AFP-21KT cameras. Also known as the MiG-15Rbis. The aircraft was given the product code Izdeliye 55.
MiG-15bisS
(Russian: МиГ-15бисС) Soprovozdenije (Escort), long-range escort fighter based on the Samolyot SD-UPB. Also known as the MiG-15Sbis. Once modifications became standard production aircraft, the "S" was dropped and the designation reverted to MiG-15bis.
MiG-15bisP
(Russian: МиГ-15бисП) Samolyot SP-5, prototype single-seat all-weather interceptor version of the MiG-15bis with an RP-1 Izumrud radar. Also known as the MiG-15P.
Burlaki
(Russian: Бурлаки) Proposed parasite fighter based on the MiG-15bis that would be towed behind a Tupolev Tu-4 via a winch. Project canceled after the Tu-4 was replaced by the Tupolev Tu-16.
MiG-15LL
(Russian: МиГ-15ЛЛ) Samolyot SYe, experimental variant with an enlarged vertical tail and stiffened wings with square-tipped ailerons to improve high-speed handling.

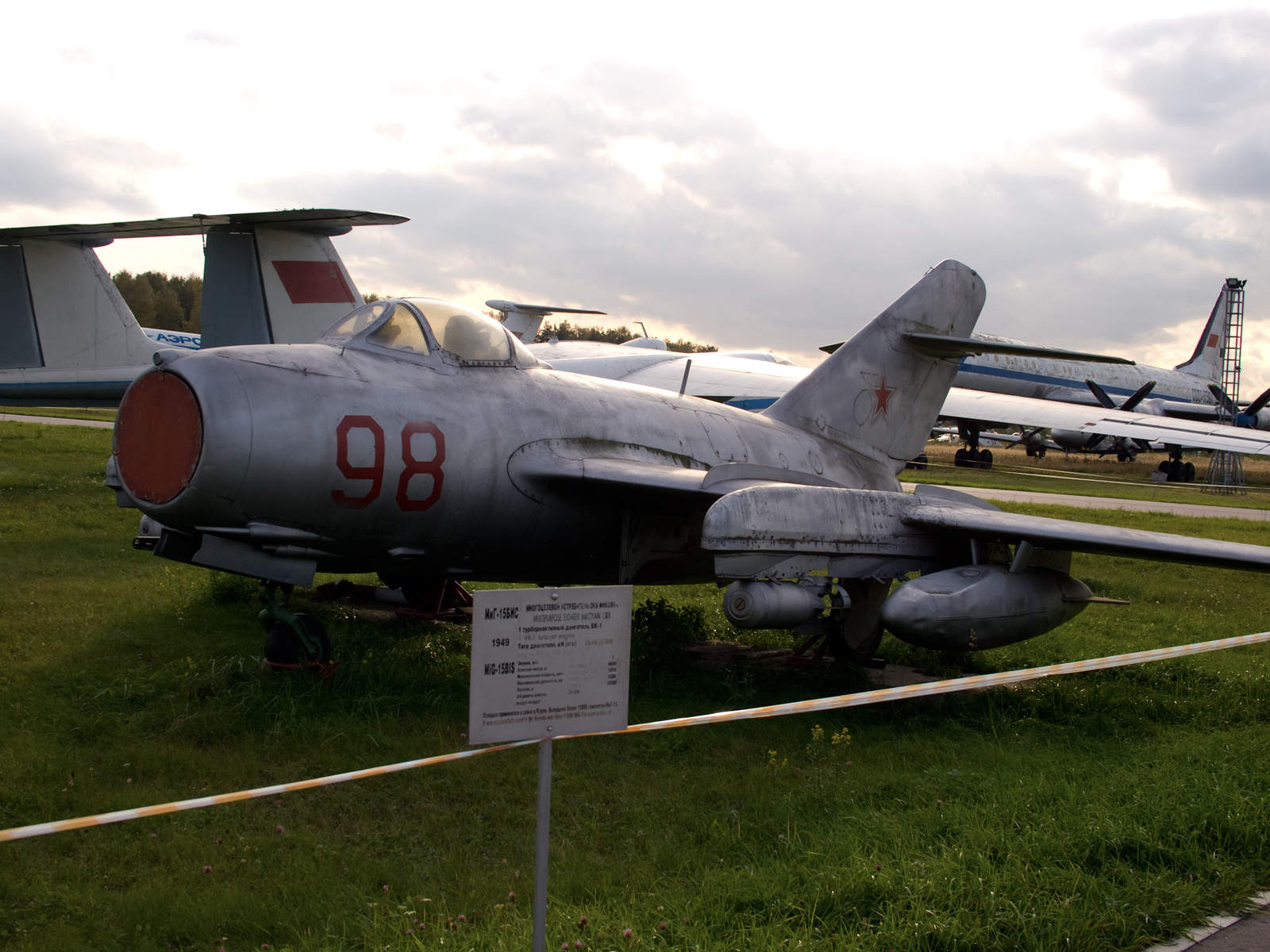
MiG-15ISh at the Monino Aircraft Museum

MiG-15ISh
(Russian: МиГ-15ИШ) Istrebitel Shturmovik (fighter, armored attacker), experimental attack variant with two wing-mounted beam-like pylons each capable of carrying two bombs in tandem or rocket launchers. Reports disagree on the number built, with one claiming only a single aircraft was built and another stating 12 were built.
MiG-15M (МиГ-15М)
(Russian: МиГ-15М) Mishen (Target), target UAV, converted from single-seat MiG-15. Also known as the M-15.

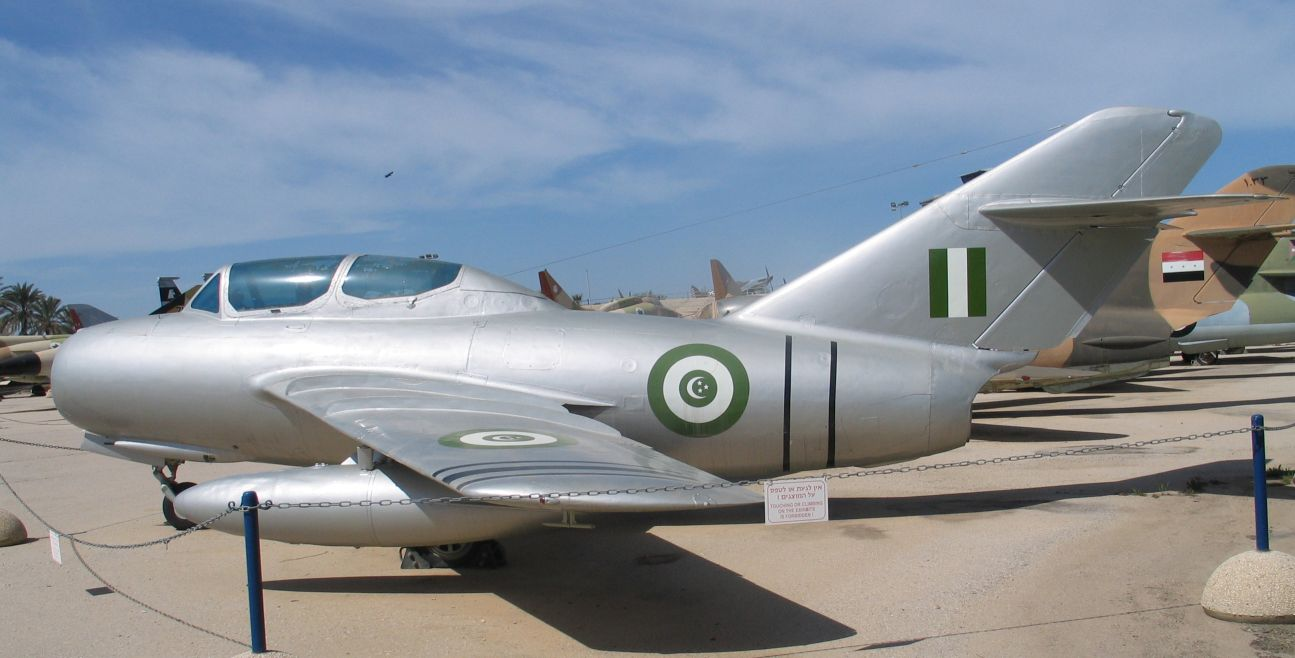
A MiG-15UTI at the Israeli Air Force Museum, Hatzerim, in 1945–58 Egyptian Air Force markings

UTI MiG-15
(Russian: УТИ МиГ-15) Samolyot ST-2, two-seat trainer armed with a single 12.7 mm A-12.7 machine gun. Also known as the MiG-15UTI.
UTI MiG-15P
(Russian: УТИ МиГ-15П) Samolyot ST-7, modified UTI MiG-15 with an RP-1 Izumrud radar and armed with a single 12.7 mm UBK-E. One prototype converted from a MiG-15UTI as ST-7, followed by a small number to service units as UTI MiG-15P.
UTI MiG-15LL
(Russian: УТИ МиГ-15ЛЛ) Samolyot ST-10, testbed aircraft for ejection seats. At least five converted from MiG-15UTIs. Also known as the MiG-15UTI-LL.
UTI MiG-15stk
(Russian: УТИ МиГ-15стк) Unofficial designation of an ejection seat trainer with an open rear cockpit. At least two UTI MiG-15s were modified.

=== OKB designations ===
Samolyot S-01
(Russian: Самолёт С-01) First prototype, powered by a Rolls-Royce Nene-1 engine and armed with a single 37 mm NS-37 and two 23 mm NS-23 autocannons. Also known as S-1.
Samolyot S-02
(Russian: Самолёт С-02) Second prototype, powered by a Rolls-Royce Nene-2, with revised landing gear doors and canopy, more complete avionics package, and other small changes. Also known as S-2.
Samolyot S-03
(Russian: Самолёт С-03) Third prototype, powered by a Rolls-Royce Nene-2, with air brakes, altered tail configuration, increased fuel capacity, and provisions for underwing bombs. Also known as S-3.
Samolyot S
(Russian: Самолёт С) Single pre-production aircraft, as S-03 but with several changes including air brakes skinned with EI-100N steel instead of duralumin and powered by a Klimov RD-45F.
Samolyot SV
(Russian: Самолёт СВ) First production version powered by a Klimov RD-45F. Entered service as the MiG-15.
Samolyot SA-1
(Russian: Самолёт СА-1) Experimental variant fitted with an OSP-48 instrument landing system as well as other improvements. One converted from a MiG-15. The OSP-48 became standard on later production MiG-15bis aircraft. The aircraft was originally the second Moscow-built MiG-15, construction number 3810102, which was fitted with a Klimov VK-1 instead of the standard RD-45F engine. This has led to the aircraft often being confused for a MiG-15bis, which was fitted with the VK-1 as standard.
Samolyot SA-2
(Russian: Самолёт СА-2) Experimental variant similar to the SA-1. One aircraft converted but never submitted for acceptance trials.
Samolyot SA-3
(Russian: Самолёт СА-3) Experimental variant fitted with an OSP-48 instrument landing system similar to the SA-1, for which the SA-3 is often mistaken as a predecessor. One converted from a production MiG-15. Sixteen RD-45F-powered production MiG-15s were converted to a similar standard for service trials and are often mistaken for the SA-3.
Samolyot SA-4
(Russian: Самолёт СА-4) Experimental variant fitted with an OSP-48 landing system and many other improvements that later became standard on production aircraft. One converted from a production MiG-15.
Samolyot SO
(Russian: Самолёт СО) Experimental variant to test improvements to pilot protection, including a thickened windscreen, an armored back and headrest, and a sliding gun sight to reduce the chance of head injury during a crash.
Samolyot SSh
(Russian: Самолёт СШ) Experimental variant with the two left guns replaced by a single 23 mm Sh-3 cannon. Two aircraft modified from MiG-15s.
Samolyot SU
(Russian: Самолёт СУ) Experimental variant with all armament replaced by two 23 mm Sh-3 cannons with variable-angle mounts that could automatically track targets. One converted from a production MiG-15.
Samolyot SD
(Russian: Самолёт СД) Improved single-seat fighter version powered by a Klimov VK-1 and with enlarged air brakes. Entered service as the MiG-15bis.
Samolyot SD-P
(Russian: Самолёт СД-П) Parashyutom (Parachute), experimental aircraft to test anti-skid systems and drogue parachutes.
Samolyot SD-UPB
(Russian: Самолёт СД-УПБ) Uvieliichennije Podvyesnije Baki (Increased Belly Tank), MiG-15bis tested with various external tank configurations. One such configuration of two 600 litres (160 US gal) tanks was made standard on the MiG-15bisS.
Samolyot SD-ET
(Russian: Самолёт СД-ЭТ) Prototype based on the MiG-15bis with multiple small improvements, including an ART-8 acceleration control unit, a PN-2FAK fuel-flow restrictor, increased wing stiffness, and improved drop tank jettisoning system. Some of the improvements became standard on production aircraft.
Samolyot SD-5
(Russian: Самолёт СД-5) Testbed for the ORO-57 rocket launcher on D3-40 pylons.
Samolyot SD-10
(Russian: Самолёт СД-10) Testbed for the PROSAB-100 anti-aircraft bomb on D4-50 pylons.
Samolyot SD-21
(Russian: Самолёт СД-21) Testbed for the S-21 rocket on D3-40 pylons
Samolyot SD-25
(Russian: Самолёт СД-25) Testbed for the PROSAB-250 cluster bomb on D4-50 pylons.
Samolyot SD-57
(Russian: Самолёт СД-57) Testbed for the ORO-57 rocket launcher on D4-50 pylons.
Samolyot SYa
(Russian: Самолёт СЯ) Experimental aircraft to study remedies for wing drop. Three were converted from MiG-15bis aircraft, with two being modified with stiffened wings and all three being fitted with bendable trim tabs.
Samolyot SR
(Russian: Самолёт СР) MiG-15bis modified for armed reconnaissance with the 37 mm and one 23 mm autocannon removed to make room for AFA-1M and AFP-21KT cameras. Also known as the Samolyot SR-1. Entered service as the MiG-15bisR.
Samolyot SP-1
(Russian: Самолёт СП-1) Prototype equipped with a Toriy-M radar in place of the two 23 mm cannons. Five converted from MiG-15bis aircraft.
Samolyot SP-2
(Russian: Самолёт СП-2) Prototype equipped with a Toriy-A radar in place of the two 23 mm cannons. Not to be confused with the MiG-17 variant of the same name.
Samolyot SP-5
(Russian: Самолёт СП-5) Prototype single-seat all-weather interceptor version of the MiG-15bis with an RP-1 Izumrud radar and a reduced armament of two NR-23 cannons. Also designated MiG-15bisP.
Samolyot SYe
(Russian: Самолёт СЕ) Experimental variant with an enlarged vertical tail and stiffened wings with square-tipped ailerons to improve high-speed handling. Also designated MiG-15LL.
Samolyot SL-5
(Russian: Самолёт СЛ-5) Testbed for the Klimov VK-5 engine. One converted from a MiG-15bis.
Samolyot SE
(Russian: Самолёт СЭ) Testbed new wingtips and vertical stabilizer to improve controllability.
Samolyot ST-1
(Russian: Самолёт СТ-1) Prototype two-seat trainer based on the MiG-15 (Samolyot SV), armed with a single 12.7 mm UBK-E machine gun and one NR-23 cannon.
Samolyot ST-2
(Russian: Самолёт СТ-2) Production two-seat trainer armed with a single 12.7 mm A-12.7 machine gun. Entered service as the UTI MiG-15.
Samolyot ST-7
(Russian: Самолёт СТ-7) Modified UTI MiG-15 with an RP-1 Izumrud radar and armed with a single 12.7 mm UBK-E. Entered service as the UTI MiG-15P.
Samolyot ST-8
(Russian: Самолёт СТ-8) Experimental variant to test the RP-3 Izumrud radar. One converted from a UTI MiG-15.
Samolyot ST-10
(Russian: Самолёт СТ-10) Testbed aircraft for ejection seats. At least five converted from MiG-15UTIs. Also designated UTI MiG-15LL.
Samolyot SDK-5
(Russian: Самолёт СДК-5) Radio-controlled target drones converted from retired MiG-15 and MiG-15bis aircraft. Not to be confused with the MiG-17 variant of the same name.
Samolyot SDK-7
(Russian: Самолёт СДК-7) Pre-programmed cruise missiles converted from retired MiG-15 and MiG-15bis aircraft.

=== Chinese variants ===
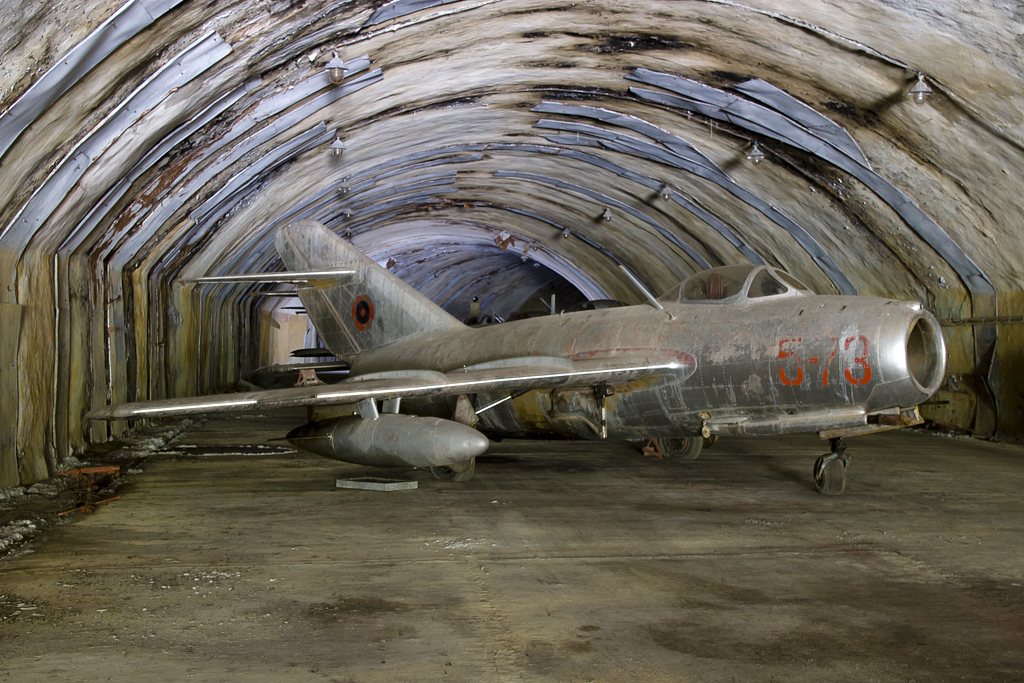
Former Albanian Air Force F-2 at Kuçovë Aerodrome

J-2
(Jianjiji – fighter) Chinese designation of USSR production MiG-15bis single-seat fighter. Plans to produce the J-2 in China were canceled in favor of the Shenyang J-5. Retired J-2s were exported under the designation F-2.
JJ-2
(Jianjiji Jiaolianji – fighter trainer) Chinese production of MiG-15UTI two-seat jet trainers. Retired JJ-2s were exported under the designation FT-2.
BA-5
Unmanned target drone conversions of J-2 fighters.

=== Polish variants ===
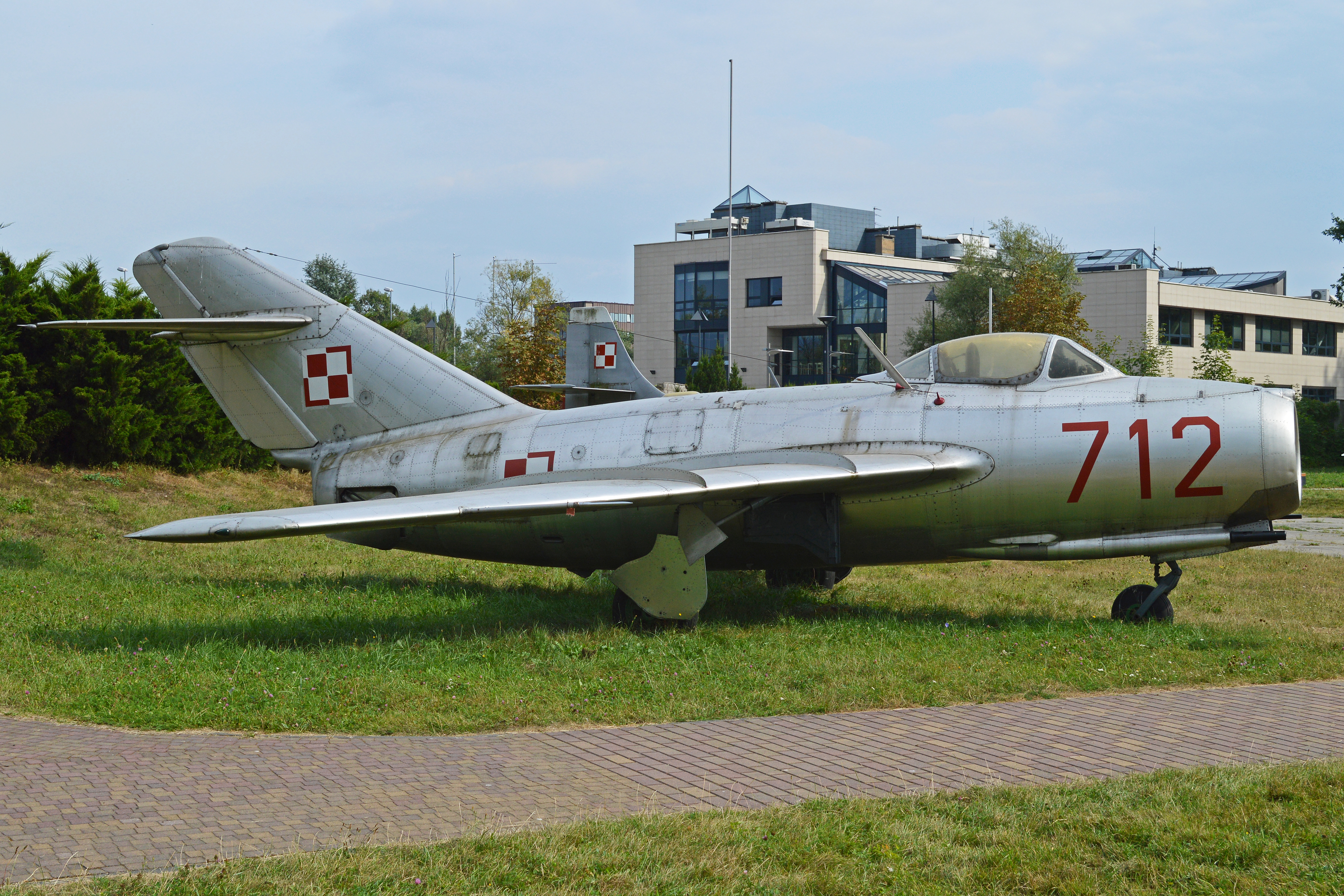
Lim-1 at the Polish Aviation Museum

Lim-1
(Licencyjny myśliwiec - licensed fighter aircraft) MiG-15 jet fighters built under license in Poland, powered by Lis-1 (licensed RD-45F). 227 built at WSK-Mielec factory from 1952 to 1954. The aircraft was given the product code Produkt C.
Lim-1.5
Unofficial designation of Lim-1s with avionics upgrades.
Lim-2
MiG-15bis built under license in Poland. 500 built from 1954 to 1956, with first 100 powered by Soviet-built VK-1A engines and remaining aircraft powered by Polish-built Lis-2 engines. The aircraft was given the product code Produkt CD.
Lim-2R
Polish-built reconnaissance conversion of Lim-2 with camera replacing the N-37 cannon.
SBLim-1
Polish Lim-1 converted to equivalent of MiG-15UTI jet trainers, with Lis-1 jet engines.
SBLim-1A
(originally SBLim-1Art): Conversion of SBLim-1 into two seat reconnaissance version with observer in rear seat.
SBLim-2
Polish Lim-2 or SBLim-1 converted to jet trainers with Lis-2 (VK-1) jet engines.
SBLim-2A
(originally SBLim-2Art): Conversion of SBLim-1 into two seat reconnaissance version with observer in rear seat.
SBLim-2M
Reconversion of SBLim-2A to trainer, with dual controls reinstated.
SBLim-2R
SBLim-2 converted for the reconnaissance role.

=== Czechoslovak variants ===
S-102
MiG-15 jet fighters built under license in Czechoslovakia, with Motorlet M-05 (licensed RD-45) engines.
S-103
MiG-15bis jet fighters built under license in Czechoslovakia with Motorlet M-06 (licensed VK-1) engines.
CS-102
MiG-15UTI jet trainers built under license in Czechoslovakia.
MiG-15SB
S-102 converted for the fighter bomber role with four additional pylons, for a total of six, for bombs and missiles. Takeoff from unpaved runways was aided by SRP-1 booster rockets, and a drogue parachute was fitted to the tail.
MiG-15T
S-102 converted for the target-towing role. All armament was removed.
MiG-15V
Towed target drone conversion.
MiG-15bisF
S-103 modified for unarmed reconnaissance with AFA-1M and AFP-21KT cameras similar to the Soviet MiG-15bisF.
MiG-15bisR
S-103 modified for armed reconnaissance similar to the Soviet MiG-15bisR. A AFP-21KT and two other cameras were carried, with the NFT-02 camera being used for night reconnaissance.

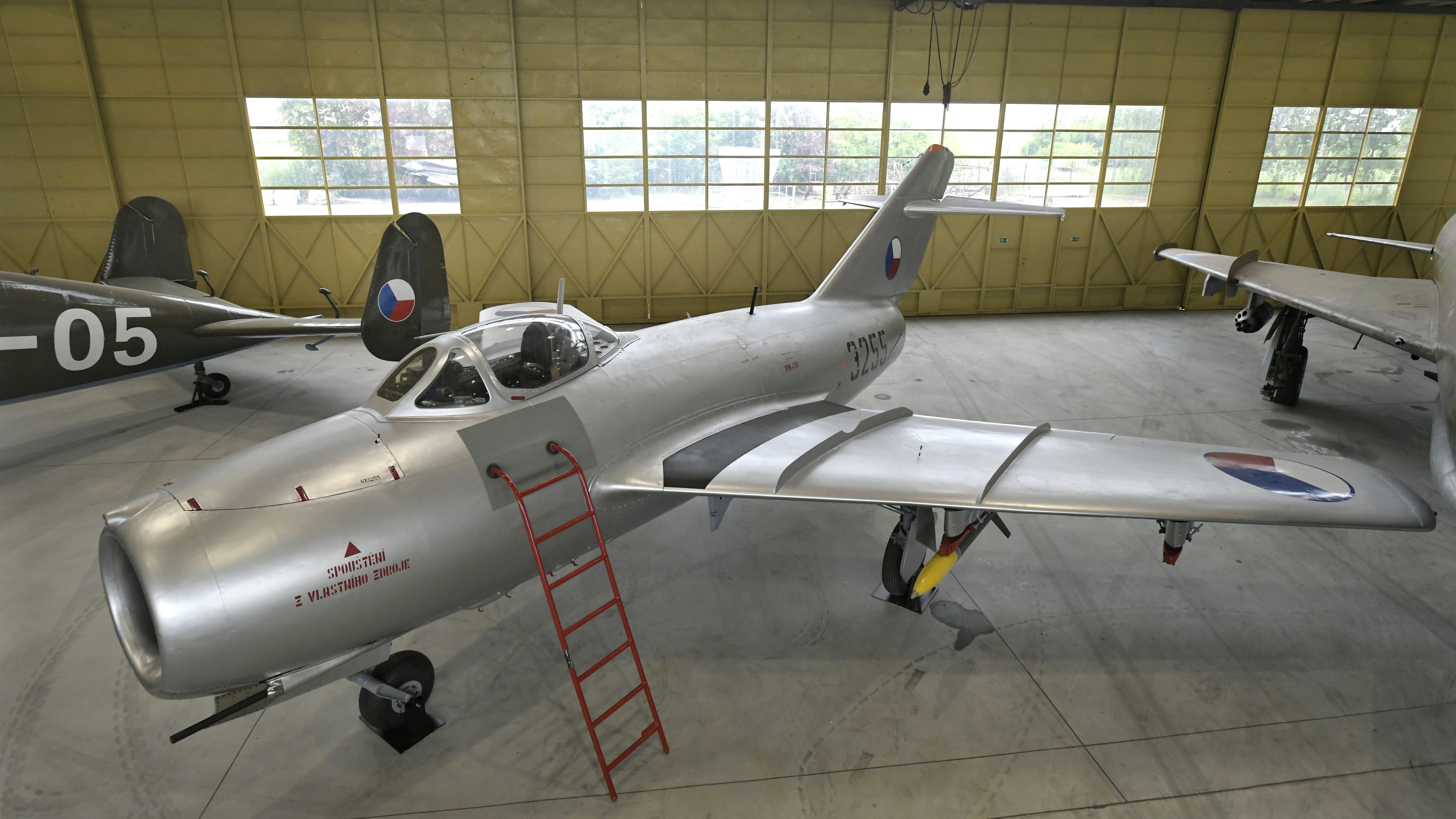
MiG-15bisSB at the Kbely Aviation Museum

MiG-15bisSB
S-103 converted for the fighter bomber role with the four additional pylons of the MiG-15SB, but without the rocket boosters and drogue parachute.
MiG-15bisT
S-103 converted for the target-towing role. All armament was removed.
UTI MiG-15P
Two-seat dual-control jet trainer, heavily modified by Aero to accommodate RP-1 or RP-5 Izumrud radar, making it almost identical to the Soviet Samolyot ST-8 except for radar type. Used for MiG-17PF (Fresco D) a MiG-19P/PM (Farmer B/E) crew training. One converted from a CS-102. Not to be confused with the similar Soviet UTI MiG-17P (Samolyot ST-7).

=== Bulgarian variants ===
UMiG-15MT
Conversion of single-seat fighters to two-seat trainers, from 1963.

=== Foreign reporting names ===
Fagot
The NATO reporting name for the single-seat MiG-15. After the introduction of the MiG-15bis, the reporting name of the original MiG-15 was changed to Fagot-A to differentiate the two variants.
Fagot-B
The NATO reporting name for the single-seat MiG-15bis.
Midget
The NATO reporting name for the two-seat MiG-15UTI.

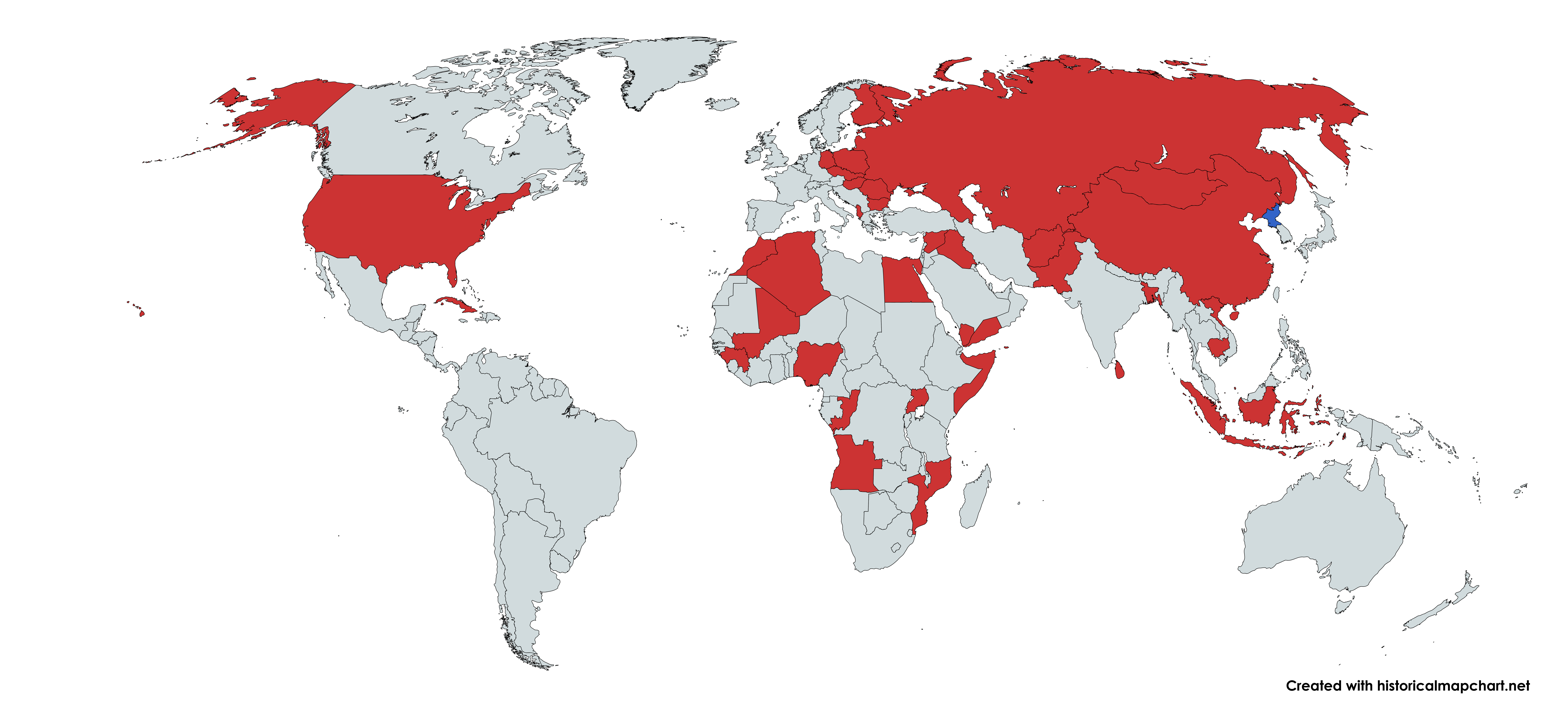
MiG-15 operators Current Former

== Operators ==
=== Current operators ===
North Korea

- Korean People's Army Air Force

=== Former operators ===
Afghanistan

- Afghan Air Force

Albania

- Albanian Air Force

Algeria

- Algerian Air Force

Angola

- People's Air and Air Defence Force of Angola

Bulgaria

- Bulgarian Air Force

Cambodia

- Royal Cambodian Air Force

China

- People's Liberation Army Air Force
- People's Liberation Army Naval Air Force

Republic of the Congo

- Congolese Air Force

Cuba

- Cuban Revolutionary Air and Air Defense Force

Czechoslovakia

- Czechoslovak Air Force

East Germany

- Air Forces of the National People's Army

Egypt

- Egyptian Air Force

Finland

- Finnish Air Force

Guinea

- Guinea Air Force

Hungarian People's Republic

- Hungarian People's Army Air Force

Indonesia

- Indonesian Air Force

Iraq

- Iraqi Air Force

Khmer Republic

- Khmer Air Force

Mali

- Malian Air Force

Morocco

- Royal Moroccan Air Force

Mongolia

- Mongolian People's Army Air Force

Mozambique

- Mozambique Air Force

Nigeria

- Nigerian Air Force

North Vietnam

- Vietnam People's Air Force

North Yemen

- North Yemen Air Force

Pakistan

- Pakistan Air Force

Poland

- Polish Air Force
- Polish Navy

Romania

- Romanian Air Force

Somalia

- Somali Aeronautical Corps

South Yemen

- South Yemen Air Force

Soviet Union

- Soviet Air Forces
- Soviet Air Defence Forces
- Soviet Naval Aviation

Sri Lanka

- Sri Lanka Air Force

Syria

- Syrian Air Force

Uganda

- Ugandan People's Defence Force Air Force

United States

- United States Air Force – In the 1980s, the United States purchased a number of Shenyang J-4s along with Shenyang J-5s from China via the Combat Core Certification Professionals Company; these aircraft were employed in a "mobile threat test" program at Kirtland Air Force Base, operated by the USAF's 4477th Test and Evaluation Squadron. As of 2015, MiG-15UTIs and MiG-17s are operated by a civilian contractor at both the USAF and US Naval Test Pilot Schools for student training.

Vietnam

- Vietnam People's Air Force

=== Civilian operators ===
Argentina
One ex-Polish Air Force CS-102 trainer variant, rebuilt in 1975 as a SB Lim2M and retired in 1987. Privately brought to Argentina in November 1997 and given the experimental registration LV-X216.

== Surviving aircraft ==
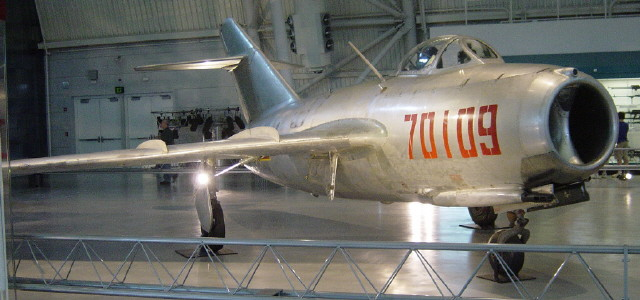
MiG-15 in National Air & Space Museum, taken in April 2004

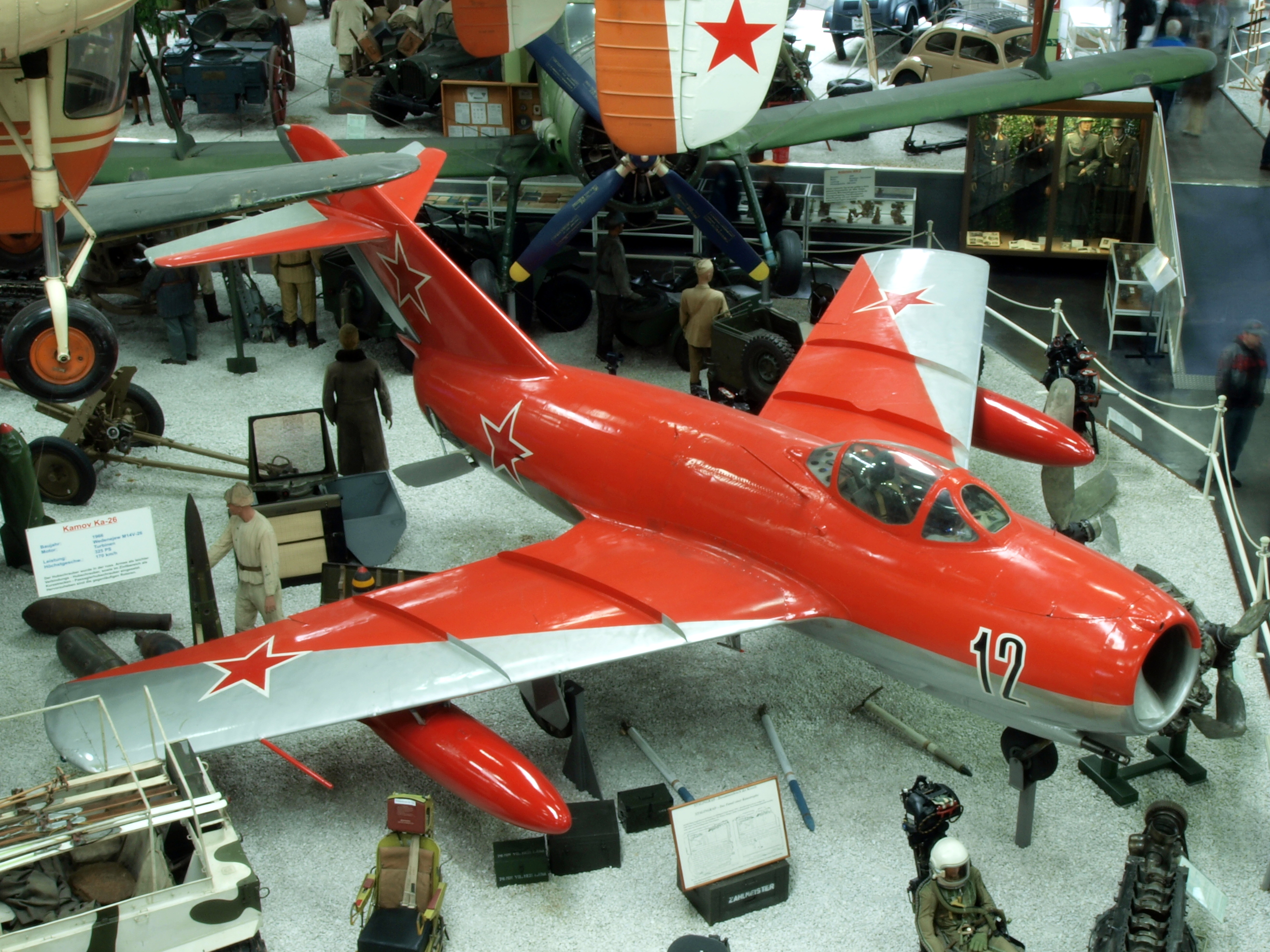
WSK-Mielec Lim-2 (Polish-built MiG-15bis, c/n 1B01006) at the Auto- und Technikmuseum Sinsheim

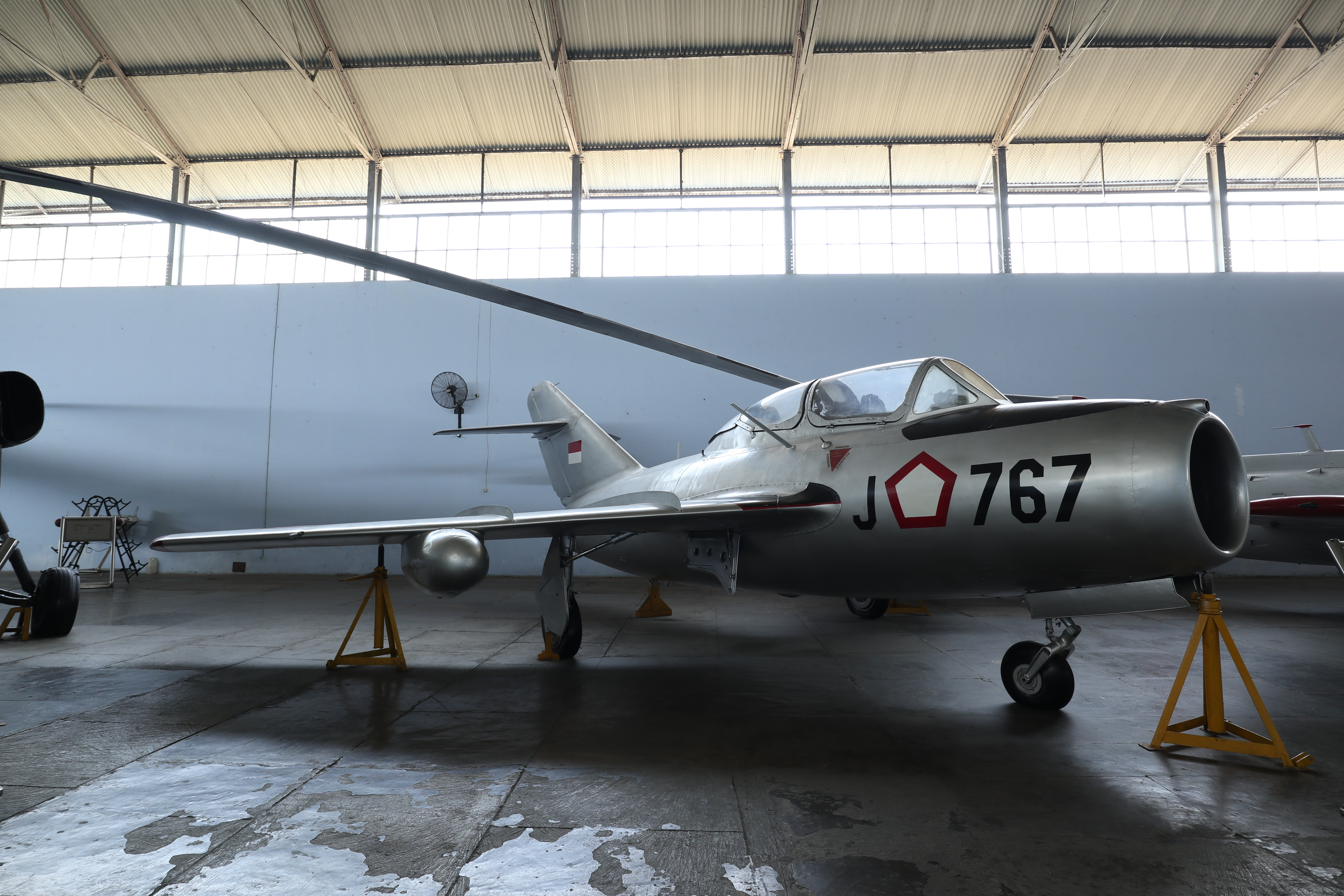
CS-102 (Czech-built MiG-15UTI) at Dirgantara Mandala Museum in Indonesia

Many MiG-15s are on display throughout the world. In addition, they are becoming increasingly common as private sport aircraft and warbirds. According to the FAA, there were 43 privately owned MiG-15s in the US in 2011, including Chinese and Polish derivatives, the first of which is owned by aviator and aerobatic flyer, Paul T. Entrekin.

Argentina

An airworthy MiG-15UTI, registration LV-X216, is on display at the Museo Nacional de Aeronáutica in Morón, Buenos Aires.

Australia
As of July 2015, six privately owned MiG-15s are airworthy and on the Australian civil aircraft register. At least seven others are on static display in museums, including one in the Australian War Memorial.

Bulgaria
One MiG-15 is on display in Sofia at the National Museum of Military History.

Canada

- A flying MiG-15UTI is operated at Region of Waterloo International Airport by Waterloo Warbirds.
- One WSK-Mielec Lim-2 (Polish-built MiG-15bis, c/n 1B00316) is on display at Canada Aviation and Space Museum.
- An Aero S-103 (Czechoslovak-built MiG-15bis in fighter-bomber SB variant, c/n 713133) is on display at Edenvale Airport near Edenvale, Ontario, Canada.

China
Several MiG-15s (including some in North Korean colours) are preserved at the China Aviation Museum outside Beijing.

Cuba
A MiG-15UTI of the FAR (Fuerza Aérea Revolucionaria) is displayed at the Museo del Aire.

Czech Republic

- In 2014 one two seat version of MiG-15 was restored into airworthy condition in Hradec Králové.
- One Aero S-102 (Czechoslovak-built MiG-15, c/n 231720, built 1953) is on display in Kbely Aviation Museum in Prague.

Finland

Three MiG-15UTIs survive:

- Päijänne Tavastia Aviation Museum in Lahti,
- Hallinportti Aviation Museum at Kuorevesi,
- Central Finland Aviation Museum in Jyväskylä.

The Finnish nickname of the aircraft was Mukelo ("Ungainly"), after the FinnAF aircraft type designation code MU.

France

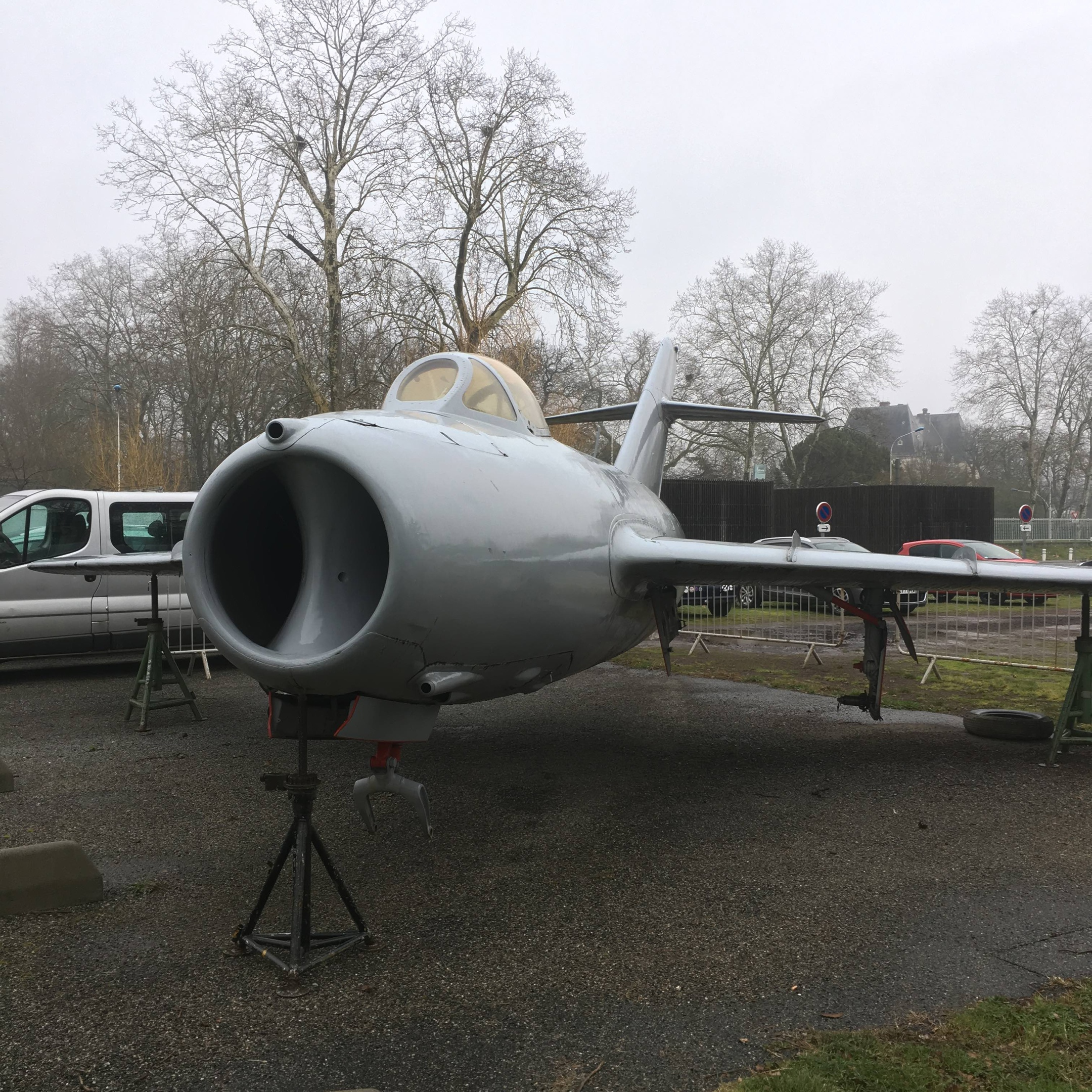
Mig-15bis at ISAE-SUPAERO in Toulouse, France

One MiG-15bis manufactured in Czechoslovakia is on display on the campus of the ISAE-Supaero school in Toulouse.

Indonesia

Three Aero CS-102 (Czechoslovak-built MiG-15UTI) are on display in Indonesia:

- J-754 - Halim Perdanakusuma Air Force Base, East Jakarta, Jakarta
- J-759 - Gedung Juang 45 Nganjuk, Nganjuk Regency, East Java
- J-767 - Dirgantara Mandala Museum, Sleman Regency, Special Region of Yogyakarta

Norway
MiG-15UTI "RED 18"

This aircraft is a SBLim-2 (Polish-built MiG-15UTI), produced by WSK-Mielec in 1952. The aircraft is operated by the Norwegian Air Force.

Poland

- FlyFighterJet.com offers a SBLim-2/MiG-15UTI for adventure flights in Poland
- A MiG-15 is parked adjacent to the terminal building at what is now Zielona Góra Airport, near Babimost, Poland, reflecting the former airport's military origins.
- MiG-15 and SBLim-2 are on display at the Museum of Polish Military Technology

Republic of Korea

MiG-15UTI on display at the War Memorial Museum in Seoul. This aircraft is a Chinese built MiG-15UTI flown by the DPRK.

Romania

A few Mikoyan-Gurevich MiG-15 are on display in Romania:

- 244, Mikoyan-Gurevich MiG-15bis, ex-FAR, at the Army Museum in Bucharest.
- 246, Mikoyan-Gurevich MiG-15, ex-FAR, at the Aviation Museum in Bucharest.
- 727, Mikoyan-Gurevich MiG-15, ex-FAR, at the Aviation Museum in Bucharest.
- 766, Mikoyan-Gurevich MiG-15, ex-FAR, is preserved at Ianca
- 2543, Mikoyan-Gurevich MiG-15UTI, ex-FAR, at the Aviation Museum in Bucharest.
- 2579, Mikoyan-Gurevich MiG-15UTI, ex-FAR, at the Aviation Museum in Bucharest.
- 2713, Mikoyan-Gurevich MiG-15bis, ex-FAR, at the Aviation Museum in Bucharest.
- Mikoyan-Gurevich MiG-15, in the front yard of Traian Vuia Lyceum in Craiova. Google maps coordinates 44.309248, 23.812195

Sweden

- WSK-Mielec Lim-2 (Polish-built MiG-15bis, c/n 1B00215) is displayed at Swedish Air Force Museum, Malmslätt-Linköping.

United Kingdom

- A WSK-Mielec Lim-2 (Polish-built MiG-15bis, c/n 1B01420) is displayed in North Korean colours at the Fleet Air Arm Museum.
- A WSK-Mielec Lim-2 (Polish-built MiG-15bis, c/n 1B01120) in Polish colours with red 1120 number is on display at Royal Air Force Museum Cosford.
- An Aero S-103 (Czechoslovak-built MiG-15bis in fighter-bomber SB variant, c/n 613677) in Czechoslovak colours is displayed at the National Museum of Flight, East Fortune, Edinburgh.

United States

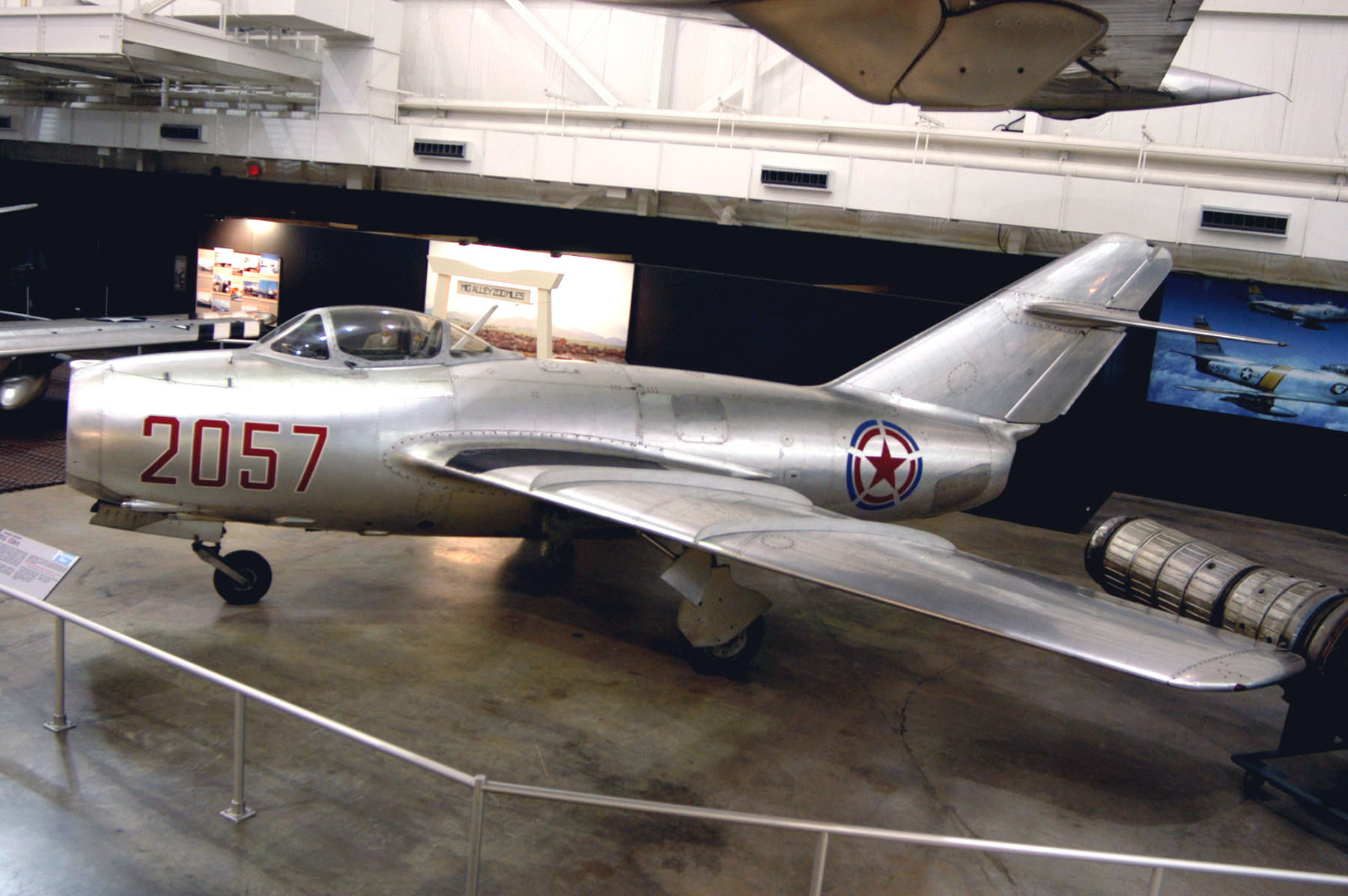
No Kum-sok's MiG-15 at the NMUSAF

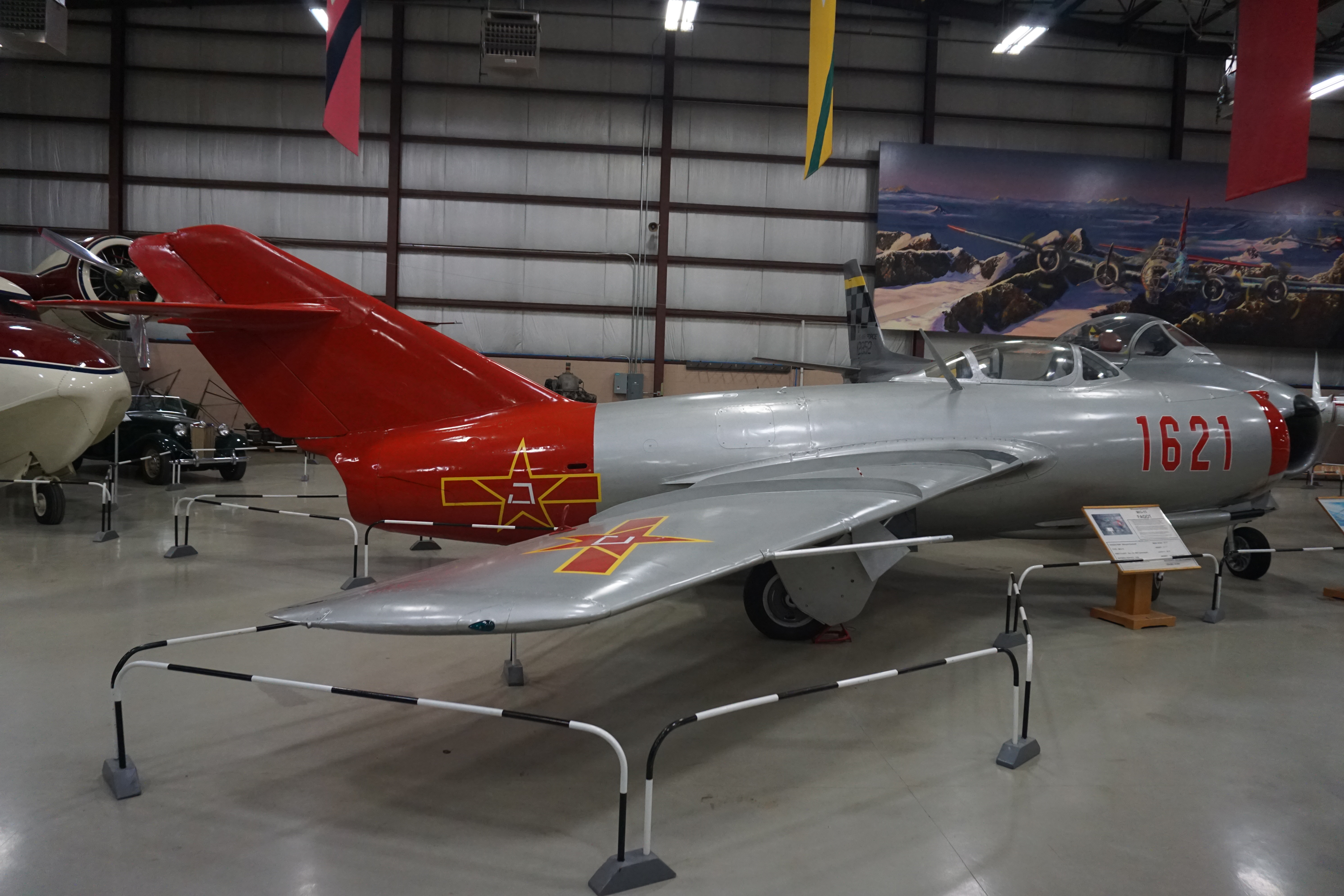
MiG-15 at the Air Zoo

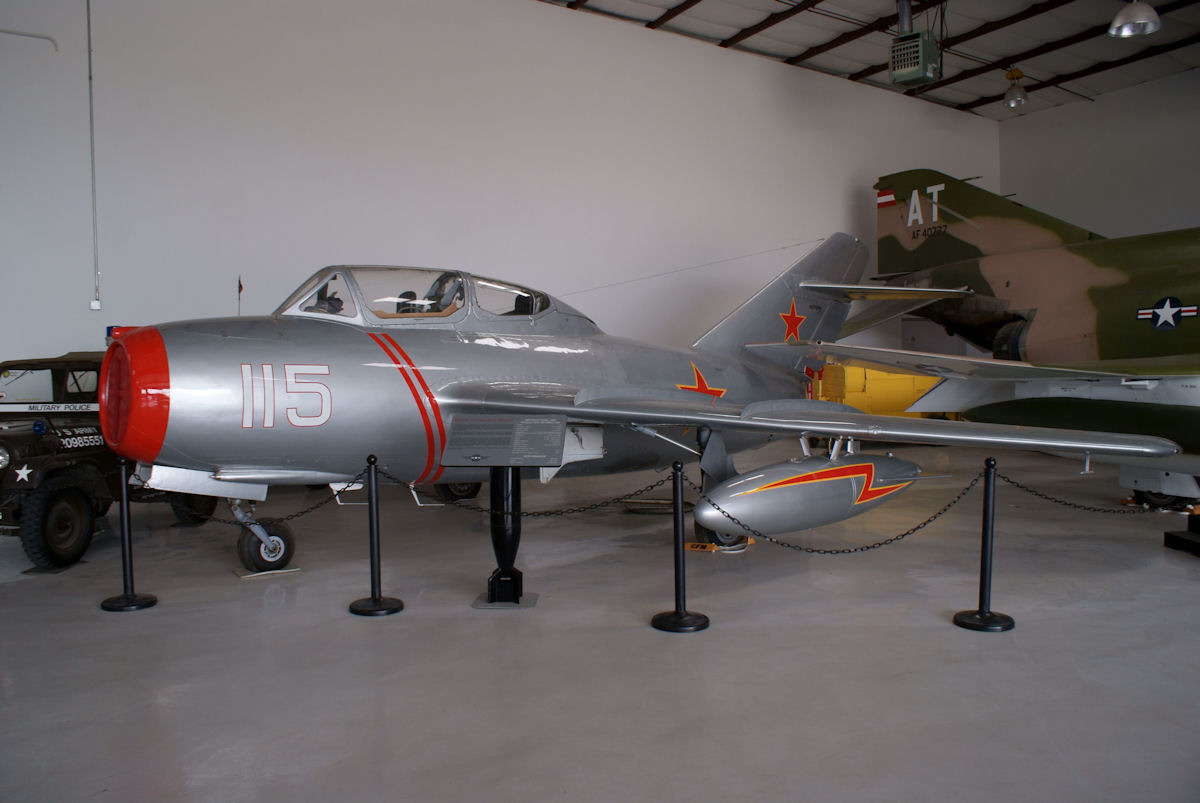
MiG-15UTI at the Cavanaugh Flight Museum

- A North Korean MiG-15 (c/n 2015357, "Red 2057") is on display at the National Museum of the United States Air Force in Dayton, Ohio. This is the aircraft flown to Kimpo Air Base in South Korea on 21 September 1953 by a defecting North Korean pilot who was given a reward of $100,000 (see above). The aircraft was repainted in USAF markings as "616" and flight-tested on Okinawa and then brought to the US to be returned to its "rightful owners" (believed to be the Soviet Union, which denied participating in the Korean War). When this offer was ignored, it was crated and shipped to Wright-Patterson Air Force Base in February 1954 and tested from March to October 1954 at Eglin AFB before returning to Wright-Patterson. Further evaluation continued until the aircraft was damaged in a hard landing in 1956, after which it was donated to the NMUSAF for restoration and display. It is on display in the museum's Korean War Gallery in its original North Korean colors.
- A MiG-15 is on display at the National Naval Aviation Museum, NAS Pensacola, Florida.
- A MiG-15 operated by the People's Liberation Army Air Force is on display at The Museum of Flight in Seattle, WA
- A MiG-15bis is on display at the Flying Leatherneck Aviation Museum located at Marine Corps Air Station Miramar in San Diego, California.
- A MiG-15bis, number 83227, undergoing restoration at the New England Air Museum, Bradley International Airport, Windsor Locks, CT.
- A WSK-Mielec Lim-2 (Polish-built MiG-15bis, c/n 1B01016) (FAA Reg. Number N15YY) is on display at the Combat Air Museum in Topeka, KS
- Two license-built MiG-15UTI are operated by Red Star Aviation - a WSK-Mielec SBLim-2 (Polish-built, c/n 1A03508, ex-Polish Air Force "358") on behalf of the US Naval Test Pilot School located at Patuxent River Naval Air Station and an Avia CS-102 (Czechoslovak-built, ex-Romanian AF) on behalf of the US Air Force Test Pilot School located at Edwards Air Force Base. These aircraft are used to train test pilots from the US and other nations sending students to the two schools.
- A MiG-15 is located at the Southern Museum of Flight, Birmingham–Shuttlesworth International Airport, Birmingham, Alabama.
- A Chinese version of the MiG-15bis is on display at the Steven F. Udvar-Hazy Center, Smithsonian National Air and Space Museum at Washington Dulles International Airport, Virginia
- A WSK-Mielec SBLim-2 (Polish-built MiG-15UTI, c/n 1A06027, ex-Polish Air Force "627") is on display at the Valiant Air Command Warbird Museum, Titusville, Florida
- A WSK-Mielec SBLim-2 (Polish-built MiG-15UTI, c/n 1A03506, ex-Polish Air Force "306") is on display at the Minnesota Air National Guard Museum, Minneapolis–St. Paul International Airport, Minnesota
- A MiG-15 is on static display at the Commemorative Air Force Museum in Mesa, Arizona
- North Korean MiG-15 "079" under restoration at Palm Springs Air Museum, Palm Springs, California
- A MiG-15 is on display at the Naval Air Station Wildwood Aviation Museum at Cape May airport in Cape May, New Jersey
- Soviet built MiG-15bis serial #2292 built in 1954 and supplied to China as a J-2 is on indoor display at the Oakland Aviation Museum Oakland, California.
- 2 MiG-15s, in flyable condition at Western Sky Aviation Warbird Museum in St. George, Utah.
- A WSK-Mielec Lim-2 (Polish-built MiG-15bis, c/n 1B01621, ex-Polish Air Force "1621") is on display at the Air Zoo in Kalamazoo, Michigan.

== Specifications (MiG-15bis) ==
MiG-15 drawing

Data from OKB Mikoyan, MiG: Fifty Years of Secret Aircraft Design

General characteristics

- Crew: 1
- Length: 10.102 m (33 ft 2 in)
- Wingspan: 10.085 m (33 ft 1 in)
- Height: 3.7 m (12 ft 2 in)
- Wing area: 20.6 m^{2} (222 sq ft)
- Airfoil: root: TsAGI S-10; tip: TsAGI SR-3
- Empty weight: 3,681 kg (8,115 lb)
- Gross weight: 5,044 kg (11,120 lb)
- Max takeoff weight: 6,106 kg (13,461 lb) with 2x600 L (160 US gal; 130 imp gal) drop-tanks
- Fuel capacity: 1,420 L (380 US gal; 310 imp gal) internal
- Powerplant: 1 × Klimov VK-1 centrifugal-flow turbojet, 26.5 kN (5,950 lbf) thrust

Performance

- Maximum speed: 1,076 km/h (669 mph, 581 kn) at sea level

1,107 km/h (688 mph; 598 kn) / M0.9 at 3,000 m (9,800 ft)

- Maximum speed: Mach 0.87 at sea level
- Cruise speed: 850 km/h (530 mph, 460 kn) Mach 0.69
- Ferry range: 2,520 km (1,570 mi, 1,360 nmi) at 12,000 m (39,000 ft) with 2x600 L (160 US gal; 130 imp gal) drop-tanks
- Service ceiling: 15,500 m (50,900 ft)
- Rate of climb: 51.2 m/s (10,080 ft/min)
- Wing loading: 296.4 kg/m^{2} (60.7 lb/sq ft)
- Thrust/weight: 0.54

Armament

- Guns:
  - 2 × 23 mm Nudelman-Rikhter NR-23 autocannon in the lower left fuselage (80 rounds per gun, 160 rounds total)
  - 1 × 37 mm Nudelman N-37 autocannon in the lower right fuselage (40 rounds total)
- Hardpoints: 2 , with provisions to carry combinations of:
  - Bombs: 100 kg (220 lb) bombs
  - Other: drop tanks, or unguided rockets

== See also ==
- Boeing B-29 Superfortress
- Clement Attlee
- Stafford Cripps
- Artem Mikoyan

Related development

- Mikoyan-Gurevich MiG-17
- Raduga KS-1 Komet

Aircraft of comparable role, configuration, and era

- Arsenal VG 70
- Canadair Sabre
- Dassault Ouragan
- FMA IAe 33 Pulqui II
- Grumman F9F Panther
- Hawker P.1052
- Lavochkin La-15
- McDonnell F2H Banshee
- North American F-86 Sabre
- Saab 29 Tunnan
- Supermarine Attacker
- Yakovlev Yak-30 (1948)

Related lists

- List of military aircraft of the Soviet Union and the CIS
- List of fighter aircraft
