= Albany, Alabama =

- Albany Heritage Neighborhood Historic District
- U.S. National Register of Historic Places
- U.S. Historic district
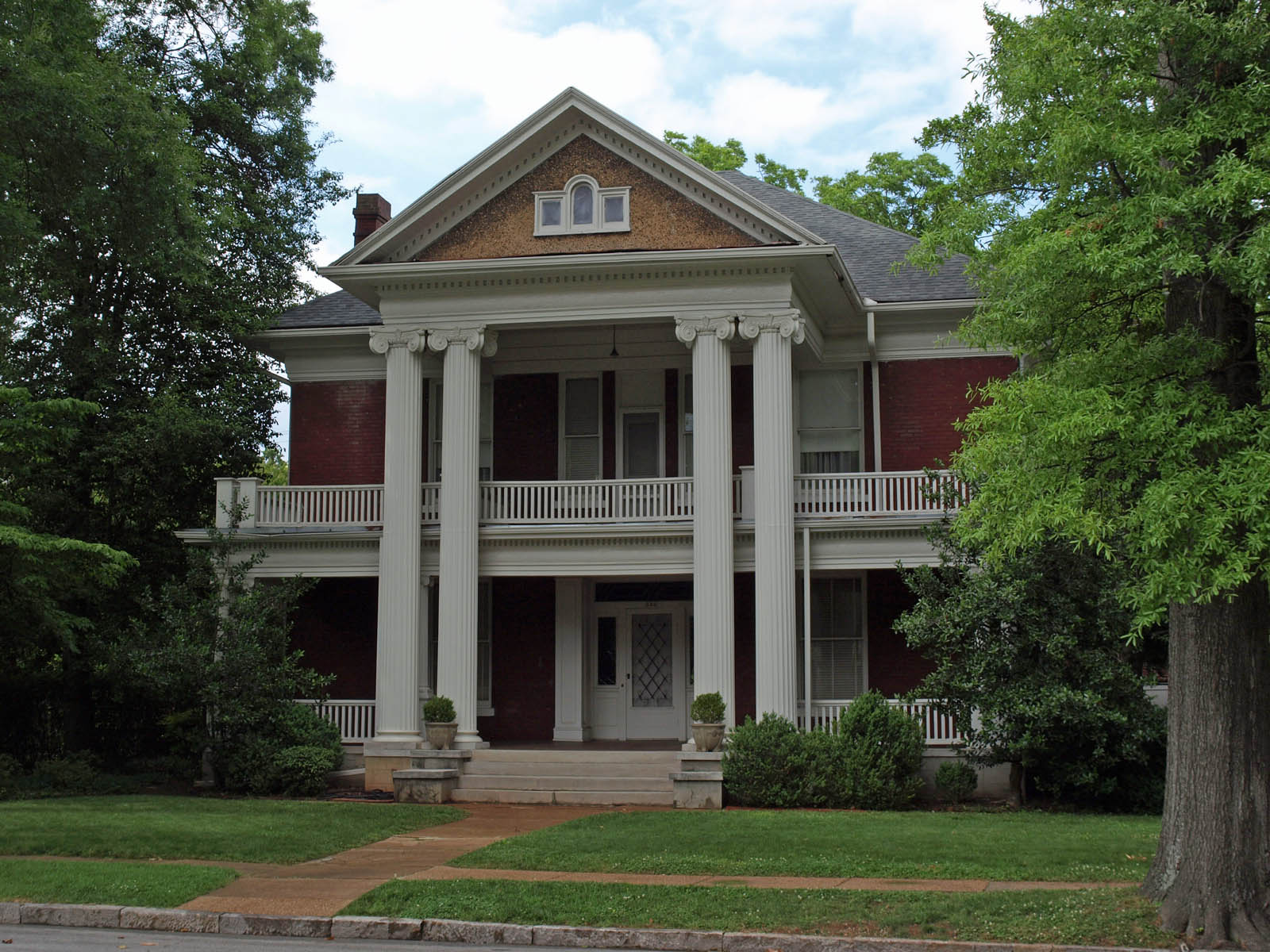
- Neal-Wiley House at 646 Jackson Street, 2013

- Location within Alabama Location within the United States
- Location: Roughly bounded by Gordon Dr., Summerville Rd., Jackson, 8th, Moulton, 6th, and 4th Aves., Decatur, Alabama
- Coordinates: 34°36′0″N 86°58′40″W
- Built: 1887
- Architectural style: Bungalow/Craftsman, Late Victorian
- NRHP reference No.: 83002981
- Added to NRHP: February 3, 1983

Albany, Alabama, also known as New Decatur, Alabama, was a city in Morgan County, Alabama, United States, situated immediately to the southeast of the city of Decatur near the Tennessee River. New Decatur/Albany existed as a city from 1887 until 1927, when it merged with the city of Decatur. Today, it exists as a neighborhood within the city of Decatur, and is on the National Register of Historic Places.

== History ==
During the American Civil War, the important transportation hub of Decatur, Alabama often changed hands between the Union and the Confederacy. Eventually, the entire city (except for three buildings) fell victim to the war and burned to the ground during the Battle of Decatur. Just as the city was coming back to life, a yellow fever epidemic swept the area in 1878, causing the population of the community to dwindle to approximately 400 by 1880.

On January 11, 1887, as Decatur was still rebuilding from the destructive results of the war and the outbreak, the Decatur Land Improvement and Furnace Company, Inc., founded by Eugene C. Gordon, C.C. Harris, and W.W. Littlejohn, invested $7.5 million toward 5,600 acres (2,300 ha) of land southeast of the city. The company formed a new city as a means of reinventing Decatur as a manufacturing and transportation center following the war. They named their new city New Decatur and gave it the nickname "The Chicago of the South," referencing its status as a transportation hub, and as a marketing tool toward Midwesterners. New Decatur was designed as a planned community with the help of famed landscape architect Nathan Franklin Barrett. The company set aside 100 acres (40 ha) of this land for churches and schools and established what is known today as Delano Park, an oddly-shaped stretch of parkland designed to break the monotony of an urban-like street grid. New Decatur's charter was confirmed by the Alabama State Legislature on February 18, 1889.

The company advertised this new development across the Northeast and Midwestern United States as "the healthiest city in the South," following the installation of a modern water and drainage system, which was thought to ward off disease. The new city saw an initial boom, but slowed soon after due to deteriorating economic conditions. Eventually, though, because of the city's industries and quality of life, many Americans began to move south to New Decatur and inhabit the city. In an effort to mend fences and avoid favoritism toward one region of the United States or another, streets in New Decatur were named in honor of generals from both the Union (Grant and Sherman) and Confederate (Johnston and Jackson) Armies.

Though New Decatur was built to complement, not compete with, the existing city of Decatur (by then called "Old Decatur"), the influx of "Northerners" angered many residents of the existing city. As a result, hostility between inhabitants of Old Decatur and New Decatur began to surface as wounds from the Civil War were still healing. In 1916, the need to ease these rivalries led New Decatur to adopt the new name of Albany, giving it an identity completely separate from Old Decatur. The city's residents nominated the name in honor of Albany, New York. By this time, the cities of Albany and Old Decatur had formed a major metropolitan area with an estimated population of 8,000.

Eventually, the hostilities between the two cities began to die down, and the need for a common bridge over the Tennessee River united them. On August 28, 1923, a measure to consolidate the two cities failed due to tax inequities. On February 4, 1927, the two cities finally merged into one, taking the original name of Decatur.

== Today ==
The evidence that two cities once existed on the site is strong. The street layouts are vastly different, and most of the original street names still exist. As a result, duplicate street names persist throughout modern Decatur and can cause confusion for drivers.

Both cities' business districts remain in existence less than a mile apart and form modern Decatur's sprawling downtown area. Much of the original turn of the 20th century architecture of the two cities still exists as well, and both Old Decatur and Albany each have neighborhood historical associations charged with maintaining and promoting their separate histories. In addition, the two areas of town still maintain moderately distinct cultures. As Decatur has continued to expand to the south and west (and become more modern in the process), the Albany and Old Decatur neighborhoods stand out as the city's historic core.

The historic Albany neighborhood was listed on the National Register of Historic Places on February 3, 1983.

== Demographics ==
=== City of New Decatur/Albany (1890-1920) ===
Historical population
Census	Pop.	Note	%±
1890	3,565		—
1900	4,437		24.5%
1910	6,118		37.9%
1920	7,652		25.1%
U.S. Decennial Census

Albany first appeared on the 1890 U.S. Census as the incorporated city of New Decatur. It continued to report as New Decatur until its name change in 1916. It reported lastly as Albany in 1920 before its merger with the city of Decatur in 1927. From 1900-1920, New Decatur/Albany was the 12th largest city in Alabama.

=== New Decatur/Albany Precinct (1900–1920) ===
Historical population
Census	Pop.	Note	%±
1900	5,169		—
1910	7,153		38.4%
1920	9,212		28.8%
U.S. Decennial Census

The New Decatur-19th Precinct of Morgan County first appeared on the 1900 U.S. Census. The precinct name changed on the 1920 census to Albany to reflect the name change of the city. The 19th precinct merged with the Decatur-1st Precinct effective with the 1930 U.S. Census.

== Photo gallery ==
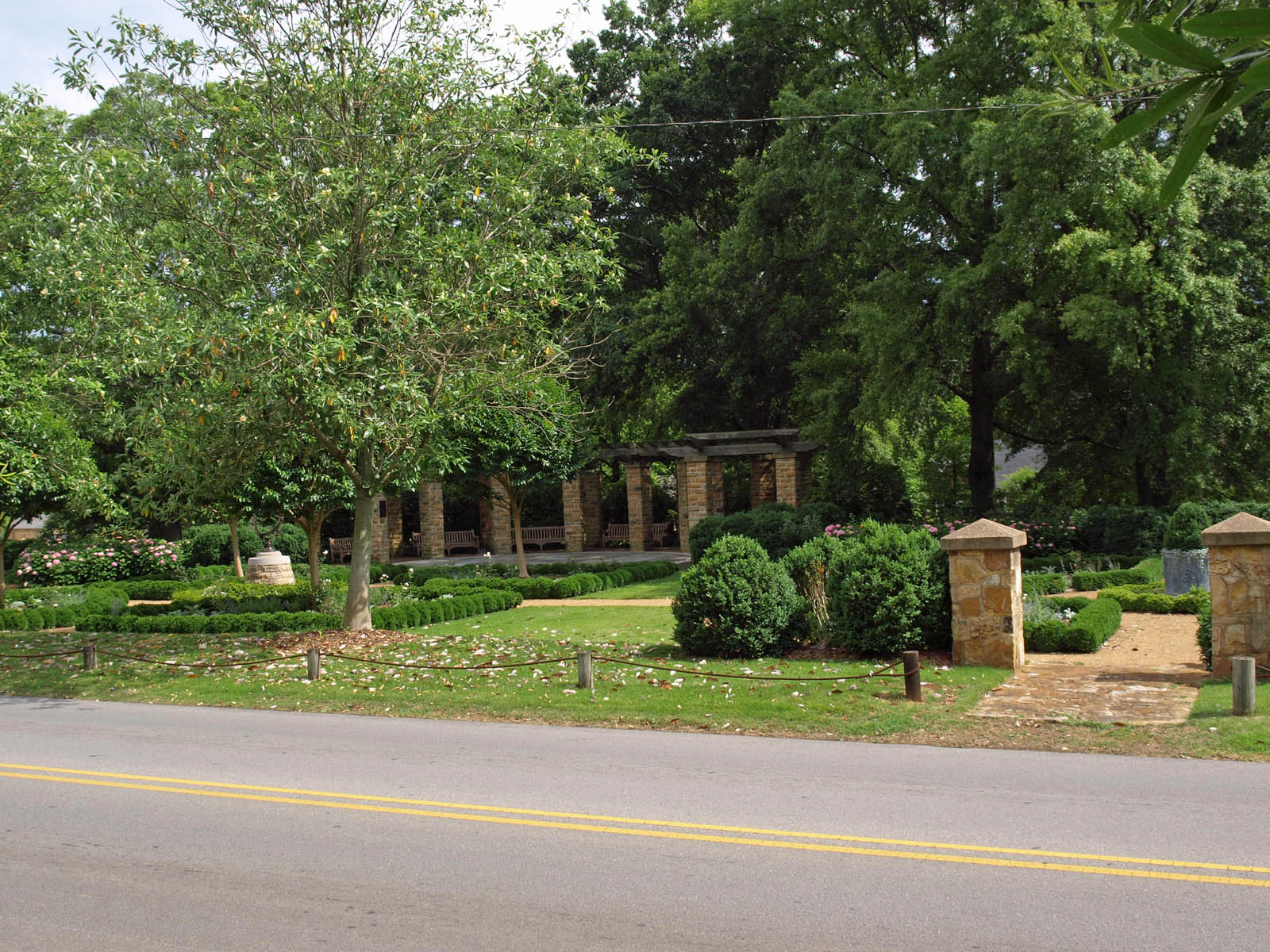
Delano Park Rose Garden

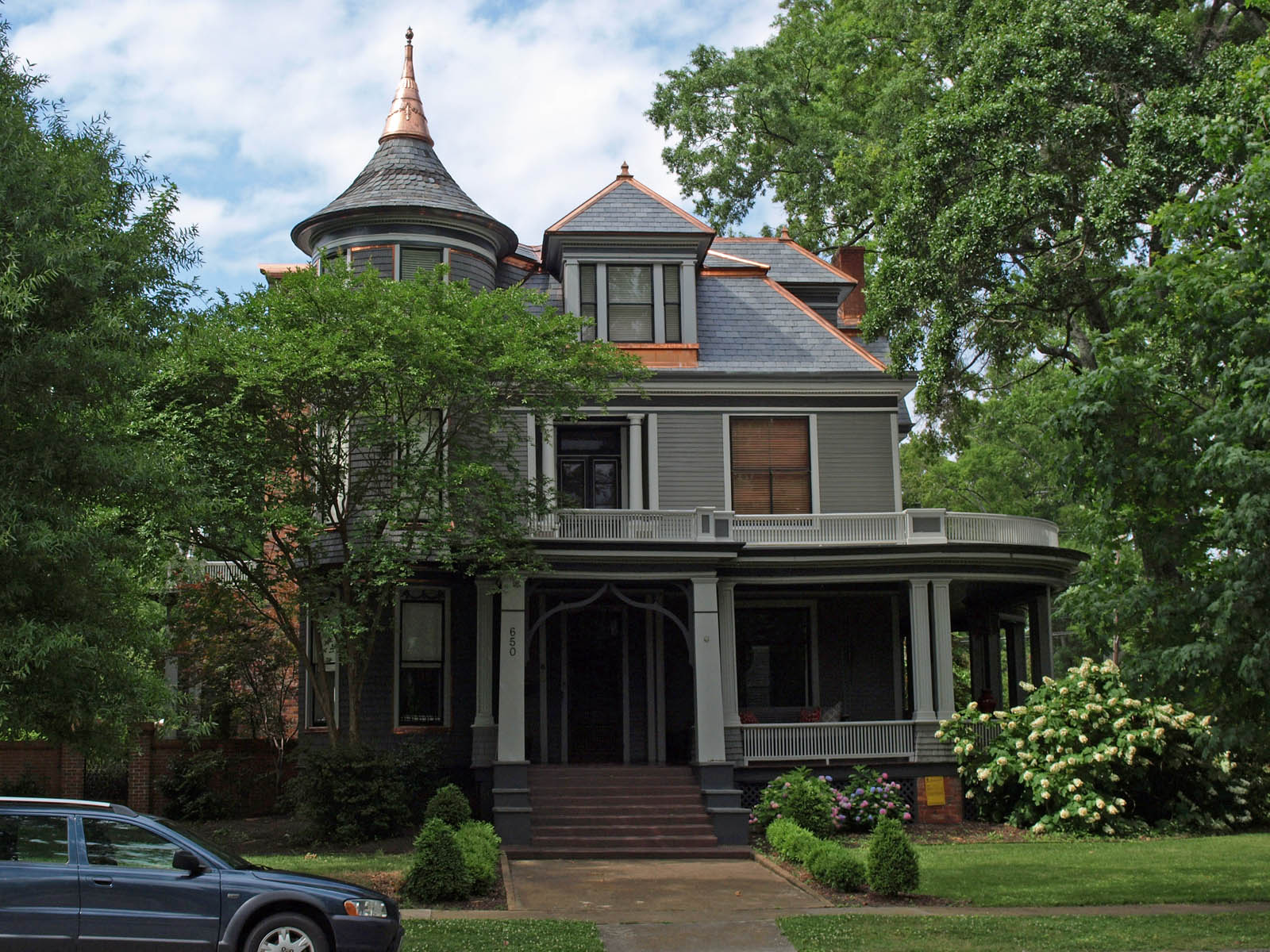
Borton-Chenault House

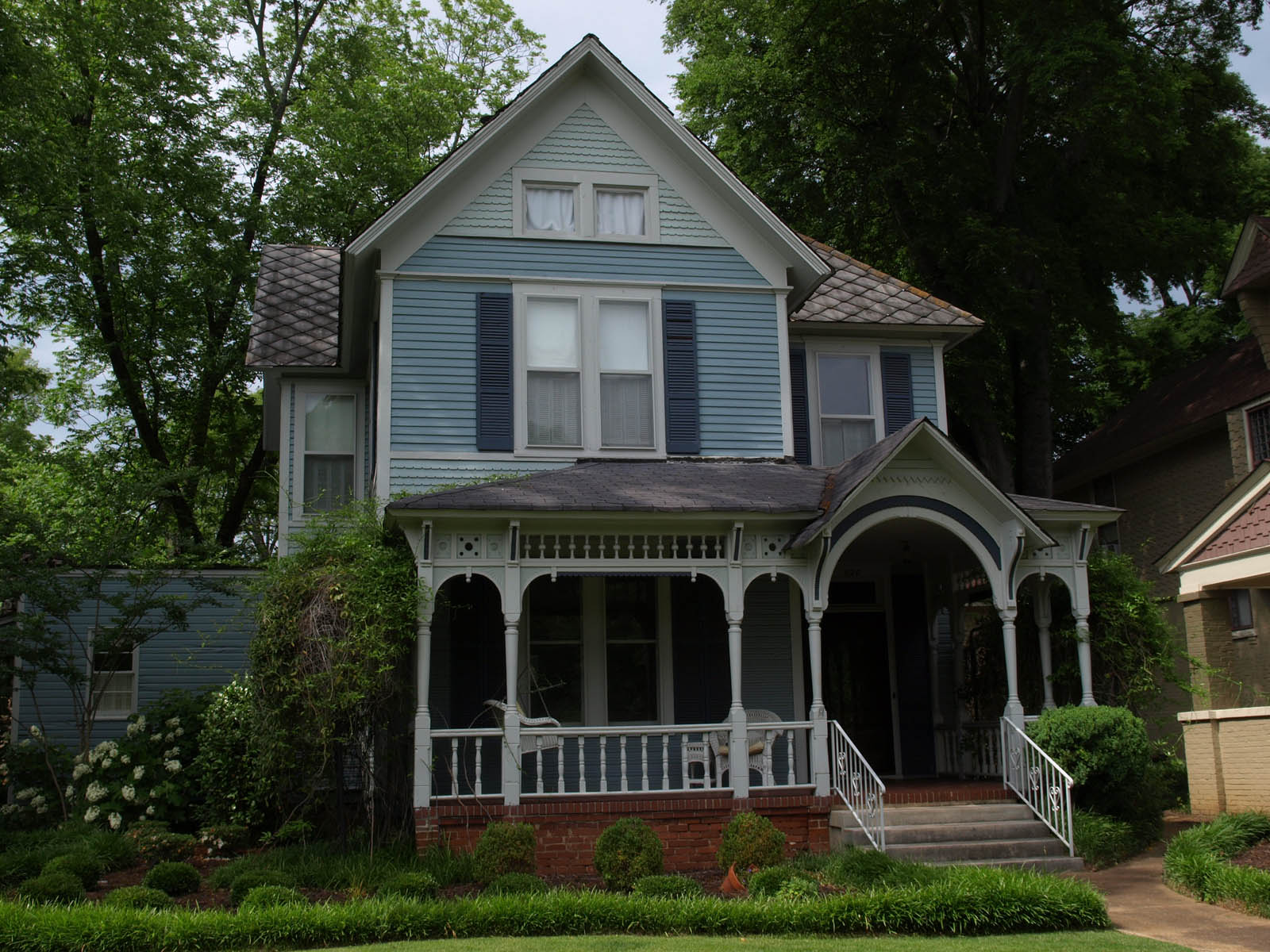
Maury House

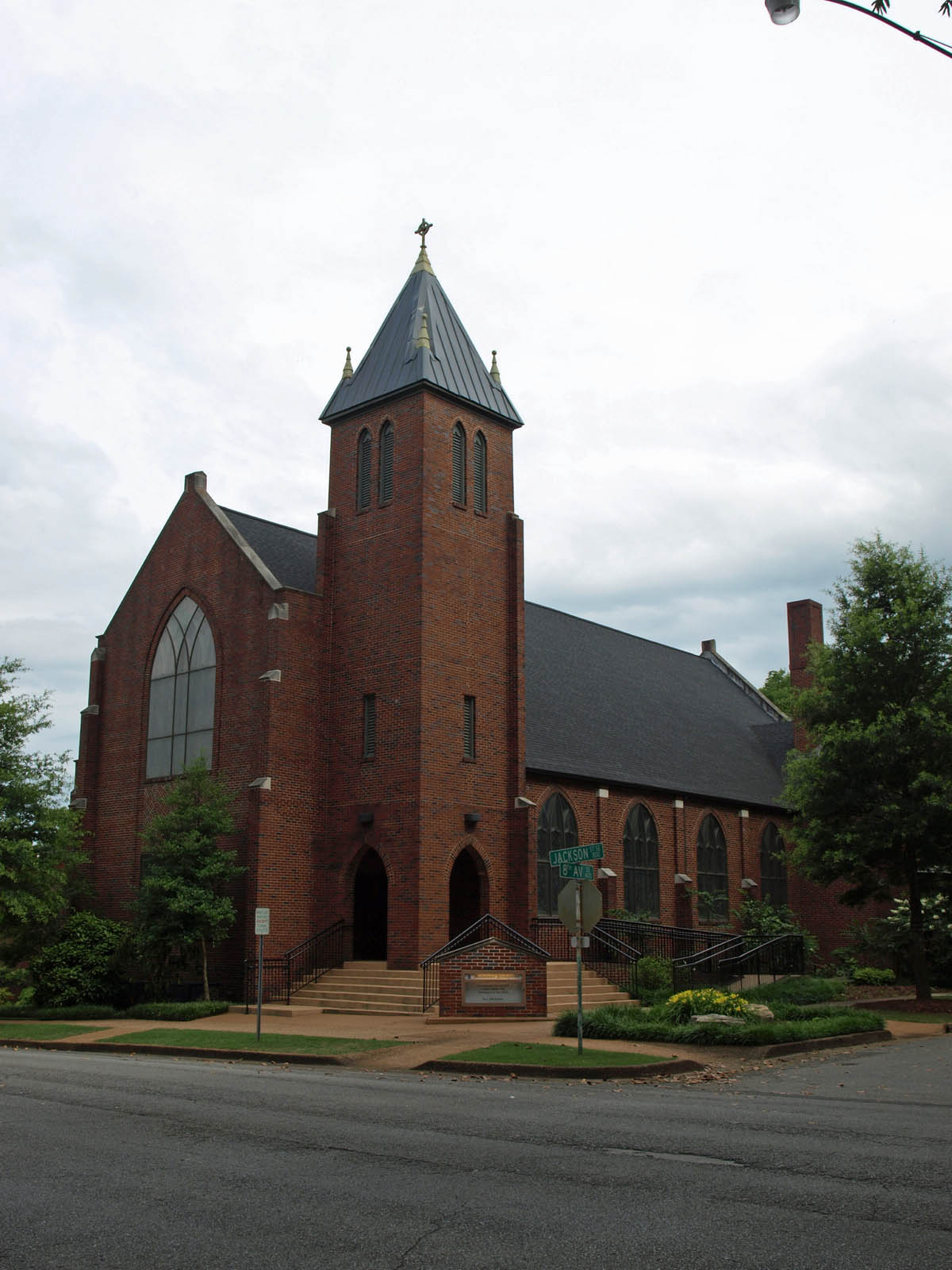
Westminster Presbyterian Church-Decatur

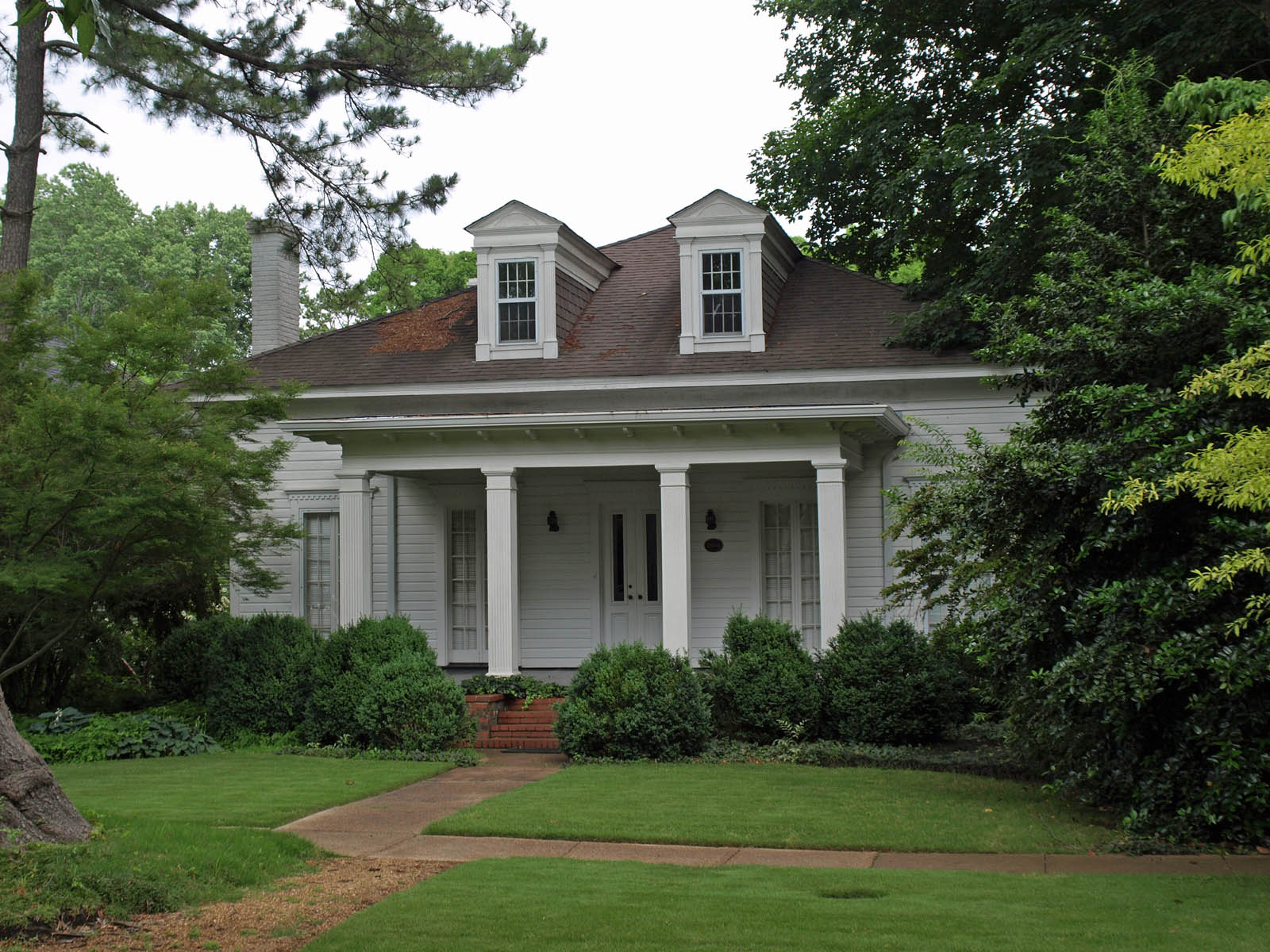
Kelly House

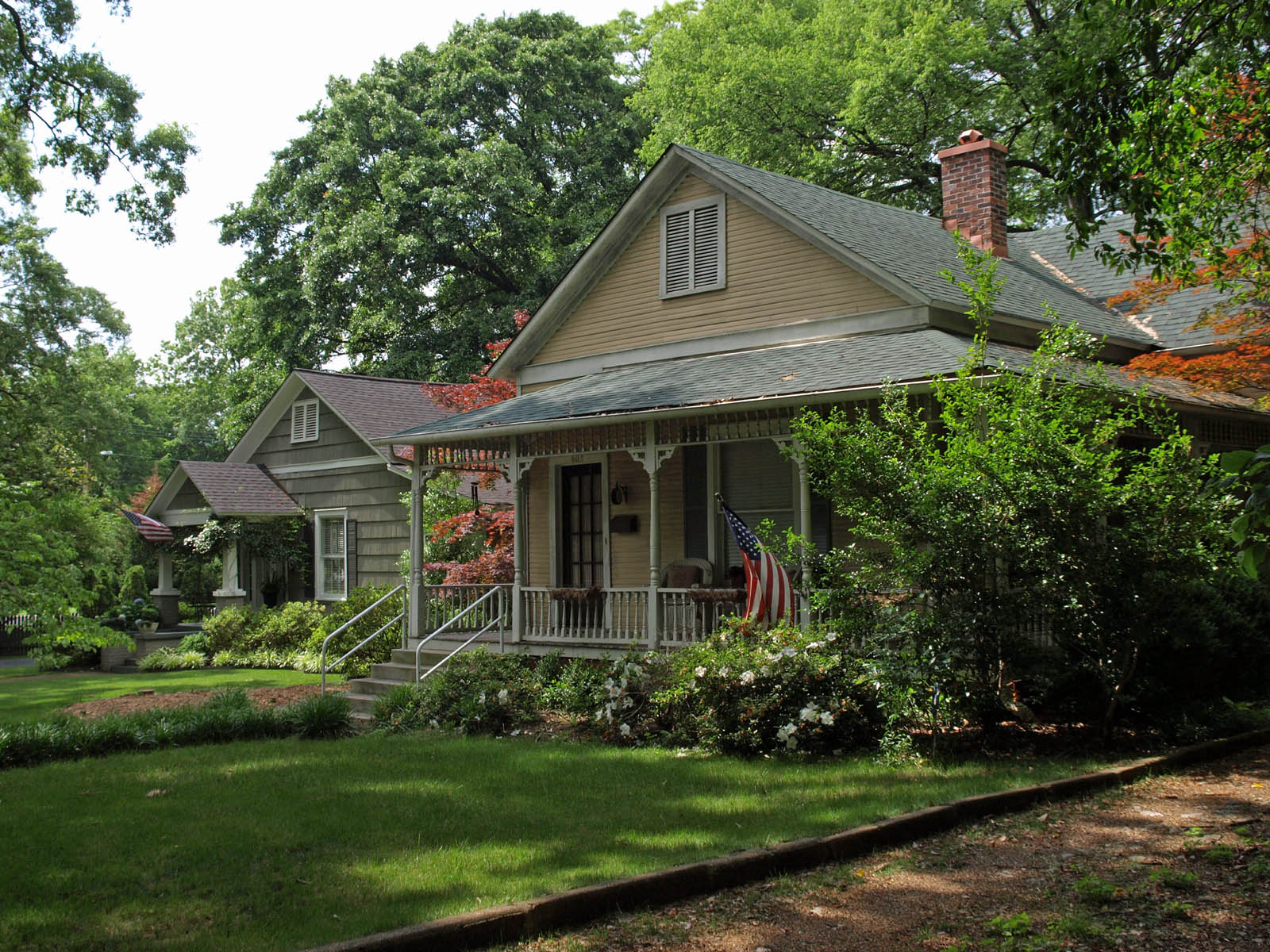
Gordon-Davidson House

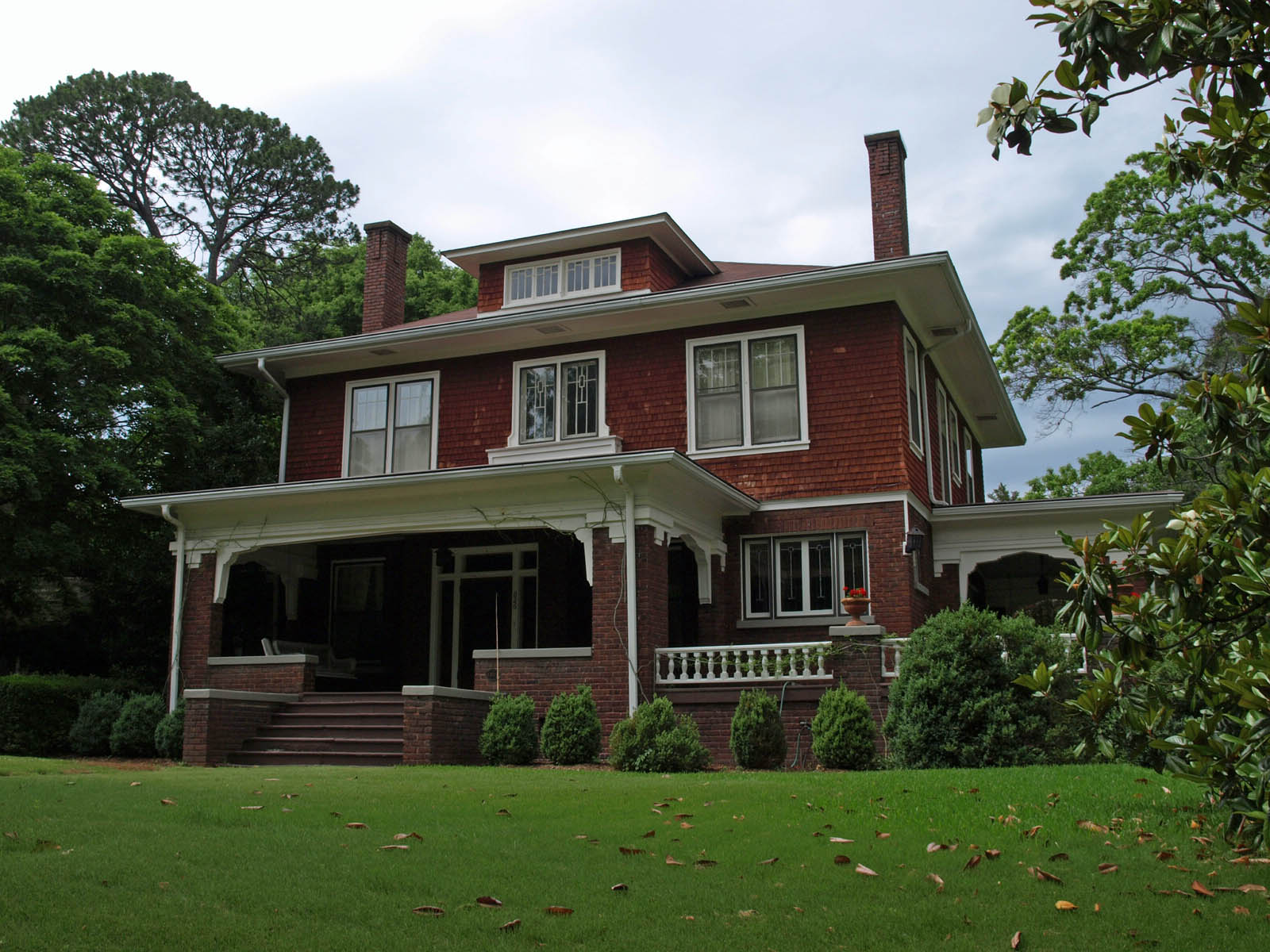
House at 626 Gordon Street
