= Eugene Gordon =

Eugene Gordon may refer to:

- Eugene Gordon (writer) (1891–1972), Harlem Renaissance writer, painter, and publisher
- Eugene Andrew Gordon (1917–2002), American federal judge
- Eugene I. Gordon (1930–2014), American physicist
- Eugene C. Gordon, railroad construction engineer and Confederate officer in the Civil War

== See also ==
- Eugene Gordon Lee (1933–2005), American child actor
