= Alabama Jubilee =

Alabama Jubilee may refer to:

- Alabama Jubilee Hot Air Balloon Classic
- Mobile Bay jubilee, a periodic natural summer phenomenon wherein sea life comes near shore
- "Alabama Jubilee" (song), by Jack Yellen
