= Delano Park =

Park in Alabama, United States

Coordinates: 34.597°N 86.975°W

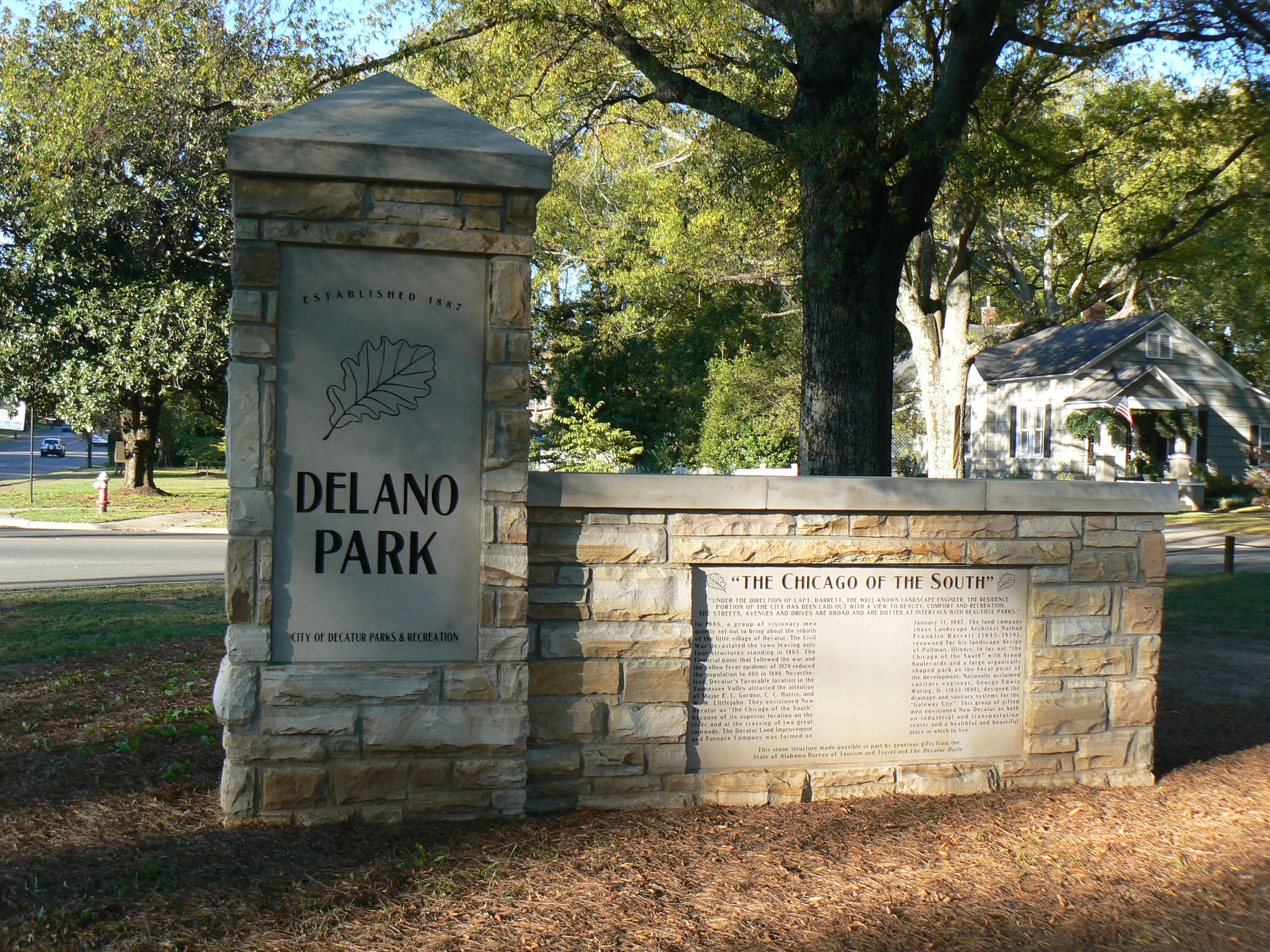
Stone "Delano Park" sign

The Delano Park, operated by the Decatur Parks and Recreation Board, is the oldest park in the city of Decatur, Alabama.

It was created in 1887, as part of a master plan to "re-invent" the City of Decatur, then New Decatur. The city created the "Decatur Land Improvement and Furnace Company" for this specific purpose. The company employed a landscape architect by the name of Nathan Franklin Barrett to design a whole new city that had been ravaged by a yellow fever epidemic and the Civil War. The park was designed to be the focal point of the entire plan.

The park, named after President Franklin Delano Roosevelt's mother, was dedicated in the 1930s by Roosevelt himself and later named in her honor as part of a newspaper contest, which sought to commemorate his vision for municipal parks across America. The land was donated to the city of Albany as part of the New Deal, which included a large plan to develop the poverty-ridden city.

The park remained mostly a solitary attraction on the fringe of downtown as the only large park in town during that era. This changed in the mid-1950s when the new Decatur High School constructed a new school building to replace an overcrowding "Riverside" High School building.

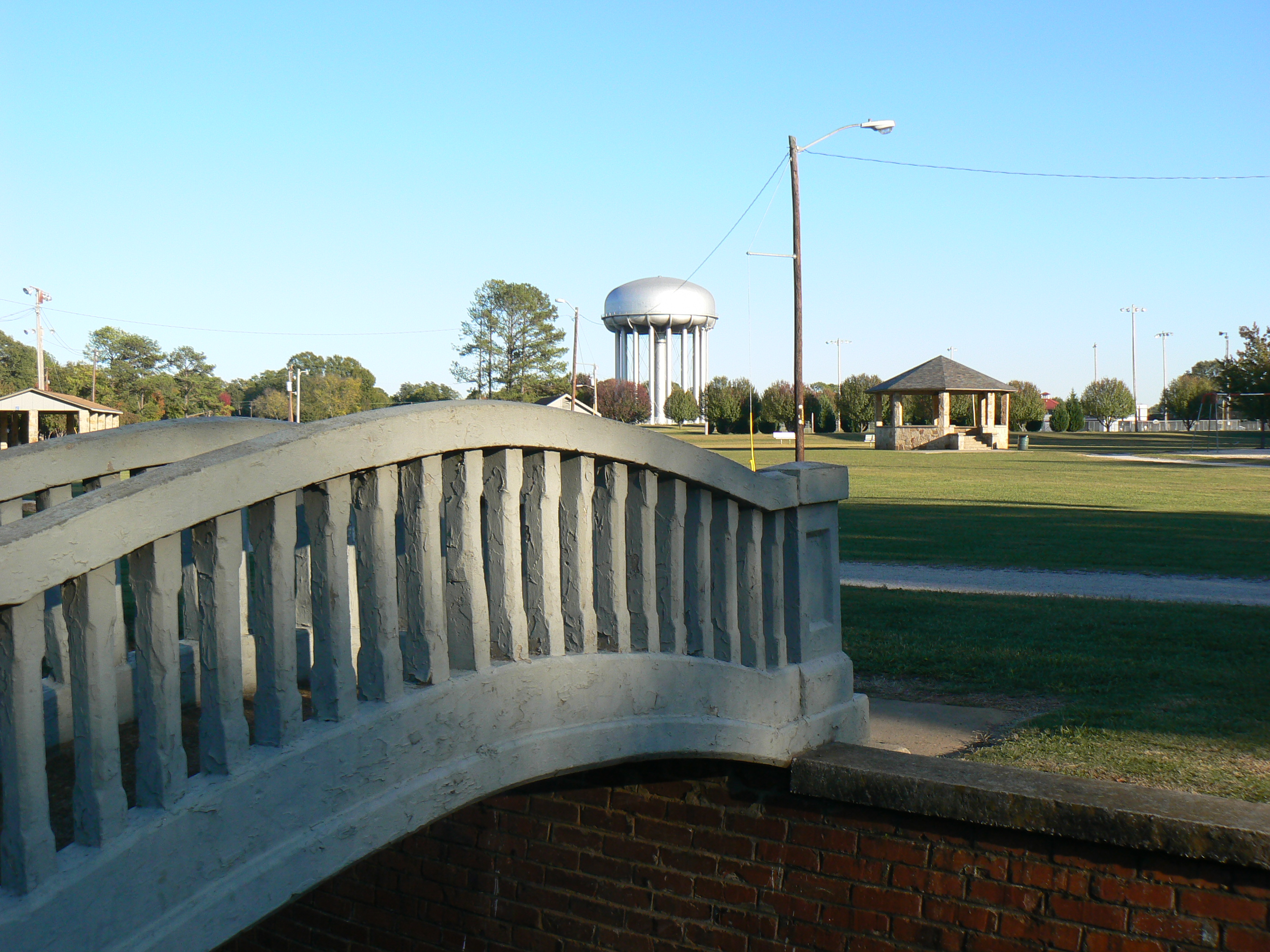
Stone bridge crossing drainage ditch

The far eastern end once consisted of a swimming pool called the "Blue Haven". This pool has since been filled in, and the Decatur High marching band now uses a practice field that was created over the former swimming area.

The middle portion of the park contains a children's playground, the new "Splash Pad", and a ditch with a concrete bridge donated to the park. The bridge was moved in the 1930s from Ferry Street to accentuate the beauty of the park and has been a favorite location for young and old alike ever since.

== Splash Pad ==
The "Splash Pad" was built as a part of a large plan to revitalize the whole of Delano Park. It was installed during 2006 and first became available for use in the summer of 06'. It features numerous jets and sprayers that issue water from both the walls and floor of the pad. The floor is a large scale map of the State of Alabama, it maps the main rivers and largest cities in the state, including Birmingham, Montgomery, Huntsville, Mobile, and Decatur.

== Revitalization of Delano ==
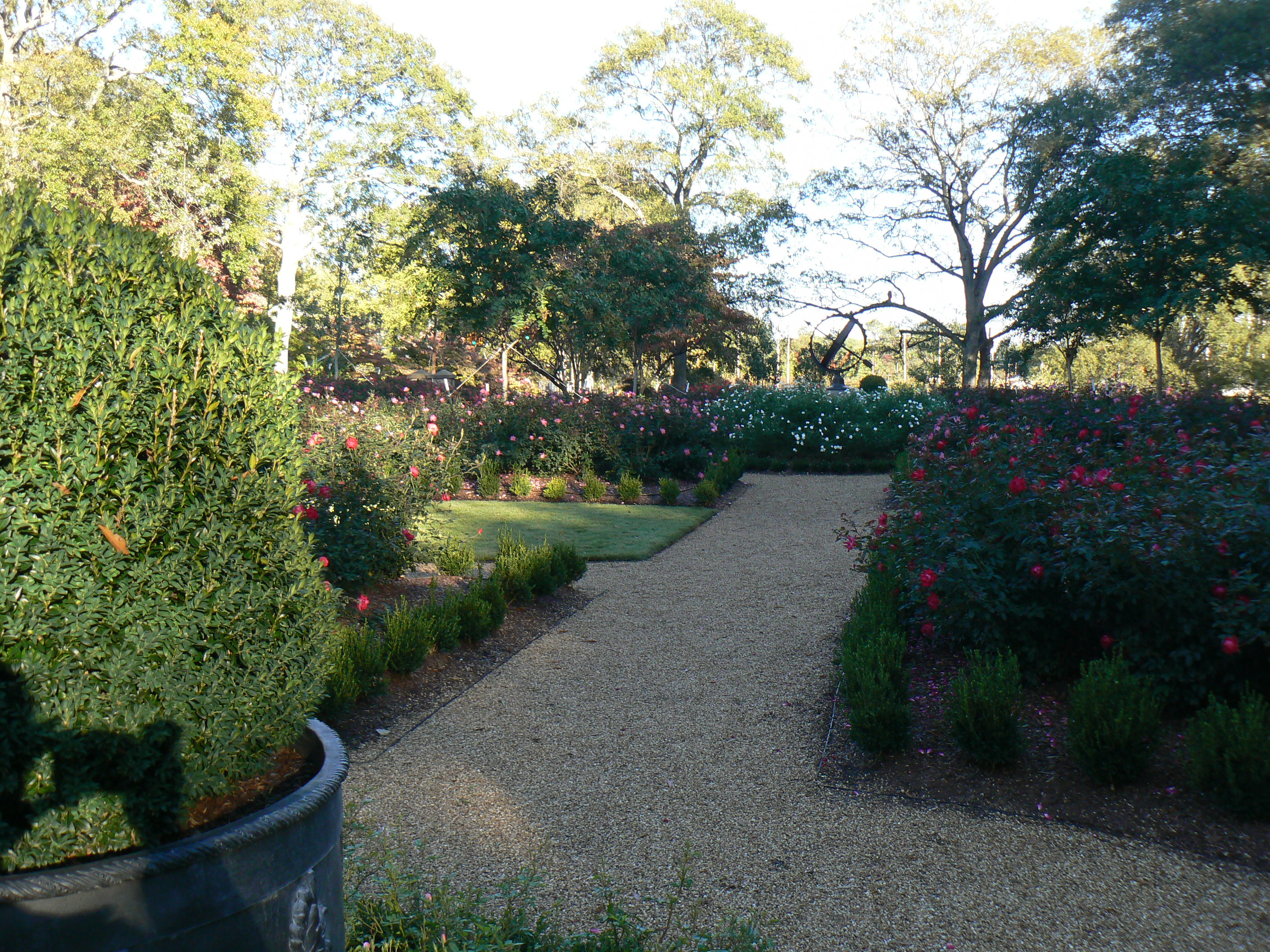
Delano Park Rose Garden

Plans are currently underway to create many more attractions for the park. The group, "Friends of Delano," are leading an effort to add historical trails, gardens, higher levels of safety, and a way to connect the western portion with the middle portion of the park. So far, funding is in order, and the attractions are in the planning stage.

The historic "Delano Rose Garden" was re-created between the years of 2005 and 2006 as an exact restructuring of the former rose garden that once stood as part of the original Delano plan. The garden had been non-existent for decades but was finally rebuilt in junction with the revitalization.

The need for a way to connect the western portion to the middle portion is a high priority for the city. 6th Avenue (US 31) successfully cuts the park in two, effectively depriving the western portion of much needed attention. A historical trail has been built, beginning in the eastern portion, traveling through the middle portion and eventually connecting with the western portion in an attempt to spur more foot traffic throughout the park. The trail also intends to allow for a safer crossing of 6th Avenue as it is one of the busiest streets inside the city.

== See also ==
- Decatur, Alabama
- Decatur High School
