= Spirit of America Festival =

The Spirit of America Festival is an outdoor Fourth of July celebration typically held over a period of two days at Point Mallard Park in Decatur, Alabama. Featuring a variety of traditional summer activities, the event is organized and staged by an all-volunteer board.

The major highlights of the festival are presentations of two special awards given to notable citizens: the Audie Murphy Patriotism Award and the Barrett C. Shelton Freedom Award, the latter named after the locally revered Decatur Daily publisher whose family still controls the newspaper, as well as one of North Alabama's largest aerial fireworks displays.

== History ==
The Spirit of America Festival began in 1967 in response to the growth of anti-Vietnam War protests throughout the United States. The largely conservative citizens of Decatur decided to show their support for the servicemen and servicewomen in Vietnam and to promote patriotism among citizens by presenting an annual Fourth of July event.

Over 10,000 people gathered at Ogle Stadium, a football field at Decatur High School, for the first Spirit of America Festival. By the early 1970s, it was held at Delano Park, a municipal facility located across the street from Decatur High.

In 1970, a Miss America and Miss Alabama preliminary pageant was added to the festival's lineup, Miss Spirit of America, along with family games, musical performances, and other special events. In 1976, the Spirit of America Festival relocated, in time for the U.S. Bicentennial that year, after an outdoor stage was constructed at Point Mallard Park, owned and operated by the City of Decatur since 1970 and a tourist attraction in its own right, adding further appeal to visitors from outside the area. The pageant title was changed to "Miss Point Mallard" from 1976 through 2013. In 2014, the pageant moved for its final years to the Princess Theatre Center for the Performing Arts in downtown Decatur and resumed the "Miss Spirit of America" name. Due to declining interest in beauty pageants throughout America, the event was discontinued in the late 2010s.

Air Force Captain Gerald O. Young, in his first speech given since receiving the Medal of Honor for heroism in Vietnam, directed a great tribute to the "American Soldier" to a gathering of over 20,000 people.

In 1984, President Ronald Reagan, then seeking reelection, addressed a crowd of over 60,000 people at that year's festival. At the time, the City of Decatur only had between 40,000 and 50,000 residents, meaning there were more people who attended the presidential speech than actually lived in the city.

COVID-19 pandemic concerns caused the entirety of the 2020 Festival, even the fireworks display, to be canceled; the 54th Festival took place in 2021, with safety measures in place.

== Special Events ==
The Audie Murphy Patriotism Award is named in honor of America's most decorated soldier from World War II, and Medal of Honor recipient, Audie Murphy. Murphy, who was scheduled to be the guest speaker at the 1971 Spirit of America Festival, died in a plane crash just two months prior to the Festival. The award is now presented annually to an "outstanding American patriot" or "an outstanding group of individuals who most exemplify the true 'Spirit of America.'"

Past recipients of the Audie Murphy Patriotism Award include Vietnam Prisoner of War Charles J. Plumb, Brigadier General Hallett D. Edson, General Omar Bradley, Alabama Governor George C. Wallace, U.S. Senator James B. Allen, U.S. Senator John Sparkman, U.S. astronaut John Young, Olympic track star Jesse Owens (a native of neighboring Lawrence County, Alabama), entertainer Johnny Cash, U.S. Representative Bob Jones, Secretary of State Alexander Haig, Vietnam veteran and U.S. Senator Jeremiah A. Denton, U.S. Senator Strom Thurmond, Iranian hostage Charles C. Scott, actor Gerald McRaney, and U.S. Admiral Donald Whitmire.

The Barrett C. Shelton Freedom Award was established in 1980 in honor of local newspaper publisher Barrett C. Shelton, Sr., one of the founders of the Festival. The award is presented annually to honor an Alabamian for outstanding service to his or her community and state. Notable past recipients of the Shelton Award include Henry Eugene "Red" Erwin, U.S. Senator Howell Heflin, and U.S. Representative Ronnie Flippo.

In 1994, the H.J. Heimlich Humanitarian Award was added to the honors presented at the Spirit of America Festival. The plaque is presented to an individual or group who has saved or attempted to save another human being's life, or an individual or group who has significantly added to the betterment of all people. Dr. H.J. Heimlich was the first recipient, followed by the United Service Organizations.

The "Miss Spirit of America" pageant (known as "Miss Point Mallard" from 1976 through 2013) was one of the many preliminary pageants in the Miss America scholarship program. The winner of the pageant advanced to the Miss Alabama pageant, along with receiving a variety of scholarship opportunities, gift certificates, and prizes.

An amateur golf tournament also bears the Spirit of America name and is loosely tied with the annual proceedings. However, the tournament is conducted at a country club in far southeastern Decatur, near Priceville, not at the Point Mallard public golf course.
