= Mandisa Stevenson =

American basketball player (born 1982)

Personal information
- Born: February 4, 1982 (age 44) Decatur, Alabama
- Listed height: 6 ft 3 in (1.91 m)
- Listed weight: 166 lb (75 kg)

Career information
- High school: Decatur (Decatur, Alabama)
- College: Gulf Coast CC (2000–2002); Auburn (2002–2004)
- WNBA draft: 2004: undrafted
- Position: Power forward / center

Career history
- 2004: San Antonio Silver Stars
- 2005: Seattle Storm
- 2006: Phoenix Mercury
- Stats at Basketball Reference

Mandisa Stevenson (born February 4, 1982) is an American professional women's basketball player with the Phoenix Mercury of the Women's National Basketball Association. She attended high school in Decatur, Alabama before playing basketball at Auburn University.

== Auburn statistics ==
Legend
GP	Games played	GS	Games started	MPG	Minutes per game
FG%	Field goal percentage	3P%	3-point field goal percentage	FT%	Free throw percentage
RPG	Rebounds per game	APG	Assists per game	SPG	Steals per game
BPG	Blocks per game	PPG	Points per game	**Bold**	Career high

Year	Team	GP	Points	FG%	3P%	FT%	RPG	APG	SPG	BPG	PPG
2002-03	Auburn	**33**	230	37.1%	31.7%	**79.5%**	5.8	**1.5**	0.9	0.9	7.0
2003-04	Auburn	31	**282**	**49.8%**	**36.0%**	64.8%	**8.0**	1.4	**1.3**	**1.2**	**9.1**
Career		64	512	43.4%	33.3%	71.4%	6.9	1.5	1.1	1.0	8.0

== Basketball career ==
As a rookie with the San Antonio Silver Stars in 2004, Stevenson's best performance came on July 1 in Seattle, when she scored a season-high nine points in only 18 minutes. A free agent after the season, Stevenson signed with the Seattle Storm on April 21. Stevenson appeared in four games for the Storm, tallying six points and grabbing six rebounds in 53 minutes of action, before being placed on the Injured List with lower back pain on June 6. Stevenson was the surprise Opening Day starter at small forward, scoring two points and grabbing four rebounds. Stevenson subsequently returned to the bench as a backup post, but lost playing time when Suzy Batkovic joined the team. Despite Anne Donovan's glowing praise of her she was waived on July 6, 2005.

On March 21, 2007, the Phoenix Mercury announced they had added Stevenson to the team's training camp roster.

== WNBA career statistics ==
Legend
GP	Games played	GS	Games started	MPG	Minutes per game	RPG	Rebounds per game
APG	Assists per game	SPG	Steals per game	BPG	Blocks per game	PPG	Points per game
TO	Turnovers per game	FG%	Field-goal percentage	3P%	3-point field-goal percentage	FT%	Free-throw percentage
**Bold**	Career best	°	League leader

=== Regular season ===
Year	Team	GP	GS	MPG	FG%	3P%	FT%	RPG	APG	SPG	BPG	TO	PPG
2004	San Antonio	**29**	0	8.9	**33.3**	0.0	**87.5**	1.2	0.2	0.2	0.1	**0.4**	1.3
2005	Seattle	4	**1**	**13.3**	25.0	0.0	0.0	**1.5**	**0.3**	0.5	0.0	1.0	1.5
2006	Phoenix	2	0	9.0	20.0	**100.0**	0.0	1.0	0.0	0.5	**0.5**	1.0	1.5
Career	3 years, 3 teams	35	1	9.4	30.6	66.7	87.5	1.2	0.2	0.3	0.1	0.5	1.3
