= Point Mallard Park =

Park in Alabama, USA

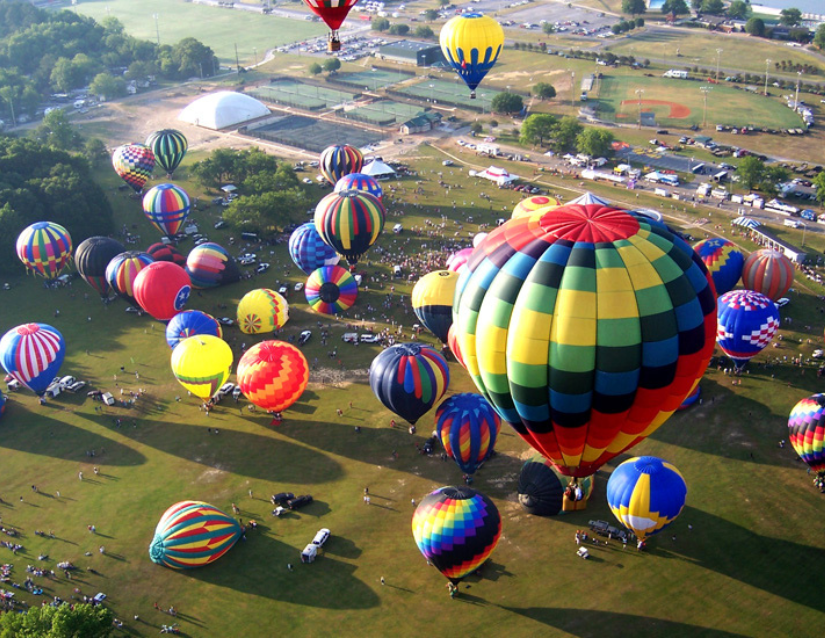
- Type: Public Park
- Location: Decatur, Alabama
- Coordinates: 34°34′25″N 86°56′17″W
- Area: 500 acres (200 ha)
- Created: 1970; 56 years ago
- Operator: City of Decatur
- Status: Open all year; Aquatic Center open only in summer
- Website: www.pointmallardpark.com

Point Mallard Park is a park located in Decatur, Alabama, United States that sits on 500 acres (2.0 km^{2}) of the Flint Creek shoreline. Flint Creek is a tributary of the nearby Tennessee River. The park, portions of which are open year-round, borders the Wheeler National Wildlife Refuge and is operated by the City of Decatur Parks and Recreation Board. It is positioned in the city's far southeasternmost section. The park was named after a frequent avian visitor to the Wildlife Refuge.

== History ==
Point Mallard Park's J. Gilmer Blackburn Aquatic Center was developed after Gilmer Blackburn, mayor of Decatur from 1962 to 1968, saw enclosed "wave-making" swimming pools in Germany and thought one could be developed as a tourist attraction in the United States for his city. J. Austin Smith, an Ohio pool manufacturer, worked with the City of Decatur to design the pool. In 1967 the Point Mallard Authority was formed with the intent of creating a new park built around the aquatic attraction without the use of city tax revenue. The land where the park is now located was previously occupied by the Tennessee Valley Authority (TVA) for industrial use. The city issued $3.8 million in bonds for the initial cost of the park, and construction began in September 1969. The park opened on August 8, 1970, with the wave pool, an Olympic-sized swimming pool, and a public golf course. Decatur, along with Big Surf in Tempe, Arizona, claims to have built the nation's first wave pool (something the city boasted about in Point Mallard promotional materials for many years), but Big Surf's is actually the older of the two, opening in the summer of 1969. For reasons unknown, no other wave pools were constructed in the nation for another 11 years. The campground was constructed a few years later in 1972, and the open-air ice rink was opened in 1973, a rare occurrence of such a facility in an outdoor southern climate.

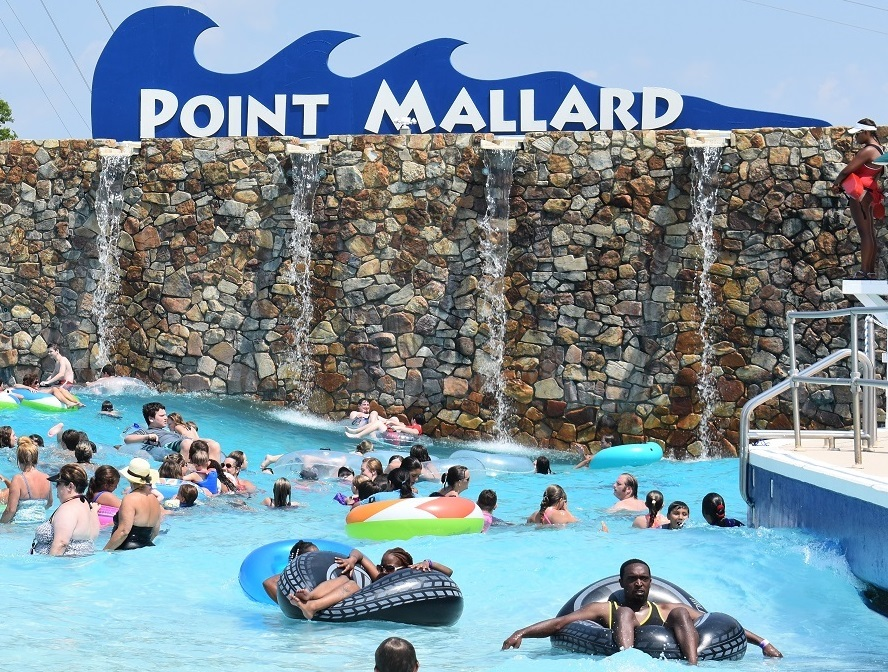
Point Malard Park is home to America's First Wave Pool

A few years after initial opening, a 10-meter-tall diving tower with three platforms was constructed. It is named after Olympic gold medalist Jennifer Chandler, who practiced there with U.S. Olympic Diving Team prior to her win in the 1976 Summer Olympics diving events. The pool was also where Greg Louganis, who won gold medals in the 1984 and 1988 Summer Olympics, trained from 1976 to 1979.

In 1976, after the first nine years of the event had been staged at Ogle Stadium and Delano Park, both located next to Decatur High School, the Spirit of America Festival, observed in and around the Fourth of July annually, moved to Point Mallard. The move occurred in time to celebrate the U.S. Bicentennial that year. It was enabled by the construction of a small outdoor, amphitheater-like stage to accommodate the Festival's musical performances, civic awards ceremonies, and a beauty pageant. In case of inclement weather, events are conducted instead in the basketball gymnasium of the T. C. Almon Recreation Center nearby on the Point Mallard campus. Over 40 years later, the stage is still occasionally employed for special events in addition to the Festival. The beauty pageant, a preliminary to the Miss America and Miss Alabama events, was discontinued in the 2010s due to declining public interest. The Festival ends with a massive fireworks display on the late evening of July 4. Since Point Mallard is already an established tourist attraction for people within a roughly 100-mile radius of Decatur due to the Aquatic Center, attendance at Spirit of America is usually larger than one would expect for an otherwise ordinary local function.

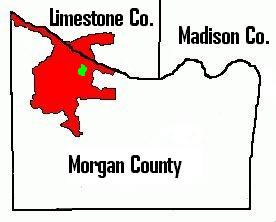
Point Mallard Park

President Ronald Reagan, then campaigning for reelection, spoke at the Festival on July 4, 1984, appearing before some 60,000 persons and considerable local and national media coverage. At the time, the City of Decatur only had between 40,000 and 50,000 residents, meaning the attendance at the Reagan speech was larger than the city itself. The presidential visit became the high-water mark of attendance at Spirit of America.

Beginning in 1978, Spirit of America was joined by another annual celebration at Point Mallard. The Alabama Jubilee Hot Air Balloon Classic is held each year on the days of and before Memorial Day; it was inaugurated in part to debut a then-new municipal balloon, which was a promotional tool for the city's tourism initiatives. The Classic revolves around hot-air balloon racing, attracting mostly Southeastern-based enthusiasts for the hobby and spectators. Other activities include car and tractor shows and an arts and crafts display, along with a limited amount of live music; while usually well-attended, the Classic is typically smaller in scope than Spirit of America is.

In 1987, the wave pool was renamed the J. Gilmer Blackburn Aquatic Center after Mayor Blackburn (see above).

Beginning circa 1990s, Civil War reenactors began holding an annual event featuring mock battles each September at Point Mallard.

In 2013, the park finished construction on a lazy river and two new speed slides for the Aquatic Center.

In 2016, the Aquatic Center attracted more than 165,000 visitors.

== Activities and recreation centers ==
- Point Mallard Golf Course
  - 200 acres (0.81 km^{2})
  - 18 holes
  - driving range
  - clubhouse
  - restrooms and showers
  - lounge and patio
  - concessions
- Point Mallard Campgrounds
  - 210 campsites
  - 115 with sewer hookups
  - 25 acres (100,000 m^{2})
  - laundry facilities
  - 3 pavilions with showers and restrooms
- Point Mallard Ice Complex
- Jimmy Johns Tennis Center, named after a famed local amateur player
  - 12 championship tennis hard courts
  - 4 championship tennis clay courts
  - 2 indoor hard courts in bubble dome
  - backboard area
- Spirit of America Soccer Park
  - Ronald Reagan Field, named after the 1984 presidential visit (see above)
- T.C. Almon Recreation Center, named after a former Morgan County probate judge
  - basketball
  - table tennis
  - racquetball
  - weight room
- Bill J. Dukes Athletic Complex, named after a former Decatur mayor
  - batting cages
  - driving range
  - baseball and softball fields
- hiking, jogging, and biking trails
- Spirit of America Stage

== Celebrations/festivals ==
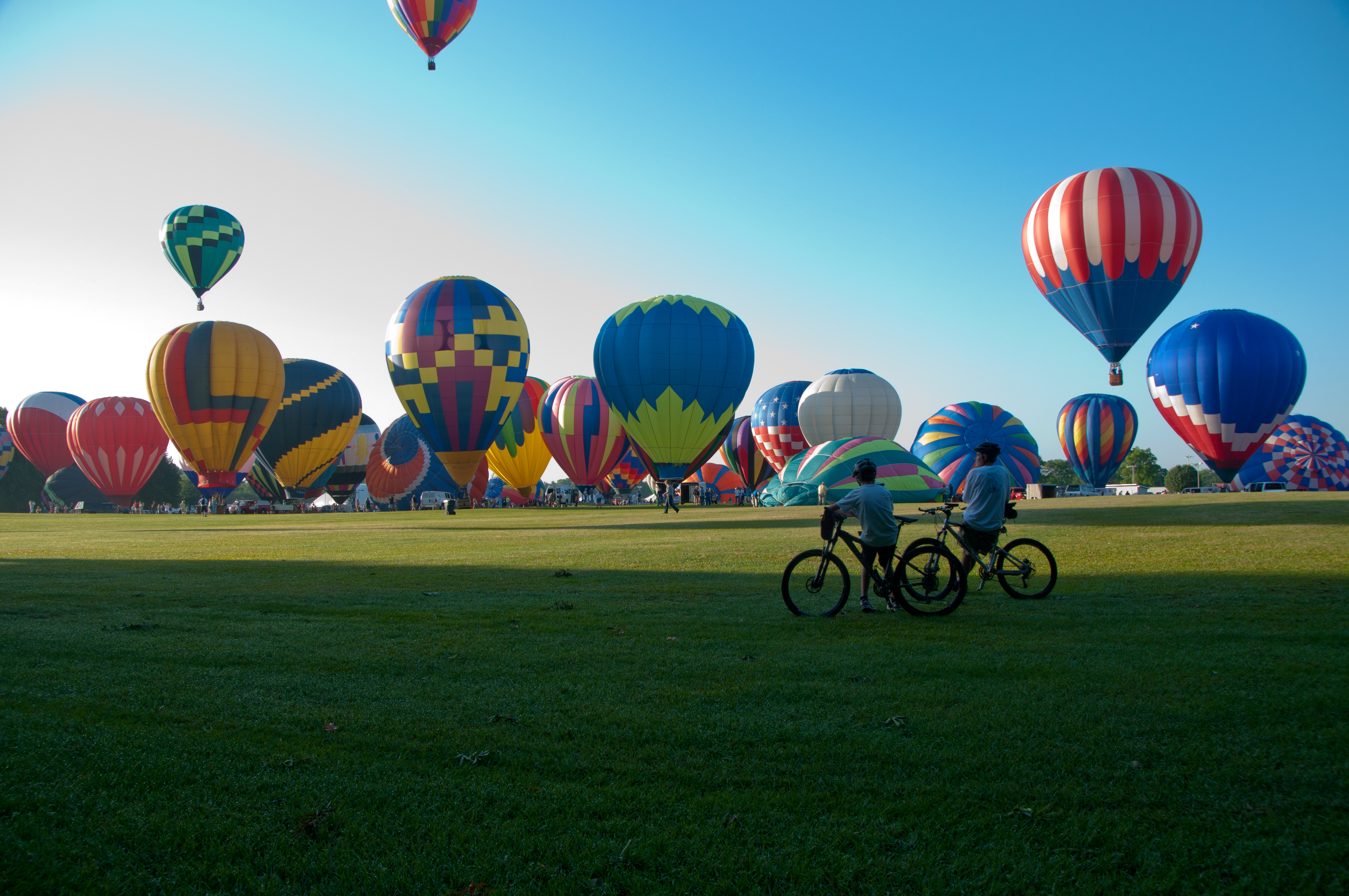
Annual Alabama Jubilee Hot Air Balloon Festival held at Point Malard Park

- Alabama Jubilee Hot Air Balloon Classic: Memorial Day weekend (May; dates vary).
- Spirit of America Festival: July 3 and 4.
- September Civil War Reenactment/Skirmish: approximately first week in September; dates vary.
