= Cricket Lee =

Cricket Lee (born March 17, 1953, in Decatur, Alabama) is an American entrepreneur and inventor notable for created a clothes fitting standard called Fitlogic, designed to include size and three body types for US women, and founding the company Fit Technologies to market the standard.
