= Decatur, Alabama =

City in and county seat of Morgan County, Alabama

- City
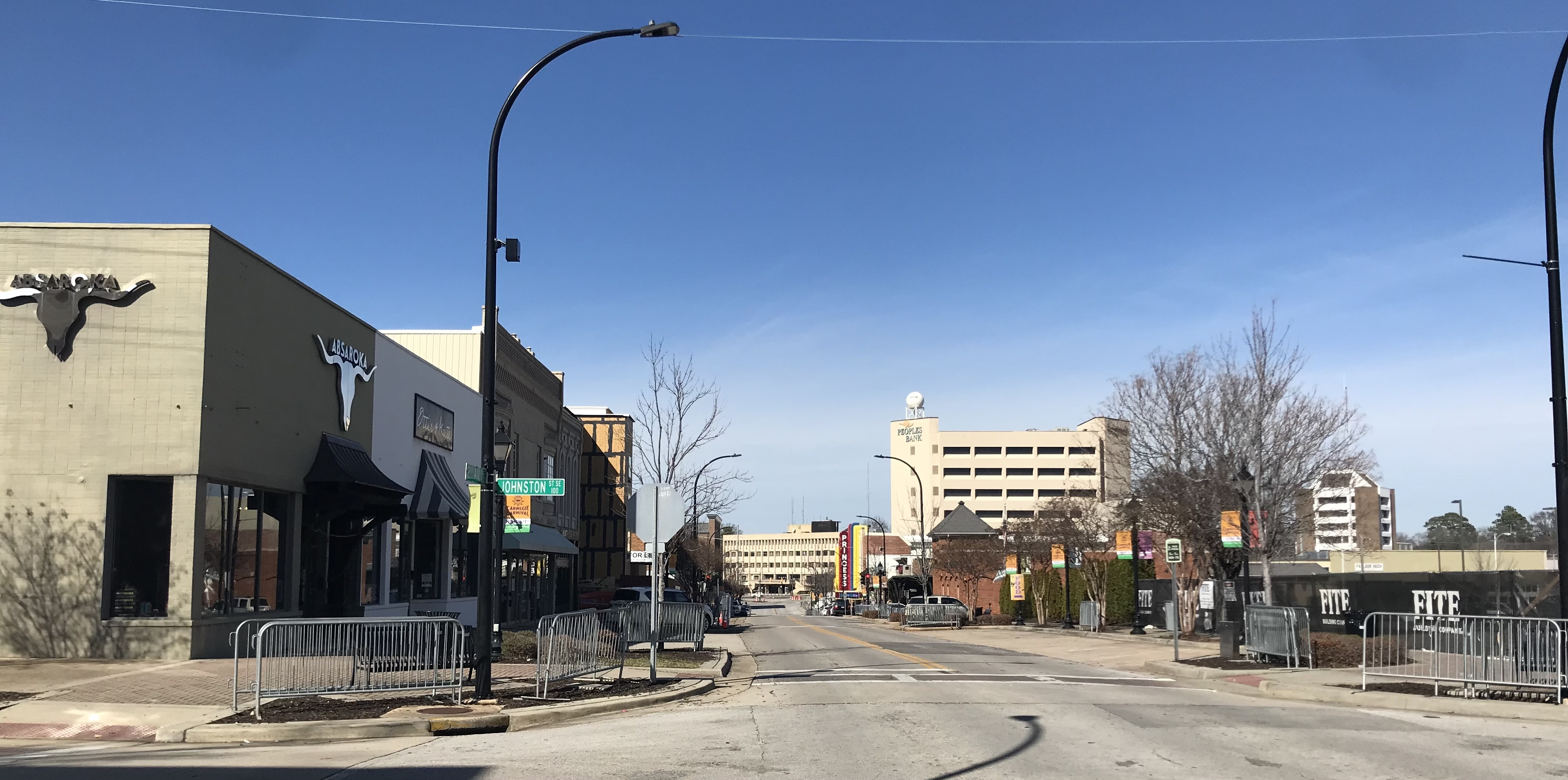
- Downtown viewed from 2nd street

- Flag Logo
- Nicknames: The River City, The Chicago of the South, The Heart of the Valley,
- Motto: "The City of Opportunity"
- Location in Limestone County and Morgan County, Alabama
- Coordinates: 34°34′23″N 86°59′25″W
- Country: United States
- State: Alabama
- Counties: Morgan, Limestone
- Founded: June 16, 1820
- Incorporated: December 8, 1826

Government
  - Type: Mayoral-Council

Area
  - City: 61.020 sq mi (158.041 km^{2})
  - Land: 54.594 sq mi (141.398 km^{2})
  - Water: 6.426 sq mi (16.643 km^{2})
- Elevation: 594 ft (181 m)

Population (2020)
  - City: 57,938
  - Estimate (2024): 57,974
  - Rank: US: 682nd AL: 10th
  - Density: 1,061/sq mi (409.6/km^{2})
  - Urban: 60,458 (US: 449th)
  - Urban density: 1,390/sq mi (537/km^{2})
  - Metro: 157,425 (US: 272nd)
  - Metro density: 123.9/sq mi (47.85/km^{2})
  - Combined: 879,315 (US: 68th)
  - Combined density: 255.3/sq mi (98.57/km^{2})
- Time zone: UTC−6 (Central (CST))
  - Summer (DST): UTC−5 (CDT)
- ZIP Codes: 35601, 35602, 35603, 35609, 35699
- Area codes: 256 and 938
- FIPS code: 01-20104
- GNIS feature ID: 2404206
- Website: cityofdecatural.com

Decatur (/dɪˈkeɪtər/) is the largest city in and the county seat of Morgan County (with a portion also in Limestone County) in the U.S. state of Alabama. Nicknamed "The River City," it is located in northern Alabama on the banks of Wheeler Lake along the Tennessee River. The population was 57,938 at the 2020 census.

Decatur is the core city of the two-county large Decatur metropolitan area, with an estimated population of 157,425 in 2022. Combined with the Huntsville Metropolitan Area, the two create the Huntsville-Decatur Combined Statistical Area, of which Decatur is the second-largest city.

Like many southern cities in the early 19th century, Decatur's early success was based upon its location along a river. Railroad routes and boating traffic pushed the city to the front of North Alabama's economic atmosphere. The city rapidly grew into a large economic center within the Tennessee Valley and was a hub for travelers and cargo between Nashville and Mobile, as well as Chattanooga and New Orleans. Throughout the 20th century, the city experienced steady growth but was eclipsed as the regional economic center by the fast-growing Huntsville during the space race. Decatur now finds its economy heavily based on manufacturing, mining, cargo transit, chemical, and high-tech companies such as Vulcan Materials, Daikin, Toray, and United Launch Alliance.

== History ==
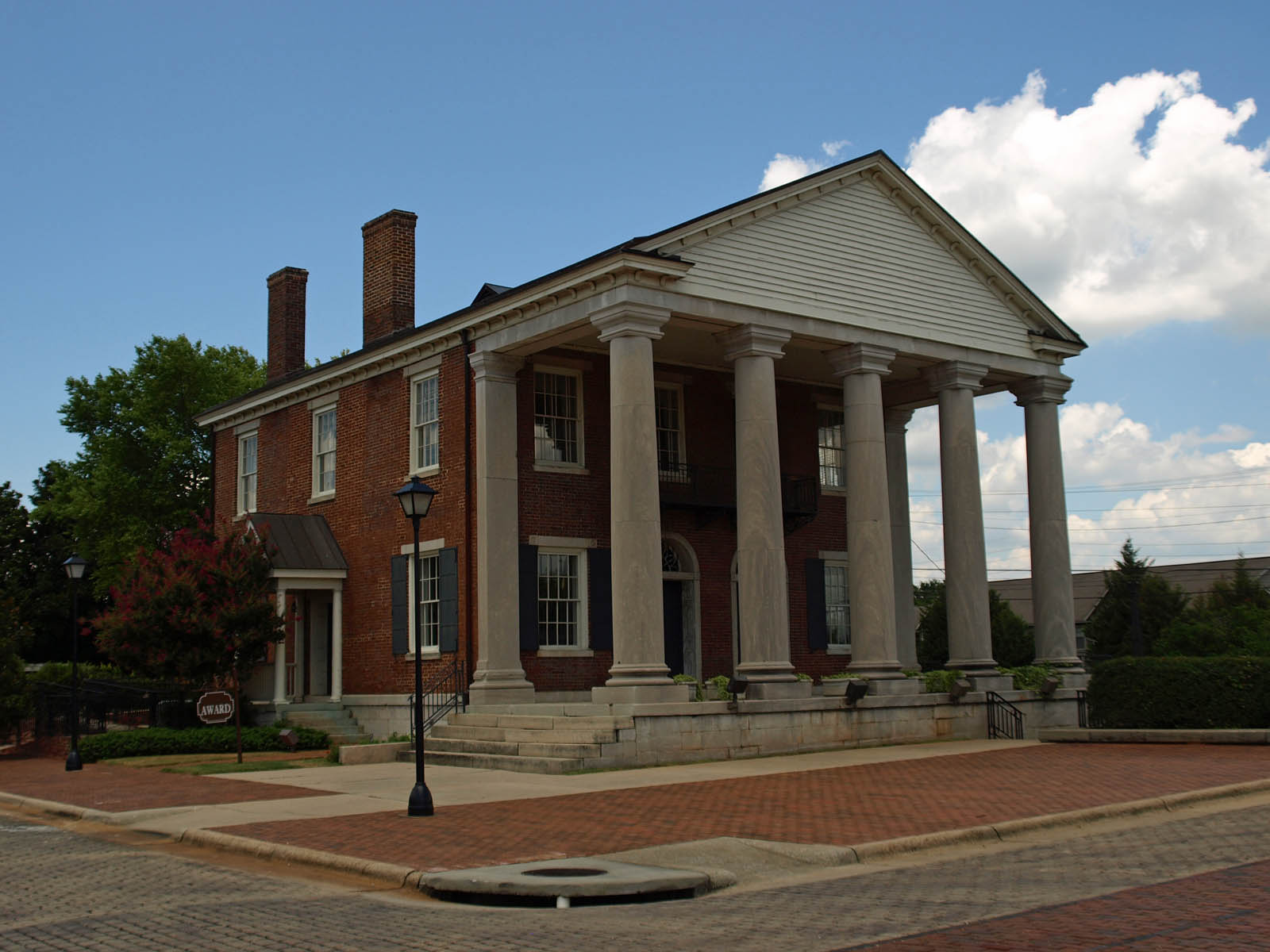
Old State Bank

Initially, the area was known as "Rhodes Ferry Landing", named for Dr. Henry W. Rhodes, an early landowner who operated a ferry that crossed the Tennessee River in the 1810s at the present-day location of Rhodes Ferry Park. The city was incorporated as Decatur in 1821. It was named in honor of Stephen Decatur; after he was killed in a duel in 1820, President Monroe directed that the Alabama town be named for him.

In the early 1830s, Decatur was the eastern terminus of the Tuscumbia, Courtland and Decatur Railroad, the first railway built west of the Appalachian Mountains. In 1850, the Tuscumbia, Courtland and Decatur was incorporated into the Memphis & Charleston Railroad.

Because of its location on the Tennessee River at the strategically important crossing of two major railroads, Decatur was the site of several encounters during the American Civil War. When the Union Army occupied the city early in the war, the commanding general ordered all but four buildings in the town to be destroyed. Bricks from some of the churches in town were used to build stoves and chimneys for the buildings that housed soldiers. Three of the buildings that remained are still standing - the Old State Bank, the Dancy-Polk House, and the Burleson-Hinds-McEntire House. After the Union victory in the Battle of Atlanta, a Confederate army under the command of General John Bell Hood briefly sparred with a vastly outmanned garrison during the 1864 Battle of Decatur, when the city was referred to as "A Tough Nut to Crack."

While the city was under Confederate control, plans for the Battle of Shiloh were mapped out within the Burleson-Hinds-McEntire House. These activities make the house one of the most historic buildings in Decatur.

New Decatur was a city that rose out of the ashes of former Decatur west of the railroad tracks. New Decatur was founded in 1887 and incorporated in 1889. However, residents of the older Decatur resented the new town, founded and occupied by people who moved down from northern states. Animosity was built until New Decatur renamed their town "Albany" after Albany, New York, in September 1916. The impetus to meld the two towns came from the need for a bridge, instead of a ferry, across the Tennessee River. The Decatur Kiwanis Club was formed with an equal number of members from each town to organize efforts to get the state to build the bridge. In 1925, the two cities merged to form one City of Decatur. There is a noticeable difference between the two sides of town. The cities developed differently at different times and still to this day have somewhat different cultures. Eastern portions of Decatur tend to act more suburban and traditional, while western portions tend to look more metropolitan and contemporary.

The Old State Bank, on the edge of downtown, is the oldest bank building in the State of Alabama, being 190 years old. The first wave pool in the United States was built in Decatur and is still in operation at the Point Mallard Aquatic Center. The city has the largest Victorian-era home district in the state of Alabama.

In the past, its industries included repair shops of the Louisville and Nashville Railroad, car works, engine works, bottling plants, and manufacturers of lumber, sashes and blinds, tannic acid, fertilizers, cigars, flour, cottonseed oil, and various other products.

== Geography ==
The Tennessee River has traditionally been the northern border of the city and Morgan County, but a small portion of the city extends across the river into Limestone County between U.S. 31 and I-65. Major bodies of water in the city include Wheeler Lake on the Tennessee River itself, plus Flint Creek, and Dry Branch, tributaries of the Tennessee River. The city extends to the other side of Flint Creek and the Refuge in the Indian Hills and Burningtree subdivision areas.

The northern portion of Decatur sits on top of a short hill that overlooks the Tennessee River; this creates a very steep drop-off to the river shore at Rhodes Ferry Park. This hill allows the "Steamboat Bill" Memorial Bridge to leave the mainland at grade without any major sloping required to cross the river while not interfering with Decatur's heavy barge traffic. This hill extends from the banks of the river about 1.5 miles (2.4 km) south to the 14th St./Magnolia St. intersection with 6th Avenue (US 31).

South past the 14th St. and 6th Ave. intersection, land remains flat. South, and also west, past S.R. 67 there are a few minor ridges that sit within the city limits.

According to the United States Census Bureau, the city has a total area of 61.020 square miles (158.04 km^{2}), of which 54.594 square miles (141.40 km^{2}) is land and 6.426 square miles (16.64 km^{2}), is water. Decatur is 25 miles (40 km) southwest of Huntsville, 86 miles (138 km) north of Birmingham, and 44 miles (71 km) east of Muscle Shoals.

=== Climate ===
Decatur has a humid subtropical climate (Köppen Cfa) with four distinct seasons.

Winters are generally mild, with a January daily average temperature of 40.6 °F (4.8 °C). On average, the low temperature falls to the freezing mark or below on 59 days a year, and to or below 20 °F (−7 °C) on 9.2 days. Winters usually do not produce much snow; a large amount of snow is rare within the city limits. A small, measurable amount of snow can be experienced a few times each year. In 2011, Decatur received up to 8 inches (20 cm) of snow in a single storm. It tied for the most since 1963. Summers are hot and humid with a July daily average temperature of 79.6 °F (26.4 °C). There are 51–52 days of 90 °F (32 °C)+ highs annually and 1.7 days of 100 °F (38 °C)+ highs. Thunderstorms are common during the summer months. The latter part of summer tends to be drier. Autumn, which spans from mid-September to early December, tends to be similar to spring in terms of temperature and precipitation, although it begins relatively dry.

Precipitation averages about 53.4 inches per year and on average, is relatively (and uniformly) heavy from November to July, with December the single wettest month on average; August through October are slightly drier months on average. Occasionally, severe thunderstorms occur. These storms can produce damaging winds and large hail in addition to the usual hazards of lightning and very heavy rain. There is also the risk of tornadoes. Severe thunderstorms can occur at any time of the year, but are most common during the spring months. A secondary severe weather season peaks in November. Occasionally from July to October, the Decatur area experiences strong winds and/or heavy to excessive rain from tropical disturbances. These commonly make landfall along the Gulf Coast as hurricanes but lose intensity as they move inland.

The highest recorded temperature was 108 °F (42 °C) on July 28, 1952, and August 16, 1954, while the lowest recorded temperature was −19 °F (−28 °C) on January 30, 1966.

Climate data for Decatur, Alabama (1991–2020 normals)
Month	Jan	Feb	Mar	Apr	May	Jun	Jul	Aug	Sep	Oct	Nov	Dec	Year
Record high °F (°C)	78 (26)	82 (28)	87 (31)	94 (34)	99 (37)	105 (41)	108 (42)	108 (42)	105 (41)	97 (36)	86 (30)	80 (27)	108 (42)
Mean daily maximum °F (°C)	50.7 (10.4)	55.4 (13.0)	63.7 (17.6)	73.0 (22.8)	80.8 (27.1)	87.6 (30.9)	89.8 (32.1)	89.8 (32.1)	85.1 (29.5)	74.5 (23.6)	62.3 (16.8)	53.6 (12.0)	72.2 (22.3)
Daily mean °F (°C)	41.4 (5.2)	45.3 (7.4)	52.7 (11.5)	61.6 (16.4)	69.9 (21.1)	77.1 (25.1)	79.7 (26.5)	78.8 (26.0)	73.1 (22.8)	62.0 (16.7)	50.8 (10.4)	44.1 (6.7)	61.4 (16.3)
Mean daily minimum °F (°C)	32.0 (0.0)	35.2 (1.8)	41.7 (5.4)	50.1 (10.1)	59.1 (15.1)	66.6 (19.2)	69.7 (20.9)	67.9 (19.9)	61.2 (16.2)	49.5 (9.7)	39.2 (4.0)	34.6 (1.4)	50.6 (10.3)
Record low °F (°C)	−19 (−28)	−4 (−20)	7 (−14)	20 (−7)	35 (2)	42 (6)	51 (11)	50 (10)	36 (2)	24 (−4)	0 (−18)	−5 (−21)	−19 (−28)
Average precipitation inches (mm)	4.64 (118)	4.96 (126)	4.96 (126)	4.50 (114)	4.15 (105)	3.66 (93)	3.95 (100)	3.05 (77)	3.21 (82)	3.23 (82)	3.96 (101)	5.20 (132)	49.47 (1,257)
Average precipitation days (≥ 0.01 in)	9.3	12.1	11.0	11.0	10.8	11.4	12.4	10.6	8.3	8.6	9.7	10.8	126.0
Source 1: NOAA
Source 2: The Weather Channel (extremes)

=== Neighboring cities/towns ===
- Athens (north) - Limestone County
- Hartselle (south) - Morgan County
- Hillsboro (west) - Lawrence County
- Huntsville (northeast) - Madison/Limestone counties
- Madison (northeast) - Madison/Limestone counties (however Huntsville completely separates the two)
- Mooresville (northeast) - Limestone County
- Moulton (southwest) - Lawrence County
- Priceville (east) - Morgan County
- Trinity (west) - Morgan County

=== Neighborhoods ===
Decatur is divided into four different regions of town (Northeast, Southeast, Northwest, Southwest). Southeast and Northeast Decatur lie east of the CSX Railroad's mainline. North of Lee Street, the dividing line is Bank Street which runs a block east of and parallel to the railroad. Northeast and Southeast and are divided by Moulton Street. Southwest consists of the area west of the CSX Railroad and south of Moulton Street. Northwest is bordered by Moulton Street, the CSX Railroad from Moulton Street to Lee Street and then by Bank Street from Lee Street to the Tennessee River. While there are few major cultural differences between the East and the West, minute differences such as street grid patterns, zoning patterns, and architectural styles are noticeable.

==== Northwest ====
- West Decatur (the portion north of Moulton Street)

==== Northeast ====
- Albany (New Decatur)
- Downtown Decatur
- East Acres
- Old Decatur
- Bank Street and Second Avenue (Downtown Shopping District)
- Harborview (Riverfront)
- Irvington (Limestone County)
- Whiteside (Limestone County)

==== Southeast ====
- Bayside
- Brookmeade
- Burleson Mountain
- Burningtree Mountain
- Cedar Lake
- Fairview
- Flint
- Hickory Hills
- Indian Hills
- Point Mallard Estates

==== Southwest ====
- Autumn Ridge
- Austinville
- Basham
- Braswell
- Cedar Ridge
- Chapel Hill
- Chula Vista
- City View Estates
- Deerfoot Estates
- Dogwood Estates
- Dunbarton
- Flint
- Graystone
- Griffin Addition
- Longleaf Estates
- Moulton Heights
- Oak Lea
- Oakworth
- Timberlake
- Russell Village
- Vestavia
- West Decatur (the portion south of Moulton Street)
- Westmeade
- Woodtrail

== Demographics ==
Historical population
Census	Pop.	Note	%±
1850	606		—
1870	671		—
1880	1,063		58.4%
1890	2,765		160.1%
1900	3,114		12.6%
1910	4,228		35.8%
1920	4,752		12.4%
1930	15,593		228.1%
1940	16,604		6.5%
1950	19,974		20.3%
1960	29,217		46.3%
1970	38,044		30.2%
1980	42,002		10.4%
1990	48,761		16.1%
2000	53,929		10.6%
2010	55,683		3.3%
2020	57,938		4.0%
2025 (est.)	58,056	▲	0.2%
U.S. Decennial Census; 2020 Census

=== Racial and ethnic composition ===
Decatur city, Alabama – Racial and ethnic composition Note: the US Census treats Hispanic/Latino as an ethnic category. This table excludes Latinos from the racial categories and assigns them to a separate category. Hispanics/Latinos may be of any race. Race and ethnicity was not surveyed for populations under 2,500 in the 1980 census and under 1,000 in 1990 census.
Race / Ethnicity (NH = Non-Hispanic)	Pop 1980	Pop 1990	Pop 2000	Pop 2010	Pop 2020	% 1980	% 1990	% 2000	% 2010	% 2020
White alone (NH)	35,115	39,933	39,128	35,037	32,079	83.60%	81.90%	72.55%	62.92%	55.37%
Black or African American alone (NH)	6,399	8,002	10,456	11,971	13,314	15.23%	16.41%	19.39%	21.50%	22.98%
Native American or Alaska Native alone (NH)	62	129	305	309	207	0.15%	0.26%	0.57%	0.55%	0.36%
Asian alone (NH)	97	296	375	480	518	0.23%	0.61%	0.70%	0.86%	0.89%
Native Hawaiian or Pacific Islander alone (NH)	x	x	18	43	54	x	x	0.03%	0.08%	0.09%
Other race alone (NH)	16	15	47	53	199	0.04%	0.03%	0.09%	0.10%	0.34%
Mixed race or Multiracial (NH)	x	x	560	908	2,497	x	x	1.04%	1.63%	4.31%
Hispanic or Latino (any race)	313	386	3,040	6,882	9,070	0.75%	0.79%	5.64%	12.36%	15.65%
Total	42,002	48,761	53,929	55,683	57,938	100.00%	100.00%	100.00%	100.00%	100.00%

=== 2020 census ===
As of the 2020 census, Decatur had a population of 57,938. The median age was 39.9 years. 22.6% of residents were under the age of 18 and 18.1% of residents were 65 years of age or older. For every 100 females there were 94.5 males, and for every 100 females age 18 and over there were 91.5 males age 18 and over.

92.3% of residents lived in urban areas, while 7.7% lived in rural areas.

There were 23,570 households in Decatur, including 14,864 families. Of all households, 28.8% had children under the age of 18 living in them. 40.7% were married-couple households, 19.5% were households with a male householder and no spouse or partner present, and 34.0% were households with a female householder and no spouse or partner present. About 32.0% of all households were made up of individuals and 13.7% had someone living alone who was 65 years of age or older.

There were 25,351 housing units, of which 7.0% were vacant. The homeowner vacancy rate was 1.6% and the rental vacancy rate was 7.4%.

=== 2010 census ===
As of the 2010 census, there were 55,683 people, 22,576 households, and 14,918 families residing in the city. The population density was 953.5 inhabitants per square mile (368.1/km^{2}). There were 24,538 housing units at an average density of 420.2 per square mile (162.2/km^{2}). The racial makeup of the city was 66.5% White, 21.7% Black or African American, 0.7% Native American, 0.9% Asian, 0.1% Pacific Islander, 7.9% from other races, and 2.2% from two or more races. 12.4% of the population were Hispanic or Latino of any race.

There were 22,576 households, out of which 28.7% had children under the age of 18 living with them, 46.0% were married couples living together, 15.6% had a female householder with no husband present, and 33.9% were non-families. 29.9% of all households were made up of individuals, and 11.4% had someone living alone who was 65 years of age or older. The average household size was 2.42 and the average family size was 2.99.

In the city, the population was spread out, with 24.1% under the age of 18, 9.0% from 18 to 24, 26.1% from 25 to 44, 26.3% from 45 to 64, and 14.5% who were 65 years of age or older. The median age was 37.9 years. For every 100 females, there were 92.7 males. For every 100 females age 18 and over, there were 96.2 males.

The median income for a household in the city was $43,090, and the median income for a family was $55,158. Males had a median income of $42,146 versus $27,477 for females. The per capita income for the city was $23,615. About 12.8% of families and 17.5% of the population were below the poverty line, including 28.3% of those under age 18 and 11.1% of those age 65 or over.

=== 2000 census ===
As of the 2000 census, there were 53,929 people, 21,824 households, and 14,753 families residing in the city. The population density was 1,009.7 inhabitants per square mile (389.8/km^{2}). There were 23,950 housing units at an average density of 448.4 per square mile (173.1/km^{2}). The racial makeup of the city was 75.50% White, 19.56% Black or African American, 0.58% Native American, 0.70% Asian, 0.13% Pacific Islander, 2.22% from other races, and 1.33% from two or more races. 5.64% of the population were Hispanic or Latino of any race.

There were 21,824 households, out of which 31.8% had children under the age of 18 living with them, 50.7% were married couples living together, 13.4% had a female householder with no husband present, and 32.4% were non-families. 28.9% of all households were made up of individuals, and 10.7% had someone living alone who was 65 years of age or older. The average household size was 2.43 and the average family size was 2.99.

In the city, the population was spread out, with 25.4% under the age of 18, 8.8% from 18 to 24, 29.6% from 25 to 44, 23.1% from 45 to 64, and 13.1% who were 65 years of age or older. The median age was 36 years. For every 100 females, there were 92.4 males. For every 100 females age 18 and over, there were 89.5 males.

The median income for a household in the city was $37,192, and the median income for a family was $47,574. Males had a median income of $37,108 versus $22,471 for females. The per capita income for the city was $20,431. About 11.9% of families and 14.9% of the population were below the poverty line, including 21.2% of those under age 18 and 11.1% of those age 65 or over.

== Economy ==
Decatur has grown to be the busiest river port on the Tennessee River. The Port of Decatur sees large amounts of barge traffic from up and down the Tennessee River, which has led to twelve Fortune 500 companies opening plants in the city. Major employers include General Electric, 3M, Wayne Farms, United Launch Alliance, Nucor, Bunge Limited, Daikin, Hyosung, Ascend Performance Materials, and the Tennessee Valley Authority.

Decatur is also known as the "Home of Meow Mix", after the company bought a 200,000-square-foot (19,000 m^{2}) facility in town, and now utilizes its riverfront property to ship the finished product up and down the Tennessee River.

Being part of the Huntsville-Decatur CSA, the city lies within the region having the most engineers per capita in the nation.

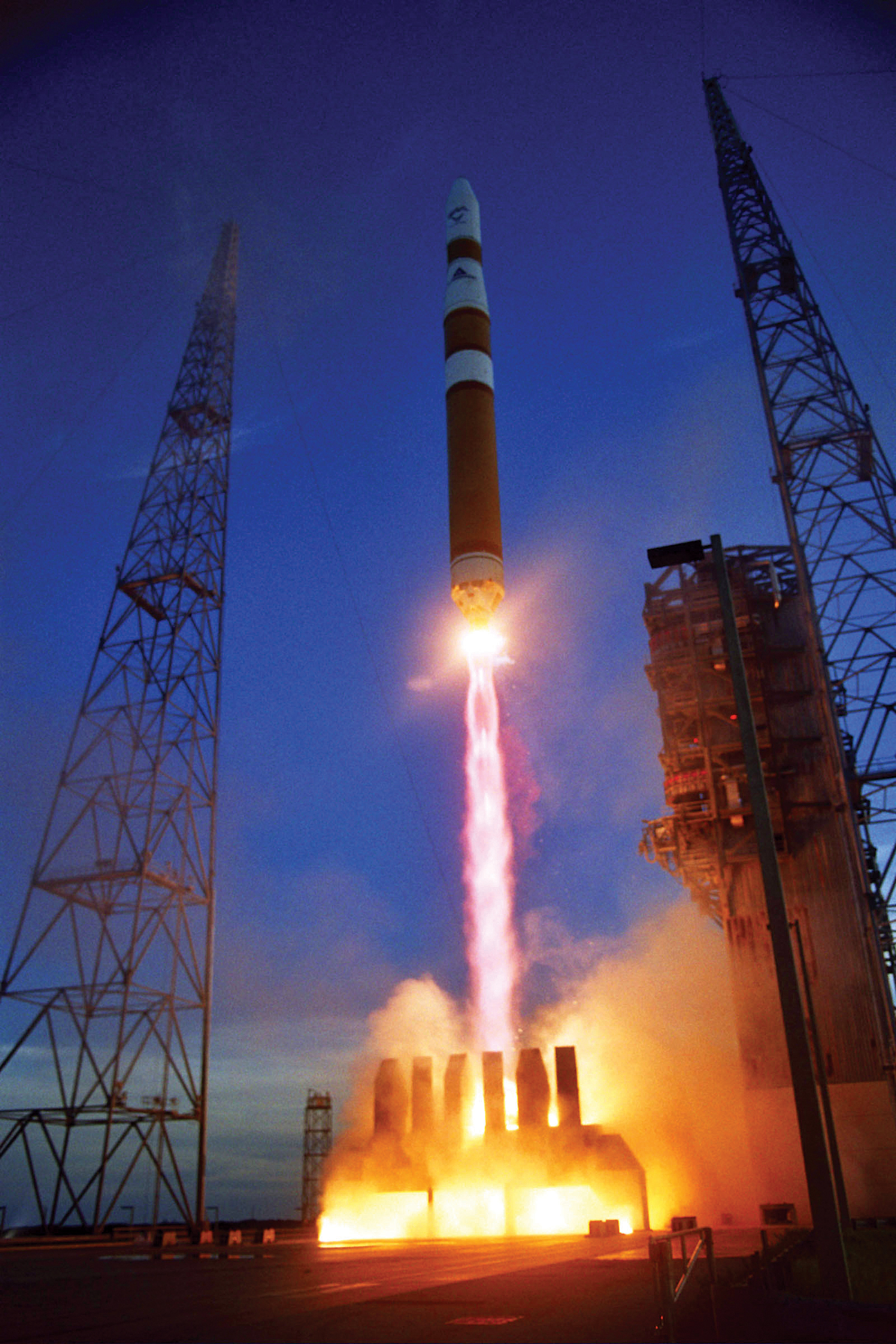
Delta IV rocket

Approval of the United Launch Alliance combined Lockheed-Martin and Boeing's rocket manufacturing contracts to a central location at the plant in Decatur. All satellite launching rockets used by the U.S. government will be built in Decatur. This approval brought over 230 new jobs to the Decatur area. The ULA plant utilizes the Tennessee River to ship the rockets to Cape Canaveral.

In March 2008, a $1.3 billion development, including a Bass Pro Shops was announced for the Interstate 65/Interstate 565 interchange inside the city limits. The development, named Sweetwater, would have included more than 1,000,000 square feet (93,000 m^{2}) of retail space, 825,000 square feet (76,600 m^{2}) of medical and office space, 2,700 residences, and an entertainment venue with seating for up to 8,000 people. A school, fire department, parks and lakes were expected to support the future development. As of Spring 2010, this project still seems to be on the horizon, but there is no set date for the project to start. As of 2012, Bass Pro Shop has removed Decatur from its list of stores "Coming Soon" on its webpage. In 2013, Mayor Don Kyle announced that the "Sweet Water" complex was back on track, but has not announced whether Bass Pro Shops will be involved or not. Research from the Franklin Center for Government and Public Integrity suggests that the economic impact of Bass Pro Shops is typically limited despite the large subsidies the company often receives.

=== Tourism ===
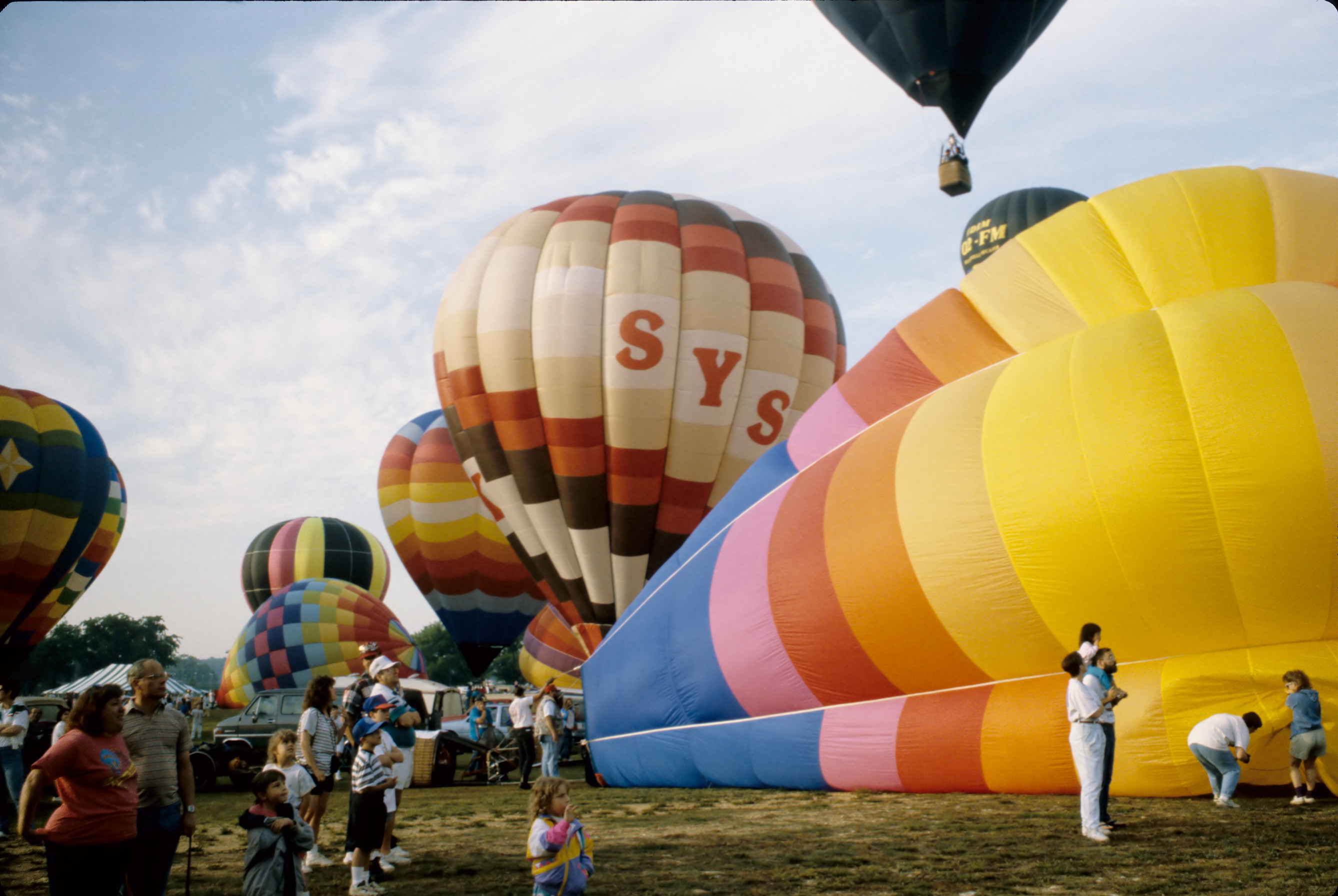
Balloons inflating at the 1990 Alabama Jubilee

Tourism is a major part of Decatur's economy. Hundreds of thousands of people from in and out of town and from many other countries and territories attend some of the premier festivals in the South.

The Alabama Jubilee, begun in 1978, is the oldest hot air balloon race south of the Kentucky Derby's Great Balloon Race (from 1973). With visiting populations rising to 100,000, people crowd around more than 60 seven-story-tall balloons as they inflate. Because of the Alabama Jubilee, Decatur has been named "The Ballooning Capital of Alabama" by the Alabama State Legislature.

The Spirit of America Festival is one of the largest free Fourth of July festivals in the South. More than 65,000 people arrive in Decatur to watch annual celebrations and the Miss Spirit of America beauty pageant. The contest was known as "Miss Point Mallard" from 1976 through 2013. It moved to the Princess Theatre in 2014.

Another large event in Decatur and North Alabama, the Racking Horse World Celebration attracts horses from around the world to compete in the largest Racking Horse competition. Held in the Celebration Arena near Priceville, the celebration draws up to 75,000 fans and competitors each year.

The Riverfest barbeque cook-off at Ingalls Harbor is sanctioned by the Kansas City Barbeque Society and attracts competitors from across the country. Beginning in 1995, the festival has previously been selected as a top ten tourist event in the State of Alabama, festival goers can expect live, nationally known musical acts, children's activities, and award-winning barbeque. Proceeds benefit the local community including several charitable organizations.

2018 saw the opening of the Cook Museum of Natural Science located at 133 Fourth Avenue NE Decatur, Alabama 35601 and showcases a wide variety of native animal and plant species within a state of the art facility. Cook Museum of Natural Science has been nominated by USA Today in their 2020 10 Best Readers' Choice travel awards as one of the best new museums to open in the past two years. Cook Museum of Natural Science is the newspaper's only Alabama-based nominee.

== Parks and recreation ==
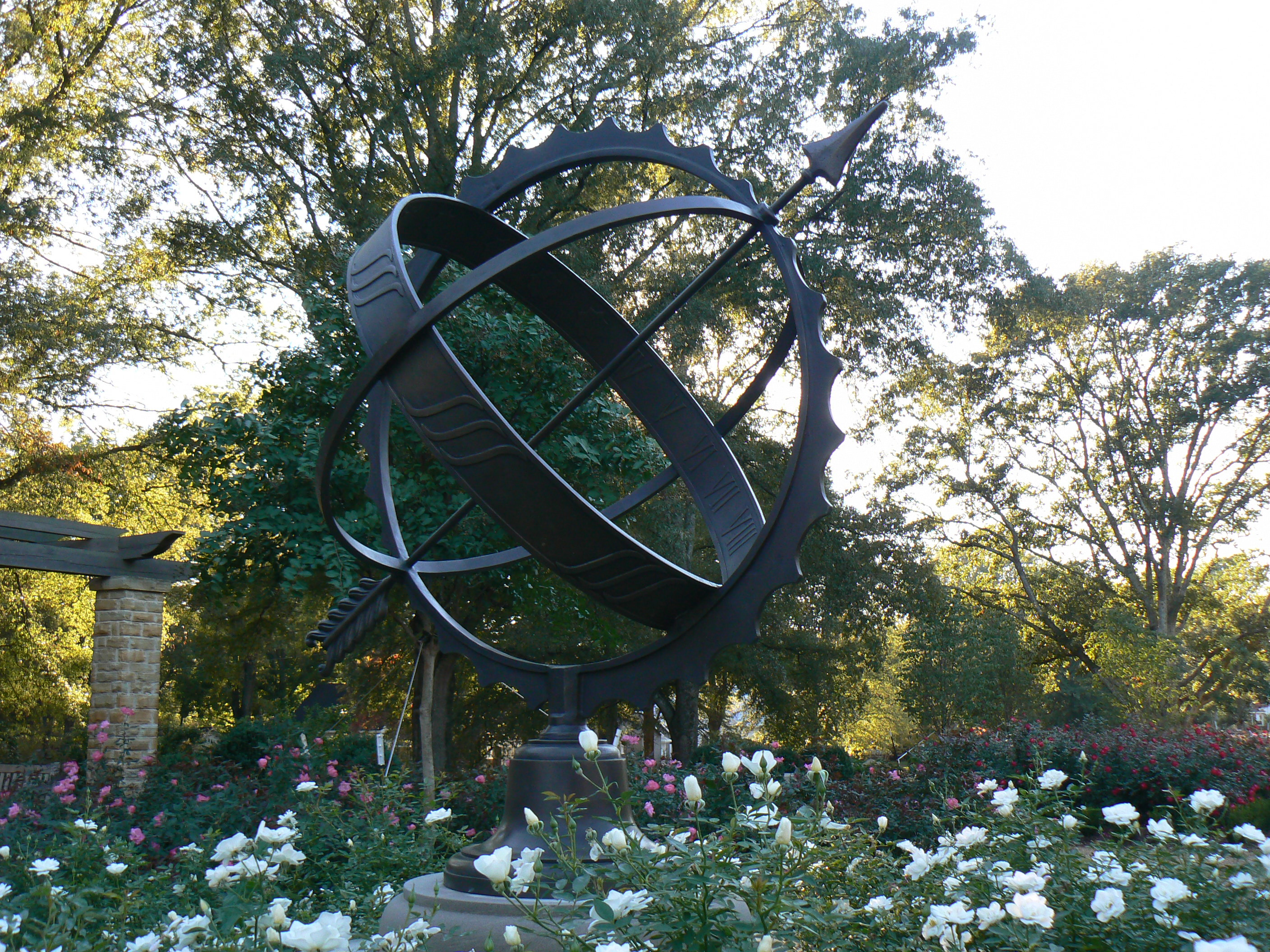
Replica of historic structure in the re-constructed Rose Garden in Delano Park

Delano Park - Founded in 1887, the 28 acre Delano Park (pronounced DELL-uh-no) is Morgan County's oldest city park in continuous operation and an oasis in the heart of historic Decatur. At 125 years old, the park is recognized as a designed historic landscape and is listed on the National Historic Register.

== Government ==
The current mayor of Decatur is Kent Lawrence, who was elected in 2025. The city has a five-member/district City Council.

== Education ==
Austin High and Decatur High are the two main high schools of the city. With the addition of the International Baccalaureate Program to Austin and Decatur High Schools, Decatur has become the first Alabama school system north of Birmingham and one of five in the state to offer the honors program for juniors and seniors (as of July 2006).

=== Public schools ===
==== High schools ====
- Austin High School
- Decatur High School

==== Middle schools ====
- Decatur Middle School
- Austin Middle School
- Austin Junior High

=== Private schools ===
- Decatur Heritage Christian Academy
- Cornerstone Christian School (K-12)
- St. Ann's Catholic School (K-8)

=== Higher education ===
- Alabama Center for the Arts
- Calhoun Community College System
- Strayer University

== Media ==
=== Newspapers ===
The Decatur Daily has been the only major newspaper based in the Decatur Metropolitan Area since 1912, and one of the few family owned newspapers in Alabama. It has an average daily circulation of 20,824 and a Sunday circulation of 23,840. The paper circulates in the morning to an area that includes Morgan County, Lawrence County, and Limestone County, and parts of Cullman County, Madison County and Winston County.

The Huntsville Times is the only other newspaper with a larger circulation in the Huntsville-Decatur Combined Statistical Area, and has been in circulation since 1996 to most area counties, when the Huntsville News closed. Before then, the News was the morning paper, and the Times was the afternoon paper. After the News closed, the Times remained an afternoon paper until 2004.

=== Cable/Phone ===
Spectrum, AT&T and WOW! offer cable TV to Decatur. AT&T, Spectrum and WOW! offer phone service to Decatur. With AT&T, Huntsville and Madison are local calls (Madison County only), but Athens is long distance. Decatur comes within 3 miles (5 km) of Athens and touches Huntsville. AT&T has begun rolling out their fiber network as of 2018.

== Infrastructure ==
=== Transportation ===
==== Air ====
Decatur is served by two major airports. The Huntsville International Airport, in suburban Huntsville, is the second busiest airport in Alabama, behind Birmingham International Airport. The city is also served by the busiest regional airport in Alabama, the Pryor Field Regional Airport.

==== Roads ====
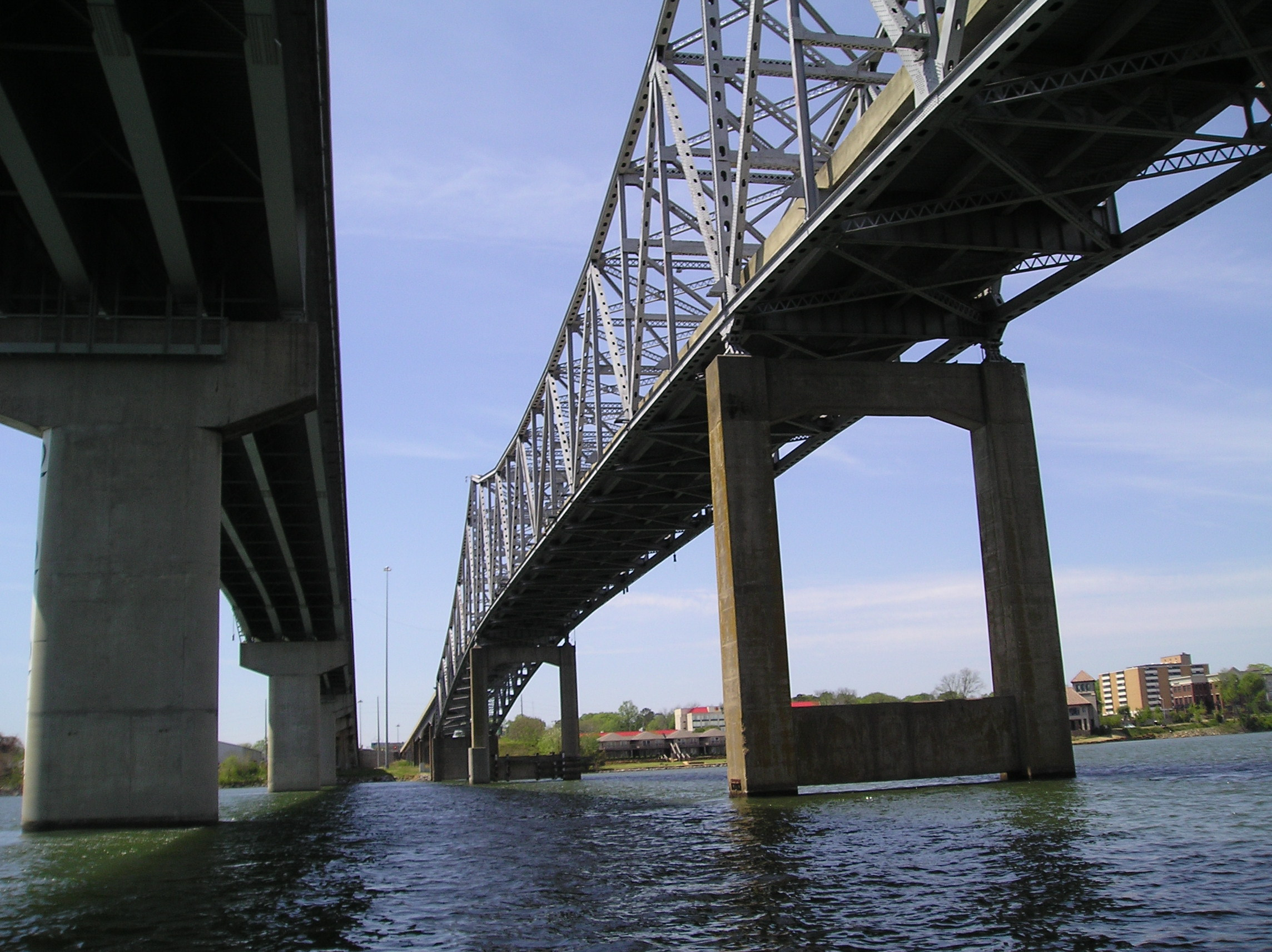
Captain William J. Hudson "Steamboat Bill" Memorial Bridges

Decatur's main thoroughfares are U.S. Route 31 (6th Avenue), U.S. Route 72 Alternate (S.R. 20), State Route 24, and State Route 67. 6th Avenue begins as both U.S. 72 Alternate and U.S. 31, and the two routes split after being carried by the twin-span "Steamboat Bill" Hudson Memorial Bridge that crosses the Tennessee River at the north central part of town. SR 20/Alternate U.S. 72 continues west towards The Shoals and Florence. U.S. 31 connects the city to Athens in the north, and Cullman in the south. A portion of S.R. 67 is known as Beltline Road, and serves as a partial beltway around the city. Interstate 65 runs east of the city, and connects the area to Nashville in the north and Birmingham in the south. Interstate 565 begins in Limestone County northeast of the city, and connects to Huntsville. Transforming U.S. 72 Alternate into an extension of Interstate 565 into the city has been discussed in the past.

===== Major highways =====
- Interstate 65
- Interstate 565
- U.S. Highway 31
- U.S. Highway 72 Alternate
- SR 20
- SR 24
- SR 67

==== Water (River) ====
Large shipments can move from Decatur to the Atlantic Ocean via the Tennessee River to the Mississippi River and the Gulf of Mexico. The United States builds some of its space launch vehicles in Decatur (United Launch Alliance vehicles only), and ships them to both Cape Canaveral and Vandenberg Air Force Base via this water route.

==== Rail ====
Decatur has two railroads, the Norfolk Southern Railway, and CSX Transportation (CSX) main line, the S&NA North Subdivision (Nashville to Birmingham). CSX operates a yard downtown. Norfolk Southern main line is the Memphis District East End. The line runs from Sheffield, Alabama, to Chattanooga, Tennessee. The rest of the line, west of Sheffield to Memphis, Tennessee, is the Memphis District West End. The line receives trackage rights in Stevenson, Alabama, from CSX on their Chattanooga Subdivision to Chattanooga.

Until 1971 the Decatur Union Depot was served by several Louisville and Nashville trains (Humming Bird, Pan-American and South Wind) originating in Chicago or Cincinnati and terminating at New Orleans or Miami, Florida, to the south. Amtrak from 1971 until 1979 operated the Floridian that made a station stop in Decatur. The Southern Railway's Tennessean served points to the east and west. The station is now a municipal museum.

==== Transit ====
The North Central Alabama Regional Council of Governments operates NARCOG Transit, which provides demand-response service in the city. There is no fixed-route transit.

=== Public safety ===
Decatur
- Crime rates* (2022)

Violent crimes
- Homicide: 12
- Rape: 21
- Robbery: 35
- Aggravated assault: 175
- Total violent crime: 243

Property crimes
- Burglary: 181
- Larceny-theft: 1,176
- Motor vehicle theft: 157
- Arson: 162
- Total property crime: 1,676
- Note: Reported crimes per 100,000 population Source: 2022 FBI UCR Data

The Public Safety Department consists of the Decatur Police Department and Decatur Fire & Rescue. The Public Safety annex is located at 4119 Old Highway 31 in the Flint Community at the south end of the city and houses the Fire Department's administrative offices. This is also the site of the fire and police training facilities. The Police and Fire Departments currently cover approx. 130 square miles (340 km^{2}) in and around the city. Both the Decatur Police and Decatur Fire & Rescue are dispatched by the Morgan County E-911 Center.

The Decatur Police Department consists of approx. 140 officers, assigned to 4 divisions (Operations, Management Services, Criminal Investigations, & Administration). The current interim Chief of Police is Nadis Carlisle Jr.

Decatur Fire & Rescue is an Advanced Life Support, full service department consisting of approx. 115 firefighters. The department currently runs 6 Engine Companies (with 3 in reserve), 2 Ladder Companies, 1 Heavy Rescue (which also responds as part of AL-TF3), 1 Brush Truck, 1 HazMat Unit, 1 Battalion Chief Vehicle, and several other staff and support vehicles out of 8 Fire Stations. The current Fire Chief is Tracy Thornton.

Decatur is also home to the Morgan County Rescue Squad, an all volunteer organization, who responds to water, cave and high angle rope rescues all throughout Morgan County. They operate multiple land vehicles, 4 response boats and several smaller vessels out of 1 station (also located in Flint) and 2 boat houses on the Tennessee River, with approximately 30–40 members.

=== Emergency medical services and healthcare ===
Decatur is currently served by Decatur-Morgan EMS, the ambulance service for Decatur Morgan Hospital. Air Evac Lifeteam provides aeromedical services for the city of Decatur and North Alabama.

Decatur is served by two hospitals, Decatur General Hospital and Parkway Medical Center. Decatur General Hospital is a 273-bed, general acute care hospital and a 64-bed behavioral medicine hospital making it the third largest employer in Morgan County. Decatur General is accredited by the Joint Commission and its medical staff consists of more than 200 physicians representing 20 specialties. Decatur General Hospital is designated as a level two trauma center by the Alabama Department of Public Health. Parkway Medical Center is a 120-bed hospital that is designated as a level three trauma center by the Alabama Department of Public Health. As of January 1, 2012, Huntsville Hospital is the full owner of Parkway Medical Center. Parkway was formally a private not-for-profit hospital until their purchase from the public Huntsville Hospital System. Huntsville Hospital is the region's referral center and also serves as North Alabama's level one trauma center. As of November 2010, Decatur General Hospital and Huntsville Hospital are affiliate hospitals, ensuring the continued tradition and excellence of public, not-for-profit health care in North Alabama.

== Notable people ==
- Joseph Abbott, U.S. congressman from 1887 to 1897
- Richard W. Austin, U.S. congressman from 1909 to 1919
- Cynthia Bailey, model (Real Housewives of Atlanta)
- Loren C. Ball, amateur astronomer, discoverer of asteroid 34351 Decatur
- Taye Biddle, professional football player
- Lucas Black, actor
- Alonzo Boone, Negro League baseball pitcher and manager
- Marv Breeding, Major League baseball second baseman
- Cedrick Bridgeforth, Methodist bishop
- Deonte Brown, former University of Alabama lineman and national champion
- Anna Laura Bryan, Miss Alabama 2012
- Rufus Columbus Burleson, Baptist preacher and two-time Baylor University president
- Charlie Burse, blues musician
- Kendrick Burton, professional football player
- Jason Carthen, professional football player and public speaker
- Olandria Carthen, model, influencer, and television personality
- David Charles, neurologist
- Grace Curzon, Marchioness Curzon of Kedleston, second wife of Lord Curzon, Viceroy of India
- Pop Gates, professional basketball player and Harlem Globetrotter
- Chad Girodo, Major League baseball pitcher
- Eugene C. Gordon, founder of Decatur Land Improvement and Furnace Company
- Micky Hammon, convicted felon and former member of the Alabama House of Representatives
- Christopher Columbus Harris, U.S. congressman from 1914 to 1915
- Robin Henderson, associate director, Management, of the NASA Marshall Space Flight Center
- Richard Hendrix, professional basketball player
- Mae Jemison, first African American woman in space
- Dean Jones, actor
- Leslie Kelley, former New Orleans Saints linebacker
- Seth Kimbrough, professional BMX rider, former front man of Mortal Treason
- Gary Knotts, Major League baseball pitcher
- Alan Koch, Major League baseball pitcher
- Cricket Lee, entrepreneur and inventor
- Donald Lourie, College Football Hall of Fame quarterback and former president of the Quaker Oats Company
- Seybourn Harris Lynne, federal judge from 1946 to 1973
- Rolando McClain, National Football League linebacker
- Chuck Murphy, American Anglican bishop
- Arthur Orr, member of the Alabama Senate since 2006
- John O'Sullivan, conservative columnist and pundit
- Luther Patrick, U.S. congressman 1937 to 1943
- Josh Pearson, wide receiver and Super Bowl (LV) champion with the Tampa Bay Buccaneers
- Ray Pepper, Major League Baseball outfielder
- Benny Perrin, former St. Louis Cardinals safety
- Charles Redding Pitt, U.S. Attorney for the U.S. District Court for the Middle District of Alabama; Democratic politician
- Jerraud Powers, National Football League cornerback
- Andy Price, comic artist, known for illustrating My Little Pony: Friendship Is Magic
- Gary Redus, Major League baseball outfielder
- Kristopher Reisz, novelist
- Philip Rivers, National Football League quarterback
- Johnny Sandlin, musician, recording engineer, record producer
- Rip Sewell, Major League baseball pitcher
- Charles Christopher Sheats, U.S. congressman from 1873 to 1875
- George E. Spencer, U.S. Senator for Alabama from 1868 to 1879
- Perry Stephens, actor and singer
- Mandisa Stevenson, professional basketball player
- Reddy Steward, National Football League Corner back for the Dallas Cowboys.
- David Stewart, former Tennessee Titans offensive tackle
- Skip Stewart, aerobatic pilot
- Travis S. Taylor, aerospace engineer and subject of Rocket City Rednecks
- Gordon Terry, bluegrass and country music fiddler and guitarist
- Randy Thornhill, entomologist and evolutionary biologist
- Carson Tinker, long snapper for the Los Angeles Rams
- Judith Toups, birder and columnist for the Sun Herald of Biloxi
- Phil Waldrep, Southern Baptist preacher and minister
- Don Whitmire, College Football Hall of Fame offensive tackle
- Mildred Wolfe, artist
