= Kristopher Reisz =

American author (born 1979)

- Born: February 7, 1979 (age 47); Decatur, Alabama, U.S.
- Occupation: Novelist
- Writing career
- Genres: Urban Fantasy, Young adult
- Website: www.kristopherreisz.com

Kristopher Reisz (born February 7, 1979) is an American author known for his young adult novels.

== Early life ==
Reisz grew up in Decatur, Alabama. He became interested in writing during high school. In college, he reported for the student newspaper and edited the literary magazine, later recalling, "I set out to learn anything anyone could possibly teach me about being a writer." Reisz worked as a paramedic and in a psychiatric hospital.

== Work ==
Reisz published the short story "Special" in Cthulhu Sex Magazine in 2004, then his first novel Tripping to Somewhere in 2006. His second novel, Unleashed appeared in 2008, followed by the short story "Quiet Haunts" in Drops of Crimson online in 2009.

In 2010, Reisz published an illustrated free e-book Quiet Haunts and Other Stories, including his two previously published (and two unpublished) short stories.

== Reception ==
Reisz's writing has received recognition twice. In 2007, the New York Public Library chose Tripping to Somewhere as one of their "Books for the Teen Age." His second novel, Unleashed, was recognized by the Young Adult Library Services Association in its 2009 list of "Quick Picks for Reluctant Young Adult Readers."

Tripping to Somewhere received positive reviews. The Trades ' R.J. Carter gave a "B+" score, describing it as "heavy with teenage angst and nihilism, and lack[ing] any likeable heroes," and "a drug-filled idyll that blends Hunter S. Thompson with the works of comic book horror masters Alan Moore and Neil Gaiman", where "elements of the Norse Odin and Greek Orpheus also become evident as our two fugitives tumble pell-mell to the story's ultimate conclusion." Kimberley Pauley, writing for Young Adult Central, "really liked" the "unique" story, and recommended it for older young adult readers, noting that the "very intense," "gritty" fantasy and characters "stay with you."

== Bibliography ==
- Tripping to Somewhere (2006) Simon Pulse ISBN 978-1-4169-4000-5
- Unleashed (2008) Simon & Schuster, ISBN 978-1-4169-4001-2
- Quiet Haunts and Other Stories (2010)
