= Don Whitmire =

American football player and United States Navy admiral

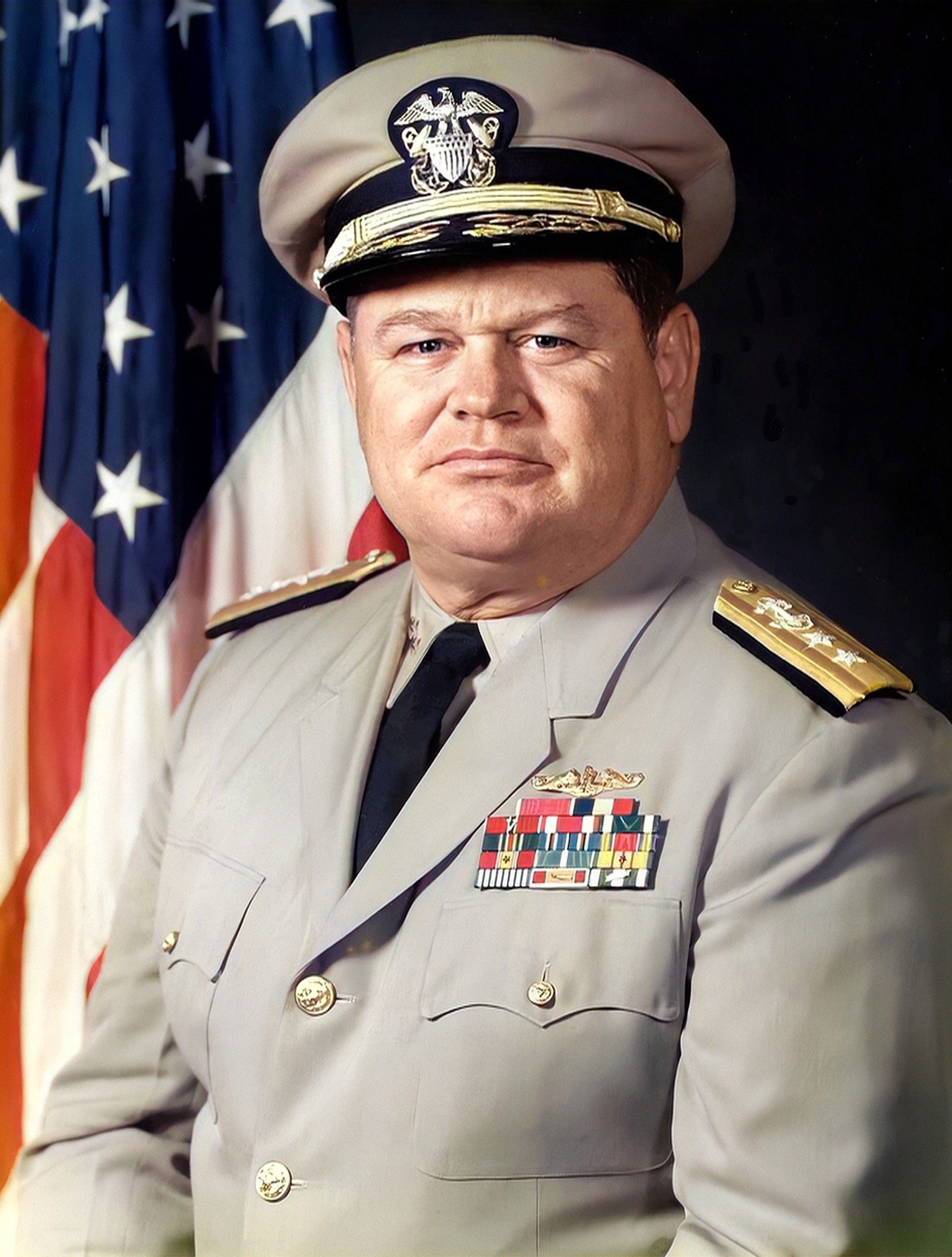
- Born: Donald Boone Whitmire; July 1, 1922; Giles County, Tennessee, U.S.
- Died: May 3, 1991 (aged 68); Annandale, Virginia, U.S.
- Spouse: Joan Corcoran
- Military career
- Allegiance: United States
- Branch: United States Navy
- Service years: 1942-1977
- Rank: Rear Admiral
- Nickname: "Big Daddy"
- Commands: USS Gudgeon (SS-567); Amphibious Squadron 1 Task Force 76
- Conflicts: World War II; Korean War; Vietnam War
- Awards: Audie Murphy Patriotism Award
- Football career

No. 70
- Position: Tackle

Personal information
- Listed height: 5 ft 11 in (1.80 m)
- Listed weight: 215 lb (98 kg)

Career information
- High school: Decatur (Alabama)
- College: Alabama; Navy
- NFL draft: 1944: 9th round, 82nd overall pick

Career history
- Drafted by Green Bay Packers (declined offer)

Awards and highlights
- Knute Rockne Trophy (1944); Unanimous All-American (1944); Consensus All-American (1943); First-team All-American (1942); 2× First-team All-Eastern (1943, 1944); First-team All-SEC (1942)
- College Football Hall of Fame

RADM Donald Boone Whitmire (July 1, 1922 – May 3, 1991) was a U.S. Navy officer and American football player who was drafted in the ninth round by the 1944 Green Bay Packers but choose to remain with the U.S. Navy.

Whitmire was born in Pulaski, Tennessee, the son of James Buford Whitmire Sr., who would later become the police chief in Decatur, Alabama, and Mary Whitmire (Ingram). He attended the University of Alabama from 1940 to 1942, where he was named to the Crimson Tide All-Time Cotton and Orange Bowl teams. He would leave UA to enlist in the Marine Corps following America's entry into WWII. Recognizing his value, Navy line coach Rip Miller recruited him to complete his schooling with the United States Naval Academy (USNA), where he won the Knute Rockne Trophy and the academy's Thompson Trophy. He also served as a brigade commander. He is one of only four college football players to ever be named as an All-American at two different schools, and would be inducted into the College Football Hall of Fame in 1956.

After his graduation from USNA in 1946, in the same class as future President Jimmy Carter, Whitmire was commissioned as an officer in the U.S. Navy, eventually retiring with the rank of rear admiral. Like Carter, Whitmire began his career as a submariner, where he commanded subs and a submarine division in the Atlantic. He served two tours in Vietnam, the first in command of an amphibious troop transport in 1967. He then went on to command an amphibious squadron in the Mediterranean.

Whitmire is best remembered as the commander of Task Force 76 in April 1975 during the Fall of Saigon. Task Force 76 provided logistical support to Operation Eagle Pull and Operation Frequent Wind, providing ground and air support to retreating American forces, and taking American diplomats, dependents, and Vietnamese allies aboard ships stationed just outside Saigon. U.S. and Vietnamese forces airlifted some 1,500 American diplomats and 5,500 Vietnamese and other allied citizens to Task Force vessels in the final 24 hours of the American withdrawal. The Task Force also supported a flotilla of former U.S. Navy and Coast Guard ships loaned to the Republic of Vietnam Navy, carrying some 30,000 RVNN personnel, families, and other dependents, and escorting them 1,000 miles across the China Sea to U.S. Naval Base Subic Bay, rather than surrendering them to the Vietnam People's Navy. In 1977, his last assignment prior to retiring from the Navy was serving on the Atlantic Fleet staff.

Whitmire was inducted into the Alabama Sports Hall of Fame in 1980. In 1984, he was presented with the Audie Murphy Patriotism Award by President Ronald Reagan.

After his death on May 3, 1991, he was buried at Arlington National Cemetery.

== Military awards ==
Whitmire's military decorations and awards:

| Top | Gold Submarine Warfare insignia | | |
| 1st Row | Legion of Merit | Navy and Marine Corps Medal | |
| 2nd Row | Bronze Star Medal with "V" device | Meritorious Service Medal | Navy and Marine Corps Commendation Medal |
| 3rd Row | Navy Meritorious Unit Commendation | American Campaign Medal | World War II Victory Medal |
| 4th Row | National Defense Service Medal with Service star | Korean Service Medal | Vietnam Service Medal with Service star |
| 5th Row | United Nations Service Medal Korea | Gallantry Cross Unit Citation | Vietnam Campaign Medal with 60– Device |
