= Phil Waldrep =

American minister

- Born: Morgan County, Alabama
- Education: University of Alabama
- Occupation: Minister
- Website: www.philwaldrep.org

Phil Waldrep is Southern Baptist preacher, evangelist, and author based in Decatur, Alabama. He is the Founder and President of Phil Waldrep Ministries, an evangelical nonprofit that organizes Christian conferences.

Waldrep was born in Morgan County, Alabama, near Decatur, Alabama. His father, Linnes Waldrep, was a factory worker, but he is the grandson and great-grandson of Baptist preachers. He began preaching at the age of 14. Waldrep is a graduate of Calhoun Community College, of the University of Alabama, and of Luther Rice College and Seminary. He and his wife, Debbie, have two children.

Waldrep founded Phil Waldrep Ministries, which organizes Christian conferences. On October 5, 2009, Waldrep launched a 25-minute radio program, Living with Joy! Radio, broadcast on 500 stations of CSN International in heard in 46 states.

Waldrep's 2002 book, Parenting Prodigals, offers guidance to parents whose children have rejected faith, with special attention to Christian parents whose children have not only left the faith, but who have also fallen prey to alcohol abuse, drug abuse and criminal activities. His advice to parents includes encouragement to "pray specifically," "love your child unconditionally," and "allow sin to run its course."

== Books ==
- Reaching Your Prodigal: What Did I Do Wrong? What Do I Do Now? Worthy Publishing, 2016. ISBN 978-1617956751
- The Grandparent Factor: Five Ways to make a Difference in the Life of Your Grandchild, Baxter Press, 2003. ISBN 978-1888237443
- Parenting Prodigals: Six Principles to Get Your Son or Daughter Back to God, Baxter Press, 2001. ISBN 978-1888237542
