= Eugene C. Gordon =

Major Eugene C. Gordon (1845 - 1913) was a railroad construction engineer, Confederate Officer in the Civil War and subsequently founded and led Decatur Land Improvement and Furnace Company, Inc. which developed the area near Decatur, Alabama which was for a period of time a separate municipality Albany, Alabama.

Gordon was descended from an ancient Scottish lineage, one of twelve, born on his father's plantation in Upson County, Georgia. Many Gordon family members fought in the Revolutionary War. Gordon and his family invested in a series of land developments and coal mines in Alabama, Tennessee and Georgia.

== Sources ==
- Eugene C. Gordon Major 25th Alabama Cavalry Battalion
- 1864 Attack on Washington, DC: A Day’s Difference
