= Alabama Jubilee Hot Air Balloon Classic =

Annual event on Memorial Day

Coordinates: 34°34′26″N 86°56′16″W

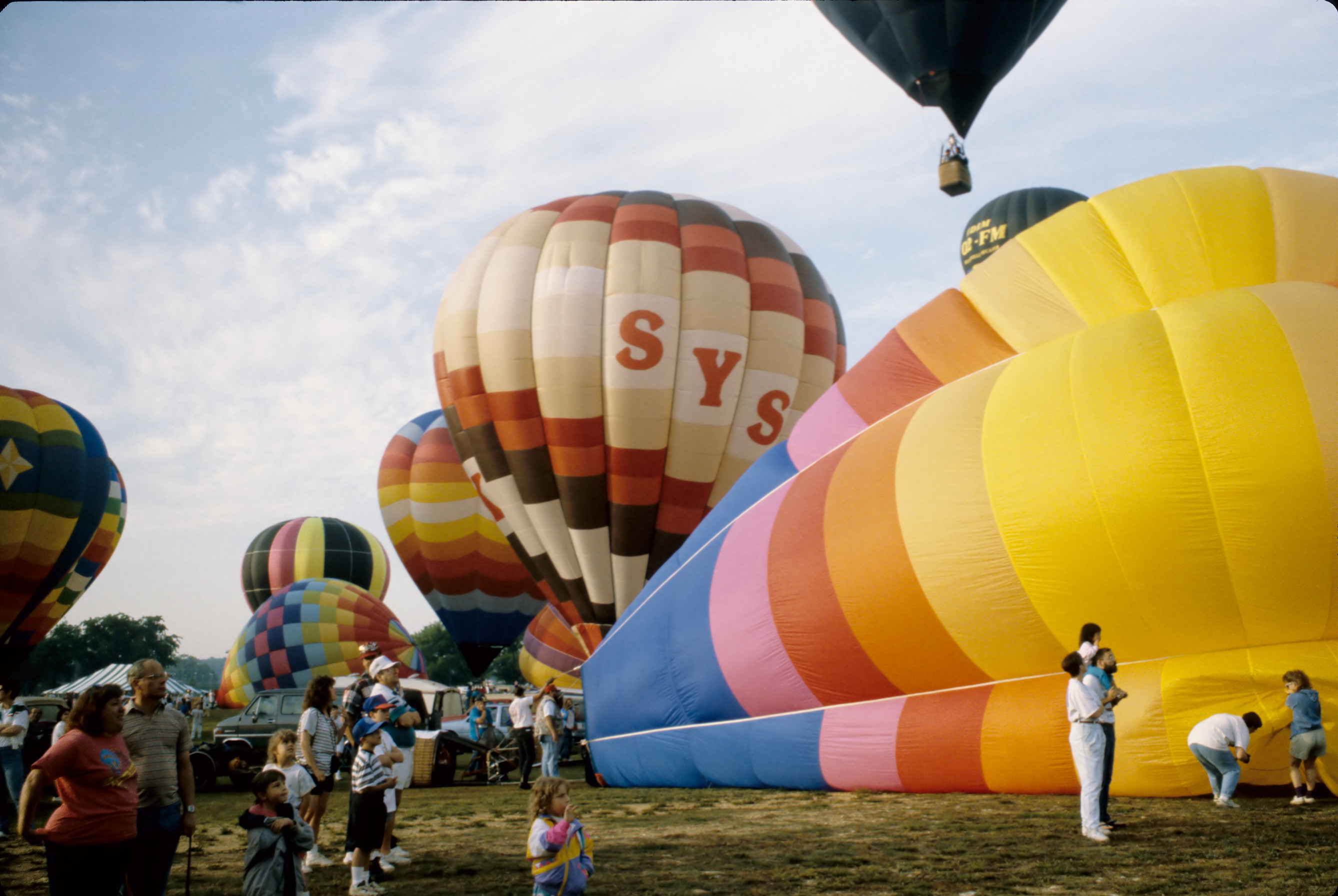
Spectators mingle with hot air balloons at the Alabama Jubilee circa 1990 while balloonists inflate their craft for the evening activities.

The Alabama Jubilee Hot Air Balloon Classic is held annually on Memorial Day weekend in Decatur, Alabama. Each year the Jubilee hosts about 60 local and national hot-air balloons at Point Mallard Park.

Public admission is free of charge, and several activities take place during the weekend. Below a partial listing of events that are part of each year's Jubilee:

- Fireworks Extravaganza
- Antique Tractor Show
- Classic Car Show
- Arts and Crafts
- Live Stage Entertainment
- Children's Area
- Food and Merchandise Vendors

The Alabama Jubilee is unique in that it allows for the crowd of around 50,000 to mingle with pilots and crews, while 7-story tall balloons inflate and float overhead. The Alabama Jubilee Hot Air Balloon Classic consists of three different balloon events:

- A Hare & Hound Race
- A Balloon Glow
- A Circumnavigational Task
- Tethered Balloon Rides

== History ==
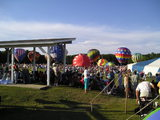
Hot air balloons inflating at the 2005 Alabama Jubilee

The Alabama Jubilee Hot Air Balloon Classic, one of the oldest hot-air balloon races in the mid-South, started in Decatur in 1978 with competition among 17 balloonists from Alabama, Kentucky, Ohio, Georgia, Mississippi and Louisiana. It was a showcase for the new Decatur balloon, one of the first to represent a city, and an event to kick off Alabama's tourism season. The Jubilee now draws, on average, about 60 pilots from some 20 states for two days of friendly competition during the annual Memorial Day holiday weekend.

The 2020 event went virtual, due to public gathering restrictions in Alabama caused by the COVID-19 pandemic.

== "The Ballooning Capital of Alabama" ==
The continued popularity of the Alabama Jubilee prompted the Alabama Legislature to designate the City of Decatur as the “Ballooning Capital of Alabama.”

The Jubilee has been named a Top 20 Tourism Event in the Southeast for May by the Atlanta-based Southeast Tourism Society.

== Location ==
The Alabama Jubilee is held on the grounds of Point Mallard Park, a municipal recreation complex that offers a 35-acre (140,000 m^{2}) water park featuring an aquatic center with a wave pool, Olympic-sized swimming pools, lazy river, and several water slides, as well as tennis courts, ball fields, hiking trails, campground, 18-hole championship golf course, indoor ice skating rink and recreation center.

== See also ==
- Hot air balloon festivals
