= Decatur Land Improvement and Furnace Company =

Decatur Land Improvement and Furnace Company, Inc. was a company which engaged in a planned urban development in the state of Alabama in the late nineteenth century. On January 11, 1887, as Decatur, Alabama was still rebuilding from the destructive results of the war and the outbreak, the Decatur Land Improvement and Furnace Company, Inc., was founded by Southerners Eugene C. Gordon, C.C. Harris, and W.W. Littlejohn, and Northerners Hiram Bond and William E. Forest M.D. of New York. Together they and others invested $7.5 million toward purchase and development of 5,600 acres (2,300 ha) of land southeast of the city. The company formed a new city as a means of reinventing Decatur as a progressive manufacturing and transportation center following the war. They named their new city New Decatur and gave it the nickname "The Chicago of the South," referencing its status as a transportation hub, and as a marketing tool toward Midwesterners. New Decatur was designed as a planned community with the help of famed landscape architect Nathan Franklin Barrett.

The company advertised this new development across the Northeast and Midwestern United States as "the healthiest city in the South," following the installation of a modern water and drainage system, which was thought to ward off disease. The new city saw an initial boom, but slowed soon after due to deteriorating economic conditions. Eventually, though, because of the city's industries and quality of life, many Americans began to move south to New Decatur and inhabit the city.

The founders together and separately were also involved with starting other businesses mills, banks insurance companies in Decatur and the region. Hiram Bond later became Chief Operating Officer of the Tennessee Coal, Iron and Railroad Company between 1889 and 1891 and was involved in the sale of tens of thousands of acres of resource lands in Tennessee held as an investment by the Decatur to that corporation.

== Sources ==
- New York Times: New life in the old towns of the New South
