= JHS =

JHS may refer to:

- Christogram (ΙΗΣ), derived from the first three letters of the Greek name of Jesus
- Jacksonville Historical Society, in Florida, United States
- Jhankot Sign Language, a village sign language of Nepal
- Jhansi Junction railway station (station code: VGLJ; formerly JHS), Uttar Pradesh, India
- JHS Pedals, a guitar effects pedals manufacturer
- Jordan–Hare Stadium, in Alabama, United States
- Journal of Hellenic Studies
- Sisimiut Airport, in Greenland
- Joint hypermobility syndrome, now known as hypermobility spectrum disorder
- Jalen Hood-Schifino, American professional basketball player

== Schools ==
- Junior high school

Individual schools

- Harry D. Jacobs High School, in Algonquin, Illinois, United States
- Jain Heritage School, in Bangalore, India
- Jaluit High School in Jaluit, Marshall Islands
- Jackson High School (disambiguation)
- Jacksonville High School (disambiguation)
- James Hornsby School, in Basildon, Essex, England
- Jamestown High School (disambiguation)
- Jasper High School (disambiguation)
- Jefferson High School (disambiguation)
- Jeffersonville High School, in Indiana, United States
- Jemison High School, in Alabama, United States
- Jenison High School, in Michigan, United States
- Jericho High School, in Nassau County, New York, United States
- Jesuit High School (disambiguation)
- Jimtown High School (Elkhart, Indiana), in the United States
- Johnsburg High School, in Illinois, United States
- Johnson High School (disambiguation)
- Johnston High School, in Iowa, United States
- Johnstown High School, in New York, United States
- Jonesboro High School (disambiguation)
- Joplin High School, in Missouri, United States
- Juanita High School, in King County, Washington, United States
- Juniata High School, in Juniata County, Pennsylvania, United States
- Juab High School, in Nephi, Utah, United States
- Jupiter Community High School, in Florida, United States
