= AJHS =

AJHS may refer to:

== Schools ==
- Abraham Joshua Heschel School, a Jewish day school in New York City
- Andrew Jackson High School (disambiguation)
- Ateneo de Manila Junior High School (AJHS) at Ateneo de Manila University, Quezon City, Manila, Luzon, Philippines"
- Austin Junior High School (AJHS), Decatur, Alabama, US; see Austin High School (Alabama)
- Aptakisic Junior High School, a school in Buffalo Grove, Illinois

== Other uses ==
- American Jewish Historical Society
- Australian Jewish Historical Society
- American Journal of Health-System Pharmacy

== See also ==
- AJH (disambiguation)
- JHS (disambiguation)
