= Entrekin =

Entrekin is a surname. Notable people with the name include:

- Alison Entrekin, Australian translator
- John Clay Entrekin (1844–1905), Ohio legislator
- Paul T. Entrekin (born 1954), American aviator
- Morgan Entrekin, American publisher
- Rachel Entrekin (born 1991), American ultramarathon runner

== See also ==
- Entriken
