= Daniel Levy (physician) =

Cardiologist

- Education: University of Pennsylvania; Boston University School of Medicine
- Scientific career
- Fields: cardiology
- Workplaces: Boston University School of Medicine; National Institutes of Health

Daniel Levy is an American cardiologist who is the director of the Framingham Heart Study at the National Heart, Lung, and Blood Institute, a division of the National Institutes of Health (NIH).

== Career ==
Levy received his B.A. from the University of Pennsylvania in 1976 and his M.D. from Boston University School of Medicine in 1980. He then completed his internal medicine residency at University Hospital, Boston, as well as a research fellowship in cardiology at Brigham and Women’s Hospital and Harvard School of Public Health. He began working for the Framingham Heart Study in 1984 and became its director in 1994. He is a Professor of Medicine at Boston University School of Medicine. He is known for his research on the epidemiology and genetics of heart failure and hypertension.

Levy has received two NIH Director’s Awards, as well as the American Heart Association’s Population Research Prize. He is a fellow of the American College of Cardiology and American Heart Association, as well as a member of the American Society of Hypertension and Heart Failure Society of America. He is the editor-in-chief of the journals Current Cardiovascular Risk Reports and the Journal of the American Society of Hypertension.

== Selected publications ==
- (with William P. Castelli) Cholesterol and Mortality: 30 Years of Follow-up From the Framingham Study (JAMA, 1987)
- (with Susan Brink) A Change of Heart: How the Framingham Heart Study Helped Unravel the Mysteries of Cardiovascular Disease (Alfred A. Knopf, 2005)
- 60 years studying heart-disease risk (Nature Reviews Drug Discovery, 2008)
