= Philip Rivers =

American football player (born 1981)

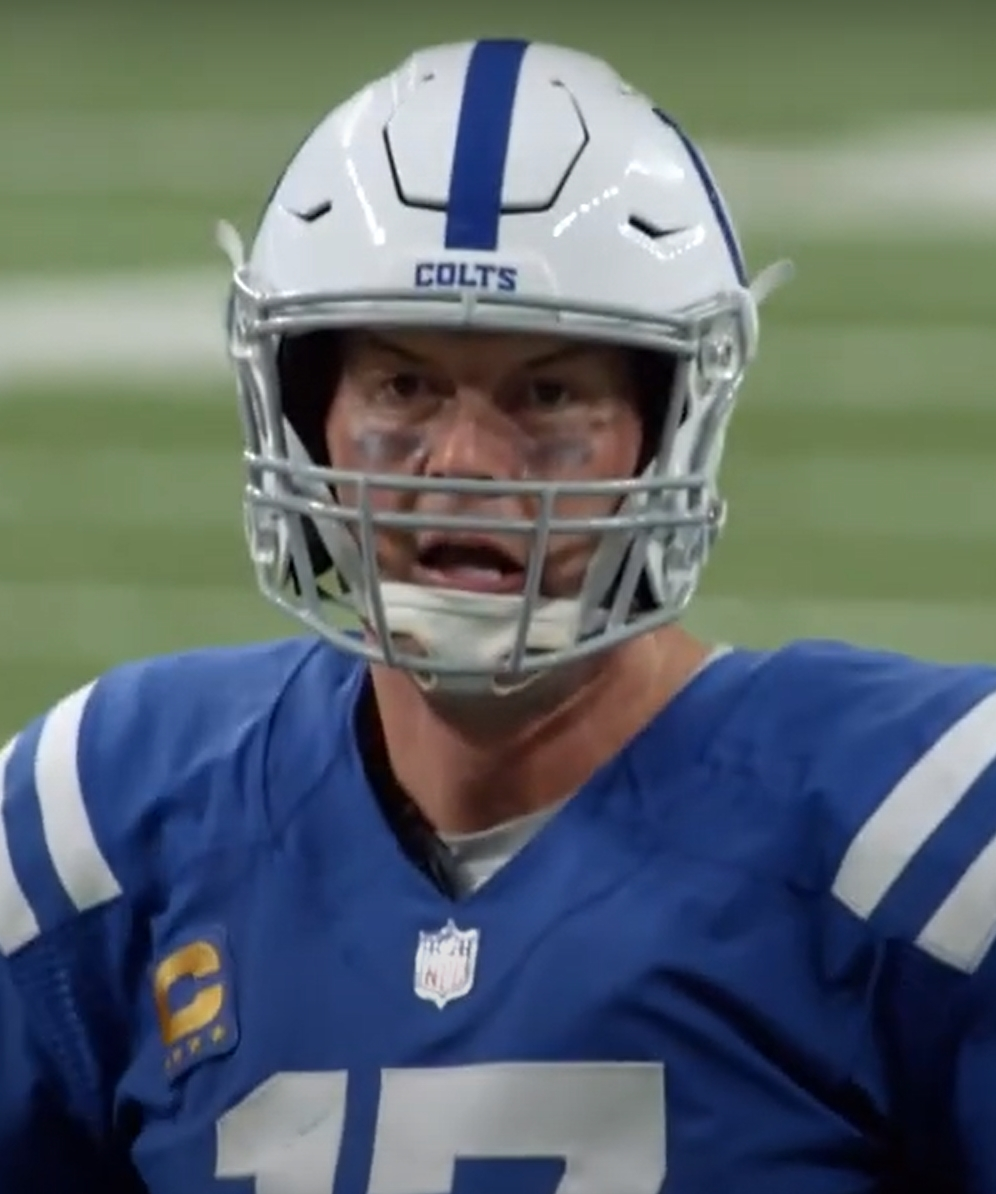
- Rivers with the Indianapolis Colts in 2020

NC State Wolfpack
- Title: Head coach

Personal information
- Born: December 8, 1981 (age 44); Decatur, Alabama, U.S.
- Listed height: 6 ft 5 in (1.96 m)
- Listed weight: 228 lb (103 kg)

Career information
- Position: Quarterback (No. 17)
- High school: Athens (Athens, Alabama)
- College: NC State (2000–2003)
- NFL draft: 2004: 1st round, 4th overall pick

Career history

Playing
- San Diego / Los Angeles Chargers (2004–2019); Indianapolis Colts (2020, 2025)

Coaching
- St. Michael Catholic HS (AL) (2021–2026) Head coach; NC State (2027–present) Head coach

Awards and highlights
- NFL Comeback Player of the Year (2013); 8× Pro Bowl (2006, 2009–2011, 2013, 2016–2018); NFL passing yards leader (2010); NFL passing touchdowns co-leader (2008); NFL passer rating leader (2008); NFL completion percentage leader (2013); San Diego Chargers 50th Anniversary Team; NCAA passer rating leader (2003); NCAA completion percentage leader (2003); ACC Athlete of the Year (2004); ACC Player of the Year (2003); ACC Offensive Player of the Year (2003); First-team All-ACC (2003); Second-team All-ACC (2002); ACC Rookie of the Year (2000); NC State Wolfpack No. 17 retired

Career NFL statistics
- Passing attempts: 8,226
- Passing completions: 5,335
- Completion percentage: 64.9%
- TD–INT: 425–212
- Passing yards: 63,984
- Passer rating: 95.0
- Stats at Pro Football Reference

Philip Michael Rivers (born December 8, 1981) is an American football coach and former professional quarterback who is the incoming head football coach for the NC State Wolfpack. Rivers played in the National Football League (NFL) for 18 seasons, primarily with the Chargers franchise (San Diego and Los Angeles). He played college football for NC State, winning ACC Player of the Year in 2003. Rivers was selected fourth overall in the 2004 NFL draft by the New York Giants, who traded him to the San Diego Chargers during the draft.

After spending his first two seasons as a backup, Rivers served as the Chargers' starting quarterback from 2006 to 2019. During his tenure, Rivers received eight Pro Bowl selections while leading the team to six postseason appearances and four division titles. He also helped the franchise win their first playoff game since 1994 and reach the AFC Championship Game during the 2007 season. Rivers joined the Indianapolis Colts in 2020, making a seventh playoff appearance before retiring. Following four years away from the NFL, Rivers signed with the Colts near the end of the 2025 season, where he played his final three games. A year later, he was named the head football coach at NC State.

Rivers ranks sixth all-time in passing yards and touchdowns, both of which are the highest among quarterbacks without Super Bowl appearances. He is also second all-time in consecutive regular season starts by a quarterback, having started every regular season game between 2006 and 2020. Rivers is considered among the greatest quarterbacks to have never played in a Super Bowl.

== Early life ==
Rivers was born in Decatur, Alabama, where his father, Steve, was the head coach of Decatur High's football team and his mother, Joan, was a teacher. As part of a fifth-grade project, he had to make a poster about his dreams and aspirations. On the poster, he pasted his face over that of a Minnesota Vikings player who had appeared on a cover of Sports Illustrated. Rivers's first start in an official game came in the seventh grade, in 1994. He has worn the number 17 jersey since the ninth grade, in honor of his father, who wore the same number in high school. After his dad got the head coaching job, Rivers played high school football at Athens High School in nearby Athens.

As Rivers's senior season unfolded, he established himself as the best prep passer in the state. Although he had offers from Auburn University and the University of Alabama, neither projected him as a starting quarterback. Rivers rejected them in order to go to a program where he would have more playing time. The first college to seriously recruit Rivers as a quarterback was North Carolina State University. Joe Pate convinced Rivers and his parents to consider graduating from high school in December 1999.

== College career ==
After high school, Rivers attended North Carolina State University in Raleigh, North Carolina, where he played for coach Chuck Amato's Wolfpack teams. Rivers enrolled in January and suited up for his first practice as a college quarterback in the spring of 2000.

=== 2000 season ===
As a freshman in 2000, Rivers led NC State to an 8–4 record, including a win against Minnesota in the MicronPC Bowl. Four of the Wolfpack's victories were comebacks. In his debut, a 38–31 double-overtime win over Arkansas State, he passed for 397 yards and three touchdowns. He directed a 74-yard game-tying drive as time expired. A week later, he threw for 401 yards in a 41–38 win against Indiana. The performance was highlighted by a timely 47-yard pass to future first round pick Koren Robinson with under a minute to go. Against Duke, NC State trailed 31–28 late in the fourth quarter when Rivers scored a rushing touchdown on a seven-yard run. Rivers threw for a season-high 413 yards to go along with three touchdowns and one interception For the season, Rivers passed for 3,054 yards and 25 touchdowns. He broke a half-dozen school passing marks, was ACC Rookie of the Week a record eight times, and earned honors as the conference Freshman of the Year. For the first time since Roman Gabriel ran the Wolfpack offense in the early 1960s, NC State had an All-American caliber quarterback.

=== 2001 season ===
As a sophomore in 2001, Rivers connected for 2,586 yards and 16 touchdowns. His 65.2 percent completion mark led the Atlantic Coast Conference (ACC). The Wolfpack finished the 2001 campaign at 7–4 and made a return trip to the Tangerine Bowl. The quarterback had a good game against Pitt in a 34–19 loss, passing for 189 yards and a touchdown.

=== 2002 season ===
In 2002, Rivers led the Wolfpack to victories in their first nine games, which led to a number #10 ranking in the AP Poll. It was the best start in the school's history. The season took a disappointing turn however when they lost three consecutive ACC contests, but NC State defeated Florida State by a score of 17–7 in their season finale, and received an invitation to play against Notre Dame in the Gator Bowl. Once again, Rivers delivered an MVP performance in the most important game of the year, pacing the Wolfpack to a dominating 28–6 win over Notre Dame. In the victory, Rivers was 23-of-37 for 228 passing yards and two passing touchdowns. The game would set up a remarkable year for Rivers in 2003.

=== 2003 season ===
As a senior in 2003, Rivers threw for 4,491 yards and 34 touchdowns in 12 games, capping his career as the most productive and durable quarterback in ACC history.

In the 2003 season, Rivers passed for over 300 yards eight times and 400 yards four times to go along with 29 touchdowns in the regular season. He led the NCAA in passer rating (170.5) and completion percentage (72%). He also led the ACC in passing attempts, completions, yards, and touchdowns. NC State finished with a 7–5 record to qualify for a bowl game.

Rivers's time at NC State had a positive ending, leading the Wolfpack to a 56–26 win over Kansas in his third Tangerine Bowl. In the victory, he threw for a career-high 475 yards and five touchdowns. Philip earned his second straight bowl MVP award. At the end of the season, Rivers was named ACC Player of the Year for the 2003 football season and ACC Athlete of the Year for 2003–04. He was considered a Heisman candidate during the season, but he was not invited to the Heisman Trophy presentation, where he finished in seventh place.

=== Legacy ===
During his collegiate career, Rivers broke almost every NC State and ACC passing record. He started 51 straight games and completed a conference record 1,147 passes on 1,710 attempts, with 95 touchdowns. His career culminated with an NCAA record 51st consecutive college start. The Wolfpack went to four consecutive bowl games under the leadership of Rivers, winning three of them. Rivers finished his career at NC State with 13,484 passing yards, 13th all-time among Division I quarterbacks (he finished in second place at the end of his collegiate career). He also threw 95 touchdown passes, which tied him with Kliff Kingsbury and Brady Quinn. Rivers's number was retired before his final home game at North Carolina State.

== Professional career ==
Pre-draft measurables
Height	Weight	Arm length	Hand span	40-yard dash	20-yard shuttle	Three-cone drill	Vertical jump	Broad jump	Wonderlic
6 ft 5 in (1.96 m)	229 lb (104 kg)	32 1/8 in (0.82 m)	9 1/4 in (0.23 m)	4.95 s	4.34 s	7.34 s	32.5 in (0.83 m)	9 ft 0 in (2.74 m)	30
All values from NFL Combine

Rivers was projected to be an early first-round pick in the 2004 NFL draft. However, despite Rivers's record of success in college and high accuracy (72 completion percentage for his senior season), questions about his lack of arm strength and his unorthodox side-arm throwing motion were concerns for some NFL general managers. The pre-draft consensus was that Rivers could be selected by the Pittsburgh Steelers with the 11th pick. The San Diego Chargers coveted Eli Manning and wanted to select him with their first round pick, which was also the first overall pick of the draft. However, after Manning indicated before the draft that he would not sign with them, Rivers was their first alternative because the Chargers' head coach at the time, Marty Schottenheimer, had coached him at the Senior Bowl and he liked what he saw. The Chargers agreed to a draft day deal with the New York Giants. San Diego selected Manning first, then traded him to New York for Rivers, selected fourth by the Giants, plus draft picks later used by the Chargers on future Pro Bowlers Shawne Merriman and Nate Kaeding.

Rivers was one of 17 quarterbacks taken in the 2004 NFL draft, along with Manning and the Steelers' Ben Roethlisberger. Rivers, Manning, and Roethlisberger would all enjoy lengthy and successful careers with the teams that signed them and have been compared favorably to the 1983 NFL draft, which included Hall of Fame quarterbacks John Elway, Jim Kelly, and Dan Marino. Unlike Manning and Roethlisberger, who have two championships each, Rivers never reached the Super Bowl. Nevertheless, he is the highest in touchdowns, completion percentage, TD–INT ratio, passer rating, and Pro Bowl selections out of the trio. Rivers also had the most passing yards and pass completions at the time of his first retirement.

=== San Diego / Los Angeles Chargers ===
==== 2004 season ====
In August 2004, Rivers signed a six-year, $40.5 million contract with the San Diego Chargers that included $14.5 million in signing bonuses. However, due to a protracted contract negotiation with the San Diego Chargers, Rivers only reported to the team during the last week of training camp, and incumbent Drew Brees retained his starting job. Rivers began the season as the Chargers' third quarterback option, behind Doug Flutie, and ahead of the fourth quarterback on the depth chart, Cleo Lemon. Unfortunately for Rivers, Brees went on to have a then-career year and was named to the NFL Pro Bowl while winning the NFL Comeback Player of the Year Award. Rivers received very limited playing time, playing in only two games. He only threw passes in the second half of the last game of the 2004 season, a victory over the Kansas City Chiefs, by which time the Chargers had already clinched a home playoff spot and the AFC West division title. In the victory, he threw his first touchdown pass to fellow rookie Malcom Floyd. He was not on the active roster for San Diego's Wild Card Round playoff loss to the New York Jets.

==== 2005 season ====
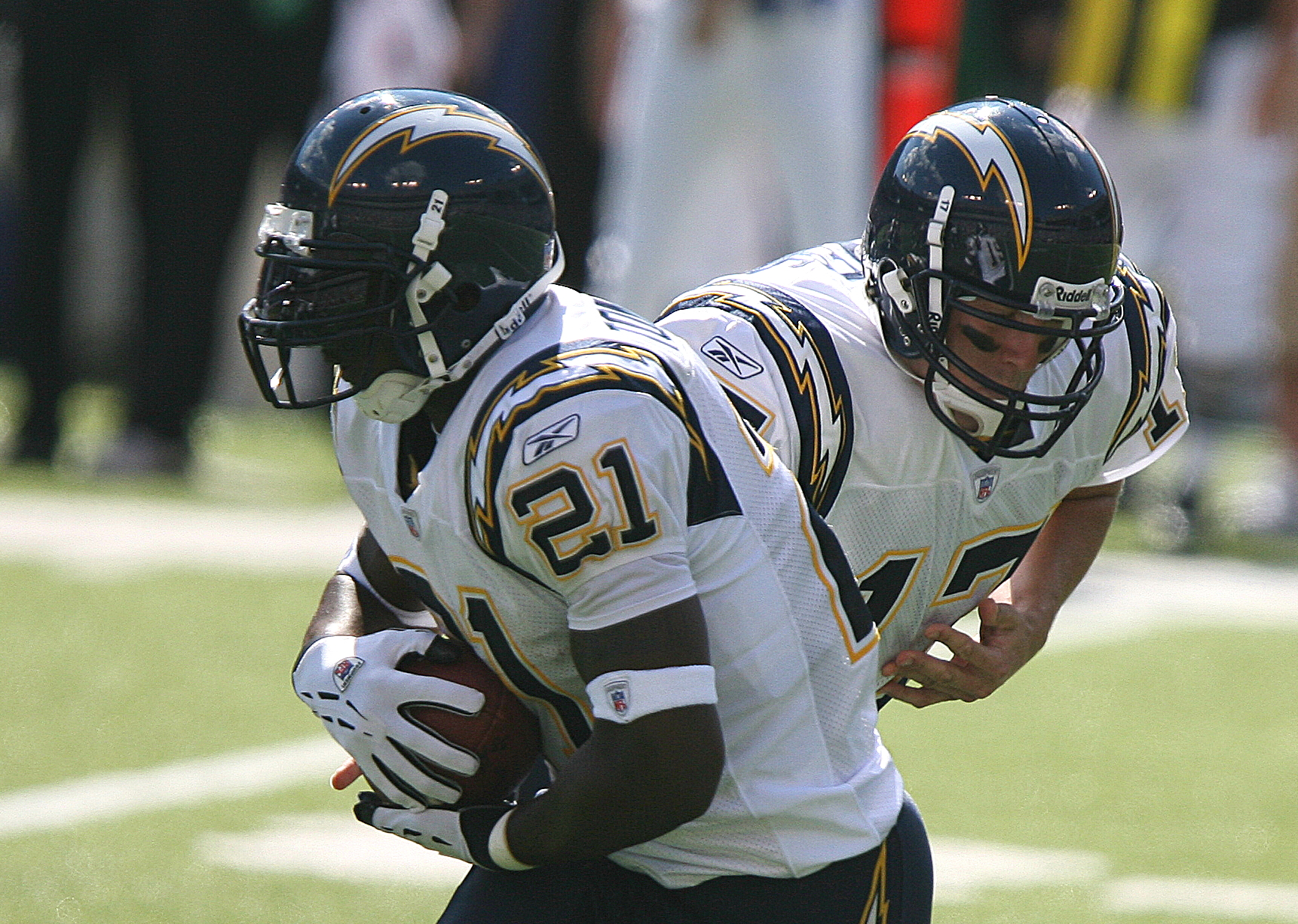
Rivers handing off to LaDainian Tomlinson in Baltimore in 2006

Rivers was promoted to second on the Chargers quarterback depth chart after Flutie was released. Rivers was unable to beat out Brees for the starting quarterback job in the Chargers' 2005 training camp and preseason. In the Chargers' final game of the 2005 season, at home in Qualcomm Stadium, Rivers entered the game after Brees dislocated his right shoulder late in the second quarter due to a hit from Denver Broncos safety John Lynch. Rivers completed 12 of 22 passing attempts for 115 yards with one interception and two fumbles. The Chargers lost to Denver, 23–7. However, Rivers led the Chargers on their only scoring drive that game, which culminated in a four-yard touchdown run by running back LaDainian Tomlinson.

==== 2006 season ====
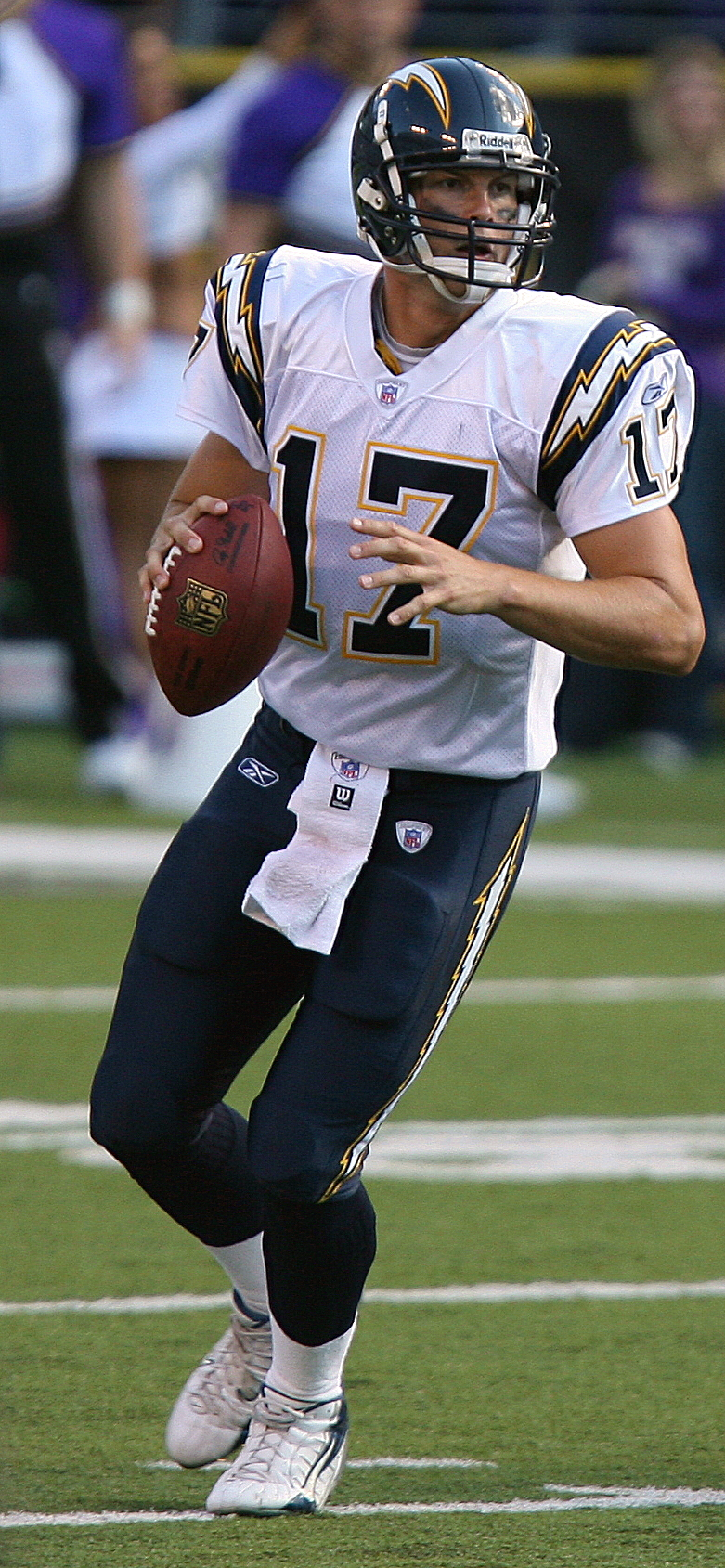
Rivers in 2006

After the 2005 season, Brees was not re-signed (partly due to the injury suffered in the Denver game) by the Chargers. Instead he signed a large contract that included sizeable guaranteed money with the New Orleans Saints, during the 2006 free agency period. Many doubted the Chargers' decision to change quarterbacks as they were a Super Bowl contender, believing that Rivers's inexperience would hinder them. Rivers was named the Chargers' starter going into training camp. Expectations were high for Rivers due to the large amount of talent on the Chargers' offense and the performance of his peers from the 2004 draft (Eli Manning and Ben Roethlisberger) as starters.

Football Outsiders projected that Rivers would become an NFL star before the 2006 season due to his spectacular completion percentage in college (72% as a senior). After just five NFL starts, Rivers was named the second best NFL quarterback under 25 years of age by Sports Illustrated.

On September 11, 2006, Rivers made his first NFL start against the Oakland Raiders. Rivers managed the game well despite only passing 11 times, but completed 8 passes, one for a touchdown, in a 27–0 rout of the Raiders. After his first game, Rivers led the league in quarterback rating with 133.9.

The fifth week of the season, the reigning Super Bowl champion Pittsburgh Steelers came to town, and Bill Cowher's defensive game plan revolved around stopping running back LaDainian Tomlinson. This game marked a turning point for Rivers, who, aided by head coach Marty Schottenheimer's opening of the playbook, led the team in a come-from-behind victory, throwing 24-of-37 for 242 yards and two touchdowns, winning 23–13.

On November 12, 2006, Rivers had the best game of his young career and led the Chargers to an improbable comeback on the road against the Cincinnati Bengals. Down 28–7 at halftime, Rivers led the Chargers on six drives culminating in touchdowns. After driving in for the Chargers first touchdown after halftime, Nick Hardwick, the Chargers' center, reminisced about Rivers, mimicking his southern drawl, "He's yelling 'Y'all don't think we're out of this' to the Bengals. When he said that, I said, 'Shoot, I guess we ain't out of this. Right on.'" He threw for 337 yards and three touchdown passes, while LaDainian Tomlinson scored three of their four rushing touchdowns. San Diego outscored Cincinnati 42–13 in the second half, winning the game 49–41, matching the largest comeback in franchise history from 23 years before for the Chargers.

The following week, against what was considered at the time to be a strong Denver Broncos defense, the Chargers became the first team in NFL history to win back-to-back road games after trailing by 17 or more points and also the first team to win four straight when allowing at least 27 points in each game. Rivers led several 4th quarter comebacks in 2006, and posted the league's highest 4th quarter quarterback rating. His performance over the season led to his selection to the 2007 Pro Bowl. Rivers helped lead the Chargers to the highest-scoring offense in the NFL. After a 14–2 season the Chargers had home field advantage and were set to play the New England Patriots in the Divisional Round of the playoffs. However, the Patriots won that game 24–21, and Schottenheimer was fired amid conflicts with team president Dean Spanos.

==== 2007 season ====
Norv Turner took over as head coach of the Chargers in 2007. After a 1–3 start, the Chargers turned their season around, finishing 11–5 and winning the AFC West for the second straight year. Rivers finished the season with 3,152 passing yards, 21 touchdowns, and 15 interceptions.

The Chargers won their first two playoff games since the 1994 season, beating the Tennessee Titans in the Wild Card Round and the Indianapolis Colts in the Divisional Round before falling to the New England Patriots in the AFC Championship Game 21–12. In the 2007 AFC Championship Game, Rivers's was lauded by his teammates and the press for playing the entire game with a torn anterior cruciate ligament, which later required surgery and was ranked among the NFL Top 10 Gutsiest Performances. Chris Harry of the Orlando Sentinel said "I don't think anyone will ever accuse Philip Rivers of being soft." Kevin Acee of The San Diego Union-Tribune said, "To go out there and put his knee, and ultimately his career, on the line. It has to go down as one of the gutsiest performances."

==== 2008 season ====
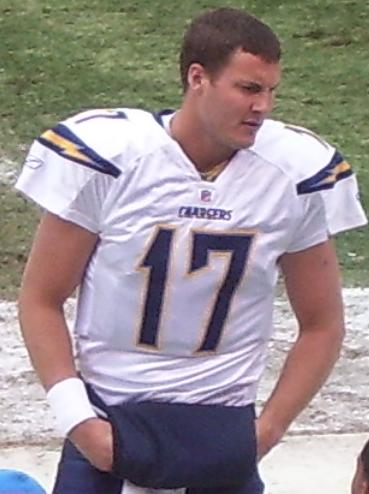
Rivers in Kansas City in 2008

In 2008, Rivers led the NFL in multiple categories including touchdown passes (34), passer rating (105.5), yards per pass attempt (8.4), and adjusted yards per attempt (8.8). In Week 2, against the Denver Broncos, he had a season-high 377 passing yards, three touchdowns, and one interception in the 39–38 loss. On December 28, 2008, Rivers set the Chargers team record for touchdown passes in a season with 34, a record previously held by Dan Fouts, who had 33 in 1981. After a 4–8 start, Rivers threw 11 touchdown passes and one interception to win the final four games of the season, winning the AFC West division on a season-finale 52–21 tie-breaking win over the Denver Broncos. On January 3, 2009, in the Wild Card Round, the San Diego Chargers defeated the Indianapolis Colts to advance to the AFC Divisional Playoff. Rivers led the Chargers down the field down three points with under two minutes left. He set up Nate Kaeding for a game-tying field goal that would lead to overtime, where the Chargers would go on to win 23–17, thanks to a Darren Sproles touchdown. In the Divisional Round 35–24 loss to the Pittsburgh Steelers, Rivers played well, throwing for over 300 yards and three touchdowns, but was sacked four times and threw an interception. They possessed the ball for only 17 seconds during the third quarter and had only 15 yards rushing.

==== 2009 season ====
On August 24, 2009, Rivers signed a six-year, $92 million contract extension with the Chargers, with approximately $38 million guaranteed. Rivers was voted into his second career Pro Bowl on December 29. He ended the season with a passer rating of 104.4, the third highest in the NFL, after passing for 4,254 yards, 28 touchdowns, and only nine interceptions. For the second consecutive year, he led the NFL in yards per attempt (8.8) and adjusted yards per attempt (9.1). He led the Chargers to the second seed in the AFC with a 13–3 record, tied for second best in the NFL. In the Divisional Round, Rivers was 27–40 for 298 yards while rushing and throwing for a touchdown and was intercepted twice in the 17–14 loss to the New York Jets.

==== 2010 season ====
Rivers led the league in passing yards, throwing for a career-high 4,710 yards. The Chargers started off the year slowly again at 3–5 and finished a disappointing 9–7 and their four-year reign as AFC West champions ended while they missed the playoffs. In Week 3, against the Seattle Seahawks, Rivers threw for 455 yards and two passing touchdowns in a losing effort 20–27. These 455 yards broke the franchise single-game record for most passing yardage, previously held by Dan Fouts, who had 444 in 1982. Rivers recorded 431 and threw two passing touchdowns, but lost to the Oakland Raiders in Week 5. In Week 8, Rivers threw for 305 yards, with two passing touchdowns and one interception in a 33–25 win against the Tennessee Titans, extending his active player-leading streak to 21 games with a touchdown thrown and giving him the record for most passing yards (2,649) ever after 8 games, passing Fouts' previous record (2,580). Rivers threw for four passing touchdowns, two to backup tight end Randy McMichael and the other two to rookie receiver Seyi Ajirotutu in a comeback 29–23 victory over the Houston Texans. The Chargers' top receivers Gates (torn plantar fascia), Vincent Jackson (suspended), Malcom Floyd (hamstring), and Legedu Naanee (hamstring) did not play in the game. Rivers lost his first ever game in December, a 13–28 loss at home against the Raiders. Rivers was invited to the 2011 Pro Bowl, his fourth invite overall, and started in place of an injured Tom Brady. It was the first time he played in a Pro Bowl, twice missing previous games due to injury and once for the birth of his child in the 2010 Pro Bowl. Rivers was named the quarterback in the 2010 NFL Alumni Player of the Year Awards over Brady, who was unanimously named The Associated Press 2010 Most Valuable Player. He was ranked 26th by his fellow players on the NFL Top 100 Players of 2011.

==== 2011 season ====
Entering the 2011 season, Nick Canepa of the San Diego Union-Tribune called Rivers a "better quarterback" than Fouts, a first-ballot Hall of Fame quarterback. Canepa cited Rivers "[completing] passes to an astounding 17 different receivers" in 2010, amid the injuries to Chargers receivers, and his then 55–25 record as a starter compared to 86–84–1 for Fouts. He also noted, "Fouts made more mistakes than Rivers." Rivers had completed 63.7 percent of his 2,455 passes with 58 interceptions and a 97.2 passer rating, while Fouts was successful on 58.8 percent of his 5,604 attempts with 242 interceptions and an 80.2 rating. Rivers had never thrown more than two interceptions in a game, including seven playoff games. His passer rating was the highest in league history, and he had the second-best touchdown-to-interception ratio of all-time (136/58).

Rivers and the Chargers started out the season with a 24–17 win over the Minnesota Vikings. Rivers had 335 passing yards and two touchdowns thrown to fullback Mike Tolbert but also threw two interceptions. Rivers and the Chargers lost 35–21 in Foxboro to the New England Patriots in Week 2. Rivers threw for 378 passing yards and had two touchdown passes to Vincent Jackson but also threw two interceptions again. Rivers threw two interceptions for the third game in a row as the Chargers held off the winless Kansas City Chiefs in Week 3, 20–17. In Week 4, the Chargers beat the winless Miami Dolphins 26–16, and Rivers threw a 55-yard touchdown to Vincent Jackson. In Week 5, Rivers threw for 250 yards and a touchdown pass to Malcom Floyd. He added a rushing touchdown as well. Despite two turnovers by him, the Chargers held off the Denver Broncos by a score of 29–24.

Rivers struggled in Week 7 after the bye. Rex Ryan's New York Jets limited Rivers to 179 passing yards and two interceptions. He did throw a touchdown to Antonio Gates, his first of the year. The Chargers lost 23–20 to the Chiefs in overtime on Halloween. Rivers put up 369 yards, but had two interceptions and a crushing fumble. This fumble occurred while Rivers was kneeling to set up a potential game-winning field goal with the game tied at 20. The Chiefs went on to win 23–20 in overtime. This loss, more specifically the fumbled kneel, was seen as the first domino to fall at the end of the season, as the Chargers, Raiders, and Broncos all finished 8–8, but the Broncos won the AFC West over both San Diego and Oakland due to tiebreakers. Rivers's poor performance during the 2011 season led to media speculation that he may have been suffering from an undisclosed injury. His former teammate, LaDainian Tomlinson, speculated that Rivers might be distracted by the burden of being the Chargers' star player. Rivers had 385 yards passing and added four touchdowns, but threw three interceptions against the defending champion Green Bay Packers. Rivers threw for 274 passing yards and an interception and a fumble in a 24–17 Week 10 loss against the Oakland Raiders. He did however, throw two passing touchdowns to rookie Vincent Brown. Rivers threw for 280 yards and two passing touchdowns in a 31–20 loss to the Chicago Bears. He added 2 more interceptions thrown. The touchdown passes went to Antonio Gates and Vincent Jackson. The Chargers lost 16–13 in overtime to Tim Tebow and the Broncos. Rivers threw for 188 yards and a touchdown to Antonio Gates. The Chargers finally won a game in Week 13, dominating the Jacksonville Jaguars 38–14. Rivers finished with 294 passing yards and 3 touchdowns. Rivers and the Chargers dominated the Buffalo Bills in Week 14, winning 37–10. Philip threw for 240 yards and 3 touchdowns, 2 to Antonio Gates, and the other to Patrick Crayton. Rivers and the Chargers dominated the Baltimore Ravens in Week 15. Philip had 270 yards and a touchdown to Malcom Floyd in a 34–14 stomping. Rivers and the Chargers struggled in Week 16. On Christmas Eve, the Chargers fell 38–10 in Detroit to the Lions. Rivers had 299 passing yards and a touchdown, but two interceptions.

Rivers concluded the season by throwing for 310 passing yards and 3 touchdowns, which were received by Floyd, Jackson, and Gates, in a 38–26 win against the Raiders, ending the Raiders' playoff hopes that season. He was named to the Pro Bowl for his 2011 season. He was ranked 61st by his fellow players on the NFL Top 100 Players of 2012.

==== 2012 season ====
The Chargers began the 2012 season with a 3–1 record for the second consecutive season. In a 37–20 win over the Kansas City Chiefs in Week 4, Rivers started his 100th career game, which was also his 100th consecutive start. On November 1, in the second game against the Kansas City Chiefs, he was 18-of-20 passes to earn a career-high 90% completion percentage in the 31–13 victory. Rivers became the seventh fastest quarterback in NFL history to reach 25,000 career yards. With a weak offensive line that season, Rivers was frequently forced to scramble and was sacked 49 times and hit on 70 other plays, contributing to his 22 turnovers—47 over the previous two seasons. Rivers finished the season with 3,606 passing yards, 26 touchdowns, and 15 interceptions. The Chargers' 7–9 record was the first losing season in Rivers's career, and the team's first since 2003. They missed the playoffs for the third straight season, leading to the firing of Turner and general manager A. J. Smith.

==== 2013 season ====
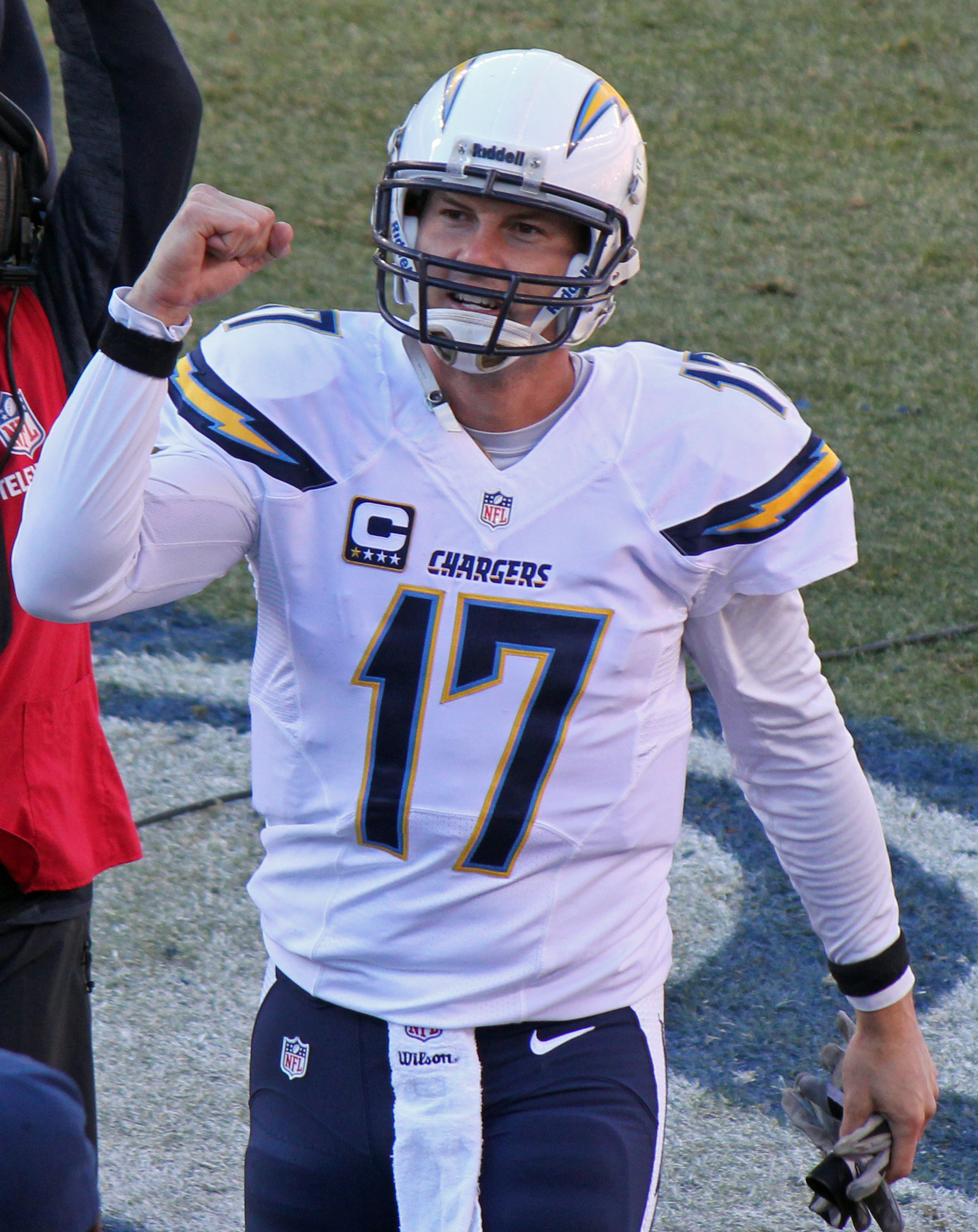
Rivers in Denver during the playoffs, January 2014

Rivers's combined 35 interceptions the two previous seasons led many to wonder whether he was injured or if his career was on the decline. Only two offensive coaches returned in 2013 in an overhauled coaching staff led by new head coach Mike McCoy, and a revamped offensive system had Rivers release the ball earlier and taking what opposing defenses conceded. In their Week 2 win over the Philadelphia Eagles, he threw for 419 yards and three touchdowns. In their Week 4 win over the Dallas Cowboys, Rivers set an NFL record for completion percentage (83%) for a quarterback who also threw for over 400 yards (401), three touchdowns, and one interception. In Week 7, Rivers surpassed 30,000 career yards passing. Rivers was also selected to the Pro Bowl for the fifth time in his career. In Week 17, against the Kansas City Chiefs, Rivers led a fourth quarter and overtime comeback to win the game, and clinch the 6th seed in the AFC playoffs.

During the Chargers season-ending four-game winning streak, Rivers completed 67.3 percent of his passes with nine touchdowns and a 142.6 rating. He finished the season completing 378 of 544 passes (69.5 percent) for 4,478 yards, 32 touchdowns and just 11 interceptions; his 105.5 passer rating tied his career high from 2008. With the Chargers having a capable running attack, an adjusted offensive line, and an improved defense, Rivers was not pressured to force his throws, and he led all quarterbacks in the league with a 49.4 third-down conversion rate when passing. He led the Chargers to a 27–10 win in the Wild Card Round against the Cincinnati Bengals before losing to the eventual AFC champion Denver Broncos in the Divisional Round, 24–17. He was named Comeback Player of the Year by both Associated Press (AP) and Pro Football Writers Association (PFWA). He was ranked 34th by his fellow players on the NFL Top 100 Players of 2014.

==== 2014 season ====
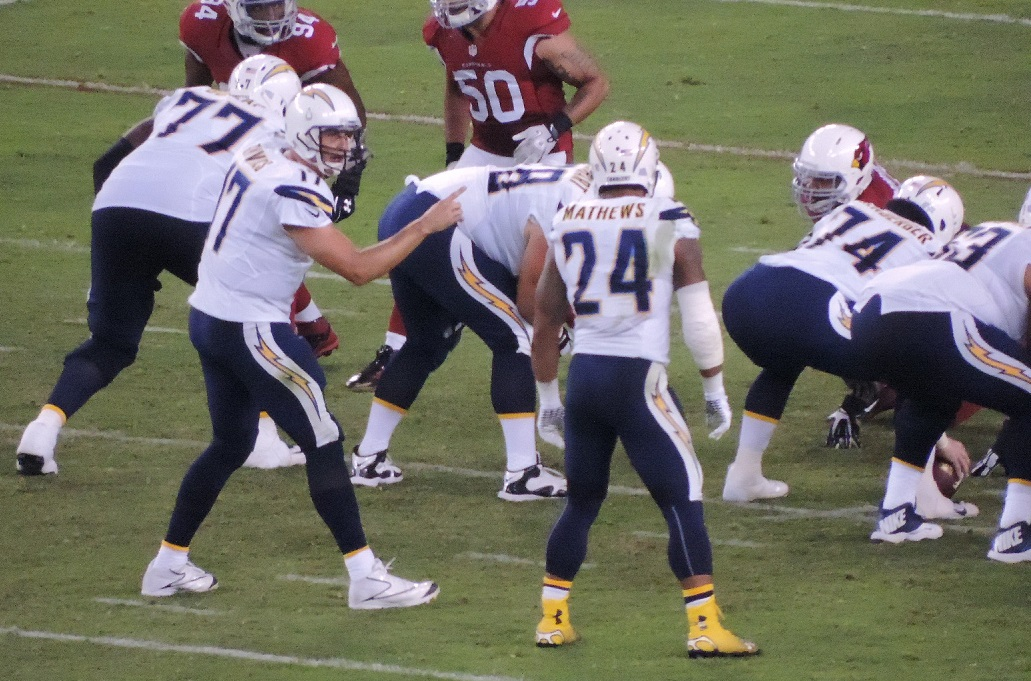
Rivers against the Arizona Cardinals in the 2014 season opener

The Chargers in 2014 lost their final game of the season when a win would have qualified them for the playoffs. Rivers was sacked a career-high seven times in the loss. For the season, he was voted by the Chargers as their MVP after finishing with 4,286 yards, 31 touchdowns, and 18 interceptions. It was the sixth season in which he passed for over 4,000 yards. During Weeks 2–6, he became the first NFL player ever to have a passer rating over 120 for five consecutive games. Later in the season, Rivers suffered from sore ribs and a back injury, but he denied that they affected his performance. His 71.2 rating in December was his lowest in a single month since November 2007 (68.8). He finished the 2014 season with 4,286 passing yards, 31 touchdowns, and 18 interceptions. He was ranked 43rd by his fellow players on the NFL Top 100 Players of 2015.

==== 2015 season ====
On August 15, 2015, the Chargers and Rivers agreed to a four-year, $84 million contract extension. Rivers started the 2015 season with 403 passing yards, two touchdowns, and two interceptions in the 33–28 victory over the Detroit Lions. On September 20, Rivers threw his 255th touchdown pass as a Charger, passing Dan Fouts as the franchise leader in touchdown passes. On October 18, in a game against the Green Bay Packers, Rivers set franchise records with 503 passing yards, 43 completions, and 65 attempts. In Week 12, against the Jacksonville Jaguars, he had 300 passing yards and season-high four passing touchdowns. The Chargers finished with a 4–12 record, last in the AFC West, their worst record since 2003. The Chargers went winless against divisional opponents for the first time since 1984. However, the Chargers did manage a 30–14 victory. against the Miami Dolphins during Week 15 at home. After the game, Rivers and several other Chargers players returned to the field to sign autographs for the fans, as they were unsure if it would be the team's final time playing in San Diego. Rivers would gift the shoes he wore to two fans in the stadium to show his appreciation. The team would ultimately stay in the city the following season.

Despite the disappointing season, Rivers set career highs and franchise records with 437 pass completions on 661 pass attempts and 4,792 passing yards, which ranked second among NFL quarterbacks in 2015. He finished 11 yards short of breaking the franchise single-season passing yards record held by Fouts. Rivers was invited to the 2016 Pro Bowl as an alternate but declined the invitation, citing personal reasons. He was ranked 46th on the NFL Top 100 Players of 2016.

==== 2016 season ====
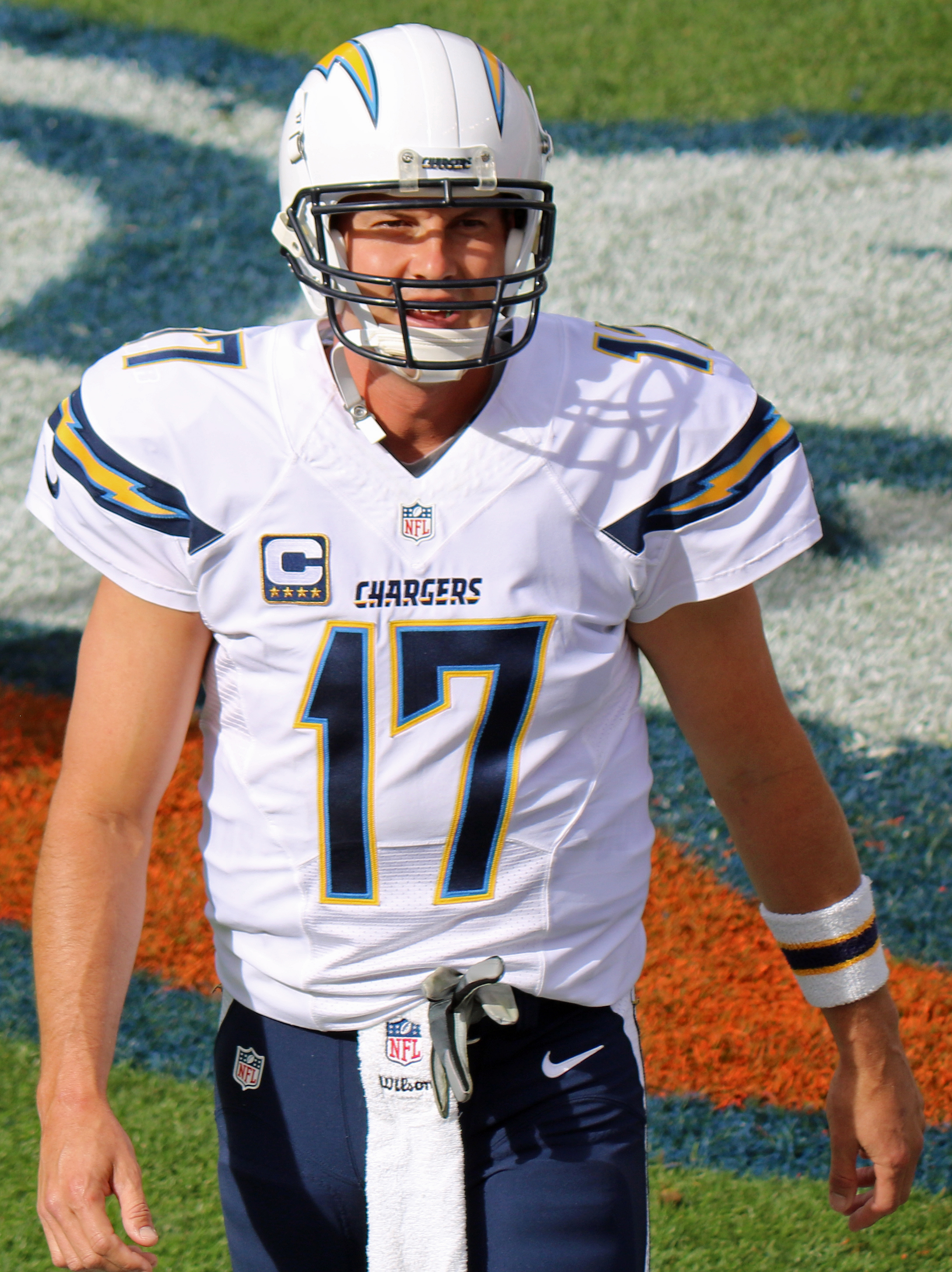
Rivers in Denver in 2016

Rivers and the Chargers started the 2016 season with a 1–4 record. In that stretch, Rivers passed for four touchdowns in two separate games. On October 13, 2016, in Week 6, Rivers passed Fouts to become the Chargers' all-time passing yards leader. In Week 7, against the Atlanta Falcons, he had a season-high 371 passing yards, one touchdown, and one interception in the 33–30 victory. Following the win over the Falcons, the Chargers alternated losses and wins until Week 13, where they had a five-game losing streak to end the season. Rivers finished the season with nine consecutive games throwing for at least touchdowns. Despite throwing for 33 touchdowns, Rivers threw a career-high and league-leading 21 interceptions and completed only 60.4 of his passes, the second worst of his career. Rivers posted a rating of 87.9, also the second worst of his career. These struggles resulted in the Chargers finishing 5–11 and last in the division for the second straight year. He was ranked 73rd by his fellow players on the NFL Top 100 Players of 2017.

==== 2017 season ====
The Chargers relocated to Los Angeles in the off-season and started the 2017 season with some tough results. In Week 1, against the Denver Broncos, he had 192 passing yards, three touchdowns, and one interception in a narrow 24–21 loss. The game was lost when Chargers' kicker Younghoe Koo missed a game-tying field goal. In the next game, a narrow 19–17 loss to the Miami Dolphins, he had 331 passing yards and a touchdown. Rivers struggled in the next game, a 24–10 loss to the Kansas City Chiefs, with three interceptions. The Chargers' hard luck continued in the next game, a narrow 26–24 loss to the Philadelphia Eagles. In the loss, Rivers had 347 passing yards and two touchdowns. After their 0–4 start, the Chargers put together a three-game winning streak. Following those two victories, the Chargers dropped their next two games before starting a four-game winning streak in Week 11. During that winning streak, in Week 12 against the Dallas Cowboys, Rivers finished with 434 passing yards and three passing touchdowns as the Chargers won 28–6. It was the first time the Chargers played on Thanksgiving since 1969. His performance in Week 12 earned him AFC Offensive Player of the Week. On December 19, 2017, Rivers was named to his seventh Pro Bowl along with his top receiver Keenan Allen. In Week 17, Rivers became the ninth quarterback in NFL history to reach 50,000 career passing yards. In that game, he completed 28 of 37 passes for 387 yards and three touchdowns in a 30–10 win over the Raiders, earning him his second AFC Offensive Player of the Week of the season. Overall, Rivers had 4,515 passing yards, 28 touchdowns, and ten interceptions in the 2017 season. He helped lead the Chargers to a 9–7 season. Despite having their first winning season since 2014, the Chargers failed to make the playoffs. He was ranked 56th by his fellow players on the NFL Top 100 Players of 2018.

==== 2018 season ====
On September 9, 2018, Rivers threw for 424 yards and three touchdowns in the season-opening 38–28 loss to the Kansas City Chiefs, eclipsing 400 yards in a single game for the 10th time in his career. The 424 yards was the most Rivers has thrown for in any of his season openers. He helped lead the Chargers to first win of the season in the following game against the Buffalo Bills. After a 35–23 loss to the Los Angeles Rams in Week 3, Rivers helped lead the Chargers to a four-game winning streak where he threw for over 300 yards twice and had nine passing touchdowns to two interceptions. After a 29–27 win over the San Francisco 49ers, Rivers passed John Elway for eighth-most passing yards in NFL history. In Week 9, against the Seattle Seahawks, Rivers made his 200th consecutive start. In a Week 11 loss to the Denver Broncos, he passed for 401 yards, two touchdowns, and two interceptions. In Week 12, against the Arizona Cardinals, saw Rivers tie Ryan Tannehill for most consecutive completions, with 25. Unlike Tannehill, he did it in one game and finished with an NFL-record one incompletion in 29 attempts, for a record 96.55%. He finished the game with 259 passing yards and three touchdowns in a 45–10 rout of the Arizona Cardinals, earning AFC Player of the Week honors. On December 13, in a game against the Chiefs, Rivers led the Chargers back from a 14-point deficit to win the game by a score of 29–28 on a two-point conversion to wideout Mike Williams. It was the Chargers first win against the Chiefs after nine straight losses and secured their first playoff berth since 2013. Philip Rivers eclipsed 4,000 yards, becoming the third quarterback in NFL history to reach 4,000 yards in 10 seasons or more, joining Peyton Manning and Drew Brees. Overall, Rivers finished the 2018 season with 4,308 yards, 32 touchdowns, and 12 interceptions. The Chargers finished with a 12–4 record and returned to the playoffs for the first time since the 2013 season. As the #5-seed, the Chargers faced off against the AFC North champion Baltimore Ravens in the Wild Card Round. Rivers passed for 160 yards as the Chargers defeated the Ravens by a score of 23–17. In the Divisional Round against the New England Patriots, Rivers passed for 331 yards, three touchdowns, and one interception as the Chargers fell 41–28. He was ranked 17th by his fellow players on the NFL Top 100 Players of 2019.

==== 2019 season ====
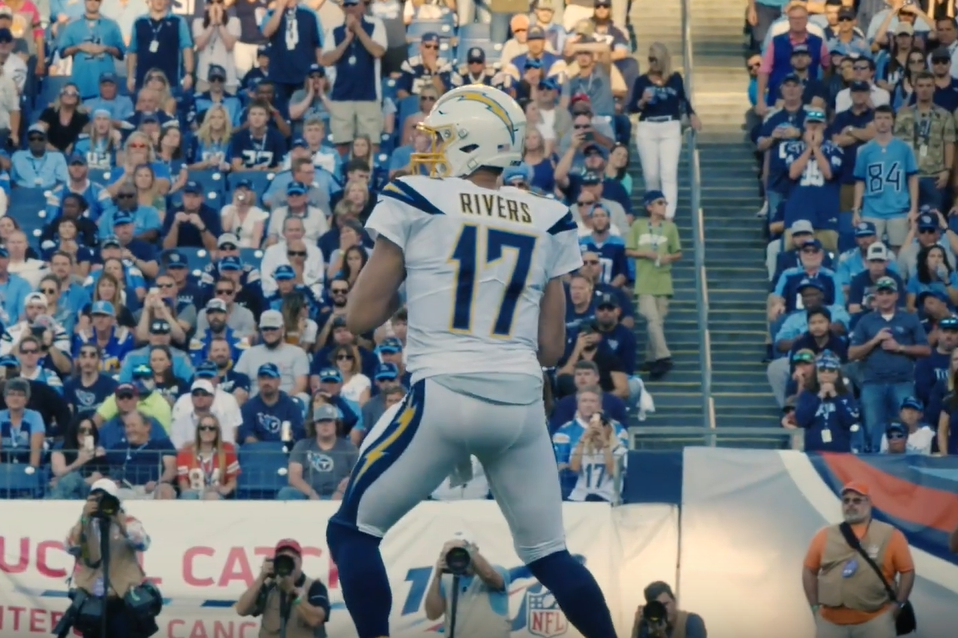
Rivers in a game against the Tennessee Titans

In the 2019 season, Rivers had eight games with over 300 passing yards and seven total with a passer rating over 100. However, the Chargers faced numerous close losses. In Week 1, Rivers helped lead the Chargers to an overtime victory over the Colts. He, along with Austin Ekeler, helped lead them to the game-winning touchdown drive. In a low-scoring duel with the Lions in Week 2, Rivers had a chance to lead the Chargers on a game-winning touchdown drive but threw a late interception near the redzone. In Week 3, down 7 late in the fourth quarter, Rivers drove deep into Texans' territory with five pass completions but was unable to reach the endzone in the loss. In Week 4, in a 30–10 victory over the Dolphins, Rivers, with a 131.9 passer rating, and the Chargers played their most complete game to that point of the season. Following the victory over Miami, the Chargers went on a three-game losing streak with all three games being lost by a touchdown or less. Following two victories over the Bears and Packers, the Chargers went on another three game losing streak with all losses being by a touchdown or less. The Chargers ended their losing streak with a 45–10 victory over the Jaguars. Rivers posted a 154.4 passer rating with three touchdown passes in the victory. The Chargers lost their last three games.

Rivers finished the 2019 season with 4,615 passing yards, 23 touchdowns, and 20 interceptions—which were the third most in the NFL. His 23 turnovers played a part in the Chargers' 2–9 record in contests decided by a touchdown or less, and the team ended with a 5–11 overall record. On February 10, 2020, the Chargers and Rivers mutually agreed that he would not be re-signed and would enter free agency.

=== Indianapolis Colts (first stint) ===
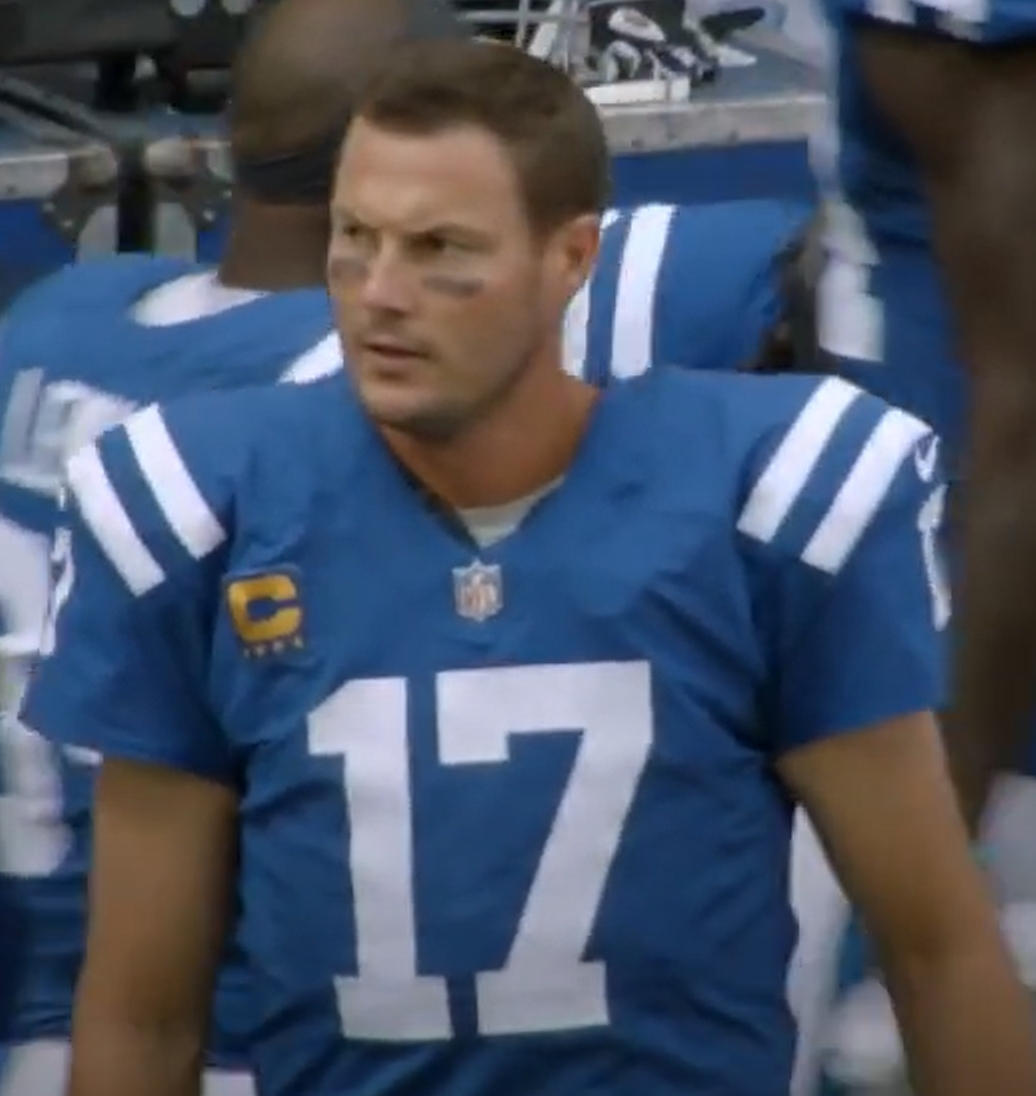
Rivers in 2020

On March 21, 2020, Rivers signed a one-year, $25 million deal with the Indianapolis Colts.

Rivers played his first game with the Colts on September 13, 2020, finishing with 363 passing yards, one touchdown, and two interceptions as the Colts lost 27–20 to the Jacksonville Jaguars. He earned his first victory with the Colts in a Week 2 28–11 victory over the Minnesota Vikings. He passed for 371 yards, three touchdowns, and one interception in the 31–27 victory over the Cincinnati Bengals in Week 6, which he led the Colts back from down 24–7.

In Week 10, against the Tennessee Titans, Rivers threw for 308 yards and a touchdown during the 34–17 win. During the game, Rivers passed Dan Marino to become fifth on the all-time passing yards list. During the game against the Green Bay Packers in Week 11, Rivers ruptured his plantar plate, which was later reported to require offseason surgery, though he would play through the remainder of the season with the injury. In Week 17 against the Jacksonville Jaguars, Rivers passed Dan Marino in passing touchdowns, putting him at fifth all time. He finished the 2020 season with 4,169 passing yards, 24 touchdowns, and 11 interceptions. Rivers recorded his 12th season with at least 4,000 passing yards, tying him with Tom Brady and Drew Brees at the time for second-most in NFL history.

During the Wild Card Round against the Buffalo Bills, Rivers threw for 309 yards and two touchdowns in the 27–24 road loss. It was the first time in Rivers's career that he lost in the Wild Card Round.

=== Initial retirement ===
On January 20, 2021, Rivers announced his retirement from the NFL after 17 seasons, saying: "It's just time. It's just right." Rivers reaffirmed his plans to become the head coach of the St. Michael Catholic High School football team in Fairhope, Alabama.

Four years later, on July 21, 2025, Rivers signed a one-day contract to retire as a member of the Chargers.

=== Indianapolis Colts (second stint) ===
According to Rivers, he received interest from multiple teams during his retirement. The closest he came to returning to the NFL occurred in 2023, after San Francisco 49ers starting quarterback Brock Purdy was injured during a loss in the NFC Championship Game. Head coach Kyle Shanahan later revealed that Rivers would have been signed to play in Super Bowl LVII had the 49ers advanced.

In the wake of a season-ending Achilles injury to quarterback Daniel Jones, Indianapolis signed Rivers to the team's practice squad on December 10, 2025. Three days later, the Colts activated Rivers from the practice squad. The NFL approved the Colts to reissue the #17 jersey number to Rivers, who wore that number his entire professional career, despite Jones wearing #17 as well for the first eleven games of the 2025 season. Due to his return to the NFL, Rivers's Pro Football Hall of Fame eligibility waiting period reset due to its five-year retirement rule in place; he was a semifinalist for 2026 prior to his return to football.

Rivers made his first start in nearly five years on December 14 against the Seattle Seahawks. Rivers finished the narrow 18–16 loss completing 18 of 27 passes for 120 yards, a touchdown, and an interception on the Colts' final drive of the game. Indianapolis used a conservative game plan, with only nine of Rivers's throws traveling more than five yards.

On December 22, Rivers made his first home start since his return on Monday Night Football against the San Francisco 49ers. He threw for 121 yards in the first quarter, which exceeded his entire game total from the previous week. He finished with 277 yards, two touchdowns, and a pick-six with 3:26 left in the game that secured the win for the 49ers, 48–27.

On December 28, in Week 17 and in what would turn out to be Rivers's final game, he threw for 147 passing yards in the home clash with the Jacksonville Jaguars, completing 17 of 30 pass attempts, which included a touchdown pass and an interception. The Colts eventually lost 23–17 to the Jaguars, which meant that they could not advance to the season's playoffs.

=== Second retirement ===
After the loss to the Jaguars, Rivers announced that, after the 2025 regular season, he would return to his coaching job, with Riley Leonard starting as the Colts' quarterback in the Week 18 game against the Houston Texans.

== Career statistics ==
Legend
	Led the league
**Bold**	Career high

=== NFL ===
==== Regular season ====
Year	Team	Games			Passing								Rushing				Sacks		Fumbles	
Year	Team	GP	GS	Record	Cmp	Att	Pct	Yds	Avg	TD	Int	Rtg	Att	Yds	Avg	TD	Sck	SckY	Fum	Lost
2004	SD	2	0	—	5	8	62.5	33	4.1	1	0	**110.9**	4	−5	−1.3	0	0	0	1	0
2005	SD	2	0	—	12	22	54.5	115	5.2	0	1	50.4	1	−1	−1.0	0	3	16	2	0
2006	SD	16	16	**14–2**	284	460	61.7	3,388	7.4	22	9	92.0	**48**	49	1.0	0	27	144	8	2
2007	SD	16	16	11–5	277	460	60.2	3,152	6.9	21	15	82.4	29	33	1.1	**1**	22	163	11	6
2008	SD	16	16	8–8	312	478	65.3	4,009	8.4	**34**	11	105.5	31	84	2.7	0	25	151	8	4
2009	SD	16	16	13–3	317	486	65.2	4,254	**8.8**	28	9	104.4	26	50	1.9	**1**	25	167	6	3
2010	SD	16	16	9–7	357	541	66.0	4,710	8.7	30	13	101.8	29	52	1.8	0	38	227	7	4
2011	SD	16	16	8–8	366	582	62.9	4,624	7.9	27	20	88.7	26	36	1.4	**1**	30	198	9	5
2012	SD	16	16	7–9	338	527	64.1	3,606	6.8	26	15	88.6	27	40	1.5	0	**49**	**311**	**15**	**7**
2013	SD	16	16	9–7	378	544	**69.5**	4,478	8.2	32	11	105.5	28	72	2.6	0	30	150	3	2
2014	SD	16	16	9–7	379	570	66.5	4,286	7.5	31	18	93.8	37	**102**	**2.8**	0	36	189	8	2
2015	SD	16	16	4–12	**437**	**661**	66.1	**4,792**	7.3	29	13	93.8	17	28	1.6	0	40	264	4	2
2016	SD	16	16	5–11	349	578	60.4	4,386	7.6	33	**21**	87.9	14	35	2.5	0	36	188	9	5
2017	LAC	16	16	9–7	360	575	62.6	4,515	7.9	28	10	96.0	18	−2	−0.1	0	18	120	8	1
2018	LAC	16	16	12–4	347	508	68.3	4,308	8.5	32	12	105.5	18	7	0.4	0	32	204	2	1
2019	LAC	16	16	5–11	390	591	66.0	4,615	7.8	23	20	88.5	12	29	2.4	0	34	222	8	3
2020	IND	16	16	11–5	369	543	68.0	4,169	7.7	24	11	97.0	18	−8	−0.4	0	19	118	2	1
2025	IND	3	3	0–3	58	92	63.0	544	5.9	4	3	80.2	2	−1	−0.5	0	5	37	2	0
Career		247	243	134–109	5,335	8,226	64.9	63,984	7.8	425	212	95.0	385	600	1.6	3	469	2,869	113	48

==== Postseason ====
Year	Team	Games			Passing								Rushing				Sacks		Fumbles	
Year	Team	GP	GS	Record	Cmp	Att	Pct	Yds	Avg	TD	Int	Rtg	Att	Yds	Avg	TD	Sck	SckY	Fum	Lost
2004	SD	0	0	DNP																
2006	SD	1	1	0–1	14	32	43.8	230	7.2	0	1	55.5	3	3	1.0	0	3	26	**1**	**1**
2007	SD	3	3	**2–1**	**52**	**86**	60.5	**767**	**8.9**	**4**	**4**	85.8	4	−2	−0.5	0	2	14	**1**	0
2008	SD	2	2	1–1	41	71	57.7	525	7.4	3	2	83.4	2	13	**6.5**	0	**8**	**60**	0	0
2009	SD	1	1	0–1	27	40	67.5	298	7.5	1	2	76.9	3	4	1.3	**1**	2	15	**1**	0
2013	SD	2	2	1–1	30	43	**69.8**	345	8.0	3	0	**116.9**	**5**	14	2.8	0	5	29	0	0
2018	LAC	2	2	1–1	47	83	56.6	491	5.9	3	1	80.9	3	**15**	5.0	0	3	21	0	0
2020	IND	1	1	0–1	27	46	58.7	309	6.7	2	0	93.5	1	−1	−1.0	0	0	0	0	0
Career		12	12	5–7	238	401	59.4	2,965	7.5	16	10	85.3	21	46	2.2	1	23	165	3	1

=== College ===
Legend
Led NCAA Division I FBS

Year	Team	Games (Note: Rivers's statistics from two of his four bowl game appearances are excluded, as bowl game statistics were not officially counted toward season or career totals prior to 2002.)			Passing								Rushing			
Year	Team	GP	GS	Record	Cmp	Att	Pct	Yds	Y/A	TD	Int	Rtg	Att	Yds	Avg	TD
2000	NC State	12	12	8–4	237	441	53.7	3,054	6.9	25	**10**	126.1	73	−87	−1.2	2
2001	NC State	12	12	7–5	240	368	65.2	2,586	7.0	16	7	134.8	44	−26	−0.6	2
2002	NC State	14	14	**11–3**	262	418	62.7	3,353	8.0	20	**10**	141.1	57	100	**1.8**	**10**
2003	NC State	13	13	8–5	**348**	**483**	**72.0**	**4,491**	**9.3**	**34**	7	**170.5**	**78**	**109**	1.4	3
Career		51	51	34–17	1,087	1,710	63.6	13,484	7.9	95	34	144.2	252	96	0.4	17

== Career highlights ==
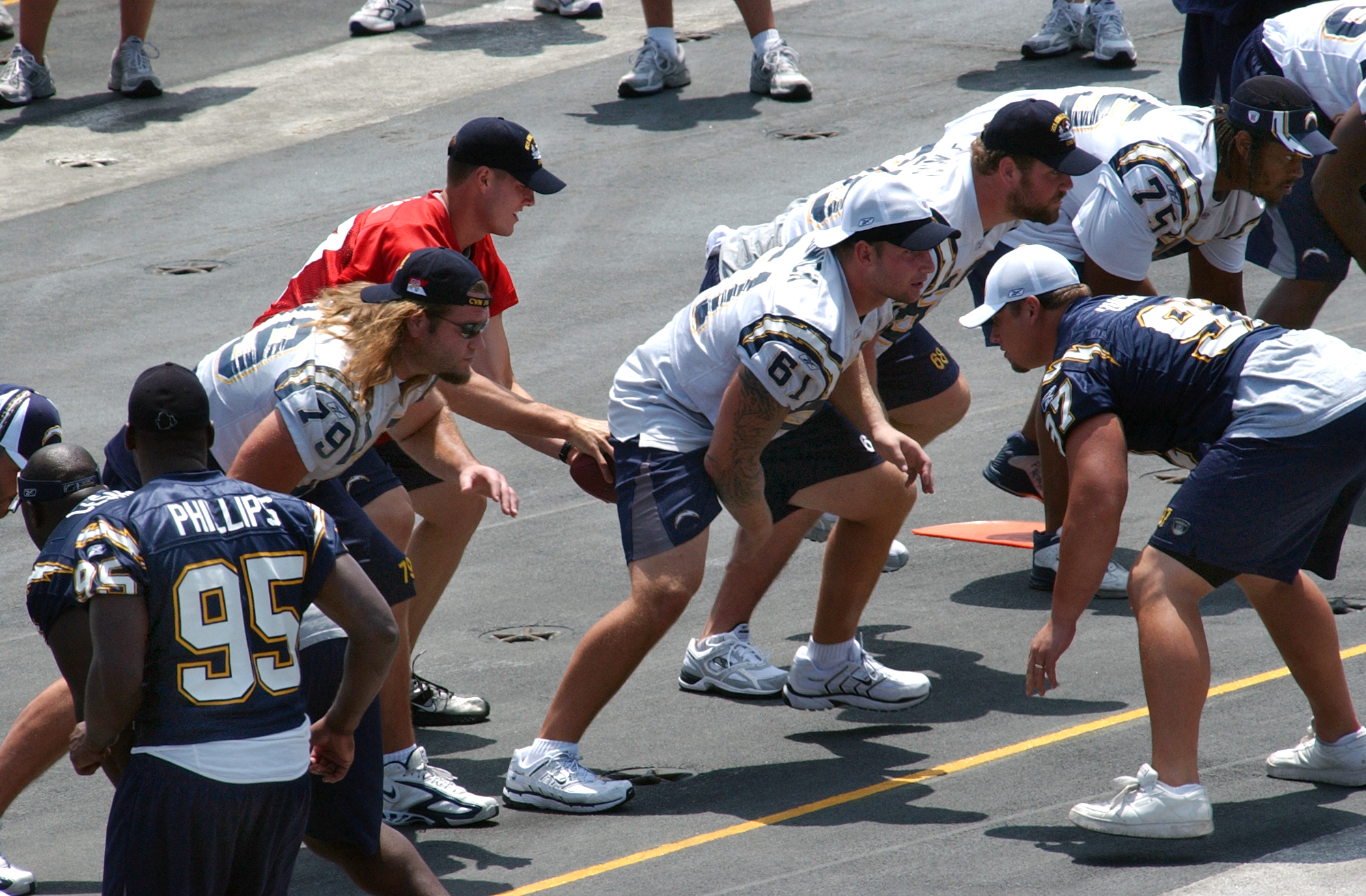
Rivers (in red jersey), with teammates on USS Ronald Reagan, in 2006

=== Awards and honors ===
NFL

- 8× Pro Bowl selection (2006, 2009, 2010, 2011, 2013, 2016, 2017, 2018)
- NFL Comeback Player of the Year (2013)
- NFL passing touchdowns co-leader (2008)
- NFL passing yards leader (2010)
- NFL passer rating leader (2008)
- NFL completion percentage leader (2013)
- PFWA NFL Comeback Player of the Year (2013)
- PFWA Good Guy Award (2021)
- San Diego Chargers 50th Anniversary Team
- 8× NFL Top 100 — 26th (2011), 61st (2012), 34th (2014), 43rd (2015), 46th (2016), 73rd (2017), 56th (2018), 17th (2019)
- 4× AFC Offensive Player of the Month (December 2008, December 2009, October 2010, September 2014)
- 10× AFC Offensive Player of the Week (Week 6, 2006; Week 5, 2007; Week 15, 2008; Week 2, 2013; Week 4, 2013; Week 16, 2014; Week 4, 2015; Week 12, 2017; Week 17, 2017; Week 12, 2018)

College

- NCAA passer rating leader (2003)
- NCAA completion percentage leader (2003)
- ACC Athlete of the Year (2004)
- ACC Player of the Year (2003)
- ACC Offensive Player of the Year (2003)
- ACC Rookie of the Year (2000)
- First-team All-ACC (2003)
- Second-team All-ACC (2002)
- NC State Wolfpack No. 17 retired

=== Records ===
==== NFL records ====
- Consecutive completions: 25 (November 25, 2018; tied with Ryan Tannehill and Nick Foles)
- Consecutive games with a passer rating above 120: 5

==== Chargers franchise records ====
Career

- Games played: 228
- Wins: 123
- Pass completions: 4,908
- Pass attempts: 7,591
- Passing yards: 59,271
- Passing touchdowns: 397

Season

- Completion percentage (16 starts): 69.5 (2013)
- Passer rating (16 starts): 105.5 (2008 and 2013)

Game

- Pass completions: 43 (October 18, 2015, against the Green Bay Packers)
- Pass attempts: 65 (October 18, 2015, against the Green Bay Packers)
- Completion percentage (min. 20 attempts): 96.8% (28/29 on November 25, 2018, against the Arizona Cardinals)
- Passing yards: 503 (October 18, 2015, against the Green Bay Packers)

Postseason

- Career passing yards: 2,656
- Career pass attempts: 355
- Career completions: 211
- Career completion percentage (min. 50 attempts): 59.4%
- Career quarterback rating (min. 50 attempts): 84.2
- Passing touchdowns, game: 3 (done 3 times) (tied with Dan Fouts)
- Completion percentage, game (min 15 attempts): 75% (12 for 16, January 5, 2014, in the Wild Card Round against the Cincinnati Bengals)
- QB rating, game (min 25 attempts): 115.8 (January 12, 2014, in the Divisional Round against the Denver Broncos)

== Coaching career ==
On August 26, 2021, Rivers won his first game as a high school football head coach, leading the St. Michael Catholic Cardinals to a 49–0 victory. Rivers was inspired to coach by his father, who was his high school football coach.

Following Rivers's second retirement from the NFL, he interviewed with the Buffalo Bills on January 23, 2026, for their vacant head coaching position, but withdrew from consideration days later.

On November 13, 2026, Rivers was named the head coach at NC State on a five-year contract.

== Head coaching record ==
=== High school ===
Year	Team	Overall	Conference	Standing	Bowl/playoffs
St. Michael Catholic Cardinals (AHSAA Class 4A – Region 1) (2021–present)
2021	St. Michael Catholic	8–3	4–3	3rd	
2022	St. Michael Catholic	5–5	4–3	5th	
2023	St. Michael Catholic	6–5	6–2	3rd	
2024	St. Michael Catholic	12–2	5–1	2nd	L – Jackson (28–49) Semi-Final Round
2025	St. Michael Catholic	13–1	6–0	1st	L – Jackson (23–44) Semi-Final Round
St. Michael Catholic:		44–16	25–9		

=== College ===
Year	Team	Overall	Conference	Standing	Bowl/playoffs
NC State Wolfpack (Atlantic Coast Conference) (2027–present)
2027	NC State	0–0	0–0		
NC State:		0–0	0–0		

== Personal life ==
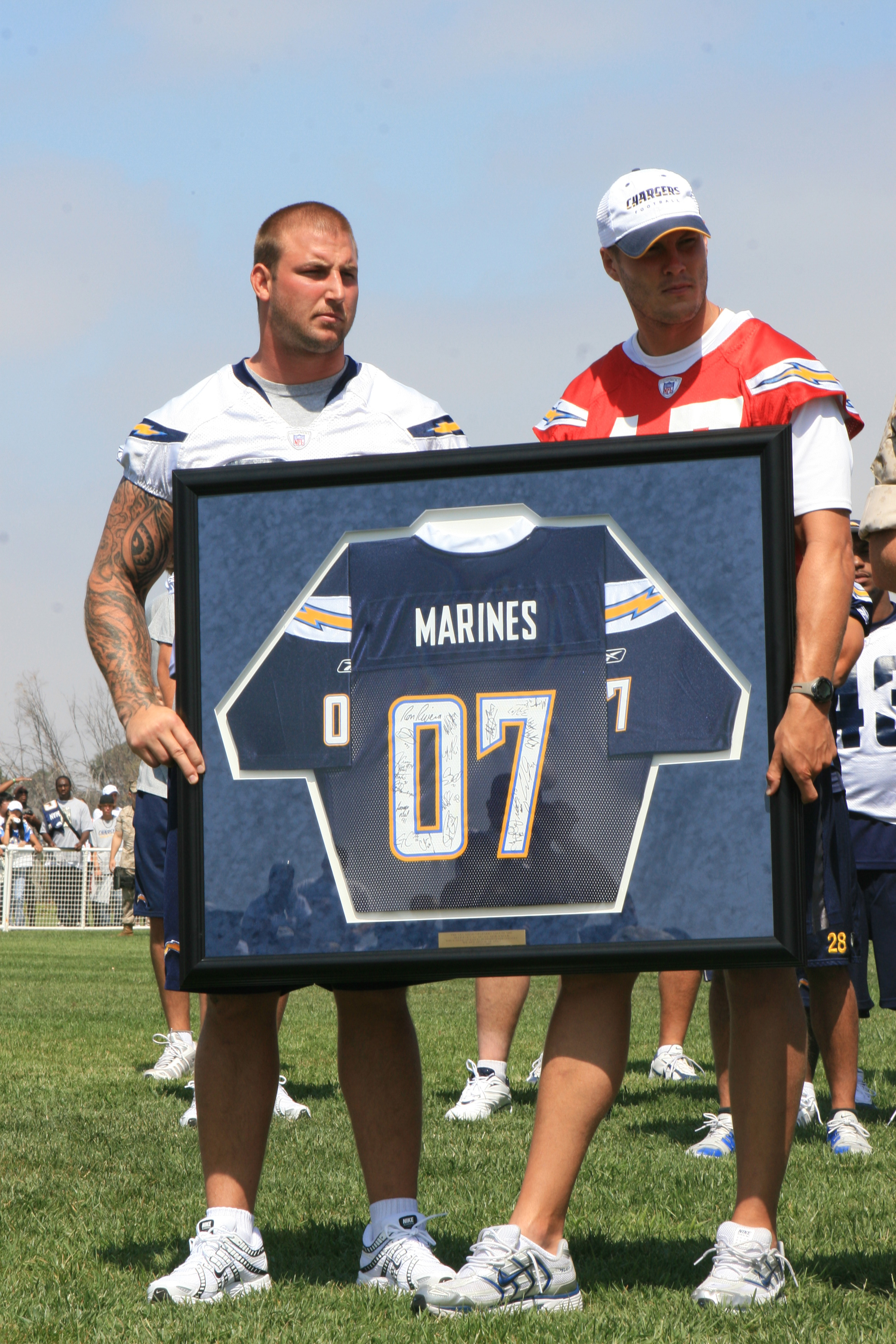
Rivers (right) in 2007

Rivers is a Catholic. His father was originally a Southern Baptist but converted to Catholicism when Rivers was a child. Rivers married his junior high school sweetheart, Tiffany, in 2001. She converted to Catholicism. They have seven daughters and three sons. Rivers became a grandfather in 2024. His oldest son, Gunner, became the starting quarterback in the 2023 season for St. Michael Catholic High School in Fairhope, Alabama, where Rivers served as coach, and would eventually become a ranked recruit; in 2026, he committed to play college football at NC State.

For his last three seasons with the Chargers, after they relocated from San Diego to Los Angeles, Rivers decided not to uproot his family to Los Angeles and instead purchased a customized SUV so he could study film during his commutes to and from San Diego.

Rivers is a social conservative; during the 2012 Republican Party presidential primaries, he endorsed former Pennsylvania senator Rick Santorum. Rivers is an advocate for chastity before marriage, and stated in 2012 that he supported Jason Evert of Catholic Answers.

In 2011, he was named one of three finalists for the Walter Payton NFL Man of the Year Award for his work with the Rivers of Hope Foundation, an endeavor he and his wife oversaw from 2010 to 2012 to help foster children. The foundation raised more than $1 million for the cause through football camps, a 5K Fun Run and personal contributions from Rivers. The foundation supported the San Pasqual Academy, a residential education campus designed specifically for foster teens.

Rivers comes from an athletic family. His father Steve and his younger brother Stephen both played college football. Steve played linebacker at Mississippi State University in the 1970s. Stephen committed to play college football at Louisiana State University after attending Austin High School and Athens High School. On June 5, 2014, he transferred to Vanderbilt University and was eligible to play immediately, but wound up transferring to Northwestern State University for the 2015 season.

Rivers received an honorary degree, doctor of humane letters, and addressed the class of 2014 at the 125th annual commencement ceremony of the Catholic University of America (CUA) on May 17, 2014. The same year, Rivers was part of a campaign to benefit the Ronald McDonald House Charities of San Diego.

== See also ==
- List of 500-yard passing games in the National Football League
- List of most consecutive starts and games played by National Football League players
- List of National Football League career passer rating leaders
- List of National Football League career quarterback wins leaders
- List of National Football League quarterback playoff records
- NCAA Division I FBS passing leaders
- List of NCAA major college football yearly passing leaders
- List of North Carolina State University people
