= Decatur High School (Alabama) =

Location
- 910 Somerville Road SE; Decatur, Alabama 35601; United States; 34°35′35″N 86°58′16″W

Information
- School type: Public
- Motto: Pride, Tradition, Excellence.
- Established: 1950 (76 years ago)
- School district: Decatur City Schools
- CEEB code: 010860
- Principal: Jeremy Mitchell
- Teaching staff: 68.50 (FTE)
- Grades: 9-12
- Enrollment: 1,026 (2023-2024)
- Student to teacher ratio: 14.98
- Colors: Red and black
- Nickname: Red Raiders
- Website: dhs.dcs.edu

Decatur High School is a public high school in Decatur, Alabama, United States. It is one of two high schools in the Decatur City School District. Decatur High offers technical, academic, and Advanced Placement (AP) programs, as well as dual enrollment with the John C. Calhoun Community College System.

Decatur High, along with southwestern Decatur's Austin High School, were the first International Baccalaureate schools in Alabama north of Birmingham. Starting in the 2017-2018 school year, Decatur High will no longer continue the IB program.

In 2018, the Decatur City Schools, in a massive realignment of school districting, opened a new DHS campus across Somerville Road Southeast from its location of several decades on Prospect Drive. The new Decatur High was built on the site of the former Somerville Road Elementary School, whose students were eventually moved to the old Oak Park Middle School (subsequently renamed Oak Park Elementary). Students who formerly attended Oak Park Middle were moved into the old DHS campus, which was renovated and renamed Decatur Middle. A similar process occurred with schools on Decatur's western side at the same time.

== Athletics ==
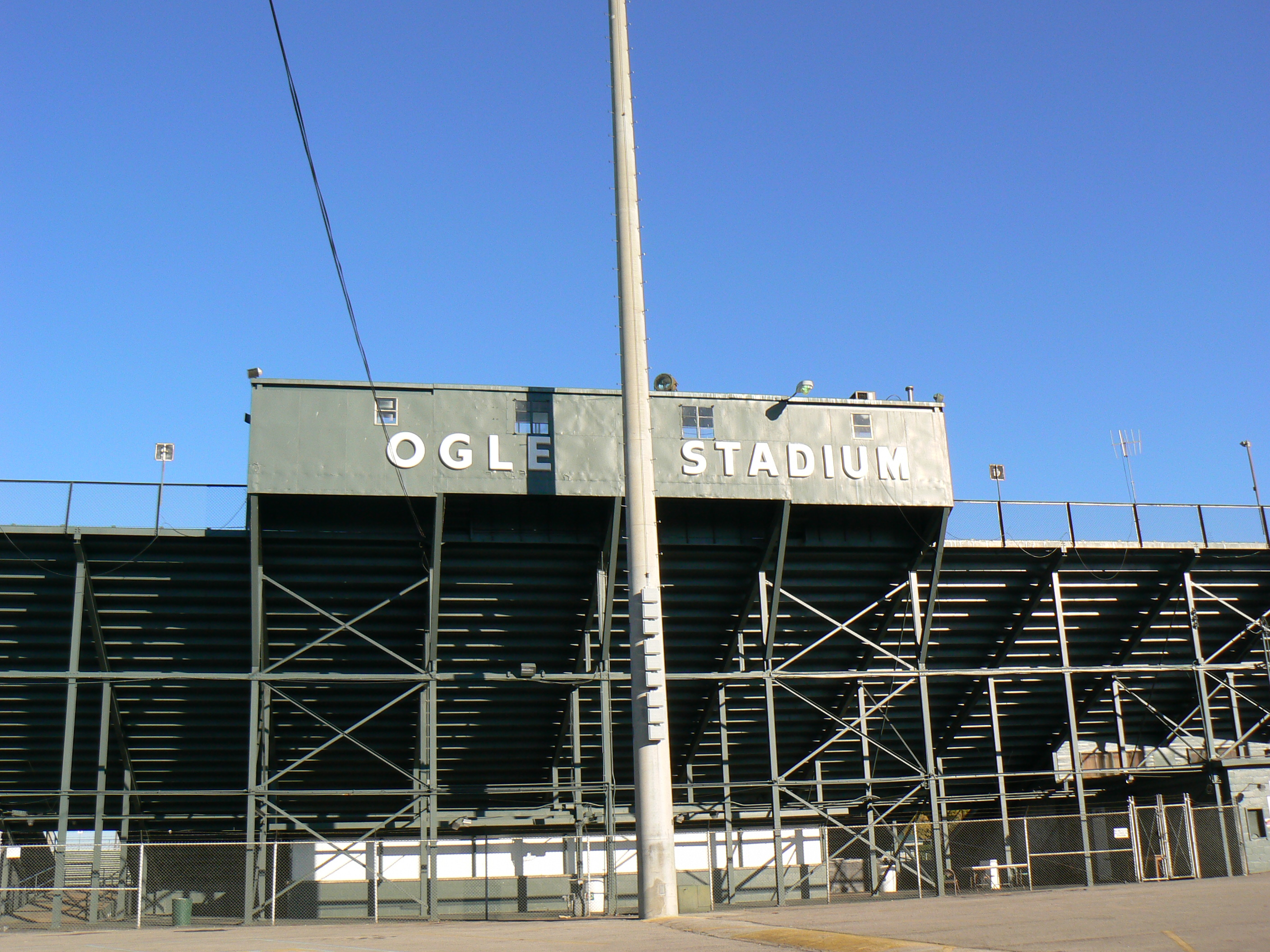
Ogle Stadium

Decatur High's football and soccer programs play at the 9,000-seat Ogle Stadium at the southern end of the former Decatur High campus, also located near Decatur Morgan Hospital. The stadium, owned by the school system, is named for Alabama Sports Hall of Famer and former Decatur High coach H. L. "Shorty" Ogle, who led the Red Raiders from 1933 to 1963. The high school's sports teams often use the field for practice.

Prior to 1949, the Decatur football team played at the 3,000-person capacity Benson Field, now a part of Rhodes Ferry Park along the shores of the Tennessee River, located next to the now-closed Riverview High School, Decatur High's predecessor.

Prior to 2018, when Austin High School relocated and got a stadium of its own (at the same time of Decatur High's physical relocation across Somerville Road), both of the high schools in Decatur played their home games in the stadium, with their schedules arranged accordingly; occasionally, that meant that one of the teams had to play a home game on a Thursday night, instead of Friday as is customary in Alabama high school athletics. The one exception was the Decatur-Austin game. In that case, one team occupied the away side while the other manned the home side. The schools alternated hosting each year, despite the game occurring on Decatur High property, akin to the practice of Alabama and Auburn college football in the years when the "Iron Bowl" was held at Legion Field in Birmingham. This football game usually sold out the stadium, and brought in crowds of over 10,000, in a city of perhaps 40,000 to 50,000 population, to watch the intra-city rivalry.

=== Football ===
Decatur High has produced many players that went on to play at the collegiate and professional levels, including Jerraud Powers and Rolando McClain.

Other long-tenured Red Raider coaches, other than Ogle, are Earl Webb and Steve Rivers, father of famed NFL quarterback Philip Rivers. However, the younger Rivers played his high school ball at Athens High School in nearby Athens, Alabama, where his father was coaching at the time. As of 2021, Jere Adcock, Steve Rivers' successor, is the current head coach at DHS.

The Decatur High School Football Team won the 1971 State 4A Football Championship under the leadership of Coach Earl Webb and coaches Wally Burnham, Paul Glover and Jimmy Holley. (Alabama High School Football Historical Society)

=== Basketball ===
Decatur High School has won one boys' state championship under coach Earl Morris and five girls' state championships under coach Mike Smith. The 1948 basketball team was the first Decatur High team to go to the state tournament; however, it did not win the county tournament.

=== Soccer ===
The Decatur High School girls' soccer team defeated Briarwood Christian of Birmingham in the class 5A Alabama State Championship game on May 10, 2008.

== Visual arts ==
Decatur High School's Visual Arts department offers a wide range of art courses that include Drawing and Painting (Art I – IB/AP Studio Art), Ceramics, Graphic Design, and Photography. A scaffolded curriculum is in place to prepare students for portfolio coursework in IB (International Baccalaureate) Visual Art or AP Studio Art classes. In addition to ongoing competition exhibitions, student work is exhibited throughout the year at Decatur Morgan Hospital, in the fall at the All City Music and Art Festival, and at Decatur High during its spring art exhibit. Students in the IB and AP Art courses have scored above the world average for the past two years.

Students who excel in the visual arts at Decatur High School and who exhibit exemplary character and meet academic requirements are invited to join the National Art Honor Society (NAHS). NAHS was created by the National Art Education Association for the purpose of inspiring and recognizing those students who have shown an outstanding ability in art. NAHS members at Decatur High School complete art-related service hours for the Carnegie Visual Arts Center and to create ceramic bowls to raise money for North Alabama food pantries. Decatur High School students participate annually in various city, state, and national competitions. In 2011−12 students placed 1st, 2nd, and 3rd place in the citywide PTA Reflections competition. A DHS senior was awarded a regional Gold Key in the prestigious Scholastic Art and Writing Award competition, a regional Blue Ribbon in the district 5 VAA competition, and also earned one of three portfolio scholarships in the Alabama State Council on the Arts Visual Arts Achievement Program that are annually adjudicated by college professionals from the Southeast according to AP College Board guidelines.

The Decatur High School art department actively promotes the success of its students through participation in state and nationally-recognized competitions and assists students in applications for portfolio and academic merit scholarships. During the 2011–12 school year, students received over $140,000 in visual art scholarships.

== Band ==
The Decatur High School's Chorus and Concert Bands have consistently received superior ratings in both district and state festivals.

Decatur High has the longest string of District Festival Superior Ratings in Alabama, dating back to the festival's formation in 1947, never receiving anything less than a superior rating.

Decatur High also continues to lead in total number of Alabama Bandmasters State Festival Superior Ratings at 58, more than any other high school in state history.

The Decatur Red Raider Marching Band won the Tennessee Valley Invitational at Muscle Shoals High School in Muscle Shoals, Alabama in 2006. Since then, the band has won its class twice at the Vanderbilt Marching Invitational. During its undefeated 2010 season, the Red Raider Marching Band became the first ever band from the state of Alabama to win a class at the prestigious Contest of Champions in Murfreesboro, Tennessee. The Contest of Champions is the oldest marching contest in America, with 49 straight years of competition. In 2013, the band once again won the Tennessee Valley Invitational.

== Notable alumni ==
- Paul T. Entrekin, aviator
- Alan Koch, Major League Baseball player
- Benny Perrin, NFL player
- Mario Morris, former Alabama Crimson Tide linebacker, Notre Dame Executive athletic director, NCAA chief financial officer
- Yolanda Watkins Smith All American college basketball
- Rolando McClain, NFL linebacker for the Dallas Cowboys
- Jerraud Powers, cornerback for the Arizona Cardinals
- Don Whitmire, member of the College Football Hall of Fame

== See also ==
- Decatur City Schools
- Decatur, Alabama
