= AJH =

AJH may refer to:

- Aeroaljarafe (ICAO airline code AJH); see List of airline codes (A)
- Ajhai railway station (station code AJH) in Mathura, Uttar Pradesh, India
- AJH Films, a British film studio founded by Alex Holder
- American Journal of Hypertension

== See also ==
- AJHS (disambiguation)
