= Earl Morris =

Earl or Earle Morris may refer to:

- Earl Morris (basketball coach) (born 1933), American high-school basketball coach
- Earl H. Morris, American archeologist
- Earle Morris (curler) (born 1945), Canadian curler and coach
- Earle Morris Jr. (1928–2011), American politician
