= Jerraud Powers =

American football player (born 1987)

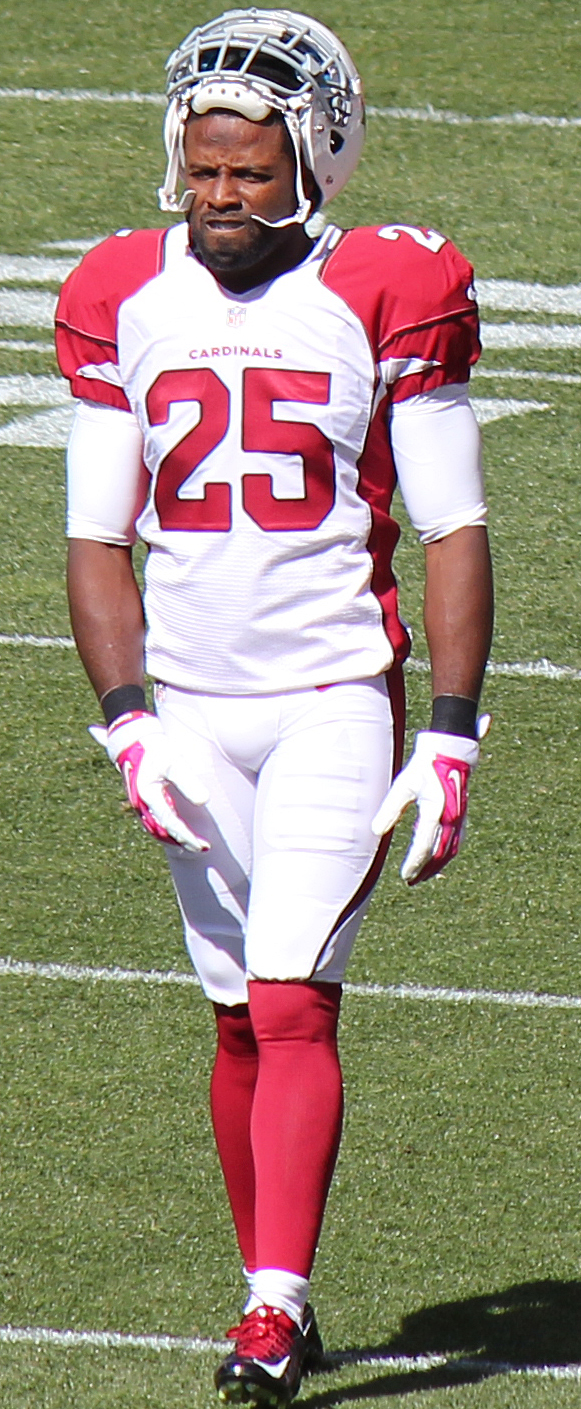
- Powers with the Arizona Cardinals in 2014

No. 25, 26
- Position: Cornerback

Personal information
- Born: July 19, 1987 (age 39); Decatur, Alabama, U.S.
- Listed height: 5 ft 10 in (1.78 m)
- Listed weight: 187 lb (85 kg)

Career information
- High school: Decatur
- College: Auburn
- NFL draft: 2009: 3rd round, 92nd overall pick

Career history
- Indianapolis Colts (2009–2012); Arizona Cardinals (2013–2015); Baltimore Ravens (2016)

Awards and highlights
- Freshman All-SEC (2006)

Career NFL statistics
- Total tackles: 413
- Sacks: 3.0
- Forced fumbles: 3
- Pass deflections: 74
- Interceptions: 13
- Defensive touchdowns: 2
- Stats at Pro Football Reference

Jerraud Powers (born July 19, 1987) is an American former professional football player who was a cornerback in the National Football League (NFL). He played college football for the Auburn Tigers and was selected by the Indianapolis Colts in the third round of the 2009 NFL draft. He also played for the Arizona Cardinals and Baltimore Ravens.

== Early life ==
Powers attended Decatur High School and was an all-state player He was named All-Region his senior year and was rated as a 3-Star prospect and the #13 player in the state of Alabama by scout.com. Rivals.com rated Powers the #8 player in Alabama following his senior season.

== College career ==
=== 2006 season ===
Powers broke his foot during preseason workouts and it appeared at the time that he would have only a small chance to get on the field, but he was able to play. Powers earned playing time on special teams as a freshman. Powers recovered a critical onside kick in Auburn's 24-17 win over South Carolina. Powers also made a name for himself by blocking Eric Wilbur's third quarter punt in a home game against the eventual national champion Florida Gators. As a sophomore, Powers earned a starting spot at cornerback and played the entire season. He was selected to the Southeastern Conference All-Freshman Team on a pass defense that rated second in the SEC this season.

=== 2007 season ===
Powers had a very successful 2007 season and received the Zeke Smith Award, presented each year to Auburn's Defensive Player of the Year. Jerraud Powers is also remembered as the cornerback covering LSU receiver Demetrius Byrd on his one-handed touchdown grab with one second remaining in the 2007 Auburn-LSU game. Powers also received a lot of attention from ESPN when an Auburn police dog bit his hand after a play in the 2007 Iron Bowl. The incident prompted a review of security procedures at Auburn.

=== 2008 season ===
Powers returned for his junior season with high expectations after an impressive sophomore season. His matchup against Florida's wing right Percy Harvin was considered a key to the big game. Powers was impressive early in the season, leading Auburn to a shutout in the season opener. However, Powers played with an injured hamstring and struggled through much of the season. Powers was just one of many injured players on Auburn's 2008 football team, Auburn finished with a disappointing 5-7 record and missed the postseason for the first time this decade. After the season, Powers decided to forgo his senior season at Auburn and enter the 2009 NFL draft.

== Professional career ==
=== Pre-draft ===
Powers was projected to be a possible NFL draft pick. Powers was rated 14 out of 239 cornerbacks and 110 out of 2,497 total players evaluated.

=== Indianapolis Colts ===
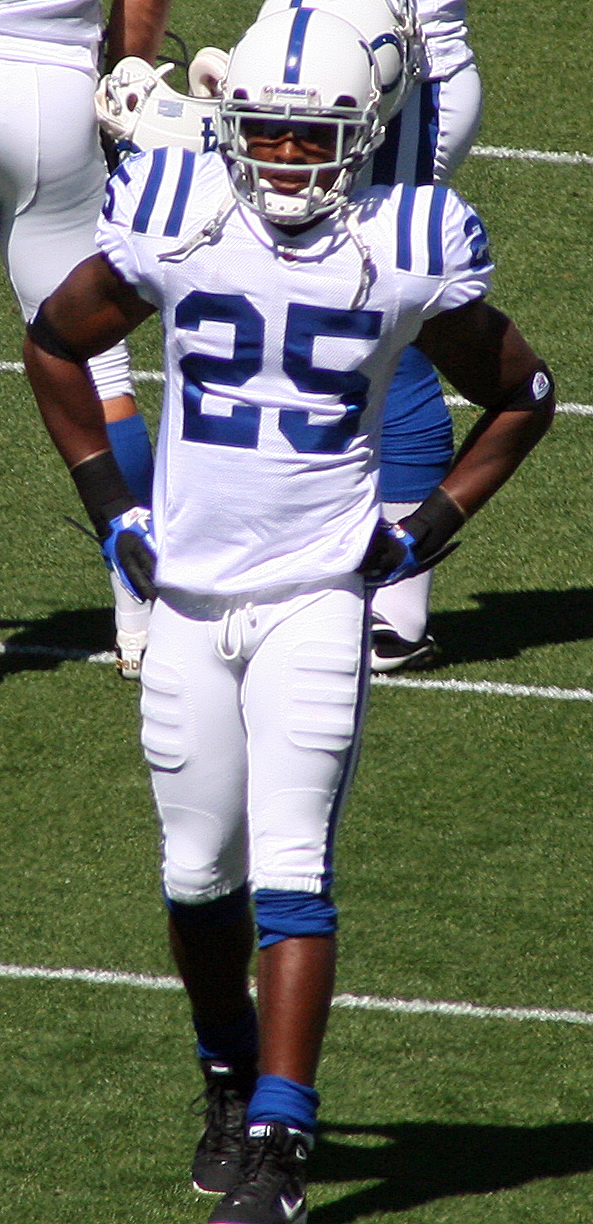
Powers in 2010 while with the Indianapolis Colts

Despite being considered a prospect for a lower round, Jerraud was selected by the Indianapolis Colts in the third round. He signed with the Colts on July 28, 2009, for a 4-year contract.

Powers began the 2009 season as a starter due to injuries to Marlin Jackson, and went on to start 12 of 16 games for the Colts. Despite injuries to three of the Colts' projected Defensive Backfield starters, Powers (along with fellow rookie Jacob Lacey) played well enough to put the Colts' pass defense at third in the league in Yards/Attempt. Powers recorded 66 tackles and an interception. On December 7, 2010, he was placed on season-ending injury reserve due to an arm injury.

In 2010, Powers played in 10 games, starting all of them. Powers had 53 tackles and 2 interceptions. On November 6, 2011, Powers had a pick six against Matt Ryan of the Atlanta Falcons. This was his first career touchdown. The Colts lost the game 31-7.

=== Arizona Cardinals ===
On March 13, 2013, the Arizona Cardinals signed Powers to a three-year contract, reuniting him with head coach Bruce Arians who was his interim head coach the previous year with the Indianapolis Colts.

=== Baltimore Ravens ===
On May 13, 2016, Powers signed with the Ravens on a one-year, $1.75 million contract.

=== Retirement ===
On April 14, 2017, Powers announced his retirement from the NFL after eight seasons.

== NFL career statistics ==
Legend
**Bold**	Career high

=== Regular season ===
Year	Team	Games		Tackles					Interceptions					Fumbles			
Year	Team	GP	GS	Cmb	Solo	Ast	Sck	TFL	Int	Yds	TD	Lng	PD	FF	FR	Yds	TD
2009	IND	12	12	**66**	57	9	0.0	1	1	1	0	1	10	**1**	1	4	0
2010	IND	10	10	53	42	11	0.0	**5**	2	11	0	11	9	0	0	0	0
2011	IND	12	12	51	33	**18**	0.0	4	2	**19**	**1**	**13**	6	0	0	0	0
2012	IND	8	8	40	33	7	0.0	2	1	0	0	0	8	0	0	0	0
2013	ARI	**16**	**16**	65	**60**	5	0.0	0	1	9	0	9	**17**	**1**	0	0	0
2014	ARI	**16**	11	53	48	5	**1.0**	3	**3**	**19**	0	12	10	**1**	0	0	0
2015	ARI	13	13	52	46	6	**1.0**	2	1	0	0	0	9	0	**2**	**12**	**1**
2016	BAL	13	6	33	26	7	**1.0**	2	2	1	0	1	5	0	0	0	0
		100	88	413	345	68	3.0	19	13	60	1	13	74	3	3	16	1

=== Playoffs ===
Year	Team	Games		Tackles					Interceptions					Fumbles			
Year	Team	GP	GS	Cmb	Solo	Ast	Sck	TFL	Int	Yds	TD	Lng	PD	FF	FR	Yds	TD
2009	IND	**2**	1	5	4	1	0.0	0	**1**	0	0	0	1	0	0	0	0
2014	ARI	1	0	1	1	0	0.0	0	0	0	0	0	0	0	0	0	0
2015	ARI	**2**	**2**	**8**	**6**	**2**	0.0	**1**	0	0	0	0	**2**	0	0	0	0
		5	3	14	11	3	0.0	1	1	0	0	0	3	0	0	0	0
