= Journal of the American Society of Hypertension =

- Discipline: Hypertension
- Language: English
- Edited by: Daniel Levy

Publication details
- History: 2007-2018
- Publisher: Elsevier
- Frequency: Monthly
- Impact factor: 2.615 (2017)

Standard abbreviations
- ISO 4: J. Am. Soc. Hypertens.

Indexing
- ISSN: 1933-1711 (print); 1878-7436 (web)

Links
- Journal homepage; Online access; Online archive

The Journal of the American Society of Hypertension was a monthly peer-reviewed medical journal covering hypertension. It was established in 2007 and was published until 2018 by Elsevier on behalf of the American Society of Hypertension, of which it was the official journal. The editor-in-chief was Daniel Levy (National Heart, Lung, and Blood Institute). According to the Journal Citation Reports, the journal had a 2017 impact factor of 2.615.
