= Decatur City Schools =

School district in Alabama

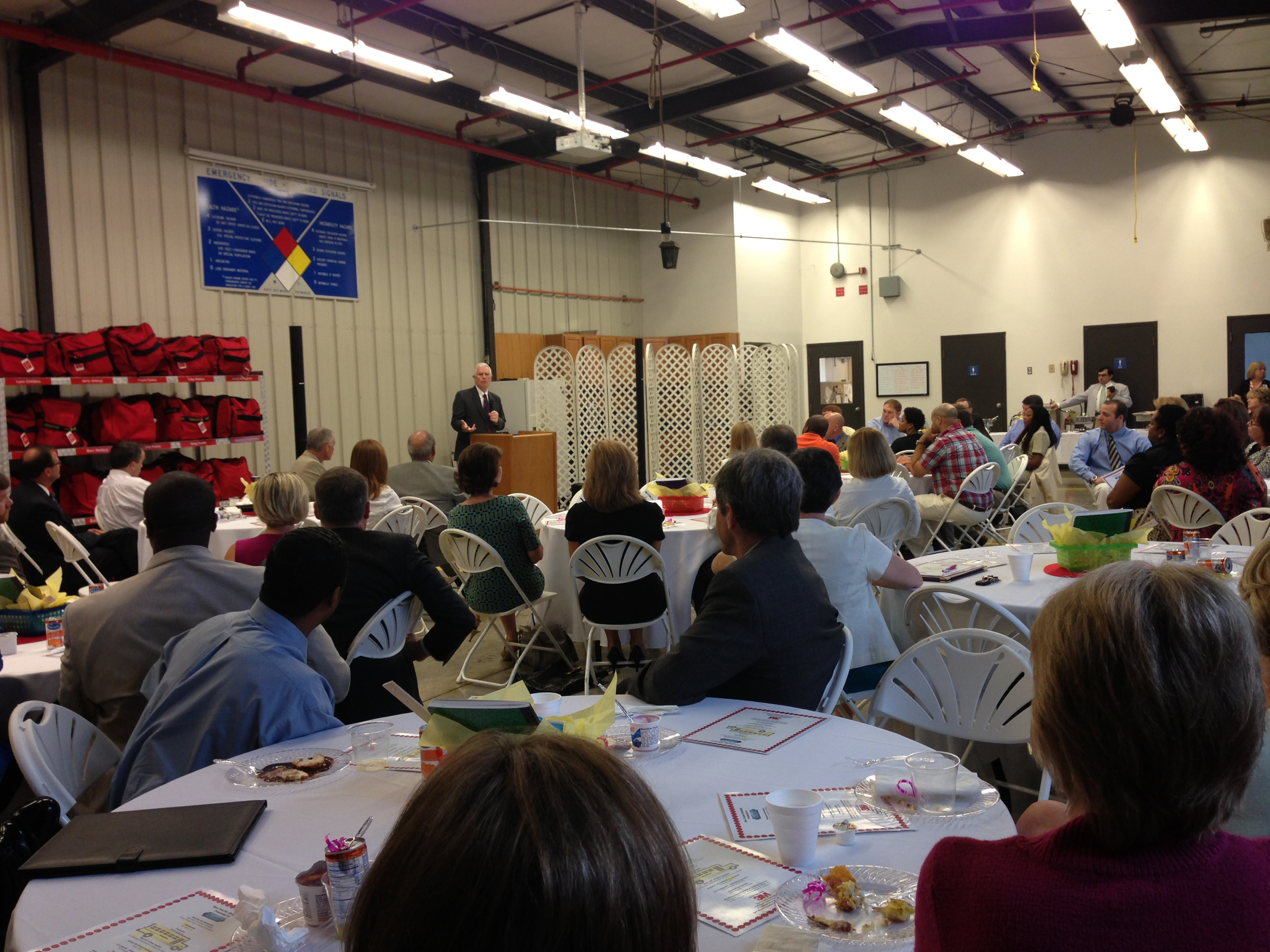
- Decatur City Schools New Teacher Breakfast

Location
- Decatur, Alabama United States

Other information
- Website: Official website

The Decatur City Schools is a school system located in the city of Decatur, Alabama, and is home to seven of Alabama's International Baccalaureate schools. The school system is also the second largest employer in Decatur.

== Overview ==
Decatur's spending per student is one of the highest in the state, and higher than many places in the nation.

The Decatur City School District was the first in North Alabama to offer the International Baccalaureate Programme. The system contains two IB Diploma Programme schools in the high schools, and two IB Primary Years Programme schools in the two magnet schools and three IB Middle Years Programme schools in the three middle schools. The Primary Years accredited schools are the first, and currently only, in Alabama. The Middle Years accredited schools are also the first and currently only in Alabama.

== Assets and achievements ==
- Decatur City Schools was the first school system in Alabama to join a partnership with the Kennedy Center for the Performing Arts in Washington, D.C.
- High school bands have a longstanding history of superior ratings:
  - Decatur High School leads the state of Alabama with the most Superior Ratings at State Competition, with 57 superiors, since the competition's formation in 1946.
  - Decatur High School also has never received less than a Superior Rating at any District Competition since its formation.
  - Austin High School has the longest string of Superior Ratings at State Competition.
- The school system contained more International Baccalaureate Accredited schools than any other system in the State of Alabama.
  - It was the only system with two IB Diploma high schools.
  - It is the only system in the state that houses any elementary schools that have received IB Primary Years accreditation.
  - It was the only system in the state that houses any elementary schools that have received IB Middle Years accreditation.

== Schools ==
=== Elementary schools ===
- Banks-Caddell
- Benjamin Davis (magnet grades 1–2)
- Chestnut Grove
- Eastwood
- Frances Nungester
- Julian Harris
- Leon Sheffield Elementary School (magnet grades 3–5)
- Walter Jackson
- West Decatur
- Woodmeade
- Austinville
- Oak Park

=== Middle schools ===
- Austin Middle School (6-7), formerly Cedar Ridge Middle School
- Decatur Middle School (6-8)
- Austin Junior High School (8-9)

=== High schools ===
- Austin High School - Mascot: Black Bears
- Decatur High School - Mascot: Red Raiders

=== IB accredited schools ===
- Austin High School - Diploma Program
- Decatur High School - Diploma Program
- Austin Middle School - Middle Years
- Benjamin Davis Elementary School - Primary Years
- Leon Sheffield Elementary School - Primary Years

== See also ==
- Decatur, Alabama

== Sources ==
- Official website
