= Benny Perrin =

American football player (1959–2017)

No. 23
- Position: Safety

Personal information
- Born: October 20, 1959; Orange County, California, U.S.
- Died: February 3, 2017 (aged 57); Decatur, Alabama, U.S.
- Listed height: 6 ft 2 in (1.88 m)
- Listed weight: 178 lb (81 kg)

Career information
- High school: Decatur (AL)
- College: Alabama
- NFL draft: 1982: 3rd round, 65th overall pick

Career history
- St. Louis Cardinals (1982–1985)

Awards and highlights
- PFWA All-Rookie Team (1982); National champion (1979)

Career NFL statistics
- Interceptions: 9
- Sacks: 1
- Fumble recoveries: 5
- Stats at Pro Football Reference

Jesse Bennett Perrin (October 20, 1959 – February 3, 2017) was an American professional football player who was a safety for four seasons with the St. Louis Cardinals of the National Football League (NFL). Perrin played for the legendary University of Alabama football coach Paul "Bear" Bryant from 1978 to 1981, winning NCAA National Championships in 1978 and 1979.

Perrin attended Decatur High School in Decatur, Alabama, where he resided at the time of his death and was the owner of BB Perrins Sports Bar and Grille.

Perrin committed suicide at the age of 57 on February 3, 2017.
