= Shelia Nash-Stevenson =

NASA engineer

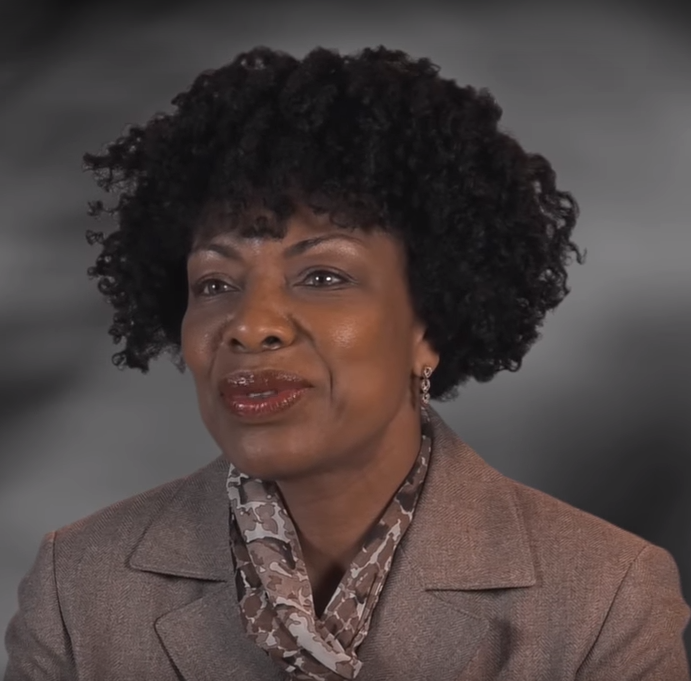
- Education: Alabama A&M University
- Scientific career
- Workplaces: Marshall Space Flight Center; Hughes Aircraft Company

Shelia Nash-Stevenson is an American physicist and engineer. Nash-Stevenson was the first Black woman in Alabama to earn a PhD in physics.

== Early life and education ==
Nash-Stevenson was born and raised in Lawrence County, Alabama. She graduated from Austin High School at the age of sixteen. She studied science and electronic and electrical engineering at Alabama A&M University in 1981. She was the first person to graduate from the Alabama A&M University physics masters program, where she was a NASA Fellow. She worked at Marshall Space Flight Center. Her professor, M. C. George, encouraged her to enter a PhD program. She was the first African-American woman to earn a doctorate in physics at the Alabama A&M University in 1994. During her postgraduate studies she had two children. She is three-times magna cum laude. At the time she was one of fewer than twenty African-American women with a physics PhD in the United States. She was a member of the Delta Sigma Theta sorority. She worked on photon avalanche upconversion.

== Career ==
Nash-Stevenson joined the United States Army Ballistic Missile Defense Systems Command. She holds a patent for an optical fiber holder. She joined Nichols Research Corporation as a scientist, then Hughes Aircraft Company as a technical researcher. She joined the instrumentation group in Marshall Space Flight Center's avionics lab, where she worked for nearly ten years. She was awarded a NASA Fellowship in 1998, and eventually joined the space craft and vehicle systems group. During her fellowship she returned to Alabama A&M University as a professor. She was at Kennedy Space Center to watch the STS-95 launch. She spoke at the 2013 Conference for Undergraduate Women in Physics.

In 2013 Huntsville, Alabama recognised her efforts for the community. She is the only African-American to serve on the Madison City School Board and she's a member of the Madison Rotary Club.

She won the Modern Figure award of NASA and was selected to attend the premiere of Hidden Figures. She took part in several panel discussions and interviews after the film was released. She gave the convocation talk at Elms College in 2017. In 2018 she was honoured by the WEDC Foundation Women Honoring Women program. She was featured in the AT&T Alabama African-American calendar.

== Personal life ==
In her personal life, Nash-Stevenson is a board member for the First Missionary Baptist Church and a charter member of the Madison Rotary Club in her hometown.
