= American Society of Hypertension =

The American Society of Hypertension (abbreviated ASH) was an American non-profit professional society dedicated to advancing research on hypertension and related cardiovascular diseases.

== History ==
The American Society of Hypertension, referred to as “ASH,” was a prominent nonprofit professional organization in the United States dedicated to advancing research and education on hypertension and related cardiovascular diseases. Its membership comprised domestic and international hypertension researchers (basic science and clinical investigators) and healthcare providers (physicians, physician assistants, nurse practitioners, pharmacists) committed to eliminating hypertension and its consequences. The society played a crucial role in promoting awareness and understanding of hypertension, a significant risk factor for cardiovascular diseases.

The ASH was founded in 1985 by 17 scientists and physiciansin order to provide a forum for the exchange of information among basic scientists, clinical investigators, and others involved in the study or management of high blood pressure. The Society focused on translating current research findings on hypertension into effective treatment strategies in order to better address the needs of hypertensive patients.

The Annual Scientific Meeting of the Society through varied educational formats provided registrants the opportunity to interact with fellow scientists and physicians from around the world to review and discuss issues relating to current scientific research and education related to hypertension linked to cardiovascular health. Meeting highlights include state-of-the- art lectures by renowned faculty, presentation of scientific studies and clinical trials, original oral and poster scientific abstract presentations, scientific sessions and workshops, debates, technical and scientific exhibits, and thought-provoking satellite symposia.

Between 1991 and 2008 the following Guidelines and Clinical Trials were presented at the Society’s Annual Scientific Meetings:

JNC4 1988, CLINICAL TRIAL: SHEP – 1991, CLINICAL TRIAL: SOLVD – 1991-92, JNC5 1992, JNC6 1997, CLINICAL TRIAL: DASH – 1997, CLINICAL TRIAL: HOT – 1998, CLINICAL TRIAL: UKPDS – 1998, CLINICAL TRIAL: LIFE – 2002, CLINICAL TRIAL: HOPE -2000, CLINICAL TRIAL: IRMA 2 – 2001, CLINICAL TRIAL: PROGRESS – 2001, CLINICAL TRIAL: RENAAL – 2001, CLINICAL TRIAL: AASK – 2002, JNC7 2003, CLINICAL TRAIL: ALLHAT – 2003, CLINICAL TRAIL: INVEST – 2003, CLINICAL TRIAL: CHARM – 2003, CLINICAL TRIAL: VALIANT – 2003, CLINICAL TRAIL: VALUE – 2004, CLINICAL TRAIL: ASCOT-BPLA – 2005, CLINICAL TRIAL: CAMELOT – 2004, CLINICAL TRAIL: TROPHY – 2006, CLINICAL TRAIL: ACCOMPLISH – 2008, CLINICAL TRAIL: HYVET– 2003, CLINICAL TRIAL: ONTARGET/TRANSCEND - 2008

Among other initiatives the Society provided Position Papers on Hypertension, created and sponsored a two (2)-day intensive course on Hypertension, set up a separate organization to test and certify physicians as hypertension specialists, developed criteria for the establishment and recognition of certified hypertension centers.

In 2005, the American Journal of Hypertension, a separate not for profit corporation, served as the official journal of the Society until the Journal cut ties with the Society over a dispute over control of content, conflict of interet, administrative management. In 2006, the Society became the center of a dispute over the appropriate role of pharmaceutical industry in medical research. The dispute prompted several members of an ASH group convened to write a new definition of high blood pressure to resign from the group; those resigning included former ASH president Michael H. Alderman.

In 2018, the Society dissolved and merged with the American Heart Association (AHA). Council on Hypertension. The Journal of the American Society of Hypertension, which was originally the official journal of the ASH, is now affiliated with the AHA.
