= Jacksonville High School =

Jacksonville High School is the name of several high schools in the United States:

- Jacksonville High School (Alabama)
- Jacksonville High School (Arkansas)
- Jacksonville High School (Illinois)
- Jacksonville High School (North Carolina)
- Jacksonville High School (Jacksonville, Texas)
