= Jamestown High School =

Jamestown High School is the name of several high schools in the United States.

- Jamestown High School (New York) of Jamestown, New York
- Jamestown High School (North Dakota) of Jamestown, North Dakota
- Jamestown High School (Virginia) of Williamsburg, Virginia
