= Paul T. Entrekin =

American aviator and aerobatic pilot

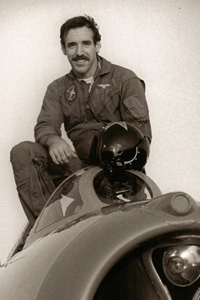
- Born: November 4, 1954 (age 71); Detroit, Michigan
- Occupations: Captain, Delta Air Lines, ret. Major, United States Marine Corps, ret.

Paul T. Entrekin (born November 4, 1954) is an American aviator and aerobatic pilot known primarily as an airshow performer in his Russian MiG-15 jet fighter.

== Biography ==
Entrekin was born in Detroit, Michigan, but considers Decatur, Alabama, to be his hometown. He graduated from Decatur High School, Decatur, Alabama in 1972 and went on to earn a Bachelor of Science degree in education from Auburn University in 1976.

== Military career ==
Entering active duty with the United States Marine Corps following graduation from Officer Candidate School in 1977, he completed The Basic School in Quantico, Virginia, and then received flight training at Pensacola, Florida, where he was designated a Naval Aviator in 1980.

He was assigned to the Marine Light Helicopter Squadron 267 (HML-267) “Stingers” and later the Marine Attack Helicopter Squadron 369 (HMA-369) “Gunfighters” at Camp Pendleton, California, which deployed to the Far East flying the UH-1N Huey both at sea and ashore. He is a graduate of multiple Marine Aviation and Weapons Tactics Squadron 1 (MAWTS-1) Instructor courses (WTI) at MCAS Yuma, Arizona, Forward Air Controller (Tactical Air Control Party) School, Landing Force Training Center, Pacific, at NAB Coronado, San Diego, California, and the Aviation Safety Officer Course at the United States Naval Postgraduate School in Monterey, California.

Selected as a Naval Aviation Training Command flight instructor, in 1984, he was assigned to the Navy Training Squadron 3 (VT-3) “Red Knights” where he was recognized as an Instructor of the Year flying the T-34C.
He also received the squadron's prestigious Order of the Red Max.

He later served as a reservist with the Defense Intelligence Agency retiring with the rank of major after Operations Desert Shield and Desert Storm in 1991. He is a member of the Order of Daedalians, the Marine Corps Aviation Association, the Association of Naval Aviation and the National Naval Aviation Museum Foundation.

== Civilian career ==
In 1986 he began Entrekin Aviation, initially with his Pitts S-2B and later with his MiG-15 as a full-time airshow performer that flew aerobatic flight demonstrations across North America entertaining millions of spectators.

Known as “The Bandit”, Entrekin was the first pilot in the world to own and fly a Russian MiG aircraft.

He also utilized the jet for motion picture and television productions; among them – Steal the Sky (HBO, 1988) and Lifestyles of the Rich and Famous (1987).
Entrekin is also one of the very few pilots rated to fly the world's smallest jet, the experimental BD-5J microjet. He flew classified government contract flights simulating the characteristics of cruise missile profiles.

He was the second jet representative of the International Council of Airshows (ICAS) Performer Safety Committee (later the ACE, Aerobatic Competency Evaluator, Committee) and held a level 1 (unlimited/ground level) aerobatic waiver.

In 1989 he accepted a position with Delta Air Lines. He has flown more than 18,000 hours in over 40 different types of aircraft including the Boeing 777.

He is author of two books, Mighty Hands and Mr. MiG

== Honors ==
- United States and World Record Holder (National Aeronautic Association & Federation Aéronautique Internationale) Speed Over A Recognized Course, Atlanta to Pensacola – 505.51 mph, MiG-15bis, 6 July 1993.
- United States and World Record Holder (National Aeronautic Association & Federation Aéronautique Internationale) Speed Over A Commercial Air Route, Atlanta to Greensboro – 486.60 mph, Boeing 727-200, 6 April 2003.
- Aviation and Space Exploration Wall of Honor
