= Earl Morris (basketball coach) =

Earl "The Pearl" Morris
Current position
- Team: (retired)

Biographical details
- Born: October 5, 1933 (age 92); Somerville, Alabama

Earl Morris (born October 5, 1933) is a retired Morgan County, Alabama, United States, High School basketball coach. His career spanned over 30 years.

== Coaching career ==
Morris's teams compiled a 590–250 record with three consecutive Alabama state championships 1957-1958-1959 at Austinville, and one at Decatur in 1970. His teams, known for their disciplined, fundamentally sound, team concept, won numerous county, district and region titles while averaging 20 wins per year. He received state, national, and international recognition for his coaching skills including admission into the ASHAA Hall of Fame in 1992 and the Decatur High School gymnasium named in recognition of him, making it the Earl Morris Gymnasium.

== Personal life ==
Earl Morris was born near Somerville, Alabama. He is a graduate of Union Hill School and Jacksonville State University, where he played basketball and started his coaching career. He currently resides with his wife, Olga, in Decatur, Alabama.
