= American Journal of Hypertension =

- Discipline: Cardiovascular medicine
- Language: English
- Edited by: Paul Muntner

Publication details
- Former name: Journal of Clinical Hypertension
- History: 1985-present
- Publisher: Oxford University Press (formerly Nature Publishing Group)
- Frequency: Monthly
- Impact factor: 3.2 (2023)

Standard abbreviations
- ISO 4: Am. J. Hypertens.

Indexing
- CODEN: AJHYE6
- ISSN: 0895-7061 (print); 1941-7225 (web)
- OCLC no.: 16748912

Links
- Journal homepage; Online access; Online archive

The American Journal of Hypertension is a monthly peer-reviewed medical journal covering the field of cardiovascular medicine. It is published by Oxford University Press and the editor-in-chief since Jan. 2026 is Paul Muntner (UAB). According to the Journal Citation Reports, the journal has a 2023 impact factor of 3.2.

== History ==
It was established in 1985 as the Journal of Clinical Hypertension, obtaining its current name in 1988. It was originally published quarterly by Elsevier, which transferred it to Nature Publishing Group beginning in 2008, but the journal is now published monthly by Oxford University Press, which acquired the journal in 2012. Oxford University Press' first issue of the journal was published in January 2013.

From its founding until 2005, the journal was the official journal of the American Society of Hypertension. In 2005, led by editor Michael Alderman, the journal split from the society to become and independent entity due to what the journal editors saw as an increasing involvement with industry on the part of the society. Since then, the society has started its own journal, the Journal of the American Society of Hypertension.

== Controversial salt research ==
In 2011, a meta-analysis published in the journal found no strong evidence that reducing salt consumption decreased all-cause mortality or cardiovascular morbidity. Its conclusions were at odds with those of previously conducted observational studies, which some researchers suggested was because the new meta-analysis did not look at enough patients.

In March 2014, another meta-analysis was published in the journal which found that reduced salt consumption and increased salt consumption, relative to the typical amount consumed by Americans, were associated with increased mortality. The study proved controversial because it found that the level of salt consumption associated with the best health outcomes was between 2,645 and 4,945 mg/day, which is much higher than the CDC's recommendations. The American Heart Association criticized the study, saying that it "relied on flawed data."
