= Jesuit High School =

Jesuit High School may refer to:

- Jesuit High School (Carmichael), California
- Jesuit High School (Tampa), Florida
- Jesuit High School (New Orleans), Louisiana
- Jesuit High School (Beaverton, Oregon)
- Jesuit College Preparatory School of Dallas, called Jesuit High School before 1969

== See also ==
- List of Jesuit secondary schools
