= Johnson High School =

Johnson High School can refer to:

== Canada ==
- F.W. Johnson Collegiate in Regina, Saskatchewan

== United States ==
Listed alphabetically by state

- Hiram W. Johnson High School (Sacramento, California)
- Johnson High School (Gainesville, Georgia)
- Johnson High School (Savannah, Georgia)
- Doris M. Johnson High School (Baltimore, Maryland)
- Governor Thomas Johnson High School (Frederick, Maryland)
- Johnson Senior High School (St. Paul, Minnesota)
- Arthur L. Johnson High School (Clark, New Jersey)
- Lady Bird Johnson High School (San Antonio, Texas)
- Lyndon B. Johnson High School (Austin, Texas)
- Lyndon B. Johnson High School (Laredo, Texas)
- Moe & Gene Johnson High School (Buda, Texas)
- Lyndon B. Johnson High School (Johnson City, Texas)
