= Jonesboro High School =

Jonesboro High School may refer to:

- Jonesboro High School (Arkansas) – Jonesboro, Arkansas
- Jonesboro High School (Georgia) – Jonesboro, Georgia
- Jonesboro Area Technical Center – Jonesboro, Arkansas
- Jonesboro-Hodge High School – Jonesboro, Louisiana
- Jonesboro School – Jonesboro, Texas
