= Mario Morris =

American college sports administrator

- Born: Decatur, Alabama, U.S.
- Education: University of Alabama (BS); University of Wisconsin–Madison (JD)
- Occupation: College sports administrator
- Employer: National Collegiate Athletic Association
- Title: Senior vice president of administration and chief financial officer

Mario Morris is an American business executive who serves as the senior vice president of administration and chief financial officer of the NCAA. He previously held athletics administration positions at the University of Wisconsin–Madison and the University of Notre Dame.

== Early life and education ==
Morris grew up in Decatur, Alabama. At Decatur High School, he played linebacker and was first-team all-state selection. Morris played linebacker at the University of Alabama and was a member of the undefeated 1992 Alabama Crimson Tide football team that won the national championship. He bypassed his senior year of football to concentrate on his education, graduating with a bachelor's degree in finance from Alabama and later earned a Juris Doctor from the University of Wisconsin–Madison.

== Career ==
Morris began his career in the financial services industry before moving into college athletics. He interned with the University of Wisconsin athletic department while in law school and later became its chief financial officer, with oversight of a budget of about $150 million. He joined the University of Notre Dame athletics department in 2019 as deputy athletics director for business operations, later becoming the executive deputy athletics director. In 2022, Morris was named the senior vice president of administration and chief financial officer for the NCAA.
