= Austin High School (Alabama) =

Public high school in Decatur, Alabama

Location
- 3004 Modaus Road Southwest; Decatur, Alabama 35603; United States; 34°33′50″N 87°02′56″W

Information
- School type: Public
- Motto: Once a black bear, always a black bear.
- Established: 1962 (64 years ago)
- School district: Decatur City Schools
- CEEB code: 010856
- Principal: DeMond Garth
- Teaching staff: 69.00 (FTE)
- Grades: 10-12
- Enrollment: 1,055 (2023-2024)
- Student to teacher ratio: 15.29
- Colors: Burnt orange and black
- Nickname: Black Bears
- Yearbook: Bruin
- Website: ahs.dcs.edu

Austin High School is located in Decatur, Alabama, United States. It is part of the Decatur City Schools system and enrolls over 1,400 students. Since its establishment in 1962, Austin has been one of two high schools in the Decatur area. It boasts a variety of programs.

AHS was erected in order to relieve overcrowding at Decatur High School, located in the southeastern part of town. Decatur underwent a massive growth in population in the 20 or so years after World War II due to the rapid development of manufacturing plants and jobs, along with support businesses, usually entailing, as elsewhere, young families. Originally, as was the custom of the time in Decatur and all of Alabama, Austin was a segregated school, for white youth only. When the city chose to shut down the historic all-black Lakeside School in response to Federal demands that Alabama desegregate its public schools in 1969, AHS received the preponderance of African-American youth from Lakeside. This was because of local residential patterns, enforced by municipal codes and local custom. Then, almost all of the city's black population resided west of the Louisville and Nashville Railroad, which then bisected Decatur's high school districts.

In 2018, the school system, in a massive realignment of school districting due to population shifts within the city away from the central parts of Decatur, opened a new AHS campus on Modaus Road several miles outside the Alabama Highway 67 bypass (locally known as the "Beltline"), replacing the original location on Danville Road Southwest. With that construction came the first new high school football stadium in the city in decades, meaning that Austin no longer has to share Ogle Stadium, located next to Decatur High School, with DHS, as had been the case since Austin's beginnings, since the city chose not to build a stadium with the original 1960s construction. The former Austin High campus was redesignated for use by younger pupils and is now named Austin Junior High School; AJHS replaced the closed Brookhaven Middle School, an institution that served a predominantly minority population and had been academically failing for years. At the same time, despite potential identity confusion, Cedar Ridge Middle School, built in the 1990s to address overcrowding then at the former Brookhaven Middle, was renamed by DCS as Austin Middle School. Cedar Ridge/Austin Middle is located close to the present Austin High, outside the Beltline and, along with AJHS, feeds students to the high school. A similar shuffling of facilities occurred on the city's eastern side at the same time, also due to construction of a new high school.

== Notable alumni ==
- Deonte Brown, NFL player for the Carolina Panthers and 2020 All-SEC football player for Alabama.
- Robin Henderson, Associate Director of the NASA Marshall Space Flight Center
- Ty Herndon, country music artist
- Javan Johnson, professional basketball player
- Shelia Nash-Stevenson, physicist and engineer
- Josh Pearson, former Jacksonville State player, Super Bowl champion (LV).
- Andy Price, comic book artist
- Juwan Simpson, former Canadian Football League player
- Reddy Steward, NFL cornerback for the Chicago Bears
