= Alabama Miss Basketball =

Each year the Alabama Miss Basketball award is given to the person chosen as the best high school girls basketball player in the U.S. state of Alabama. The award winner is selected by members of the Alabama Sports Writers Association.

== Award winners ==
Year	Player	High School	College	WNBA draft
2025	Ace Austin (2)	Spring Garden	Alabama	
2024	Ace Austin	Spring Garden	Alabama	
2023	Reniya Kelly	Hoover	North Carolina	
2022	Samiya Steele	Hazel Green	Alabama State/Jacksonville State	
2021	Karoline Striplin	Geneva County	Tennessee	
2020	Sarah Ashlee Barker	Spain Park	Georgia/Alabama	2025 WNBA draft: 1st Rnd, 9th overall by the Los Angeles Sparks
2019	Annie Hughes	Pisgah	Auburn	
2018	Zipporah Broughton	Lee	Rutgers	
2017	Bianca Jackson	Brewbaker Tech	South Carolina	
2016	Jasmine Walker	Jeff Davis	Florida State/Alabama	2021 WNBA Draft: 1st Rnd, 7th overall by the Los Angeles Sparks
2015	Shaquera Wade	Huntsville	Alabama	
2014	Shakayla Thomas	Sylacauga	Florida State	
2013	Marqu'es Webb	Hoover	Vanderbilt	
2012	Jasmine Jones	Bob Jones	Tennessee	
2011	Hayden Hamby	West Morgan	Purdue	
2010	Kaneisha Horn	Ramsay	Alabama	
2009	Jala Harris	Bob Jones	UAB	
2008	Courtney Jones	Midfield	LSU	
2007	Katherine Graham	Ramsay	LSU	
2006	Shanavia Dowdell	Calera	LA Tech	2010 WNBA draft: 2nd Rnd, 18th overall by the Washington Mystics
2005	Whitney Boddie	Florence	Auburn	2009 WNBA draft: 2nd Rnd, 20th overall by the Sacramento Monarchs
2004	Starr Orr	Danville	MTSU	
2003	Sidney Spencer	Hoover	Tennessee	2007 WNBA draft: 2nd Rnd, 25th overall by the Los Angeles Sparks
2002	Kate Mastin	Boaz	Alabama	
2001	Donyel Wheeler	Huffman	Alabama	
2000	Natasha Thomas	Lawrence County	UAB	
1999	Tasheika Morris	Butler	Florida State	
1998	Gwen Jackson	Eufaula	Tennessee	2003 WNBA draft: 1st Rnd, 6th overall by the Indiana Fever
1997	April Nance	Butler		
1996	Nicole Carruth	Sulligent	Alabama	
1995	Heather Mayes	Fyffe	Western Kentucky	
1994	Pam Duncan	Carrollton High School	Alabama	
1993	Leah Monteith	Cherokee County	Alabama	
1992	Yolanda Watkins	Decatur	Alabama	
1991	Tonya Tice	Hamilton	Auburn	
1990	Karen Killen	Mars Hill Bible	Kentucky/Lipscomb	
1989	Leslie Claybrook	Saint James	Alabama	
1988	Jeaniece Slater	Hartselle High School	North Alabama	

== See also ==
Alabama Mr. Basketball
