= Kobe Prentice =

American football player (born 2004)

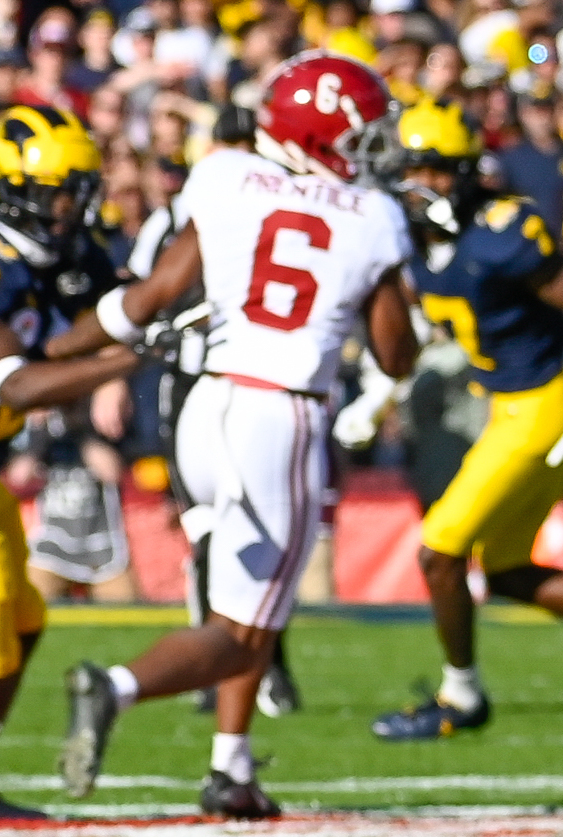

Profile
- Position: Wide receiver

Personal information
- Born: March 10, 2004 (age 22)
- Listed height: 5 ft 10 in (1.78 m)
- Listed weight: 184 lb (83 kg)

Career information
- High school: Calera (Calera, Alabama)
- College: Alabama (2022–2024); Baylor (2025)
- NFL draft: 2026: undrafted

Career history
- Carolina Panthers (2026)*; New England Patriots (2026)*; New York Giants (2026)*
- * Offseason or practice squad member only
- Stats at Pro Football Reference

Kobe Prentice (born March 10, 2004) is an American professional football wide receiver. He played college football for the Alabama Crimson Tide and Baylor Bears and he was signed as an undrafted free agent by the Carolina Panthers in 2026.

== Early life ==
Prentice attended Calera High School in Calera, Alabama. As a senior, he had 1,229 receiving yards and 19 touchdowns. He originally committed to the University of Maryland, College Park to play college football, but changed to the University of Alabama.

== College career ==
Prentice was named a starter his true freshman year at Alabama in 2022. In his first career game, he had five receptions for 60 yards.

=== College statistics ===
Year	Team	Receiving					Rushing		
Year	Team	GP	Rec	Yds	Avg	TD	Att	Yds	TD
2022	Alabama	10	31	337	10.9	2	0	0	0
2023	Alabama	8	18	314	17.4	2	0	0	0
2024	Alabama	4	7	92	13.1	1	0	0	0
Career		18	49	651	13.3	4	0	0	0

== Professional career ==
Pre-draft measurables
Height	Weight	Arm length	Hand span	Wingspan	40-yard dash	10-yard split	20-yard split	20-yard shuttle	Three-cone drill	Vertical jump	Broad jump	Bench press
5 ft 9 5/8 in (1.77 m)	184 lb (83 kg)	30 1/8 in (0.77 m)	9 1/8 in (0.23 m)	6 ft 1 5/8 in (1.87 m)	4.39 s	1.58 s	2.51 s	4.50 s	7.16 s	36.0 in (0.91 m)	10 ft 3 in (3.12 m)	12 reps
All values from Pro Day

=== Carolina Panthers ===
Prentice was signed as an undrafted free agent by the Carolina Panthers after the conclusion of the 2026 NFL draft. He was waived on July 24.

=== New England Patriots ===
On July 25, 2026, Prentice was claimed off waivers by the New England Patriots. On August 24, Prentice was waived by New England.

=== New York Giants ===
On August 26, 2026, Prentice was claimed off waivers by the New York Giants. He was released by the Giants three days later as a part of preliminary roster cuts.
