= Reniya Kelly =

American basketball player

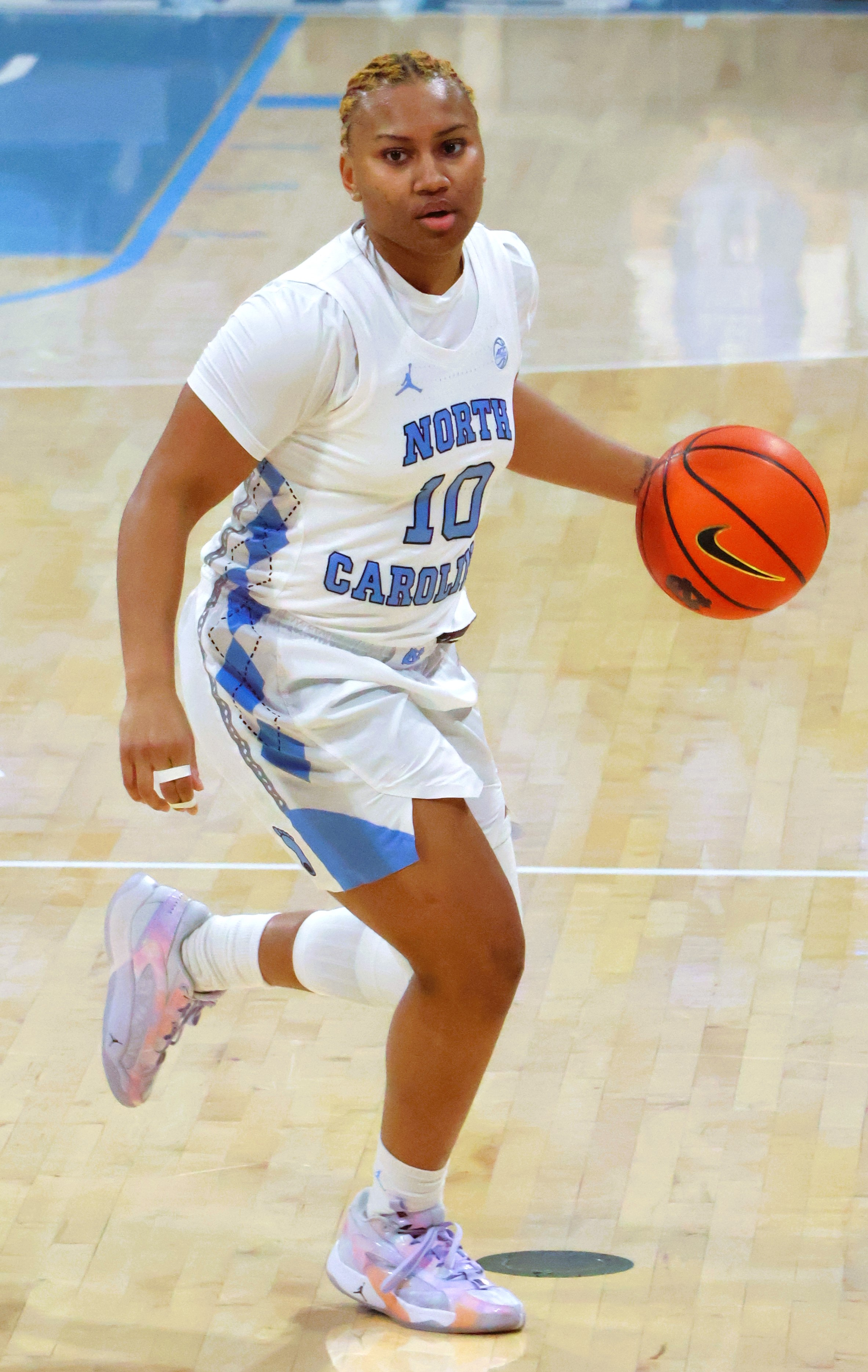
- Kelly with North Carolina in 2024

No. 10 – North Carolina Tar Heels
- Position: Guard
- League: Atlantic Coast Conference

Personal information
- Born: June 24, 2005 (age 21)
- Listed height: 5 ft 7 in (1.70 m)

Career information
- High school: Hoover (Hoover, Alabama)
- College: North Carolina (2023–present)

Career highlights
- Alabama Miss Basketball (2023)

Reniya Kelly is an American college basketball player for the North Carolina Tar Heels of the Atlantic Coast Conference (ACC).

== Early life and high school career ==
Kelly grew up in Hoover, Alabama, the daughter of Keri and Ural "U.J." Mitchell. Kelly played multiple sports growing up, including swimming, soccer, and basketball. She attended Hoover High School, where she won four Class 7A state championships in five seasons starting in eighth grade, being named tournament MVP each of her last three seasons. She set her school scoring record with 2,272 career points as she helped the team go 168–10 over her five years. In her senior season, she averaged 14.7 points, 5 assists, 4.9 rebounds, and 2.4 steals per game on 47 percent three-point shooting, being named the Alabama Miss Basketball and the Alabama Gatorade Player of the Year. Hoover retired her jersey in December 2023. Rated the sixth-best point guard and 30th-best player overall in the 2023 class by ESPN, she committed to North Carolina over offers from Alabama and Baylor.

== College career ==
=== Freshman season (2023–24) ===
Kelly debuted for the North Carolina Tar Heels on November 8, 2023, starting in the season-opening 102–49 win against Gardner–Webb. She was the first true freshman to start in her debut since Deja Kelly (no relation) in 2020. She came out of the starting rotation later that month and missed three games due to a head injury before working her way back into the lineup. On January 28, 2024, she scored a season-high 20 points in an 81–66 loss to Virginia. She missed the last stretch of the season due to a lower body injury, finishing her freshman season with 4.6 points per game in 20 games (10 starts).

== Career statistics ==
Legend
GP	Games played	GS	Games started	MPG	Minutes per game	RPG	Rebounds per game
APG	Assists per game	SPG	Steals per game	BPG	Blocks per game	PPG	Points per game
TO	Turnovers per game	FG%	Field-goal percentage	3P%	3-point field-goal percentage	FT%	Free-throw percentage
**Bold**	Career best	°	League leader

=== College ===
Year	Team	GP	GS	MPG	FG%	3P%	FT%	RPG	APG	SPG	BPG	TO	PPG
2023–24	UNC	21	11	18.4	38.5	26.8	85.7	1.7	1.3	0.6	0.0	**1.0**	4.6
2024–25	UNC	**33**	**33**	**27.3**	**41.0**	**41.2**	**86.4**	**2.7**	**2.1**	**1.1**	**0.1**	1.3	**9.6**
**Career**		54	44	23.9	40.4	37.0	86.2	2.3	1.8	0.9	0.1	1.2	7.7
Statistics retrieved from Sports-Reference.
