= Shelby County Airport (Alabama) =

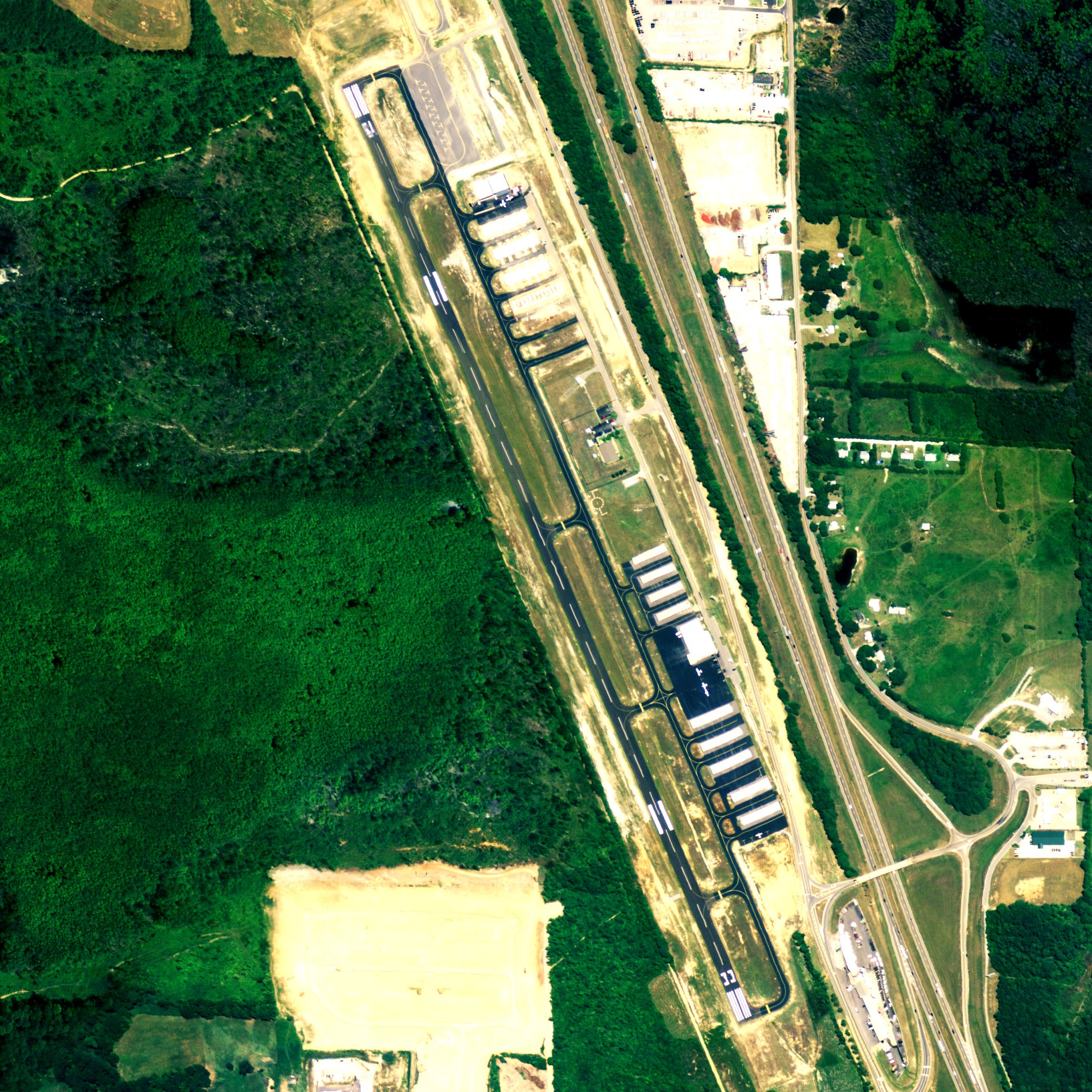
- NAIP aerial image, 2006
- IATA: none; ICAO: KEET; FAA LID: EET; WMO: 72230

Summary
- Airport type: Public
- Owner: Shelby County Commission
- Serves: Alabaster, Alabama
- Location: Calera, Alabama
- Elevation AMSL: 586 ft / 179 m
- Coordinates: 33°10′40″N 086°46′59″W
- Website: al-shelbycountytourism.civicplus.com
- Interactive map of Shelby County Airport

Runways
Direction	Length		Surface
Direction	ft	m	Surface
16/34	5,000	1,524	Asphalt

Statistics (2017)
- Aircraft operations (2016): 20,848
- Based aircraft: 78
- Source: Federal Aviation Administration

Shelby County Airport (ICAO: KEET, FAA LID: EET) is a public use airport located four nautical miles (7 km) southeast of the central business district of Alabaster, a city in Shelby County, Alabama, United States. It is owned by the Shelby County Commission. The airport is situated in the city of Calera.

This airport is included in the FAA's National Plan of Integrated Airport Systems for 2011–2015 and 2009–2013, both of which categorized it as a general aviation facility. This was a change from the 2007–2011 NPIAS Report, when it was categorized as a reliever airport.

Although most U.S. airports use the same three-letter location identifier for the FAA and IATA, this airport is assigned EET by the FAA but has no designation from the IATA.

== Facilities and aircraft ==
Shelby County Airport covers an area of 125 acres (51 ha) at an elevation of 586 feet (179 m) above mean sea level. It has one asphalt paved runway designated 16/34 which measures 5,000 by 75 feet (1,524 x 23 m). The runway runs parallel to adjacent Interstate 65. The airport has its own interchange on that highway.

For the 12-month period ending January 15, 2010, the airport had 20,848 aircraft operations, an average of 57 per day: 99% general aviation and 1% military. At that time there were 83 aircraft based at this airport: 92% single-engine, 7% multi-engine and 1% jet.

== See also ==
- List of airports in Alabama
