= Shanavia Dowdell =

American basketball player

No. 42 – AS Aulnoye-Aymeries
- Position: Forward
- League: LF2

Personal information
- Born: September 10, 1987 (age 39) Calera, Alabama, U.S.
- Listed height: 6 ft 2 in (1.88 m)

Career information
- High school: Calera (Calera, Alabama)
- College: Louisiana Tech (2006–2010)
- WNBA draft: 2010: 2nd round, 18th overall pick
- Drafted by: Washington Mystics
- Playing career: 2010–present

Career history
- 2010–2011: Toulouse Metropole
- 2011–2013: Townsville Fire
- 2012–2013: Rockhampton Cyclones
- 2013–2018: Declercq Waregem
- 2016–2018: Rockhampton Cyclones
- 2018–present: AS Aulnoye-Aymeries
- 2019–present: Brisbane Capitals

Career highlights
- 2× WAC Player of the Year (2009, 2010); WAC Tournament MVP (2010); WAC All-Defensive Team (2010); 2× First-team All-WAC (2009, 2010); WAC All-Freshman Team (2007); Alabama Miss Basketball (2006)
- Stats at Basketball Reference

Shanavia Dowdell (born September 10, 1987) is an American professional basketball player for Declercq Stortbeton Waregem in Belgium. She played college basketball at Louisiana Tech. In her senior year, she recorded 22 double doubles (double digits for two statistical categories) which was the most among all players in Division I basketball. She was the third leading rebounder in the nation, averaging 12.4 per game.

== Louisiana Tech statistics ==
Legend
GP	Games played	GS	Games started	MPG	Minutes per game
FG%	Field goal percentage	3P%	3-point field goal percentage	FT%	Free throw percentage
RPG	Rebounds per game	APG	Assists per game	SPG	Steals per game
BPG	Blocks per game	PPG	Points per game	**Bold**	Career high

Year	Team	GP	Points	FG%	3P%	FT%	RPG	APG	SPG	BPG	PPG
2006–07	Louisiana Tech	29	113	52.4	20.0	**71.9**	2.4	0.1	0.5	0.2	3.9
2007–08	Louisiana Tech	31	380	48.2	25.0	55.1	7.5	0.5	**1.2**	1.3	12.3
2008–09	Louisiana Tech	**33**	531	**53.3**	**35.7**	59.0	9.9	0.6	1.2	**1.8**	16.1
2009–10	Louisiana Tech	32	**575**	52.7	25.0	66.0	**12.4**	**1.3**	0.9	1.2	**18.0**
Career	Louisiana Tech	125	1599	51.7	27.9	61.6	8.2	0.6	1.0	1.2	12.8
