= Heart of Dixie Railroad Museum =

Railroad museum in Calera, Alabama

HODRRM
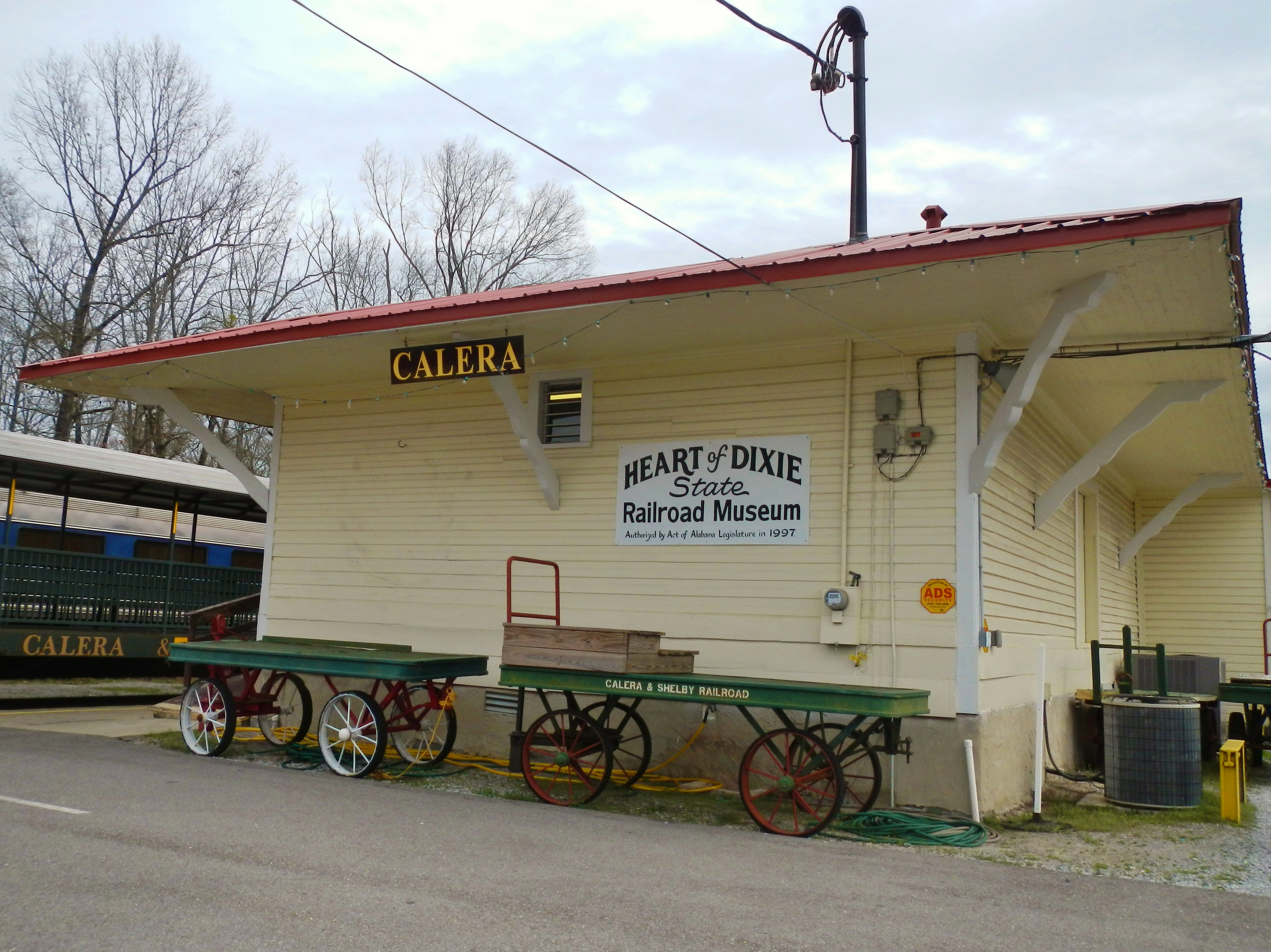
- The Heart of Dixie Railroad Calera depot in Calera, Alabama
- Locale: Calera, Shelby County, Alabama, United States
- Coordinates: 33.09898°N 86.750777°W

Commercial operations
- Built by: Louisville and Nashville Railroad
- Original gauge: 4 ft 8 1/2 in (1,435 mm) standard gauge

Preserved operations
- Owned by: Heart of Dixie Railroad Museum
- Operated by: Heart of Dixie Railroad Museum
- Reporting mark: CSMX
- Length: 5.5 mi (8.9 km)
- Preserved gauge: 4 ft 8 1/2 in (1,435 mm); 2 ft (610 mm)

Commercial history
- Opened: 1962

Preservation history
- Present: In operation
- Headquarters: Calera, AL

Website
- http://www.hodrrm.org

The Heart of Dixie Railroad Museum (initialised HOD, reporting mark CSMX) is a heritage railroad museum of Alabama. Dedicated to the preservation, restoration, and operation of historically significant railway equipment, the museum is located at 1919 Ninth Street, Calera, Alabama, on I-65 approximately 30 miles (48 km) south of Birmingham.

The museum features a wide range of locomotives, cars and other railroad equipment that dates from the 19th century to the 1950s and operates regularly scheduled excursions with museum equipment over the museum's track. It also features two depots that are approximately 100 years old.

== Overview ==
The museum operates a heritage railroad that offers two excursion trains every Saturday from March to December. It also operates excursions on special dates such as Halloween and Christmas. The standard gauge train operates with a diesel locomotive on a 5.5-mile (8.9 km) section of the former Alabama Mineral Railroad, a division of the Louisville and Nashville Railroad. The museum offers visitors the opportunity to ride in the cab of the locomotive and in a caboose in addition to the enclosed and open-air passenger cars.

Additionally, the museum operates a 2 ft (610 mm) narrow gauge live steam engine locomotive and passenger cars on a one-quarter-mile (0.4 km) long loop. This train served the nearby Birmingham Zoo for many years before being placed into operation at the museum.

The museum is an active chapter of the National Railway Historical Society.

The museum’s 2026 operating season spans from March 7 – December 19. Departures are on Saturdays at 10:00am and 1:00pm Central Standard Time. However, some of the special events may include a third departure at 3:00pm Central Standard Time, and/or include additional departures on Sundays and/or Fridays.

=== Collection ===
The museum maintains three operating first generation diesel-electric locomotives for powering excursion trains and shop switching. Six additional diesel-electric locomotives are presented as static displays as well as two electric shop locomotives. Builders represented include GM Electro-Motive Division, Whitcomb, Baldwin, Alco, and Fairbanks-Morse.

Though none are in service, the museum also has four steam locomotives on display. While lacking much of its original operating equipment and gauges, the cab of the 1924 Woodward Iron Baldwin 2-8-0 locomotive is open to the public and is equipped with wooden stairs for visitors. Two other steam locomotives have also been cosmetically restored for display, including a unique 1953 fireless steam powered switching locomotive operated by Alabama Power Company which did not have a firebox, but instead received steam from the plant's boilers and used that stored steam to operate for about four hours a charge. Builders displayed include Baldwin, Alco, Lima, and Davenport.

The museum displays over forty pieces of rolling stock, spanning the early-to-late 20th century including passenger, railway post office, and freight cars. Numerous passenger cars have been restored and are now used on the museum's excursions. Birthday parties are hosted in a restored dining car adjacent to the visitors center. Many of the freight and passenger cars are awaiting restoration from damage previously incurred while stored in an unsecured location. The museum’s oldest operational passenger car is the Frisco Coach No. 1062.

=== Specialty equipment ===
Among the museum's collection are two heavy-duty rail mounted cranes used in construction and wreck-clearing duty. Additionally, the museum has several railcars that once belonged to the United States Air Force Strategic Air Command which were to be used as part of the Peacekeeper Intercontinental Ballistic Missile program which planned the rail-based deployment of such missiles.

=== Stations ===
The museum includes two former community railway stations in its collection. The former Wilton, Alabama depot, now signed for Calera, houses many railroad artifact displays and serves as the station for excursion trains. The former Woodlawn, Alabama depot houses the Boone Library of railroad books, slides, photographs and other research materials.

=== Signals ===
A signal garden continues to be developed between the Calera depot and the main museum visitor center which features working crossing signals, a semaphore, and other railroad signals.

=== Interior displays ===
The Calera depot houses a collection of railroad artifact displays focusing on the history of railroads in Alabama. Exhibits include railway lanterns, locomotive headlights, rail cross sections, and passenger train china and silver ware. The Boone Library in the Woodlawn depot and adjacent railcar contains print and other media as well as an extensive collection of old maps, track diagrams, timetables, technical manuals, etc. for public research use.

== History ==
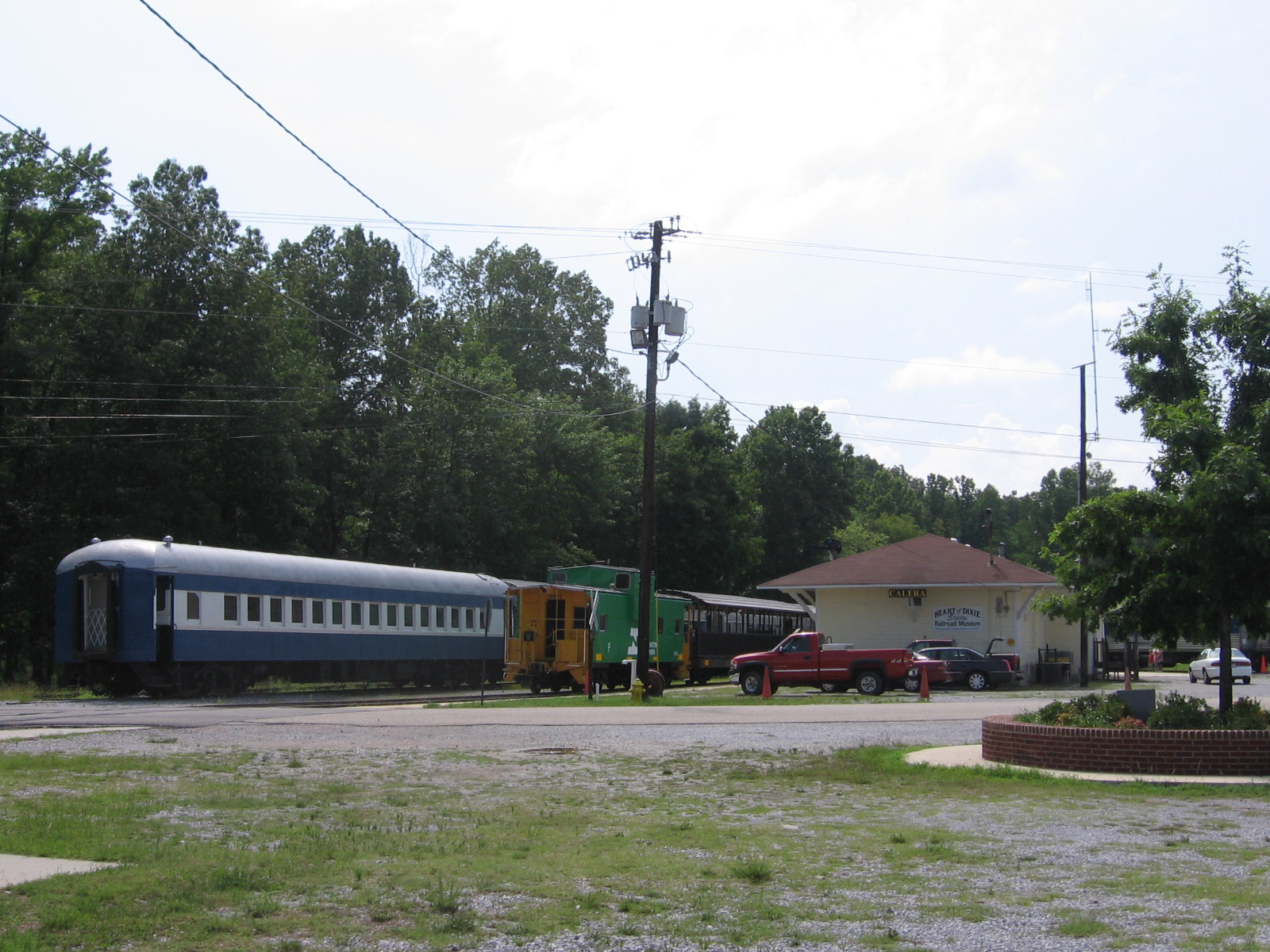
Calera, Alabama (formerly Wilton, Alabama) depot and excursion train at the Heart of Dixie Railroad Museum.

- The Heart of Dixie Railroad Museum, Inc. began as the Heart of Dixie Railroad Club. Its first location was at 18th Street South and 1st Avenue South in downtown Birmingham, across from the Alabama Power Steam Generation Plant. The cars were largely donated to the club by their respective railroads. However, the cars were vulnerable to vandals. Several cars were burned in different disputes over territory by homeless people. In the early 1980s, the Club moved to Calera and secured several hundred acres of land between 17th Avenue and 20th Avenue along 9th Street.
- The Calera & Shelby Railroad (the 4 ft 8 1/2 in (1,435 mm) standard gauge trains) runs along a 5 1/2-mile (8.9 km) section of the former L&N Mineral loop, constructed in 1891 to collect the minerals necessary for making iron, then looping back to Birmingham to drop off the minerals at the local ironworks. The line was abandoned when Alabama Power dammed up the Coosa River for a new hydroelectric plant. This would have flooded the bridge over the Coosa River, which was subsequently removed. CSX later pulled up the rails along the line. Eleven miles (18 km) of right-of-way were purchased by the Heart of Dixie Railroad Club (now Heart of Dixie Railroad Museum, Inc.) when they moved to Calera in the 1980s. Since then, the museum has been replacing the track along the right-of-way. The track currently ends at Springs Junction, Alabama, just east of its crossing of Shelby County Highway 86.
- The Shelby & Southern Railroad (the 2 ft (610 mm) narrow gauge train) rolling stock is the former park train of the Birmingham Zoo. Some 2 ft (610 mm) gauge track was purchased, a station and maintenance shed were built, the cars were sandblasted, re-lettered, and re-painted, and the propane-fired, Crown Metal Products 4-4-0 steam engine was sent to the Tweetsie Railroad for refurbishment. The S&S opened in 2002 during "Day Out with Thomas", a two-weekend period where Thomas the Tank Engine comes to visit the museum between March and April. However, the museum has not hosted "Day Out with Thomas" since 2019.

== Equipment ==
=== Locomotives ===
Locomotive details
Number	Image	Type	Model	Built	Builder	Status
3		Steam	0-4-0	1910	American Locomotive Company	Under restoration
38		Steam	2-8-0	1924	Baldwin Locomotive Works	Display
40		Fireless	0-4-0	1924	Davenport Locomotive Works	Display
4046		Steam	0-6-0	1944	Lima Locomotive Works	Display
82		Diesel	HH900	1937	American Locomotive Company	Display, operable
37		Diesel	S-8	1937	Baldwin Locomotive Works	Display
904		Diesel	SW1	1942	Electro-Motive Diesel	Display
2019		Diesel	SW8	1951	Electric-Motive Diesel	Operational
2022		Diesel	SW8	1951	Electric-Motive Diesel	Operational
2430		Diesel	35-ton center cab	1953	Euclid Company	Display
1850		Diesel	H-12-44	1953	Fairbanks-Morse	Display, awaiting possible restoration
520-020		Diesel	52-ton center cab	1940s	Plymouth Locomotive Works	Display
2		Diesel	25-ton switcher	1951	Whitcomb Company	Operational

=== Rolling stock ===
Rolling stock details
Number	Image	Type	Built	Builder	Status
329		Baggage car	Unknown	Unknown	Display
467		Baggage car	1928	Bethlehem Steel Corporation	Display
1550, 1551		Baggage cars	1949	Pullman Company	Display
4527		Baggage car/Commissary car	1915	Pullman Company	Operational
805		Baggage car	1929	St. Louis Car Company	Display
59, 7715		Gallery car	1960	Pullman Company	Operational
4741		Coach	1947	Chicago, Burlington and Quincy Railroad	Operational
198		Dining car	1951	Budd Company	Operational
1062		Coach	1910	American Car and Foundry Company	Operational
3050		Lounge car	1926	Pullman Company	Under restoration
2972		Coach	1956	Unknown	Operational
892		Dome car	1948	Budd Company	Operational
1121, 1122		Open-air cars	1940, 1942	Unknown	Operational
30, 76		Post office cars	1928	American Car and Foundry Company	Display
2823		Chair car	1953	Budd Company	Operational
2931		Chair car	1950	Budd Company	Operational
4141		Dining car	1917	Pullman Company	Display
None		Sleeper car	1924	Pullman Company	Display
40240		Boxcar	1938	Unknown	Display
9003, 9004, 9007		Boxcars	1962	Unknown	Display
6907		Caboose	1952	International Car Company	Operational
1400		Material handling car	1986	Unknown	Display
10522		Caboose	1970	International Car Company	Operational
X201		Caboose	1971	Unknown	Operational
X458, X461		Cabooses	1970	Gantt Manufacturing Company	Display
PS46		Boxcar	Unknown	Pullman Company	Stored, out of service
100x		Caboose	Unknown	Unknown	Stored, out of service
99x		Caboose	1951	Unknown	Stored, out of service
C-53		Air Command rail car	Unknown	Unknown	Display
41326		Flatcar	1890s	Unknown	Stored, out of service
403		Flatcar	1920s	Unknown	Stored, out of service
21417		Flatcar	1956	American Car and Foundry Company	Stored, out of service
38101		Flatcar	1951	Magor Car Corporation	Stored, out of service
38485		Flatcar	1951	Magor Car Corporation	Stored, out of service
38558		Flatcar	1951	Magor Car Corporation	Stored, out of service
38623		Flatcar	1951	Magor Car Corporation	Stored, out of service
51043		Flatcar	Unknown	Unknown	Stored, out of service
51043		Tanker car	1920s	Unknown	Stored, out of service
42476		Wooden camp car	1921	Unknown	Display

== See also ==
- Birmingham District
- List of United States railroads
  - List of Alabama railroads
- List of heritage railroads in the United States
- List of railway museums
