= Sarah Ashlee Barker =

American basketball player (born 2001)

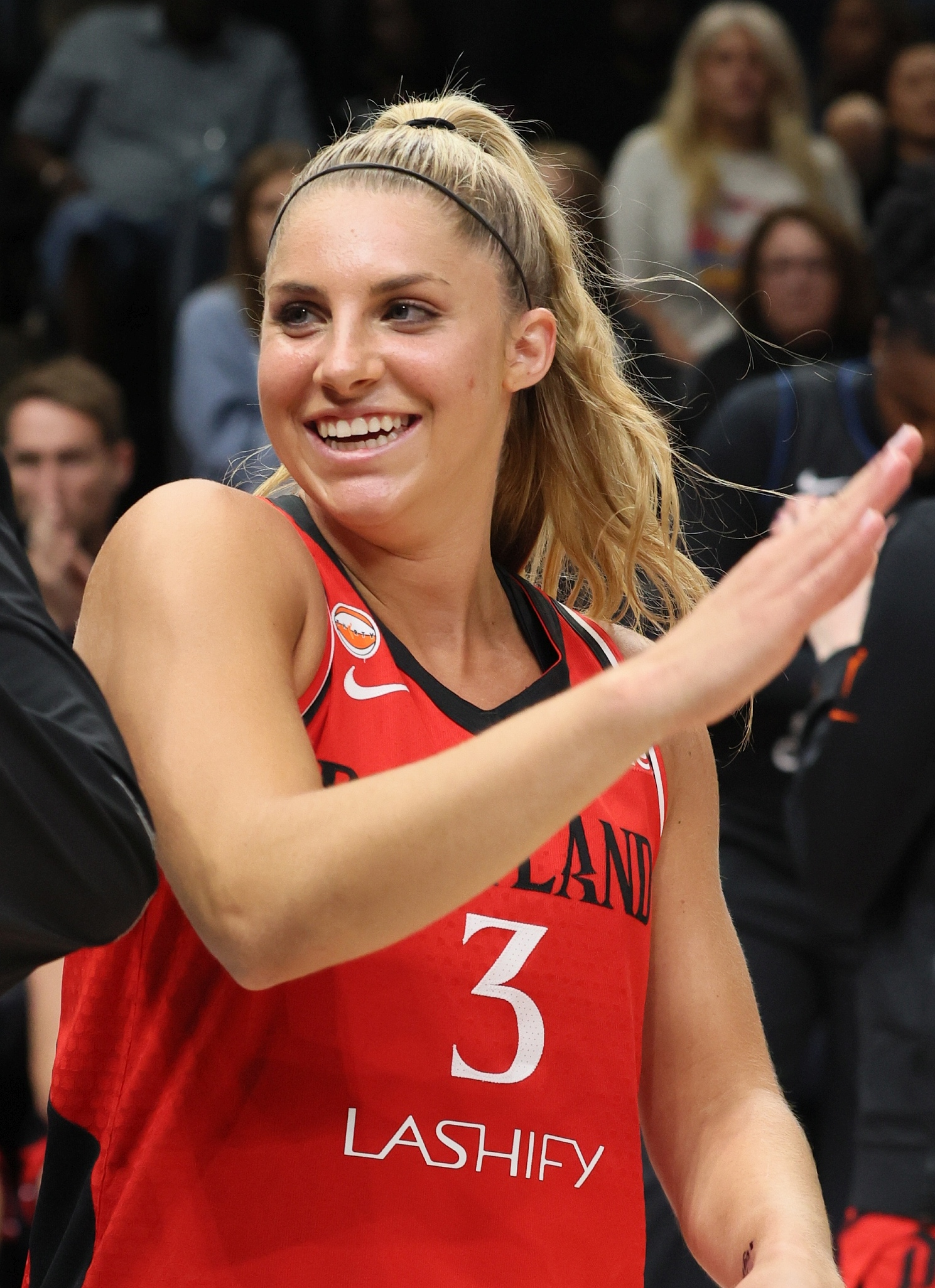
- Barker with the Portland Fire in 2026

No. 3 – Portland Fire
- Position: Guard
- League: WNBA

Personal information
- Born: September 10, 2001 (age 25) Birmingham, Alabama, U.S.
- Listed height: 6 ft 0 in (1.83 m)
- Listed weight: 173 lb (78 kg)

Career information
- High school: Spain Park (Hoover, Alabama)
- College: Georgia (2020–2022); Alabama (2022–2025)
- WNBA draft: 2025: 1st round, 9th overall pick
- Drafted by: Los Angeles Sparks
- Playing career: 2025–present

Career history
- 2025: Los Angeles Sparks
- 2026–present: Portland Fire

Career highlights
- 2× First-team All-SEC (2024, 2025); SEC All-Freshman Team (2021); Alabama Miss Basketball (2020)
- Stats at Basketball Reference

Sarah Ashlee Barker (born September 10, 2001) is an American professional basketball player for the Portland Fire of the Women's National Basketball Association (WNBA) and Athletes Unlimited Pro Basketball. She played college basketball for the Georgia Lady Bulldogs and Alabama Crimson Tide of the Southeastern Conference. She was selected ninth overall by the Los Angeles Sparks in the 2025 WNBA draft.

== Early life ==
As an eighth-grader, Barker was diagnosed with osteochondritis dissecans, a joint condition that eventually required a major four-hour surgery and left her on crutches for six months.

== High school career ==
Barker played basketball for Spain Park High School in Hoover, Alabama. She was the 2020 Alabama Gatorade player of the year, 2020 Alabama Sports Writers Association Miss Basketball, and a two-time ASWA Class 7A state player of the year. She averaged 23.2 points, 9.9 rebounds, 1.9 steals, and scored more than 2,000 points. On October 8 2018, she committed to Georgia.

== College career ==
=== Georgia (2020–2022) ===
In her freshman year, Barker played in 24 games, averaging 5.1 points and 2.7 rebounds per game. She had career highs against App State, with 12 points, 5 assists, and 5 steals. Barker was named to the SEC All-Freshman team. As a sophomore, Barker started every game and scored 14 points in a win against Notre Dame. At the end of the season, she transferred to Alabama.

=== Alabama (2022–2025) ===
As a senior, Barker started and played in 33 games, and surpassed 1,000 career points on February 18. She scored a career-high 34 points against Kentucky on January 28. Barker was named to the first-team All-SEC. In her senior year, Barker led Alabama with 17.2 points per game and 2.0 steals per game. She tied her career-high of eight assists against Georgia, Mississippi State, and Green Bay. She was named as a top 10 finalist for the Ann Meyers Drysdale Award. In a double-overtime loss to Maryland in the 2025 NCAA women's basketball tournament, Barker scored a program-high 45 points.

== Professional career ==
=== Los Angeles Sparks (2025–2026) ===
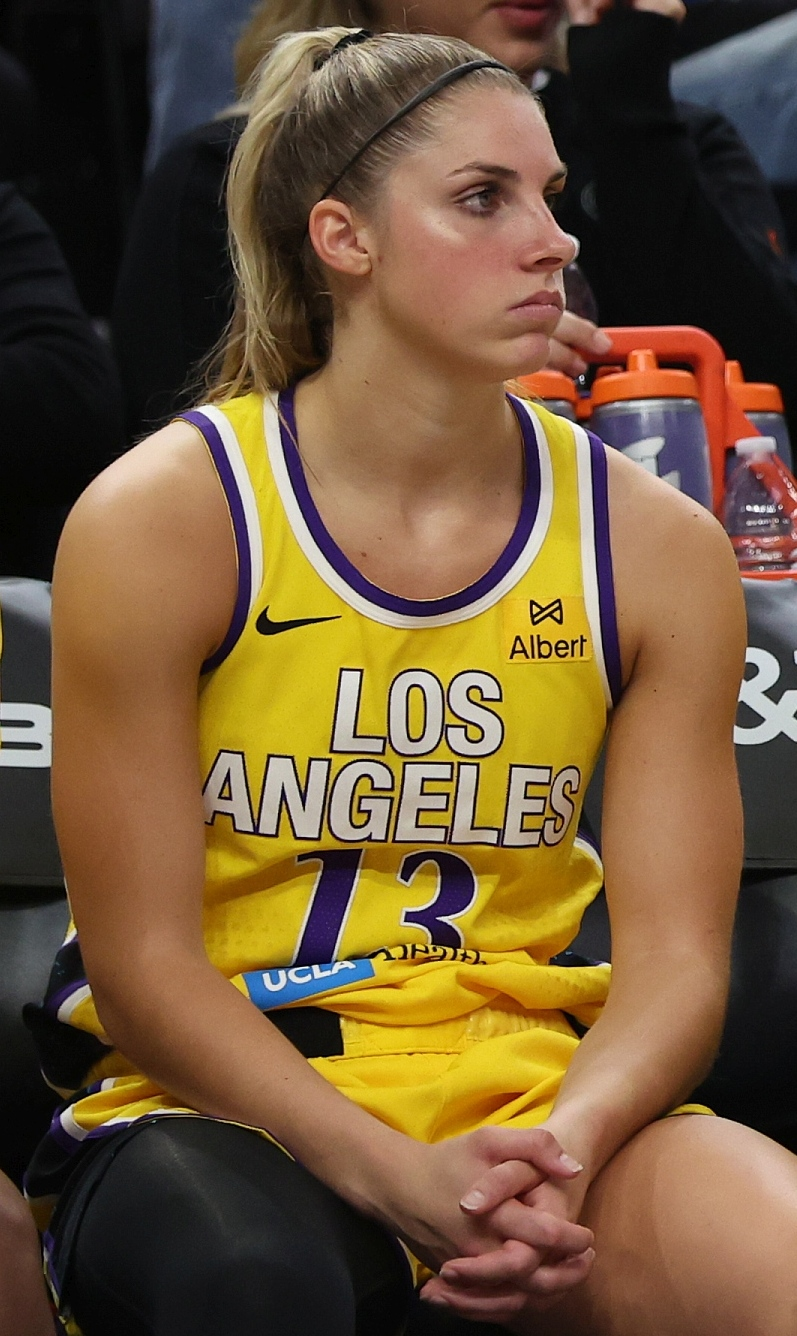
Barker with the Los Angeles Sparks in 2025

On April 14, 2025, Barker was selected ninth overall by the Los Angeles Sparks in the 2025 WNBA draft.

=== Portland Fire (2026–present) ===
On April 3, 2026, Barker was selected by the Portland Fire in the 2026 expansion draft. On May 9 she played in the Fire's first-ever league game. In 26 games for Portland, she averaged 10.7 points, 4.5 rebounds, and 2.4 assists. On July 22, Barker suffered a torn ACL during a game against the Dallas Wings; she underwent successful surgery on August 5.

=== Athletes Unlimited ===
In October 2025, Barker joined Athletes Unlimited Pro Basketball for its fifth season, adding to her professional experience following her rookie year in the WNBA.

== Career statistics ==
=== WNBA ===
Legend
GP	Games played	GS	Games started	MPG	Minutes per game	RPG	Rebounds per game
APG	Assists per game	SPG	Steals per game	BPG	Blocks per game	PPG	Points per game
TO	Turnovers per game	FG%	Field-goal percentage	3P%	3-point field-goal percentage	FT%	Free-throw percentage
**Bold**	Career best	°	League leader

==== Regular season ====
Stats current through end of 2025 season

WNBA regular season statistics
Year	Team	GP	GS	MPG	FG%	3P%	FT%	RPG	APG	SPG	BPG	TO	PPG
2025	Los Angeles	34	8	14.1	.337	.295	.708	1.9	0.9	0.3	0.1	1.1	3.1
**Career**	1 year, 1 team	34	8	14.1	.337	.295	.708	1.9	0.9	0.3	0.1	1.1	3.1

=== College ===
Legend
GP	Games played	GS	Games started	MPG	Minutes per game	RPG	Rebounds per game
APG	Assists per game	SPG	Steals per game	BPG	Blocks per game	PPG	Points per game
TO	Turnovers per game	FG%	Field-goal percentage	3P%	3-point field-goal percentage	FT%	Free-throw percentage
**Bold**	Career best	°	League leader

Year	Team	GP	GS	MPG	FG%	3P%	FT%	RPG	APG	SPG	BPG	TO	PPG
2020–21	Georgia	24	0	16.7	33.3	27.8	58.8	2.7	1.2	0.8	0.2	**1.5**	5.1
2021–22	Georgia	31	31	25.3	35.9	30.7	**72.7**	4.0	2.4	1.3	0.4	2.1	7.7
2022–23	Alabama	31	28	23.4	38.2	29.3	64.8	4.8	2.3	1.5	0.6	2.3	6.9
2023–24	Alabama	**33**	**33**	30.0	49.1	35.3	71.1	**6.3**	2.9	1.9	0.5	3.1	16.8
2024–25	Alabama	28	28	**31.7**	**51.4**	**37.5**	70.9	**6.3**	**3.9**	**2.0**	**0.8**	3.3	**18.2**
**Career**		147	120	25.8	44.3	32.9	69.0	4.9	2.6	1.5	0.5	2.5	11.2
Statistics retrieved from Sports-Reference.

== Personal life ==
Barker is the daughter of former professional football player Jay Barker, who was the starting quarterback of Alabama's 1992 national championship winning team, and stepdaughter of country music singer-songwriter Sara Evans. Barker is a Christian.
