= Yolanda Watkins =

American basketball player

Personal information
- Listed height: 6 ft 2 in (1.88 m)

Career information
- High school: Decatur (Decatur, Alabama)
- College: Alabama (1992–1997)
- Position: Center

Career highlights
- First-team All-SEC (1994); SEC All-Freshman Team (1993); Naismith Prep Player of the Year (1992); Alabama Miss Basketball (1992)

Yolanda Watkins Smith (born 1973 or 1974) is a former basketball player turned mental health professional. As an Alabama High School Athletic Association player, Watkins and Decatur High School won the 6A division title from 1990 to 1992 before she accumulated 2801 career points. During this time period, she won the 16U and 18U AAU titles with her basketball teams. Her 1995 rebounds with Decatur was a state career record until 2000. Some awards that Watkins won in 1992 include Alabama Miss Basketball and Naismith Prep Player of the Year Award.

With the University of Alabama, Watkins played in the Final Four at the 1994 NCAA Division I women's basketball tournament and had the most season points that year. After leaving Alabama in 1997, Watkins set career records with 1996 rebounds and 187 blocks. Her block record was surpassed in 2019 and her 1778 points put her in the top five for the university. In 2004, Watkins became a SEC Great for the Southeastern Conference. During the late 2010s, she held mental health positions for the Alabama Department of Mental Health and Virginia.

== Early life and education ==
Yolanda Watkins was born in Decatur, Alabama during the 1970s. Religion and basketball were her childhood interests. In 1989, Watkins began her girls basketball experience at Decatur High School. With Decatur, Watkins won the 6A division as an Alabama High School Athletic Association competitor in 1990 and was the Most Valuable Player. It was the first time that Decatur won the 6A event held by the AHSAA. Her team re-won the 6A division in 1991 and 1992. With Decatur, she had the nicknames "Yo-Yo" and "Yo".

Overall, Watkins had 1995 rebounds while accumulating 2801 points by 1992. That year, Watkins led these two career categories in girls basketball for Alabama. Watkins continued to lead in rebounds until she was surpassed by Candace Byrd in 2000. During the early 2020s, she was in the top five for most rebounds and top thirty for most points by an AHSAA girls basketball player. As an American girls basketball player, she was number two for most rebounds in 1992. By the mid 2000s, her career rebounds was in the top five as a National Federation of State High School Associations player.

== AAU and college basketball ==
As an AAU competitor, Watkins participated at the 1990 AAU Junior Olympic Games. That year, she won the 16U title with the Alabama All Stars. In 1991, she won the 18U event with the Tennessee CJs. Watkins was named Most Valuable Player for both of these national AAU events. In 1992, she wanted to become an Olympian while she was "an instructor at the Blue-Gray girls basketball camp".

That year, the University of Alabama gave her an athletic scholarship. With Alabama, Watkins played in the semi-finals of the 1993 SEC women's basketball tournament. Watkins and her team reached the Final Four at the 1994 NCAA Division I women's basketball tournament. That year, she had the most season points for Alabama. During 1995, Watkins experienced a concussion and an anterior cruciate ligament injury.

She underwent surgery and rehabilitation throughout 1995 for her knee injury. Watkins resumed playing in 1996. She experienced tendinitis the following year. After ending her time at Alabama in 1997, her 1096 rebounds and 187 blocks had remained as Alabama career records by 2017. Watkins's block record was surpassed by Ashley Knight in 2019. During 2023, she was leading in rebounds while her 1778 career points was in the top five.

== Career ==
While at Alabama during 1997, Watkins had decided to not play women's basketball and instead become a student teacher. Watkins went to Tuscaloosa County that year for training and taught children. The following year, she returned to the university and worked in strength training as a graduate assistant. During 2011, she was a Wayne's Farms executive while also working as a caregiver. Watkins was "a supervisor of group homes" with the Alabama Department of Mental Health in 2017. By 2019, Yolanda Watkins Smith had an intellectual disability position in Virginia.

== Awards and honors ==
Watkins was on the High School All-America Girls Basketball Team in 1990 and 1991 for Parade. She was selected for a Kodak All-America team in 1992. From the Alabama Sports Writers Association, Watkins was player of the year in 1991 for 6A schools.

During 1992, Watkins was both player of the year for 6A schools and Alabama Miss Basketball from the ASWA. Watkins was also the Gatorade Girls Basketball Player of the Year for Alabama. As an American girls basketball player, Watkins received the Naismith Prep Player of the Year Award. She also was the Player of the Year for USA Today and Parade.

In 2003, Watkins became part of the 30-Year Anniversary Team created by the Birmingham Tip-Off Club. She became a SEC Great for the Southeastern Conference in 2004. That year, Watkins was also one of the top Alabama participants at the SEC Tournament according to The Tennessean. She joined the Morgan County Sports Hall of Fame in 2017. During 2022, Alabama chose her as one of "50 women who have blazed the trails and become legends in athletics".
