= Calera High School =

Public school in Calera, Alabama, United States

Coordinates: 33°6′14″N 86°43′17″W

Location
- 100 Calera Eagle Drive; Calera, Alabama, Shelby County, Alabama 35040; United States

Information
- Type: Public
- Motto: Fly as one
- Established: 1927 (99 years ago)
- School district: Shelby County Schools
- CEEB code: 010555
- Administrator: Maurice Whiting and Kelsey Collum
- Principal: Jennifer McCaleb
- Teaching staff: 57.00 (FTE)
- Grades: 9-12
- Enrollment: 1,018 (2024-2025)
- Student to teacher ratio: 17.86
- Hours in school day: 7
- Campus type: Suburban
- Colors: Colonial blue, white, and navy
- Mascot: Eagle
- National ranking: 6,602
- Feeder schools: Calera Middle School
- Website: www.shelbyed.k12.al.us/o/cahs

Calera High School is a high school in Calera, Alabama. The principal is Jennifer McCaleb.

== Student profile ==
For the 2022–23 school year, Calera High School has 970 students enrolled. Within that number, 49% of students are white, 38% of students are black, 11% of students are Hispanic, 2% of students are of two or more races, and 1% of students are Asian-American. 40% of students qualify for free or reduced-priced lunches.

== Athletics ==
The athletic teams compete in the 6A division of Alabama High School Athletic Association competition.

=== State championships ===
Basketball: 1996, 1997, 2006

== Band ==
The Calera High School Marching Band, also known as The Soaring Sound of Dixie, is the largest organization at the school.

In the 2022 season, they won best in class 3A in all categories and most entertaining at the Midsouth Marching Festival.

== Notable alumni ==
- Shanavia Dowdell (2006), forward who was drafted by the Washington Mystics, played college basketball for the Louisiana Tech Lady Techsters
- Kobe Prentice (2022), wide receiver for the Carolina Panthers
