= EMD SW8 =

Model of 800 hp North American diesel switcher

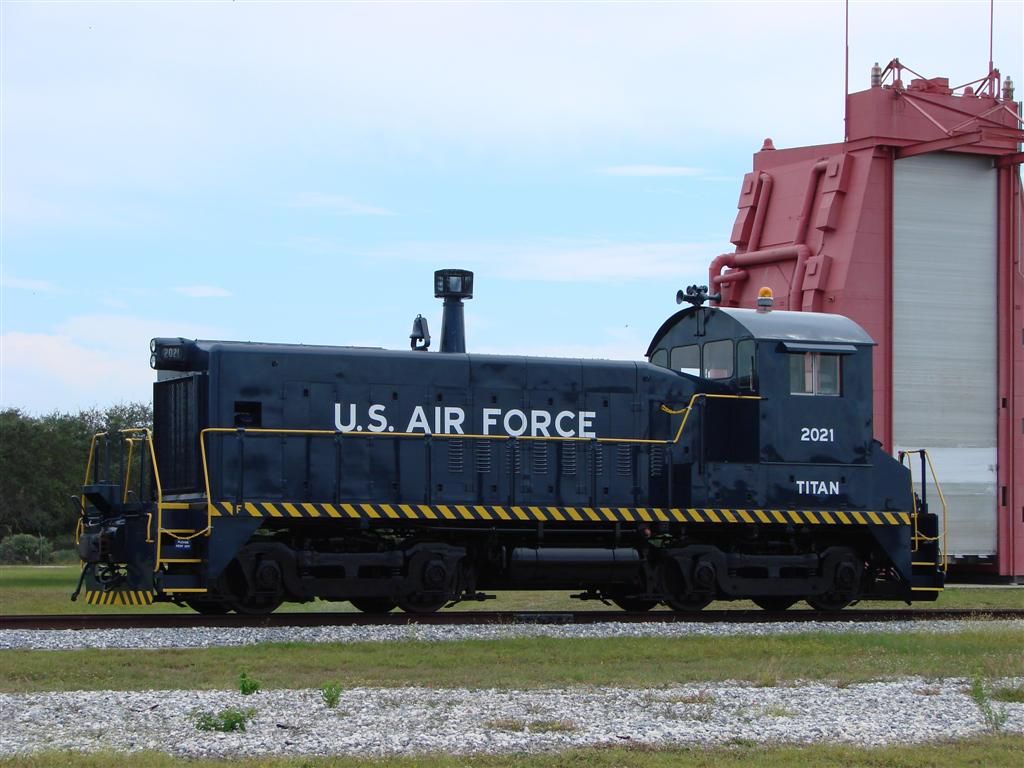
- EMD SW8 retired from the USAF Titan missile program
Type and origin
- Power type: Diesel–electric
- Builder: General Motors Electro-Motive Division; General Motors Diesel (GMD, Canada)
- Model: SW8, TR6
- Build date: September 1950 – February 1954
- Total produced: EMD SW8: 310; GMD SW8: 65; EMD TR6A: 12; EMD TR6B: 12
Specifications
- Configuration
  - AAR: B-B
  - UIC: Bo’Bo’
- Gauge: 4 ft 8 1/2 in (1,435 mm) standard gauge
- Length: 44 ft 5 in (13.54 m)
- Width: 9 ft 11.6 in (3.038 m)
- Height: 14 ft 6.2 in (4.425 m)
- Loco weight: 230,000 lb (104,326 kg)
- Prime mover: EMD 8-567B
- Engine type: V8 Two-stroke diesel
- Aspiration: Roots-type supercharger
- Cylinders: 8
Performance figures
- Maximum speed: 65 mph (105 km/h)
- Power output: 800 hp (600 kW)
- Tractive effort
  - Starting: 57,000 lbf (254 kN) at 25%
  - Continuous: 36,000 lbf (160 kN) at 11 mph (18 km/h)
Career
- Locale: North America; South Korea

The EMD SW8 is a diesel switcher locomotive manufactured by General Motors Electro-Motive Division and General Motors Diesel between September 1950 and February 1954. Power is supplied by an EMD 567B 8-cylinder engine, for a total of 800 hp (600 kW). A total of 310 of this model were built for United States railroads and 65 for Canadian railroads. Starting in October 1953 a number of SW8s were built with either the 567BC or 567C engine.

The SW8 was succeeded in EMD's product catalogue by the slightly more powerful SW900, introduced in December 1953.

== US Army SW8s ==
Two examples of these locomotives, ex-USAX #2019 and #2022, are preserved at the Heart of Dixie Railroad Museum in Alabama. After serving in Korea, #2019 was sent back to the manufacturer for reconditioning in 1953. #2022 was rebuilt in 1955. Both served in military bases in the United States until the early 1990s, finishing their careers at Fort Campbell, Ky. The Heart of Dixie Railroad Museum acquired them in 1995.

== Original buyers ==
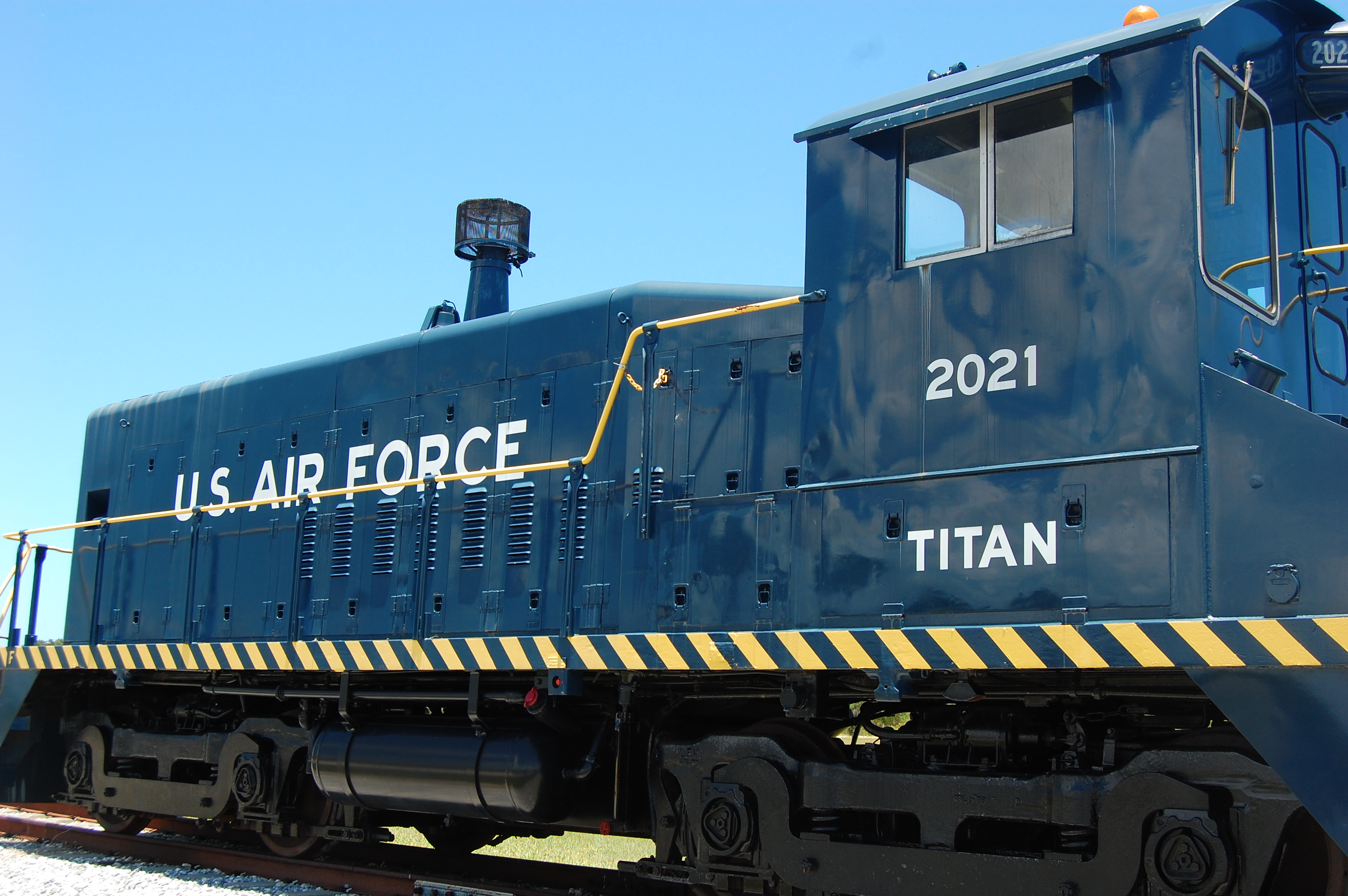
EMD SW8 used at Cape Canaveral Air Force Station for Titan missile

=== SW8 ===
==== Locomotives built by Electro-Motive Division, USA ====
Railroad	Quantity	Road numbers	Notes
Electro-Motive Division (plant)	1	105	Built as model DH-2
Electro-Motive Division (demonstrator)	1	800	to Illinois Terminal Railroad 725
Electro-Motive Division (demonstrator)	1	801	to Georgia Northern Railway 801
Electro-Motive Division (demonstrator)	1	500	to Cuyahoga Valley Railway 855
Aliquippa and Southern Railroad	3	800–802	Built with 567BC engines
Atlantic Coast Line Railroad	10	50–59	
Bamberger Railroad	2	601–602	
Boston and Maine Railroad	8	800–807	
Canton Railroad	4	40–43	42-43 were built with 567C engines
Cedar Rapids and Iowa City Railway ("Crandic")	3	91–93	Built with 567BC engines
Chicago and North Western Railway	1	801	
Chicago, St. Paul, Minneapolis and Omaha Railway ("Omaha Road")	4	126–129	
Chicago, Rock Island and Pacific Railroad	28	811–838	836-838 were built with 567BC engines. 838 was acquired by Pfizer Incorporated in 1989 and then donated to the Danbury Railway Museum in 2002.
Chicago, West Pullman and Southern Railroad	5	42–46	
Cincinnati Union Terminal	8	30–37	
Colorado and Wyoming Railway	12	201–212	
Columbia Iron and Steel	1	1	
Delaware, Lackawanna and Western Railroad	11	501–511	
De Queen and Eastern Railroad	1	D-3	
Detroit, Toledo and Ironton Railroad	2	900–901	
Donora Southern Raileoad	10	802–811	
Great Northern Railway	3	98–99, 101	98–99 to Burlington Northern. 101 was rebuilt from an NW1
L.G. Everist Incorporated	1	61	
Lake Terminal Railroad	4	821–824	
Lakeside and Marblehead Railroad	2	13–14	
Lehigh Valley Railroad	29	128–129, 250–276	256-273 built with dynamic brakes.
Louisiana and North West Railroad	2	40–41	
Ludington and Northern Railroad	1	16	Currently operational as Kendallville Terminal #16.
Merchants Despatch Transportation	1	15	
Monessen Southwestern Railway	2	22, 26	
New Orleans Union Passenger Terminal	3	1–3	Built with 567BC engines
New York Central Railroad	26	9602–9627	To Penn Central then Conrail 8602–8627, 8618 is preserved on the Strasburg Railroad
New York Central Railroad (Chicago River and Indiana Railroad)	2	9600–9601	To Penn Central then Conrail 8600-8601
New York, Chicago and St. Louis Railroad ("Nickel Plate Road")	8	107–114	
North Louisiana and Gulf Railroad	2	37–38	Built with 567BC engines
Pittsburgh Coke and Chemical Company	1	4	
Poplar Ridge Coal	1	801	
Reserve Mining Company	2	1200–1201	
Roscoe, Snyder and Pacific Railway	1	200	
South Shore Railway	1	12	to Illinois Central Railroad 802
Southern Pacific Company	20	4604–4623	All built with dynamic brakes; 4622-4623 built with 567BC engines
Southern Pacific (Texas and New Orleans Railroad)	5	12–16	
Steelton and Highspire Railroad	1	26	
Tennessee Coal, Iron and Railroad Company	6	750–754, 770	
Texas and Pacific Railway	8	811–818	
Tremont and Gulf Railway	2	75, 77	to Illinois Central Railroad 800 and 801
Unity Railways	1	53	
United States Army	41	2000–2040	All 41 served in the Korean War, including the 2019 and 2022 now at the Heart of Dixie Railroad Museum. 2002 is on display at the National Museum of Transportation in Kirkwood, Missouri.
Total	310		

==== Locomotives built by General Motors Diesel, Canada ====
Railroad	Quantity	Road numbers	Notes
Algoma Central Railway	2	140–141	
Algoma Steel	1	50	
Canada and Gulf Terminal Railway	1	356	
Canadian National Railways	34	8500–8533	
Canadian Pacific Railway	10	6700–6709	
Dominion Foundries and Steel Company ("Dofasco")	2	11–12	
Dominion Iron and Steel	2	11–12	
Essex Terminal Railway	2	102, 104	Essex Terminal 104 last SW8 built 2/54
Steel Company of Canada	7	71–77	
Wabash Railroad	4	122–124, 127	Bought for use in Canada
Total	65		

=== TR6 ===
Railroad	Quantity A units	Quantity B units	Road numbers A units	Road numbers B units	Notes
Electro-Motive Division (demonstrator)	1	1	1600	1600B	to Southern Pacific 4600 (A), 4700 (B)
Oliver Iron Mining Company	8	8	1207A–1213A, 1216A	1207B–1213B, 1216B	
Southern Pacific Company	3	3	4601–4603	4701–4703	
Total	12	12			

== See also ==
- List of EMD locomotives
- List of GMD Locomotives
