= Calera, Alabama =

City in Alabama, United States

- City
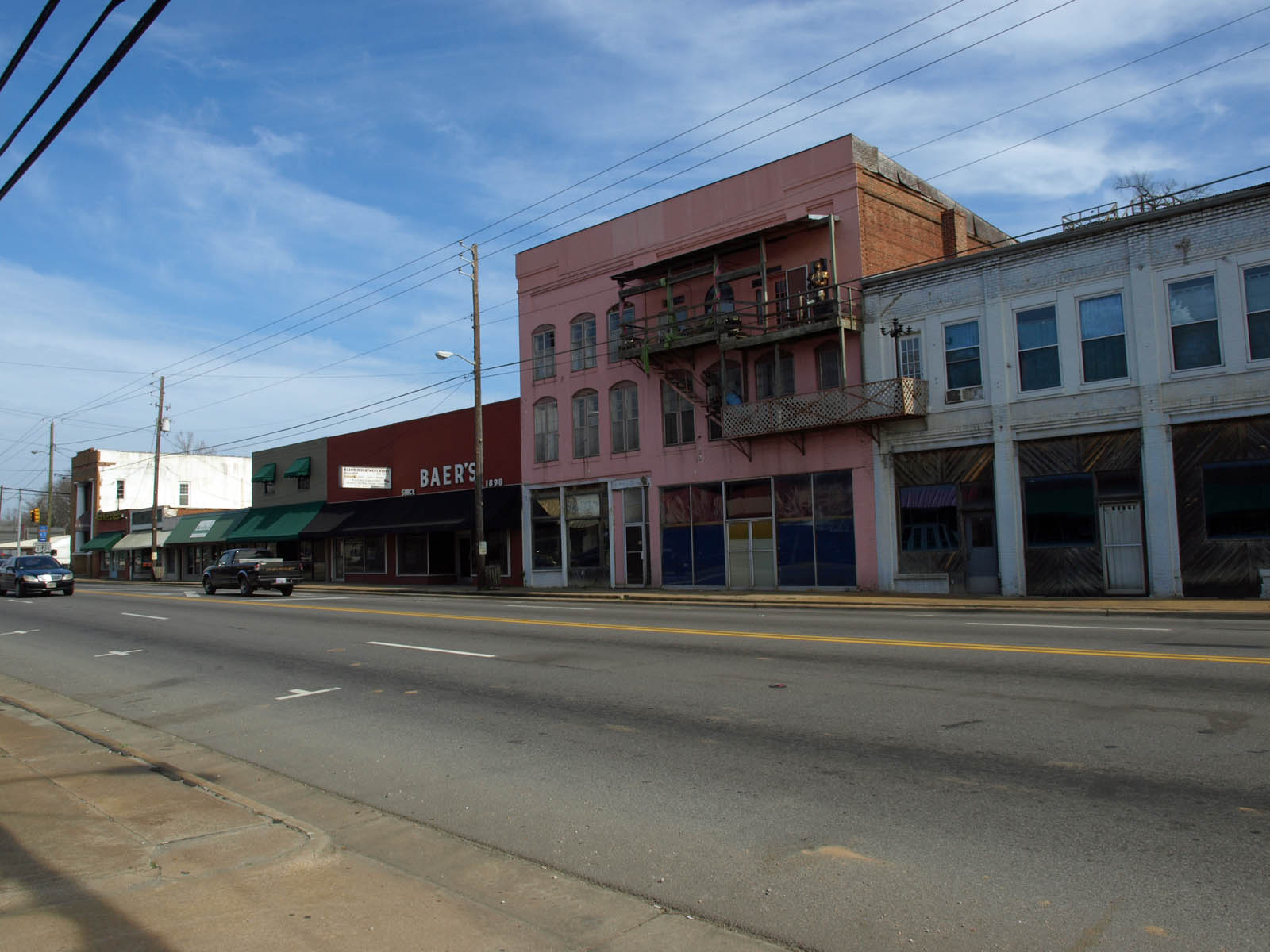
- Calera Downtown Historic District is listed on the National Register of Historic Places

- Seal

- Location of Calera in Chilton County and Shelby County, Alabama.
- Coordinates: 33°07′30″N 86°44′53″W
- Country: United States
- State: Alabama
- Counties: Chilton, Shelby

Government
  - Mayor: Kenny Dale Cost

Area
  - Total: 24.47 sq mi (63.38 km^{2})
  - Land: 24.21 sq mi (62.70 km^{2})
  - Water: 0.26 sq mi (0.68 km^{2})
- Elevation: 551 ft (168 m)

Population (2020)
  - Total: 16,494
  - Density: 681.3/sq mi (263.05/km^{2})
- Time zone: UTC-6 (CST)
  - Summer (DST): UTC-5 (CDT)
- ZIP code: 35040
- Area codes: 205, 659
- FIPS code: 01-11416
- GNIS feature ID: 2403965
- Website: www.cityofcalera.org

Calera is a city in Shelby and Chilton counties in the U.S. state of Alabama. It is the location of the Shelby County Airport.

As of the 2020 census, Calera had a population of 16,494.

It is within the Birmingham, Alabama, metropolitan area.

== History ==
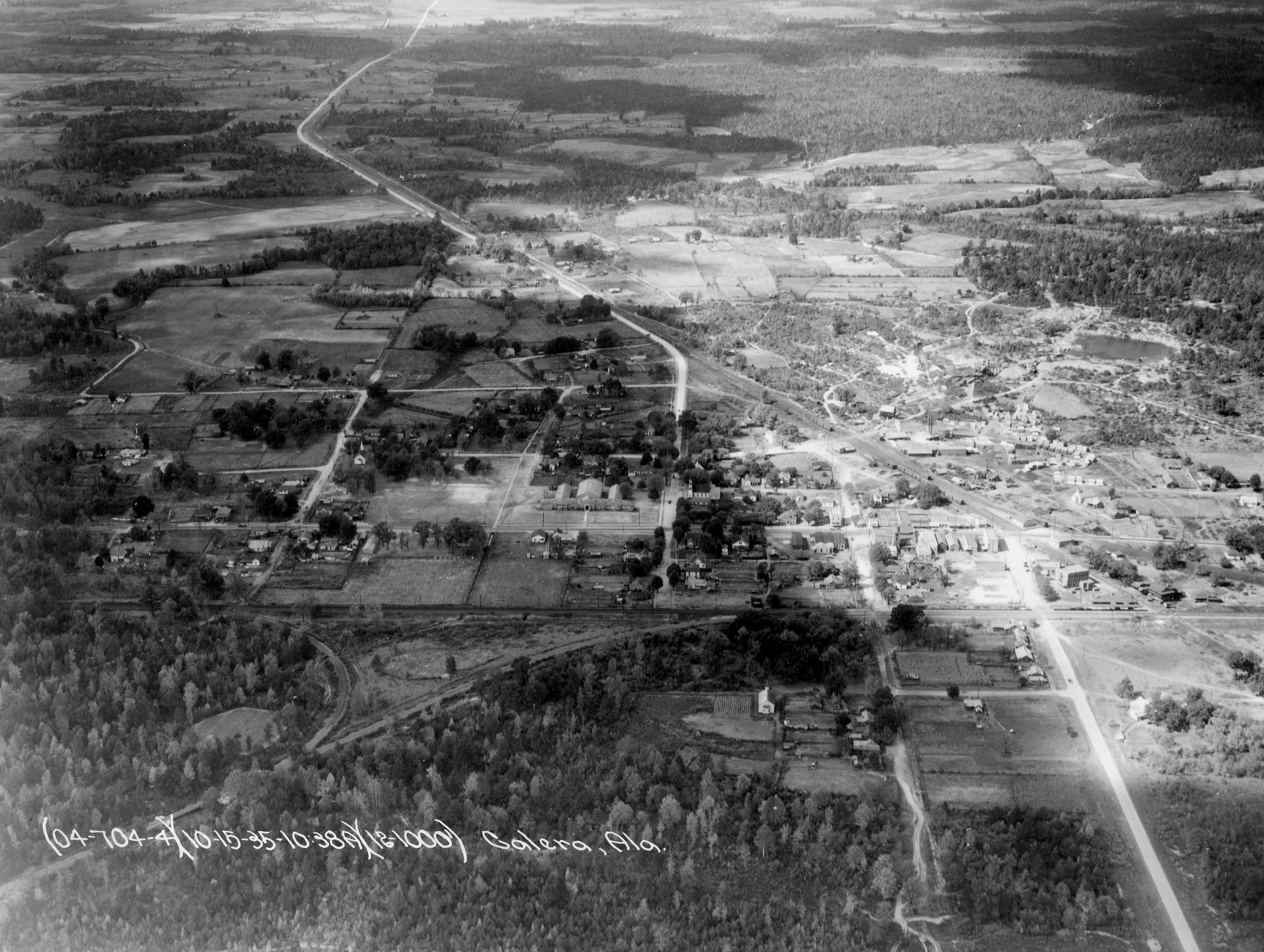
Calera in 1935

Calera was incorporated in 1887, and named after the Spanish word for "quarry" for all of the limestone deposits located in the area.

== Geography ==
Calera is located in southern Shelby County and the city limits extend southward into Chilton County along U.S. Route 31, the main highway through the city. Interstate 65 passes through the eastern side of the city, with access from exits 228, 231, and 234. Birmingham is 34 mi (55 km) north, and Montgomery is 59 mi (95 km) south, both via I-65.

According to the United States Census Bureau, the city has a total area of 24.4 square miles (63.1 km^{2}), of which 24.1 square miles (62.4 km^{2}) is land and 0.27 square miles (0.7 km^{2}), or 1.17%, is water.

=== Climate ===
The climate in this area is characterized by hot, humid summers and generally mild to cool winters. According to the Köppen Climate Classification system, Calera has a humid subtropical climate, abbreviated "Cfa" on climate maps. Calera is the location of the National Weather Service forecast office that serves the Birmingham metropolitan area.

Climate data for Calera, Alabama
Month	Jan	Feb	Mar	Apr	May	Jun	Jul	Aug	Sep	Oct	Nov	Dec	Year
Mean daily maximum °C (°F)	12 (54)	16 (60)	19 (67)	25 (77)	28 (83)	32 (89)	33 (92)	33 (91)	30 (86)	25 (77)	19 (66)	14 (58)	24 (75)
Mean daily minimum °C (°F)	−1 (31)	1 (33)	5 (41)	9 (48)	13 (55)	17 (63)	19 (67)	19 (66)	16 (61)	9 (48)	4 (39)	1 (33)	9 (49)
Average precipitation mm (inches)	130 (5.1)	130 (5.3)	170 (6.5)	130 (5.2)	100 (4)	110 (4.2)	140 (5.4)	110 (4.2)	97 (3.8)	71 (2.8)	94 (3.7)	130 (5.1)	1,400 (55.1)
Source: Weatherbase

== Demographics ==
Historical population
Census	Pop.	Note	%±
1880	234		—
1890	753		221.8%
1900	770		2.3%
1910	754		−2.1%
1920	852		13.0%
1930	975		14.4%
1940	1,092		12.0%
1950	1,361		24.6%
1960	1,928		41.7%
1970	1,655		−14.2%
1980	2,035		23.0%
1990	2,136		5.0%
2000	3,158		47.8%
2010	11,620		268.0%
2020	16,494		41.9%
2025 (est.)	18,992	▲	15.1%
U.S. Decennial Census

=== Racial and ethnic composition ===
Calera city, Alabama – Racial and ethnic composition Note: the US Census treats Hispanic/Latino as an ethnic category. This table excludes Latinos from the racial categories and assigns them to a separate category. Hispanics/Latinos may be of any race. Race and ethnicity were not surveyed for populations under 2,500 in 1980 and under 1,000 in 1990.
Race / Ethnicity (NH = Non-Hispanic)	Pop 1990	Pop 2000	Pop 2010	Pop 2020	% 1990	% 2000	% 2010	% 2020
White alone (NH)	1,795	2,417	8,094	9,264	84.04%	76.54%	69.66%	56.17%
Black or African American alone (NH)	310	620	2,651	5,205	14.51%	19.63%	22.81%	31.56%
Native American or Alaska Native alone (NH)	14	6	23	31	0.66%	0.19%	0.20%	0.19%
Asian alone (NH)	3	13	71	134	0.14%	0.41%	0.61%	0.81%
Native Hawaiian or Pacific Islander alone (NH)	x	2	3	3	x	0.06%	0.03%	0.02%
Other race alone (NH)	0	2	12	69	0.00%	0.06%	0.10%	0.42%
Mixed race or Multiracial (NH)	x	38	188	747	x	1.20%	1.62%	4.53%
Hispanic or Latino (any race)	14	60	578	1,041	0.66%	1.90%	4.97%	6.31%
Total	2,136	3,158	11,620	16,494	100.00%	100.00%	100.00%	100.00%

=== 2020 census ===
As of the 2020 census, Calera had a population of 16,494, 6,226 households, and 3,469 families. The median age was 33.4 years. 28.1% of residents were under the age of 18 and 9.1% of residents were 65 years of age or older. For every 100 females there were 87.9 males, and for every 100 females age 18 and over there were 81.7 males age 18 and over.

92.1% of residents lived in urban areas, while 7.9% lived in rural areas.

There were 6,226 households in Calera, of which 41.4% had children under the age of 18 living in them. Of all households, 49.0% were married-couple households, 14.0% were households with a male householder and no spouse or partner present, and 30.7% were households with a female householder and no spouse or partner present. About 23.7% of all households were made up of individuals and 6.9% had someone living alone who was 65 years of age or older.

There were 6,508 housing units, of which 4.3% were vacant. The homeowner vacancy rate was 1.3% and the rental vacancy rate was 5.3%.

=== 2010 census ===
As of the census of 2010, there were 11,620 people, 4,657 households, and 3,240 families living in the city. The population density was 482.2 inhabitants per square mile (186.2/km^{2}). There were 5,128 housing units at an average density of 212.8 per square mile (82.2/km^{2}). The racial makeup of the city was 71.2% White, 23.0% Black or African American, 0.2% Native American, 0.6% Asian, 0% Pacific Islander, 2.9% from other races, and 2.0% from two or more races. 5.0% of the population were Hispanic or Latino of any race.

Of the 4,657 households 35.4% had children under the age of 18 living with them, 53.8% were married couples living together, 12.3% had a female householder with no husband present, and 30.4% were non-families. 25.9% of households were one person and 5.2% were one person aged 65 or older. The average household size was 2.49 and the average family size was 3.01.

The age distribution was 26.5% under the age of 18, 7.4% from 18 to 24, 39.5% from 25 to 44, 18.5% from 45 to 64, and 8.0% 65 or older. The median age was 31.9 years. For every 100 females, there were 92.0 males. For every 100 females age 18 and over, there were 87.7 males.

The median household income was $54,080 and the median family income was $62,117. Males had a median income of $47,125 versus $37,888 for females. The per capita income for the city was $24,391. About 9.6% of families and 12.6% of the population were below the poverty line, including 18.9% of those under age 18 and 7.8% of those age 65 or over.

=== 2000 census ===
As of the census of 2000, there were 3,158 people, 1,248 households, and 888 families living in the city. The population density was 244.9 inhabitants per square mile (94.6/km^{2}). There were 1,400 housing units at an average density of 108.6 per square mile (41.9/km^{2}). The racial makeup of the city was 77.42% White, 19.92% Black or African American, 0.19% Native American, 0.54% Asian, 0.06% Pacific Islander, 0.66% from other races, and 1.20% from two or more races. 1.90% of the population were Hispanic or Latino of any race.

Of the 1,248 households 33.0% had children under the age of 18 living with them, 54.1% were married couples living together, 13.5% had a female householder with no husband present, and 28.8% were non-families. 26.4% of households were one person and 10.8% were one person aged 65 or older. The average household size was 2.51 and the average family size was 3.04.

The age distribution was 26.7% under the age of 18, 8.2% from 18 to 24, 31.7% from 25 to 44, 20.9% from 45 to 64, and 12.5% 65 or older. The median age was 34 years. For every 100 females, there were 93.0 males. For every 100 females age 18 and over, there were 85.0 males.

The median household income was $35,650 and the median family income was $42,885. Males had a median income of $34,042 versus $21,750 for females. The per capita income for the city was $16,395. About 12.2% of families and 12.5% of the population were below the poverty line, including 15.8% of those under age 18 and 3.2% of those age 65 or over.

== Arts and culture ==
Points of interest include:

- Shelby County Airport
- Heart of Dixie Railroad Museum
- George Roy Park
- Oliver Park
- Timberline Golf Course
- Calera Presbyterian Church
- Rules of entertainment

== Gallery ==
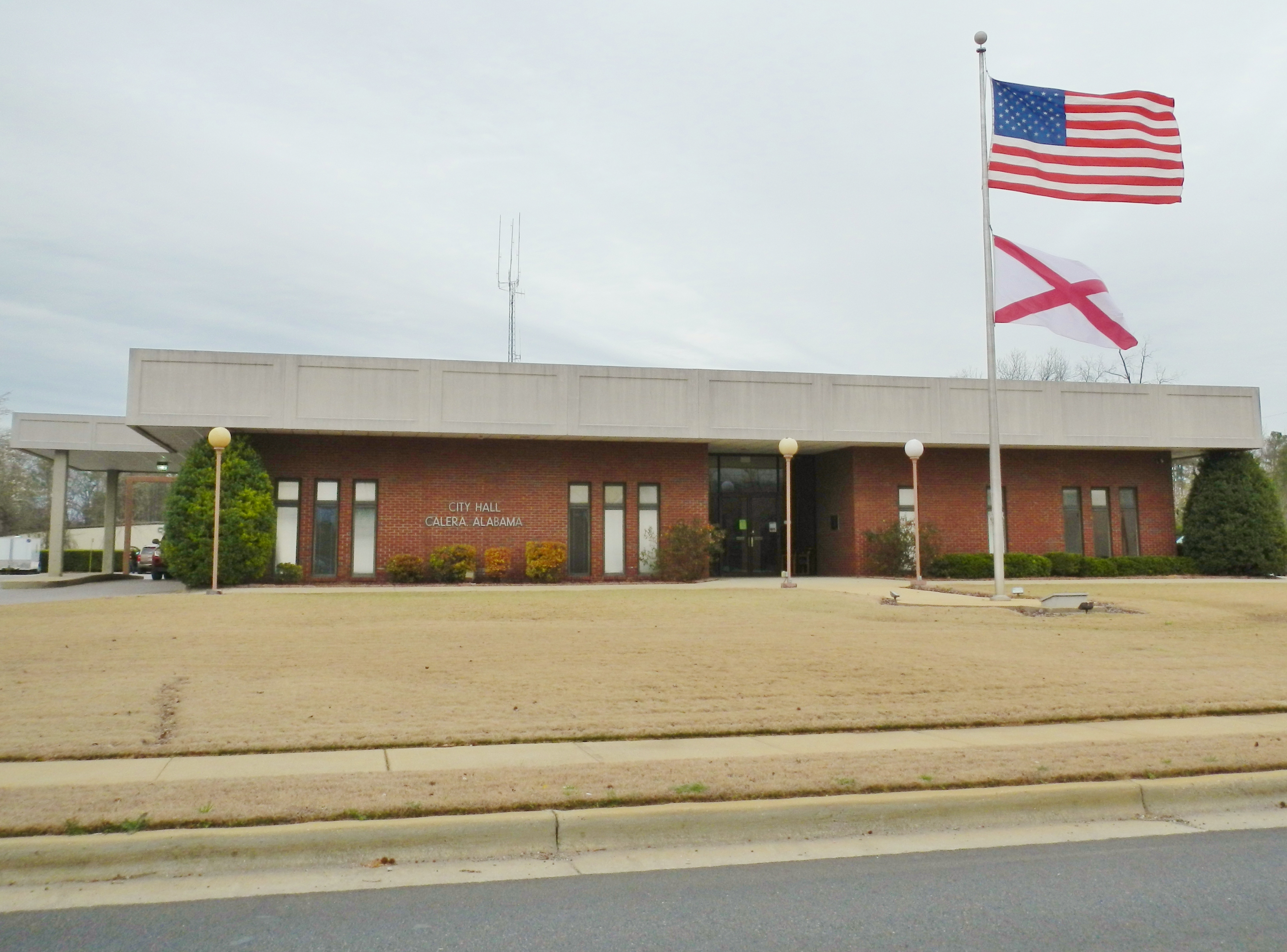
Calera City Hall

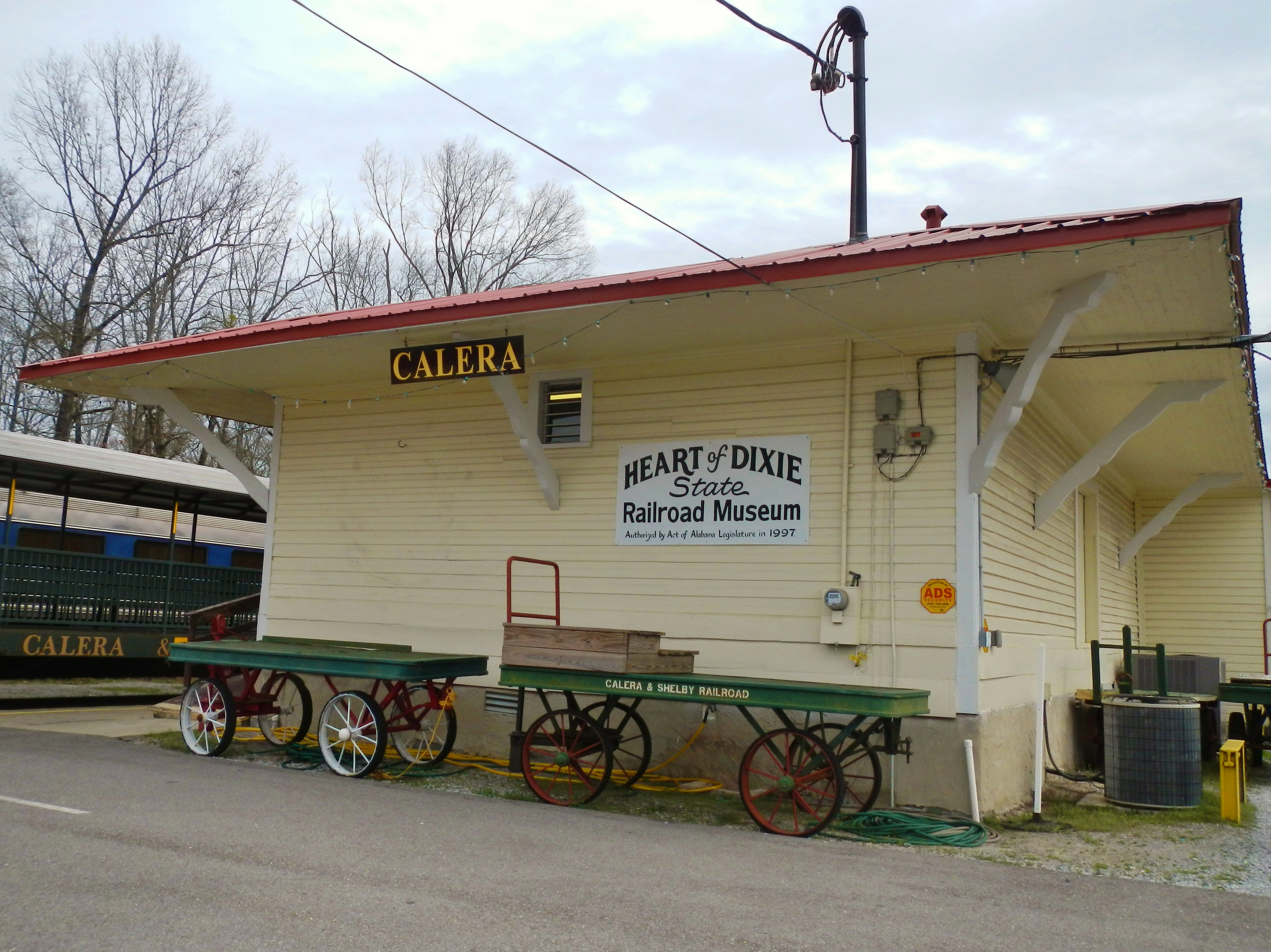
Heart of Dixie Railroad Museum

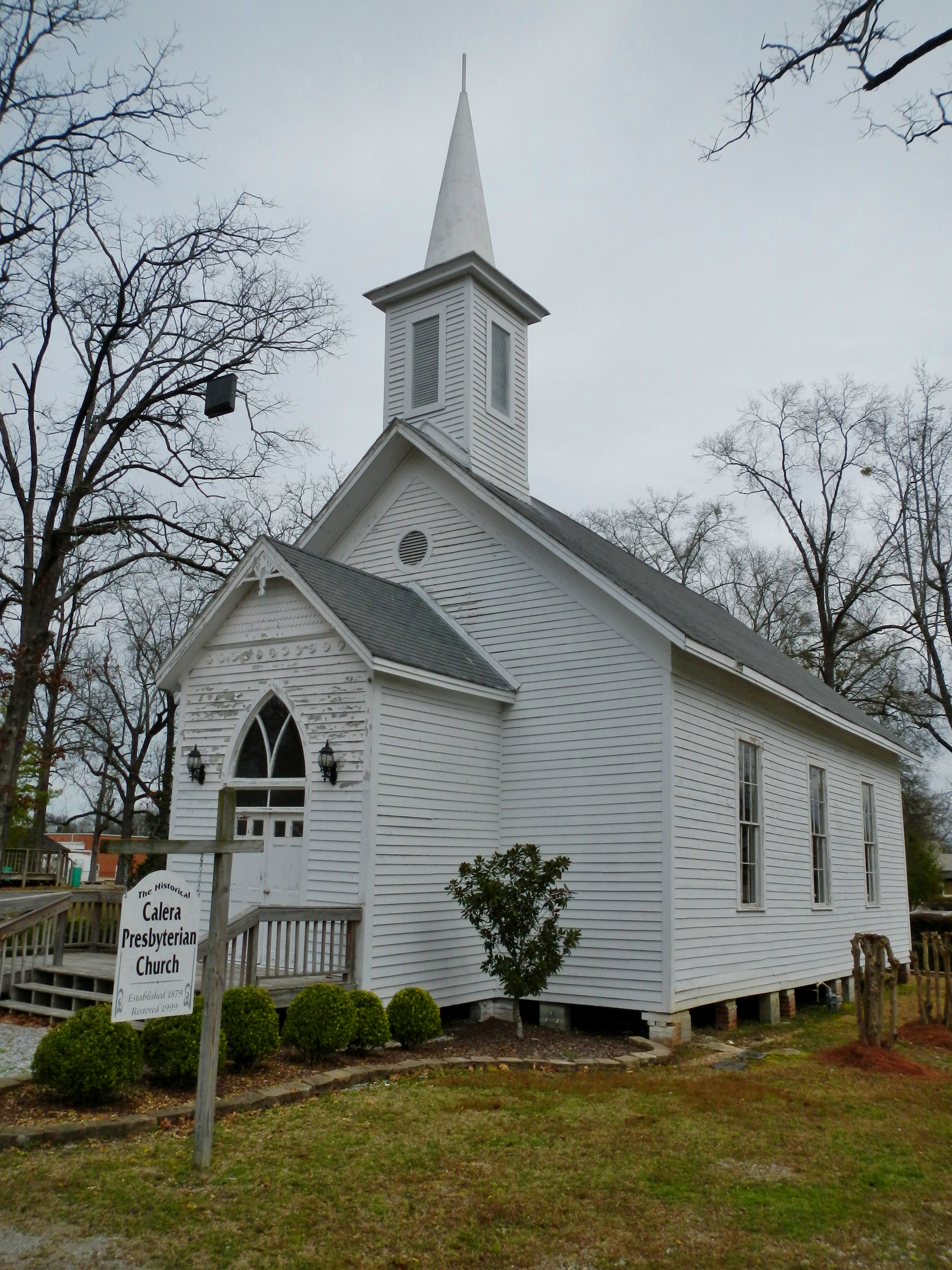
The Calera Presbyterian Church was built in 1885. The church building is now owned by the city. It was added to the Alabama Register of Landmarks and Heritage on March 12, 1997.

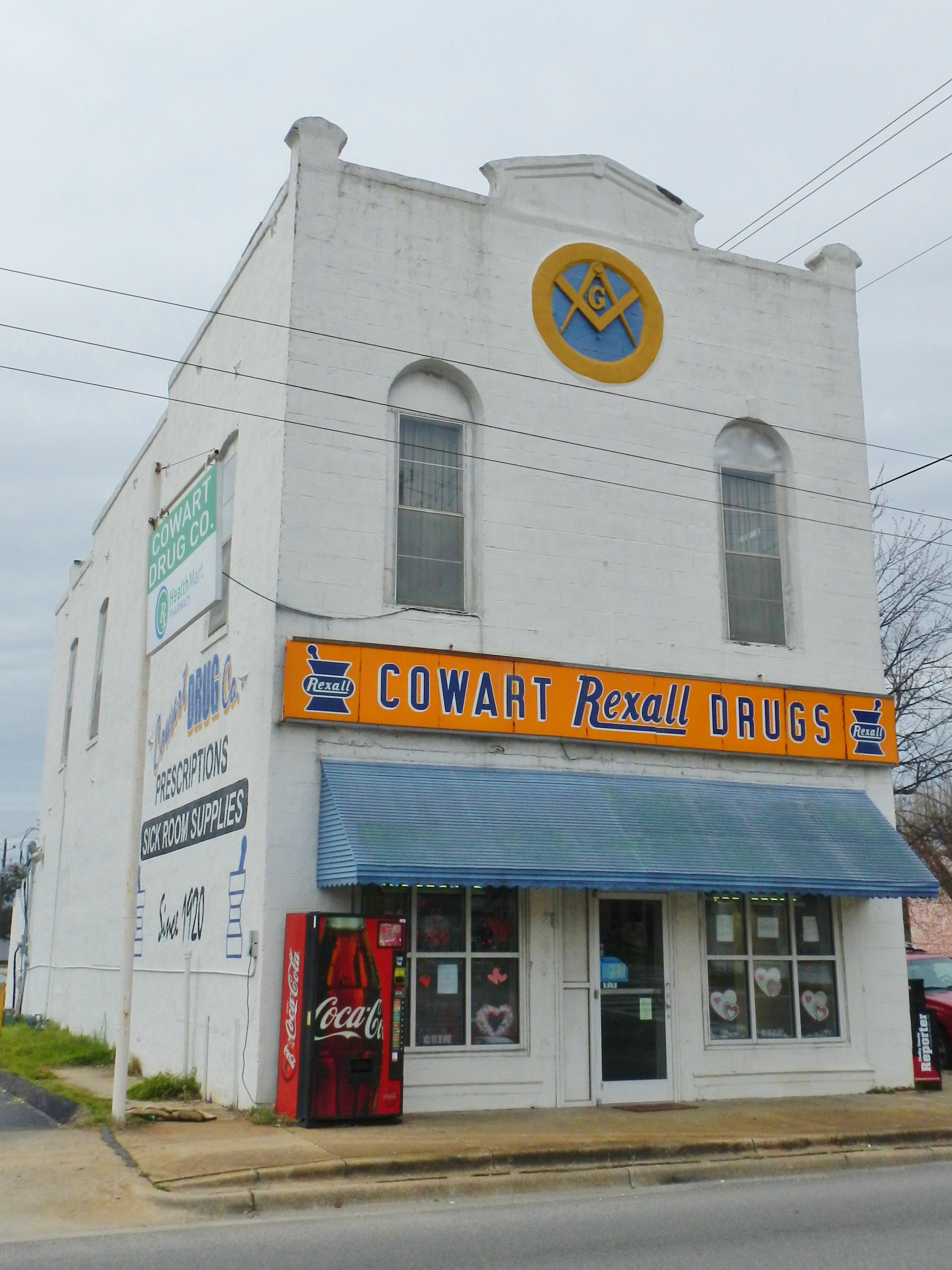
The Cowart Drug Store was built in 1885. It was added to the Alabama Register of Landmarks and Heritage on February 15, 1977.

== Infrastructure ==
Chilton County Transit provides dial-a-ride bus transit service to the city.

== Notable people ==
- Shanavia Dowdell, professional basketball player
- Hut Stricklin, NASCAR driver
- Virgil Trucks, Major League Baseball pitcher
