= James Brown (Chickasaw) =

Mississippi Native (d. 1839)

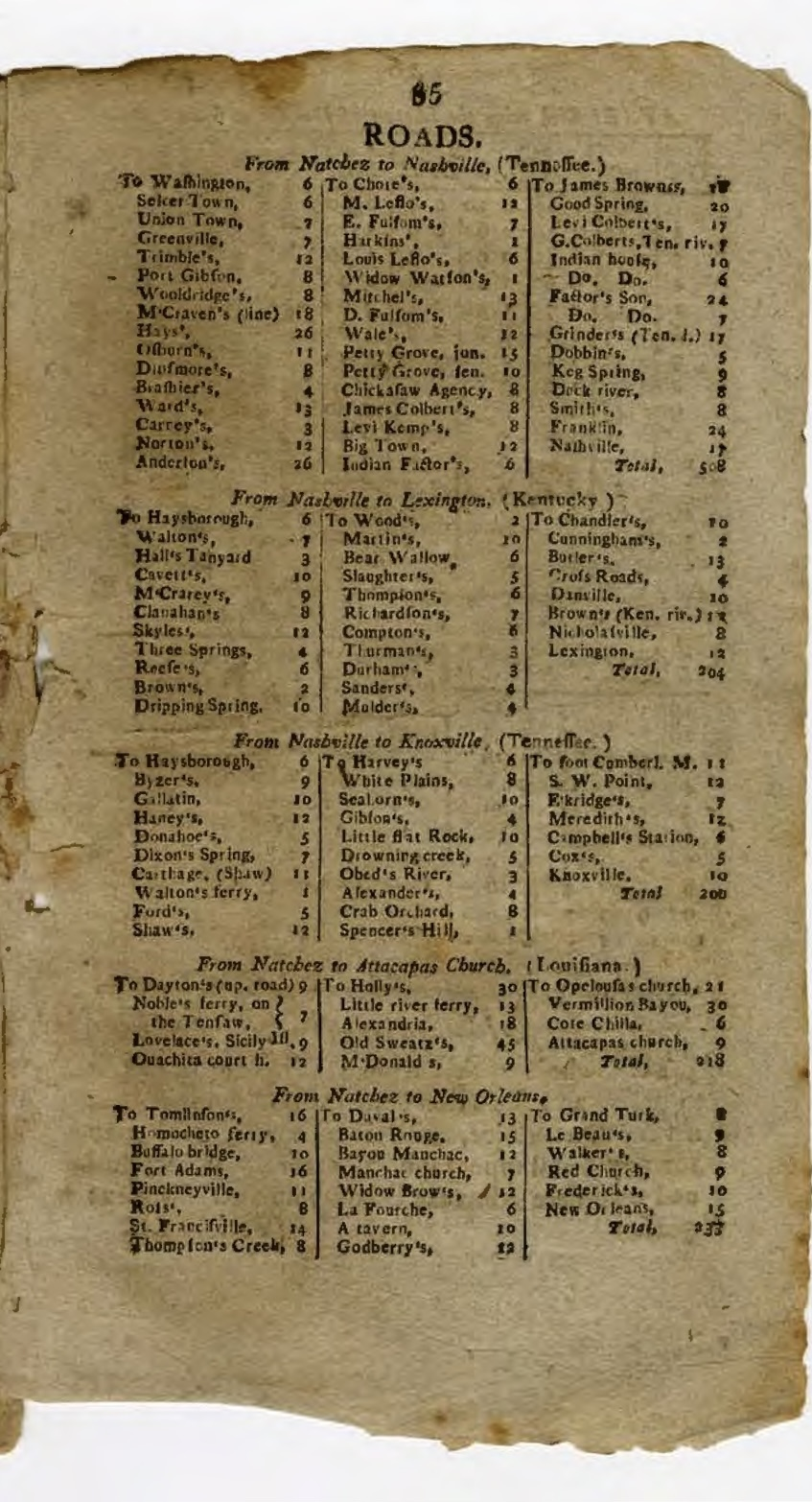
James Brown may have had a tavern along the Natchez Trace circa 1815 ("Roads" from Andrew Marschalk's Almanac of Louisiana and Mississippi)

James Brown (d. March 1839) was a leader of the Chickasaw Nation of North America in the late 18th and early 19th centuries.

== Delegation to George Washington ==
James Brown the Younger, along with William Colbert, and Coahoma (William McGillivray), was one member of a Chickasaw delegation that met with George Washington in 1795. According to one account, they were in Philadelphia seeking military aid from the United States in a defensive war against the Muscogee Confederation. According to an unidentified, elderly U.S. Army veteran, resident in Arkansas as of 1894—who had accompanied the Chickasaw on the Indian Removal migration to the Indian Territory—Brown's descendants had possession of document signed by Washington granting Brown rank as a captain in the U.S. Army.

== Creek War involvement and Brown as a signatory ==
Brown was one of a number of Chickasaw who fought with Andrew Jackson's troops against the Red Stick Creeks during the Creek War. Brown was a signatory to the 1816 Treaty with the Chickasaw negotiated with Andrew Jackson and others. Brown and Levi Colbert were the sellers of the tract that became the subject of the Salt Lick Reservation controversy. The terms of the 1830 Treaty of Franklin granted Brown a "two-section reservation."

== Legacy ==
According to Mississippi judge and local historian George Etheridge writing in 1939, "James Brown lived in the forks of a creek known as Jim Brown Creek and another known as Jincy Brown Creek, one being named for Jim Brown and the other for his wife Jincy Brown. Brown's Creek is in the eastern part of Prentiss county, and flows southwardly into the Tombigbee river. Brown was chief of or Captain in his district."

== Death ==
Brown died in a smallpox outbreak at Fort Coffee during Indian Removal in March 1839 and was buried there with honors.

== See also ==
- Tishomingo
