= Colbert (name) =

Colbert is an English and French surname and given name of uncertain etymology. It is possible that it appeared independently several times throughout history. The name is recorded in England in the 11th century Domesday Book in Devon, Cheshire, and Lincolnshire. This English surname was originally a given name that may have meant "cool" and "bright"; see also Bert.

The name is common in English-speaking countries, particularly Ireland, but some of these families may have their origin in France, where the name is very common.

The French name perhaps has a different origin, but some linguists say it has the same origin from the Germanic words kol ("cool") and berht ("bright"). It is recorded in the French province of Champagne in the 15th century, where, some suggest, it is a reduced form of "Colibert", which is also attested in medieval Champagne. "Colibert" was originally a contraction of the Latin collibertus ("fellow freedman", i.e. "fellow freed slave"). It may, however, derive from an unattested Germanic given name *Colberht, or a gallicized form of the Flemish surname Koelbert. This in turn derives from a given name mentioned as Colobert in the 7th century.

== List of people ==
=== Surname ===
==== A–E ====
- Adrian Colbert (born 1993), American football player
- Anthony Colbert (1934–2007), British illustrator and painter
- A. Benae Colbert (Born 1962), American maker: writer, minister, soapmaker, podcaster
- Benjamin Colbert (born 1961), British-based American academic
- Brad Colbert (born 1974), United States Marine and subject of Generation Kill
- Burwell Colbert (1783–c.1850), American slave of Thomas Jefferson who was held in high esteem by Jefferson as a "faithful servant" who was "absolutely excepted from the whip" and served as butler, personal valet, glazier, and painter at Monticello
- Charles Colbert, marquis de Croissy (1625–1696), French diplomat, brother of Jean-Baptiste Colbert
- Charlotte Colbert, Franco-British multi-media artist
- Chunk Colbert (died 1874), American Old West gunman
- Claudette Colbert (1903–1996), Oscar-winning French-American actress
- Cleveland Colbert (1906–1962), African American politician and activist
- Con Colbert (1896–1916), Irish rebel
- Craig Colbert (born 1965), American baseball player
- Danny Colbert (born 1950), American football player
- Darrell Colbert (born 1964), American football player
- Edwin H. Colbert (1905–2001), American vertebrate paleontologist
- Elizabeth Colbert Busch (born 1954), American politician

==== F–M ====
- George Colbert (c. 1764–1839), also known as Tootemastubbea, leader of the Chickasaw, soldier and a plantation owner in Mississippi
- Gregory Colbert (born 1960), Canadian photographer and filmmaker
- Holmes Colbert (fl. 1812–1850s), developer of the Chickasaw Nation's constitution in the 1850s
- J. Frank Colbert (1882–1949), Louisiana politician
- Jacques-Nicolas Colbert (1655–1707), French churchman, son of Jean-Baptiste Colbert
- James Colbert (1890–1970), Irish politician and farmer
- James William Colbert Jr. (1920–1974), American physician and father of Stephen Colbert
- Jean-Baptiste Colbert (1619–1683), an important Comptroller-General of Finances under the French king Louis XIV
- Jean-Baptiste Colbert, Marquis de Seignelay (1651–1690), called Seignelay, French politician, son of Jean-Baptiste Colbert
- Jean-Baptiste Colbert, Marquess of Torcy (1665–1746), French diplomat who negotiated important treaties
- Jim Colbert (born 1941), American golfer
- John Colbert (1946–2011), birth name of American singer J. Blackfoot
- Keary Colbert (born 1982), American football player
- Kevin Colbert (born 1957), American football general manager
- Lehmon Colbert (born 1988), American professional basketball player
- Leigh Colbert (born 1975), Australian rules footballer
- Leo Otis Colbert (1883–1968), American admiral, third Director of the United States Coast and Geodetic Survey Corps
- Levi Colbert (1759–1834), also known as Itawamba, leader and chief of the Chickasaw in the American Southeast
- Michael Colbert (1900–1959), Irish politician
- Michael B. Colbert, director of the Ohio Department of Job and Family Services

==== N–Z ====
- Nate Colbert (1946–2023), American baseball player
- Patrick Colbert (1842–1877), Irish soldier who served in the United States Navy during the American Civil War
- Pierre David de Colbert-Chabanais (1774–1853), Napoleonic French Baron and leader of the Red Lancers
- Philip Colbert, British artist and fashion designer
- Richard Colbert, American spammer
- Richard G. Colbert (1915–1973), four-star admiral, U.S. Navy
- Robert Colbert (born 1931), American television actor and star of The Time Tunnel
- Stephen Colbert (born 1964), American satirist and entertainer, host of The Colbert Report and The Late Show with Stephen Colbert
- Thomas J. Colbert (born 1957), American consultant, writer, producer and former media executive
- Tom Colbert (born 1949), American judge
- Vince Colbert (born 1945), American baseball player
- Will Colbert (born 1985), Canadian ice hockey player

=== Given name ===
- Colbert Clark (1898–1960), American screenwriter, film director and film producer
- Colbert Coldwell, American founder of Coldwell Banker real estate company
- Colbert I. King (born 1939), American journalist
- Colbert Marlot (born 1963), French professional footballer
- Colbert Searles (1873–1947), American football coach

=== Characters ===
- Stephen Colbert (character), fictionalized persona of political satirist Stephen Colbert
- Will Colbert (Friends character), character on Friends portrayed by Brad Pitt

== See also ==
- Colbert (disambiguation)
