= James Colbert (trader) =

British trader (c. 1720–1784)

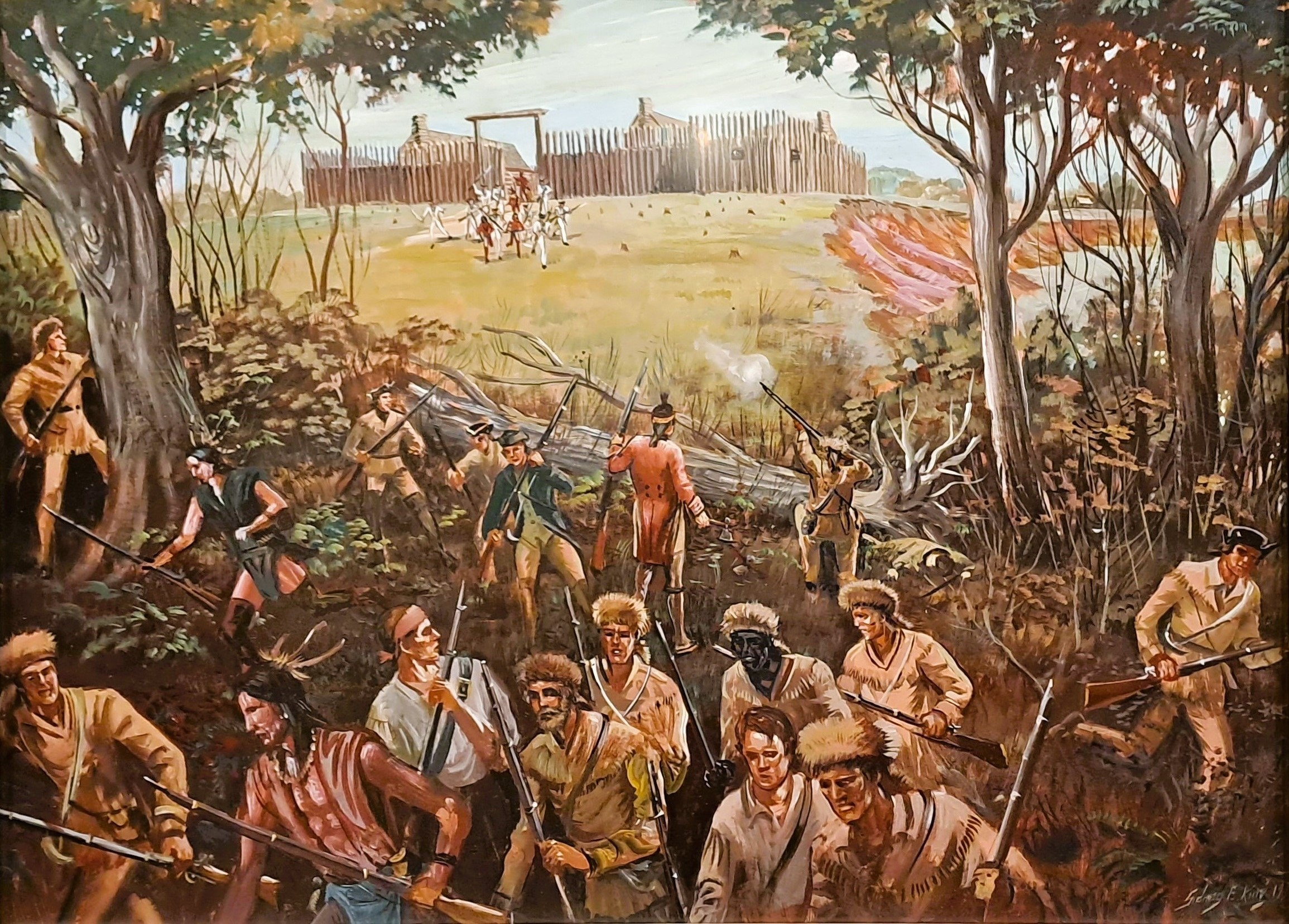
- Counterattack! by Sidney E. King shows Colbert (centre) at the battle of Arkansas Post.
- Born: c. 1720; Scotland
- Died: 7 January 1784 (aged 63–64); West Florida
- Occupations: Army officer; interpreter; trader
- Children: 8, including George and Levi
- Military service
- Allegiance: Great Britain
- Branch: British Army
- Rank: Captain
- Unit: 16th Regiment of Foot
- Battles: American Revolutionary War; Battle of Pensacola; Siege of Fort Jefferson (WIA); Colbert Raid

James Logan Colbert (c. 1720 – 7 January 1784) was a British trader who lived much of his life among the Chickasaw. He also served as an officer of the British Army who commanded an independent company in the Western Theater of the American Revolutionary War. In 1783, Colbert led an unsuccessful raid on the Franco-Spanish village of Arkansas Post, Louisiana (present-day U.S. state of Arkansas) in an attempt to capture Fort Carlos III.

== Early life and career ==
According to tradition, Colbert was born around 1720 in Scotland and settled in Georgia in January 1736 along with other Scots escaping the reprisals of the Jacobite Uprising.

He was married to three Chickasaw women: Nahettaly, Sophia, and Mary (all sisters) and among them had nine children; including George, Levi, and William, who became notable 19th-century tribal leaders. Fluent in Chickasaw, he served as an interpreter at the 1763 Augusta and the 1765 and 1771 Mobile Indian conferences. He fought with the British during the American Revolutionary War; most notably at Fort Jefferson, where he was wounded in action, and Arkansas Post. He died on 7 January 1784 in West Florida en route from St. Augustine, East Florida.
