= Treaty of Chickasaw Country =

1805 agreement ceding Chickasaw territory to the United States

Treaty with the Chickasaw, 1805
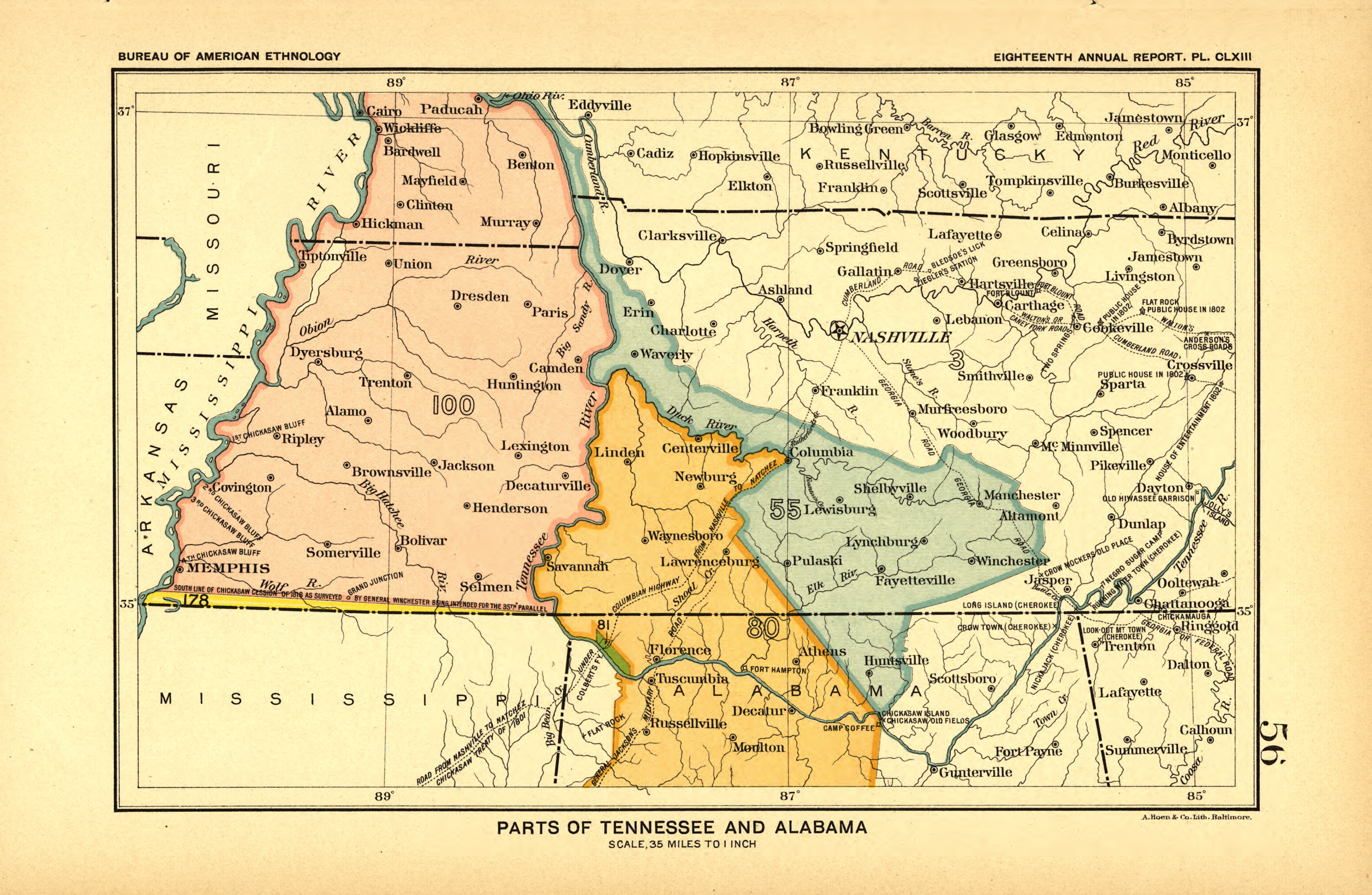
- Parts of Tennessee, Alabama, and Kentucky showing land ceded on July 23, 1805 in blue
- Signed: July 23, 1805
- Location: Chokkilissa' (present-day Lee County, Mississippi)
- Ratified: May 22, 1807
- Effective: May 23, 1807
- Parties: Chickasaw Nation United States
- Depositary: Government of the United States
- Languages: Chickasaw and English

The Treaty of Chickasaw Country (officially the Treaty with the Chickasaw, 1805) was a bilateral agreement between the tribal chiefs (Mingo) and warriors of Chickasaw Nation and the United States signed at Chokkilissa' in present-day Lee County, Mississippi, on July 23, 1805. It was the first major land cession by the Chickasaw and resulted in the cession of 2.25 million acres (9,100 km^{2}) of hunting land in exchange for the U.S. paying off $20,000 of Chickasaw trading debt.

The Chickasaw land cession encompassed parts of present-day Kentucky, central Tennessee, and northern Alabama, establishing the Natchez Trace as the boundary line between Chickasaw Country and the United States. Signatories included James Robertson, Silas Dinsmoor, Chenubbee Mingo, George Colbert, O'Koy, Tiphu Mashtubbee, Choomubbee, Mingo Mattaha, E. Mattaha Meko, William McGillivray, Tisshoo Hooluhta, and Levi Colbert. The treaty secretary was Thomas A. Claiborne, a brother of William C. C. Claiborne. A celebration ball was held on July 27, 1805, for the commissioners of the treaty and other dignitaries in the region that included former U.S. Vice President Aaron Burr. The treaty is numbered 55 in Charles C. Royce's Indian Land Cessions in the United States.

== See also ==
- List of the United States treaties § U.S.–Native American treaties
