= Coahoma =

Coahoma may refer to:

- William McGillivray (Chickasaw), tribal name Coahoma, namesake of Coahoma County, Mississippi
- Coahoma, Mississippi
- Coahoma, Texas
- Coahoma County
