= Fort Carlos III =

18th-century Spanish fort in North America

Fort Carlos III
- Écores Rouges, Luisiana (present-day Arkansas Post National Memorial)
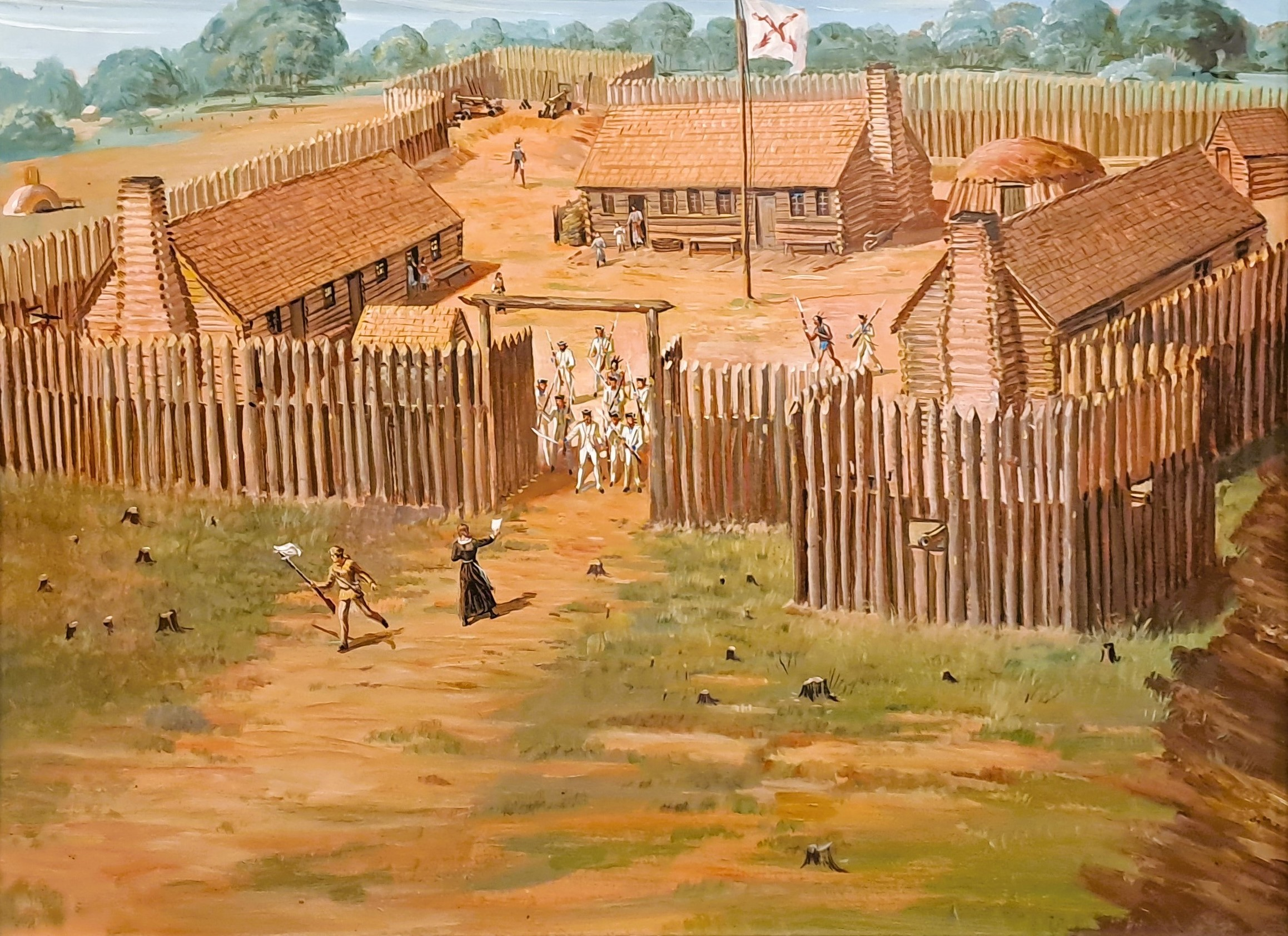
- No Surrender by Sidney E. King shows Captain Jacobo du Breuil refusing to accept the note carried by British hostage Dona de Villars and a partisan demanding surrender of the fort during Colbert's raid.

Location
- Location in North America
- Coordinates: 34°1′5.37″N 91°20′43.43″W
- Height: 13 ft 0 in (3.96 m)

Site history
- Built: July 11, 1781 (245 years ago)
- Built by: Spanish Army
- In use: July 11, 1781 – March 1, 1791
- Materials: Wood
- Fate: Destroyed by river bank erosion; bastions partially reconstructed at Arkansas Post National Memorial
- Battles/wars: American Revolutionary War; Colbert Raid

Garrison information
- Past commanders: Capt. Balthazer de Villiers (1781-82); Lieut. Don Luis de Villars (1782-83); Capt. Jacobo du Breuil (1783-90); Capt. Ignacio Delinó (1790-91)
- Garrison: Headquarters, District of Arkansas
- Occupants: Louisiana Fixed Infantry Regiment

Fort Carlos III was a Spanish fort located at the Écores Rouges, Luisiana, within the present-day Arkansas Post National Memorial. Named for King Carlos III, it was located on the left bank of the Arkansas, about 29 miles (47 km) from the mouth. This wooden palisade fort comprised a stockade, bastions, embrasures, storehouses, barracks, officers' quarters, a powder magazine, cannons, swivel guns, and ordnance stores. The fort served as the headquarters of Spain's district of Arkansas from 1781 until 1791 when it was destroyed by erosion and replaced by Fort San Esteban (later called Fort Madison).

== History ==
Fort Carlos III was completed on July 11, 1781, at the Écores Rouges, Luisiana. Discovery of the intention of British partisans to capture Arkansas Post earlier that month prompted its construction.

The post's commandant, Captain Balthazer de Villiers, described the stockade as consisting of:

...red oak stakes thirteen feet high, with diameters of 10 to 15 or 16 inches, split in two and reinforced inside by similar stakes to a height of six feet and a banquette of two feet.

Captain de Villiers also wrote that the stockade enclosed all

necessary places, including a house 45 feet long and 15 feet wide, and a storehouse, both serving to lodge my troops, and around several smaller buildings.

In addition, the fort consisted of two gates on opposite sides and two bastions at opposite angles of the fort, each mounted with 3 1/2-inch brass cannons. Embrasures in the stockade, which were covered with bullet-proof sliding panels, were made for the cannons and swivel guns.

Lieutenant Don Luis de Villars became acting commander at the post in April 1782 after Captain de Villiers became too ill to perform his duties. Captain Jacobo du Breuil took over as commander of the post on January 5, 1783, and added a bastion at one angle of the fort. Captain De Villier remained at the fort as second-in-command, despite orders from Governor Esteban Miró to leave.

Fort Carlos III was the focus of James Colbert's 1783 raid during the American Revolutionary War, during which it was a place of refuge for the local women and children. During the late 1780s and early 1790s, the side of the fort closest to the river was slowly destroyed by erosion and flooding. After Captain Ignacio Delinó took control of the post in 1790, he had Fort San Estevan built about a half mile back from the river to replace the ruined structure. By February 1793, Fort Carlos III was entirely eroded into the river. Today, the remains of the fort are inundated beneath Horseshoe Lake (Post Bend), a former channel of the river now used as a navigation lake.
