= Colbert =

Colbert may refer to:

== People ==
- Colbert (name), list of people with the name "Colbert". It most often refers to:
  - Claudette Colbert (1903–1996), Oscar-winning French-American actress
  - Jean-Baptiste Colbert (1619–1683), a Controller-General of Finances under the French king Louis XIV
  - Stephen Colbert (b. 1964), an American satirist and host of The Late Show with Stephen Colbert

== Places ==
- Colbert County, Alabama, United States
- Colbert, Georgia, United States
- Colbert, Oklahoma, United States
- Colbert, Washington, United States
- Colbert's Ferry, a historic Red River crossing on the National Register of Historic Places, United States
- Colbert Mountains, located on Alexander Island, Antarctica
- Mount Colbert, an Antarctic mountain in the Ross Dependency
- Colbert Hills, a golf course in Manhattan, Kansas, United States
- Colbert Hills (Antarctica), a line of hills in Antarctica

== Ships ==
- French ship Colbert, six ships of the French Navy named in honour of Jean-Baptiste Colbert
- Colbert-class ironclad, a class of warship used in the French Navy
- USS Colbert (APA-145), United States Navy attack transport

== Other ==
- Comité Colbert, French social committee
- Combined Operational Load Bearing External Resistance Treadmill (C.O.L.B.E.R.T.), an International Space Station exercise device named for Stephen Colbert
- Limerick Colbert railway station, Ireland, renamed Colbert Station in 1966 for Conn Colbert

== See also ==
- Kolbert
