= Paucaunla, Oklahoma =

Ghost town in Oklahoma, US

Paucaunla
- Ghost town
- Location in Oklahoma south of Durant and east of Colbert
- Coordinates: 33.853°N 96.414°W
- Country: United States
- State: Oklahoma
- County: Bryan
- Time zone: UTC-6 (Central (CST))
  - Summer (DST): UTC-5 (CDT)

Paucaunla is a ghost town in Bryan County, Oklahoma. It is six miles east of Colbert, Oklahoma. A post office operated in Paucaunla from September 23, 1897 to July 15, 1910. The community was located in Chickasaw Nation. The name of the town may have been taken from the Choctaw word pakqli, which means "to flower," or the Chickasaw Pak-an-li, which means "blossom."
