= Treaty of Pontotoc Creek =

1832 treaty between the United States and Chickasaw

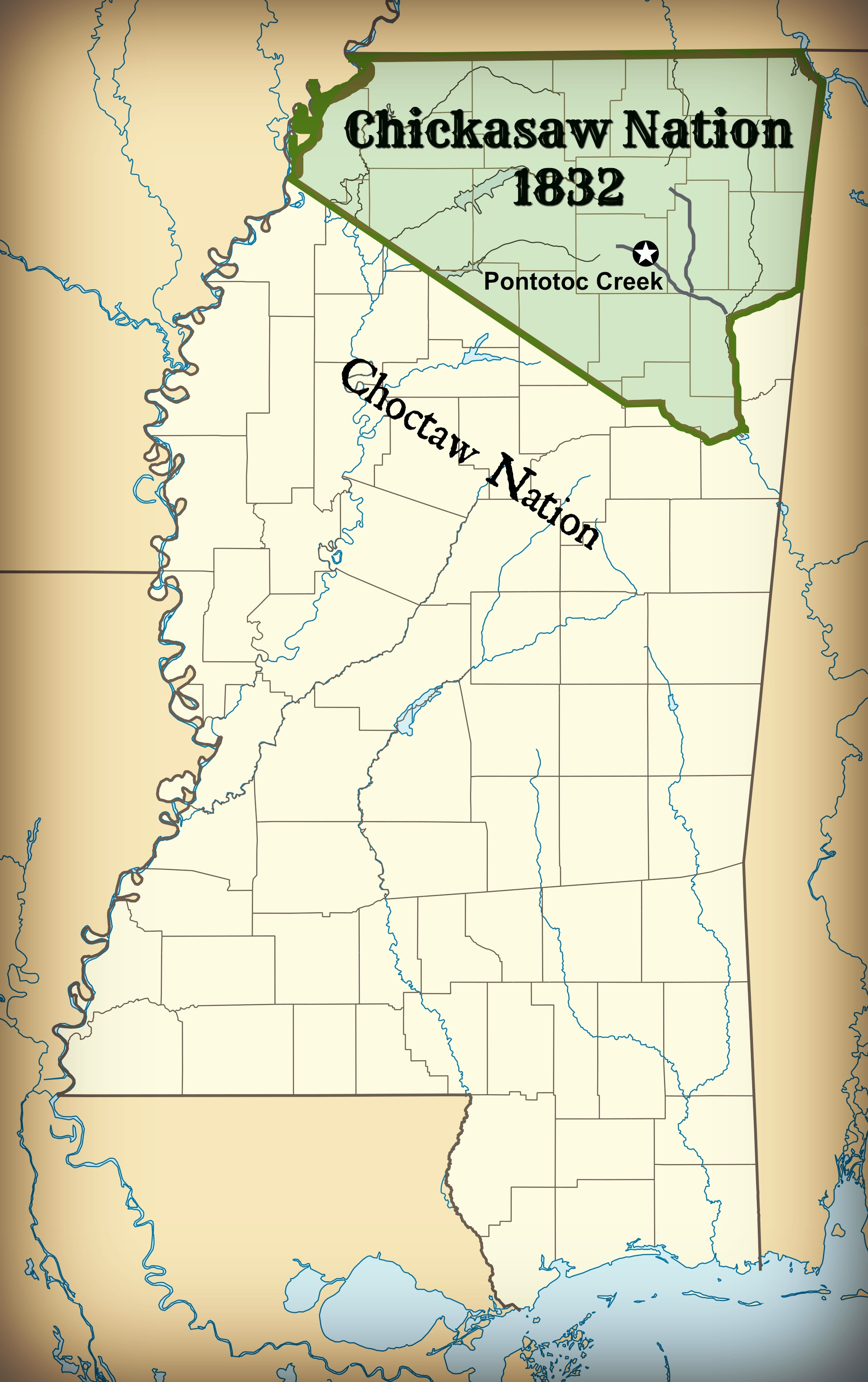
Chickasaw Nation Territory in 1832. The remaining Mississippi lands ceded in the Treaty of Pontotoc Creek.

The Treaty of Pontotoc Creek was a treaty signed on October 20, 1832 by representatives of the United States and the Minkos (Leaders) of the Chickasaw Nation assembled at the National Council House on Pontotoc Creek in Pontotoc, Mississippi. The treaty ceded the 6,283,804 acres of the remaining Chickasaw homeland in Mississippi in return for Chickasaw relocation to an equal amount of land west of the Mississippi River.

The treaty was preceded by an earlier agreement known as the Franklin Treaty or Treaty with the Chickasaw, 1830, which stipulated that the Chickasaw Nation would cede their lands in present-day Mississippi if tribal leaders found suitable lands west of the Mississippi River. The delegation sent to Indian Territory was unsuccessful, and the Franklin Treaty was never ratified by the United States. During this period, the United States federal government failed to uphold treaty obligations to remove non-Native intruders and allowed the state of Mississippi to pass legislation that infringed on Chickasaw sovereignty. Because of this pressure to remove, Chickasaw Minkos relented in 1832 to President Andrew Jackson's and his representatives' demand of relocation to the west. The remaining Chickasaw Homeland was ceded to the U.S. with the understanding that the proceeds made in the sale of the land to white settlers would go to the Chickasaw. The treaty led to the Chickasaw Removal, by which the entire Chickasaw Nation emigrated to new territory in present-day Oklahoma in 1837-1847.

== Background ==
The treaty was part of the greater Indian Removal policy, originally proposed by President Thomas Jefferson, by which the Five Civilized Tribes were to cede their historic homelands and relocate to the lands west of the Mississippi River. It was one of several removal treaties signed by the Muscogee, Choctaw, Chickasaw, and Cherokee Nations in the 1830s that relocated them to the new territories in present-day Oklahoma and Arkansas. Representatives of the U.S. federal government, including George Washington, had always been interested in removing the Five Tribes from the South to allow for White settlement, and Jefferson verbalized this plan in 1806. The other factor underlying the removal of the Indians was land speculation, one of the primary sources of money for the landed aristocracy of the South since the early days of the Virginia colony. The trio of Andrew Jackson, John Coffee and James Jackson (unrelated), were each land speculators, militiamen and politicians who worked towards the cession of huge tracts of Native lands, the defeat of Native resistance and eventually the complete removal of the Chickasaw, as well as the rest of the Five Tribes, to make way for white settlers–often at great personal profit.

=== First attempts at removal: Treaties of 1805, 1816 and 1818 ===
A series of land cessions preceded this final cession of Chickasaw land at Pontotoc Creek. The Chickasaws made two significant cessions in 1805 and 1816, ceding their land in Alabama and Tennessee along the Tennessee River, the highly valued land along the Muscle Shoals rapids of the river. The cessions had made a great profit to Jackson, Coffee and James Jackson, the latter of whom built his magnificent Forks of Cypress Plantation on the ceded land in Florence, Alabama. In 1818 Jackson began his attempt to totally remove the Chickasaw in a treaty that ceded everything between the Tennessee River and the Mississippi. John C. Calhoun, President Monroe's Secretary of War, had told Jackson that "The President is very anxious to remove the Indians on this side to the west of the Mississippi, and if the Chickasaws could be brought to an exchange of territory, it would be preferred." This land was very valuable on account of its fertile land and salt licks, and the Chickasaw were aware of this value. Jackson persuaded James Colbert and other Chickasaw chiefs to meet him at the Chickasaw Old Town (now Tupelo, Mississippi) to talk about the proposed cession. The Chickasaw were greatly influenced by the powerful chiefs James, George and Levi Colbert, landholding Chickasaw who had adopted some of the trappings of plantation society like owning slaves, and who supported removal to the west. With great difficulty, Jackson finally got the Chickasaw chiefs to give in with the promise of $20,000 paid annually to the chiefs for fifteen years. A deed was drawn up in the name of James Jackson, revealing the corrupt nature of these cessions later pointed out by Andrew Jackson's adversaries, and the Chickasaw lost everything north of the Mississippi border with Tennessee. Andrew Jackson achieved a massive land cession but not the total western removal that was wanted. The Chickasaw carefully guarded their remaining land until Jackson became President.

== Treaty of Pontotoc Creek, 1832 ==
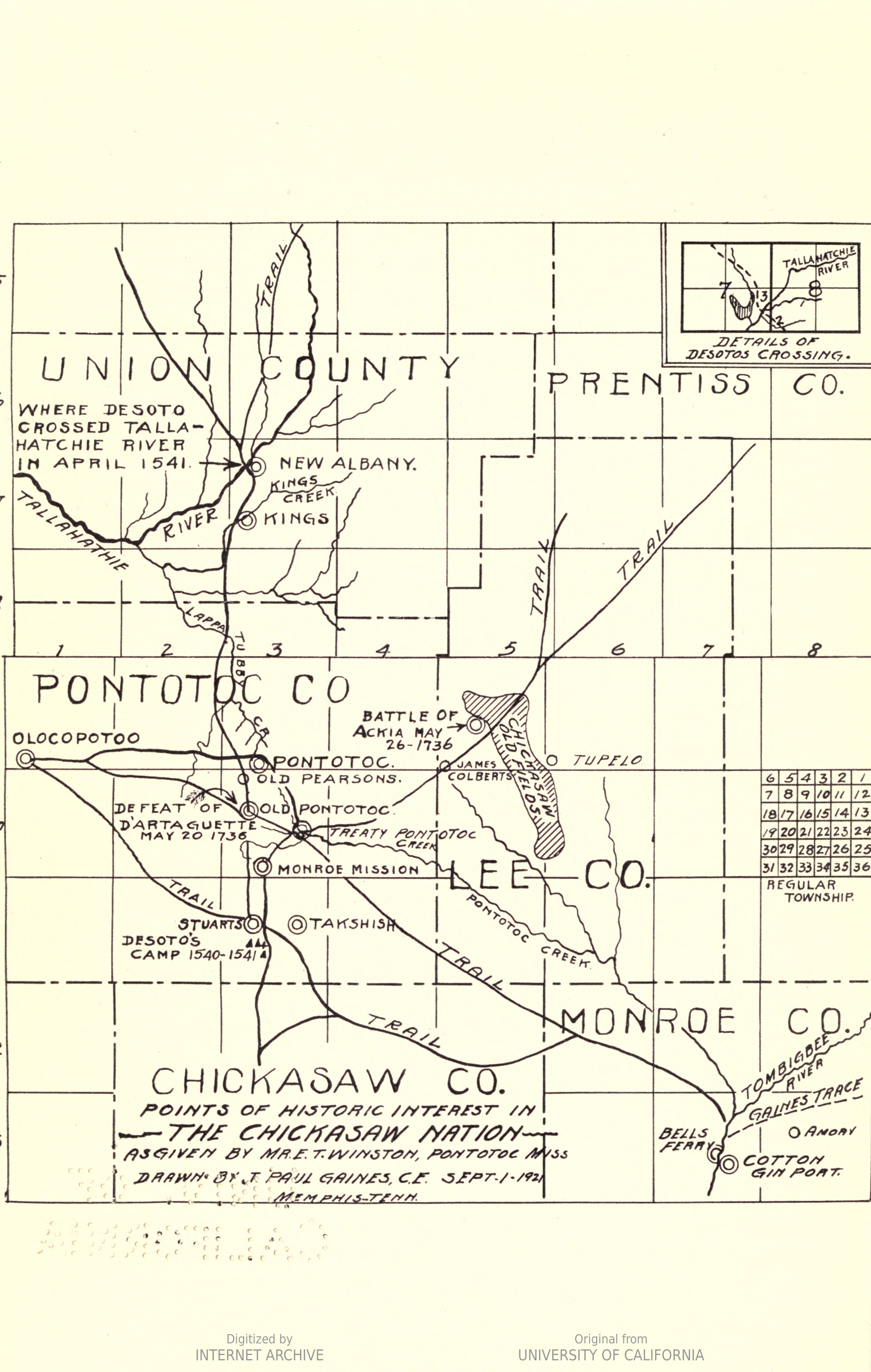
Points of historic interest in the Chickasaw Nation, Mississippi (drawn 1922)

After Jackson was elected President in 1828 he resolved to finish the drawn-out question of removal for good. The Indian Removal Act was passed in May, 1830, giving the President direct authority to negotiate the removal treaties for the Five Civilized Tribes still clinging to their southeastern homelands.

=== Treaty of Franklin, 1830 ===
After the act, Jackson received strong legal and judicial resistance from the more law-savvy Creeks and Cherokees, and the Choctaw Chief Greenwood LeFlore furiously refused any meeting with the president. However, the Chickasaw agreed to meet him in Franklin, Tennessee in the summer of 1830. By this point, the State of Mississippi had taken the same measures in dealing with the Chickasaw and Choctaw Nations as Georgia had with the Cherokee: unconstitutionally forbidding any exercise of tribal governance and extending state law over the Chickasaw Nation's borders. The Chickasaw came to Franklin to appeal to Jackson for Federal protection from Mississippi. Jackson, however, successfully talked the chiefs into removal after suggesting that by remaining in Mississippi, the Chickasaw would become subject to Mississippi law and their culture would eventually be extinguished by the incursion of white settlers. He said: "By becoming amalgamated with the whites, your national character will be lost... you must disappear and be forgotten." On August 27, 1830, after four days of deliberation, the Chickasaw chiefs agreed to send a delegation to examine land west of the Mississippi River. If the land they found was suitable and comparable to their historic homeland, then they would cede their land in Mississippi and relocate to the west.

=== Renegotiation and Pontotoc Creek ===
A Chickasaw delegation assigned to explore the new Chickasaw territory west of the Mississippi stalled removal, much to Jackson's distress, for another two years. They returned to the Chickasaw and said that the new land was unacceptable for their people. The Senate refused to ratify the Franklin treaty and the Chickasaw refused to leave their territory in Mississippi. For two additional years, the Chickasaws remained in Mississippi. Increasingly, however, the resolve of the Chickasaw people began to wane due to increasing numbers of non-Chickasaw squatters on Chickasaw lands and the passage of Mississippi state laws which challenged Chickasaw self-governance. In 1832, the Chickasaw National Council agreed to meet with John Coffee to negotiate a land transfer treaty. On October 20, 1832, during a meeting at the Council House on Pontotoc Creek, Chickasaw leaders signed a treaty allowing for the sale of Chickasaw lands within the state of Mississippi, in exchange for the surveying of new lands in the west.

The preamble written by the Chickasaw mincos read:

The Chickasaw Nation find themselves oppressed in their present situation, by being made subject to the laws of the States in which they reside. Being ignorant of the laws of the white man, they cannot understand or obey them. Rather than submit to this great evil, they prefer to seek a home in the west, where they may live and be governed by their own laws. And believing that they can procure for themselves a home, in a country suited to their wants and condition, provided they had the means to contract and pay for the same, they have determined to sell their country and hunt a new home. The President has heard the complaints of the Chickasaws and like them believes they cannot be happy, and prosper as a nation, in their present situation and condition, and being desirous to relieve them from the great calamity that seems to await them, if they remain as they are - He has sent his Commissioner General John Coffee, who has met the whole Chickasaw nation in Council, and after mature deliberation, they have entered into the following articles...

Although further complications had to be resolved, Arrell M. Gibson writes that the Pontotoc Creek Treaty "was the basic Chickasaw removal document providing for the cession of all tribal land east of the Mississippi River." In the treaty, the Chickasaw land was ceded in return for the U.S. finding suitable land for resettlement–illustrating the mincos' assertion of Chickasaw sovereignty despite attempts to extinguish it. Chickasaw landholders were to be compensated for the improvements made on their lands, and all the proceeds made by the Federal government in the sale of the land were to be turned over to the Chickasaw to pay for finding new territory and the actual removal of the tribe. Unlike in other removal treaties, the Chickasaw would pay for their own migration. The treaty also provided for protection the Chickasaw in Mississippi until they emigrated with the allotment of "temporary homesteads." This meant that the Chickasaws were allotted the land they were living on in Mississippi, to be protected by the Federal government from squatters; this benefit was not given to the Cherokee when later the Federal government relied on the influx of squatters in Georgia to pressure the Cherokee into removal.

== Aftermath ==
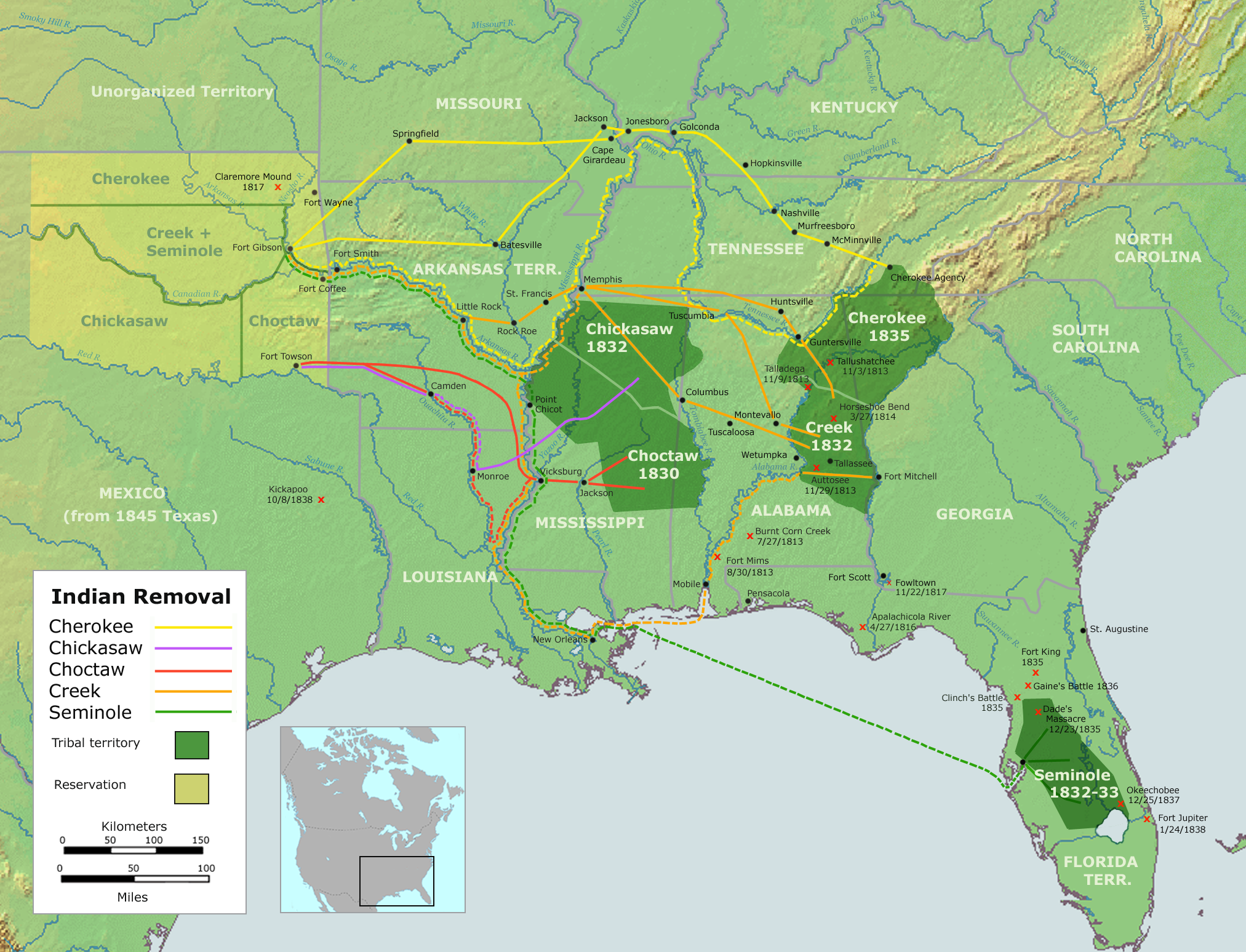
Map showing the 1832 Chickasaw land cession of their territory in northern Mississippi and the land in Indian Territory acquired in the Treaty of Doaksville.

Immediately following the treaty, unallotted Chickasaw land was quickly occupied by white settlers, although they were not supposed to enter, under the treaty, until the Chickasaw relocated.

Between 1832 and 1837, the Chickasaw made several further negotiations, in part because of the reluctance of the Senate to confirm Pontotoc and in part because of the Chickasaws' dissatisfaction with finding new land. The Treaty of Washington in 1834 confirmed Pontotoc. In addition it allowed for the enlargement of the Chickasaw temporary homesteads to be sold, and guaranteed the right of the Chickasaw to receive the revenue for each improved homestead sold. The chiefs were concerned to make the best deal in terms of sale and of acquiring new land for the Chickasaw people.

=== Land in the West, Treaty of Doaksville 1837 ===
After Pontotoc, the Chickasaw Nation sent delegations to search for new land in the Arkansas Territory, and they reached an agreement with the Choctaw in 1837. While the Chickasaw representatives initially wanted to purchase a portion of land in the Choctaw Nation, the Choctaw were unwilling to sell their new territory. Instead, the Chickasaws agreed to live amongst the Choctaw Nation in the Chickasaw District, where they would have representation in the Choctaw government. They would pay the Choctaws $530,000 for this privilege, and the treaty would be known as the Treaty of Doaksville, 1837. Although the treaty was really between the two Native nations, Andrew Jackson persuaded the U.S. Senate to ratify the treaty. Essentially, the Chickasaw had ceded their eastern land with the Treaty of Pontotoc Creek and acquired western land from the Choctaw in the Treaty of Doaksville.

== Result: Chickasaw Removal ==
Starting in 1837, 4,914 Chickasaws and their 1,156 enslaved people emigrated to the new Chickasaw District in the western portion of the Choctaw Nation. They received over $3 million from the sales of the Mississippi allotments, but this wealth incurred further external threats from white opportunists coming to the new Chickasaw territory as surveyors and salesmen. Several Indian Agents and businesses contracted to provide rations and other goods to Chickasaws in their new territory actively worked to defraud them of their money. Chickasaw Removal was the least traumatic of the removal journeys of any of the Five Civilized Tribes. It was achieved with relative success compared to the Choctaw or Cherokee, yet it still had damaging effects on tribal culture and structure which took decades to heal.
