= William Colbert (Chickasaw) =

Tribal leader (c. 1750–1824)

William Colbert (born 1742 to 1750 – May 30, 1824), native name Chooshemataha, was the oldest son of North American trader James Colbert by his first wife, a Chickasaw woman. Along with several of his brothers, William Colbert was important leader of the Chickasaw people in the 18th and 19th centuries. The Chickasaw were aligned with the British during the American Revolutionary War, and William joined his father in capturing Spanish ships on the Mississippi and the Battle of Arkansas Post in 1783. In 1791, under command of Arthur St. Clair in Ohio, William, his brother George Colbert, and Piomingo fought other Indigenous people for which they were awarded medals by George Washington. William Colbert also led attacks on Osage people across the Mississippi River, which frustrated U.S. Indian Agent Samuel Mitchell because it led to retaliatory attacks on non-Chicksaws.

On February 14, 1804, Andrew Jackson, U.S. District Court Judge John McNairy, surveyor William T. Lewis, and Tennessee pioneer James Robertson were "subscribers" to a contract between John Gordon (later Jackson's personal spymaster in the wars of the 1810s) and William Colbert of the Chickasaw Nation, agreeing to establish and jointly operate a stand and ferry across the Duck River along the Natchez Trace. William Colbert fought in the Creek War against the Red Stick Creeks at the Battle of the Holy Ground in 1813, and along with brothers George, James, and Levi and 230 Chickasaw soldiers, took a number of Creek prisoners in Florida in 1814.

Colbert was a signatory to the Treaty of Chickasaw Bluffs in 1801, the Treaty of the Chickasaw Council House in 1816, and the Treaty of Chickasaw Old Town in 1818. Along with his brothers, George, Levi, and James, he was signatory to the September 1816 treaty negotiated by Andrew Jackson, David Meriwether, and Jesse Franklin, the second of two treaties that year. The treaty granted William Colbert an annuity of $100 a year for the rest of his life. According to Mississippi judge and local historian George H. Etheridge, writing in 1939, "Chooshemataha was a military leader of importance. He fought for the Chickasaws against the Creeks in numerous wars, the accounts of which seem never to have been recorded, was generally successful and had high prestige among his tribe. It is said that he fought with General Jackson against the Creeks in the war of 1813–1815. "Old Hickory" presented him, it is said by high authority, with a military uniform, which Chooshemataha (Wm. Colbert) wore with pride and distinction on important occasions until the end of his life. He lived in what is now Pontotoc county, a few miles south of where Pontotoc now stands at what was called 'Toc-shish.' This place was later put on the map as McIntoshville."

He was married twice, to Jessie Moniac and Ishtanaha, and fathered five children.

== See also ==
- David Moniac

== Sources ==
- Inman, Natalie R. (2017). Brothers and Friends: Kinship in Early America. Early American Spaces. Athens, Georgia: University of Georgia Press. doi:10.1353/book51901. ISBN 978-0-8203-5110-0. LCCN 2016055415. OCLC 985105661.
- Leach, Douglas Edward (December 1959). "John Gordon of Gordon's Ferry". Tennessee Historical Quarterly. 18 (4): 322–344. ISSN 0040-3261. JSTOR 42621449.
