= Arkansas Post =

Historic site in Arkansas, United States

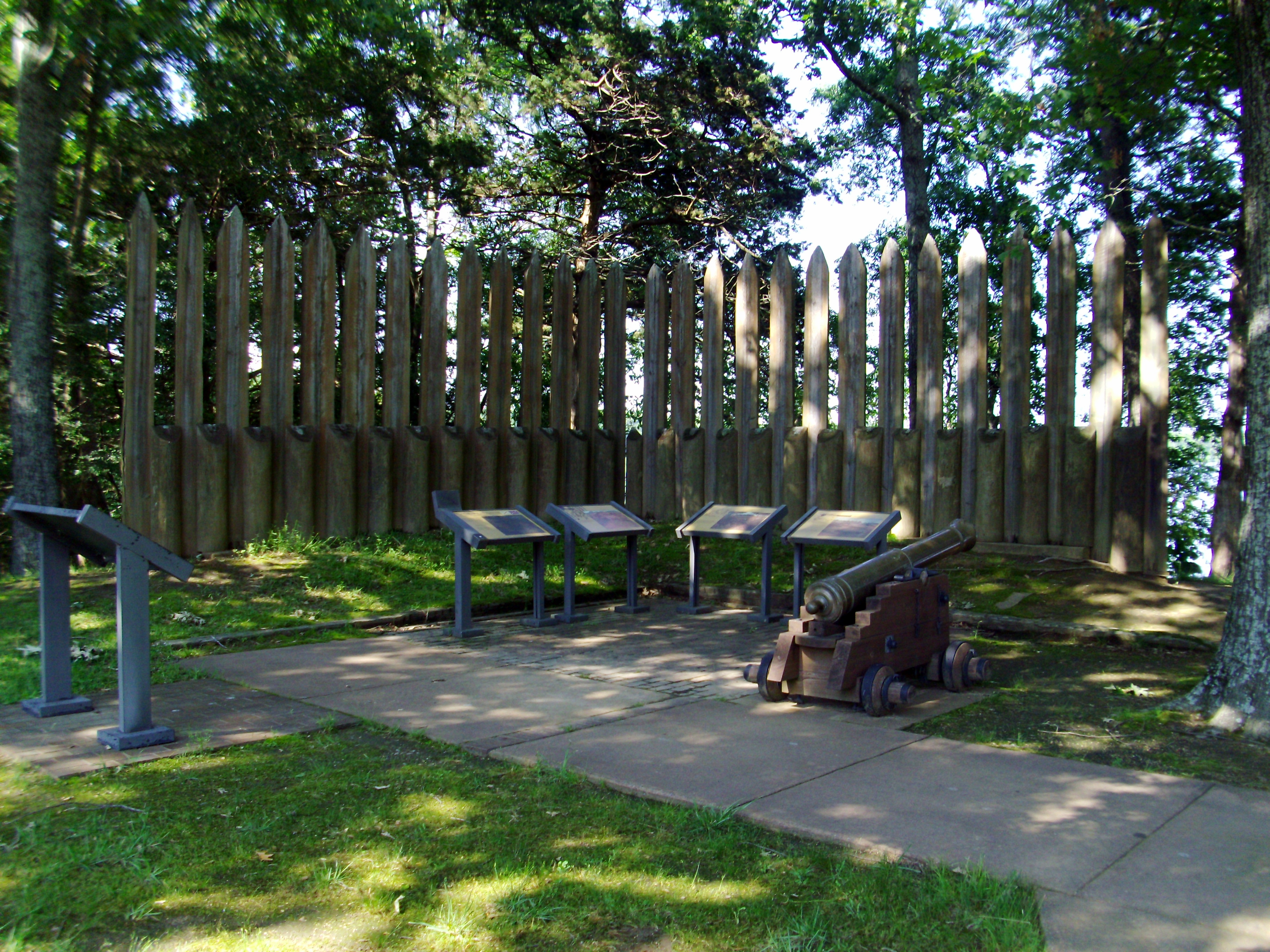
- Partial reconstruction of the Revolutionary War era fort

- Location within the United States
- Interactive map of Arkansas Post
- 34°01′00″N 91°20′43″W
- Nearest city: Gillett, Arkansas, U.S.

History
- Built: 1686 (340 years ago)
- Built for: Louis XIV of France
- Original use: Trading post

Site notes
- Elevation: 174 ft (53 m)
- Area: 757.51 acres (306.55 ha)
- Restored: February 27, 1929 (97 years ago)
- Restored by: Arkansas General Assembly; Works Progress Administration
- Governing body: U.S. National Park Service
- Visitors: 25,032 (in 2023)
- Website: nps.gov/arpo

U.S. National Register of Historic Places
- Official name: Arkansas Post National Memorial
- Designated: October 15, 1966 (59 years ago)
- Reference no.: 66000198

U.S. National Memorial
- Designated: July 6, 1960 (66 years ago)
- Designated by: President Dwight D. Eisenhower

The Arkansas Post (French: Poste de Arkansea; Spanish: Puesto de Arkansas), officially the Arkansas Post National Memorial, was the first European settlement located along the Mississippi River, in the Mississippi Alluvial Plain, and in the present-day U.S. state of Arkansas. In 1686, Henri de Tonti established it on behalf of Louis XIV of France for the purpose of trading with the Quapaw Nation.

The French, Spanish, and Americans, who acquired the territory in 1803 with the Louisiana Purchase, considered the site of strategic value. It was the capital of Arkansas from 1819 until 1821 when the territorial government relocated to Little Rock.

During the fur trade years, Arkansas Post was protected by a series of fortifications. The forts and associated settlements were located at three known sites and possibly a fourth. Some of the historic structures have been lost as the waterfront has been subject to erosion and flooding. The land encompassing the second (and fourth) Arkansas Post site (Red Bluff) was designated as a state park in 1929. In 1960, about 757.51 acres (306.55 ha) of land at the site were protected as the Arkansas Post National Memorial, a National Memorial and National Historic Landmark.

Since the 1950s, three archeological excavations have been conducted at Arkansas Post. Experts say the most extensive cultural resources at the site are archaeological, both for the 18th and 19th-century European-American settlements, and the earlier Quapaw villages. Due to changes of the Arkansas River and its navigation measures, the local water level has risen closer to the height of the bluffs, which used to be well above the river. The site is now considered low lying. Erosion and construction of dams, canals, and locks on the Arkansas and Mississippi rivers have resulted in the remains of three of the historic forts now being underwater in the river channel.

== History ==
=== French jurisdiction (1686–1763) ===
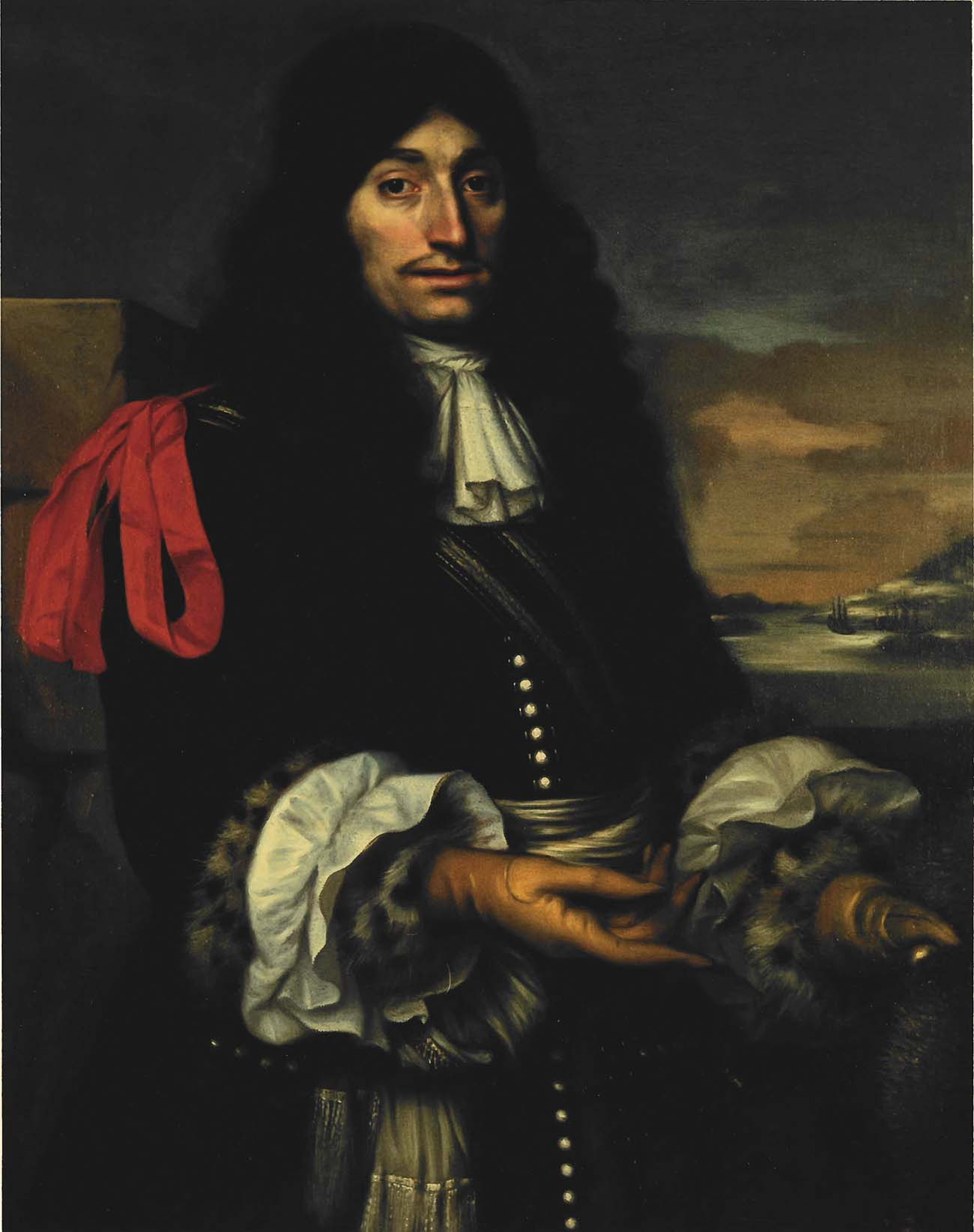
Henri de Tonti

==== First location ====
The Arkansas Post was founded in the summer of 1686 by Henri de Tonti, Jacques Cardinal, Jean Couture, Peter Bisaillon, and three other Frenchmen as a trading post near the site of a Quapaw village named Osotouy. It was about 35 miles upriver from the strategically significant confluence of the Arkansas River with the Mississippi River. The post was established on land given to De Tonti for his service in René-Robert Cavelier, Sieur de La Salle's 1682 expedition. The French came to an arrangement with the local Quapaw to trade French goods for beaver furs. This arrangement did not yield much profit, as the Quapaw had little interest in hunting beaver. But the trade and friendly relations with the Quapaw and other local native peoples, such as the Caddo and Osage, were integral to the post's survival for most of its operations.

The French settlers initially called the post Aux Arcs ("at the home of the Arkansas." Arkansea was the Algonquian name used by the Illinois and related tribes to refer to the Quapaw, and was adopted by the French.) The traders first built a simple wooden house and fence at the site. This was the first European settlement on the entire Mississippi River, the first permanent French holding along the west of the Mississippi, and the first European settlement in the Mississippi Alluvial Plain. Here the French conducted the first documented Christian services in Arkansas.

The importance of the post was fully realized in 1699, when King Louis XIV of France began to invest more resources into French Louisiana. John Law's Mississippi Company made a venture from 1717 to 1724 recruiting German settlers to develop the surrounding area as a major agricultural hub. The plan was to grow crops on the lower Arkansas for trade with Arkansas Post, New Orleans (which did not have the climate to support grain cultivation), and French Illinois. The French brought about 100 slaves and indentured servants to the area as workers, and offered land grants to German settlers. But this project failed when the company withdrew from Arkansas Post, due to financial decline related to the Mississippi Bubble. Most of the slaves and indentured servants were relocated or sold elsewhere along the Lower Mississippi River, but a few remained in or near the post, becoming hunters, farmers, and traders. By 1720, the post had lost much of its significance to the French because of the lack of profit, and the population was low. In 1723, the post was garrisoned by thirteen French soldiers, and Lieutenant Avignon Guérin de La Boulaye was the commander. Father Paul du Poisson was the priest at the post from July 1727 until his death in 1729. The post was significantly expanded in 1731, when its new commander, First Ensign Pierre Louis Petit de Coulange, built a barracks, a powder magazine, a prison, and a house for him and future commanders.

On May 10, 1749, during the Chickasaw Wars, the post engaged in its first military action. Chief Payamataha of the Chickasaw attacked the rural areas of the post with 150 of his warriors, killing and capturing several settlers.

The site of this first post is believed to be near what is now called the Menard–Hodges site, located about 5 miles (8.0 km) (but about 25 miles (40 km) by road) from the Arkansas Post Memorial. This property, also a National Historic Landmark, is owned by the National Park Service, and is undeveloped.

==== Second location (Red Bluff) ====
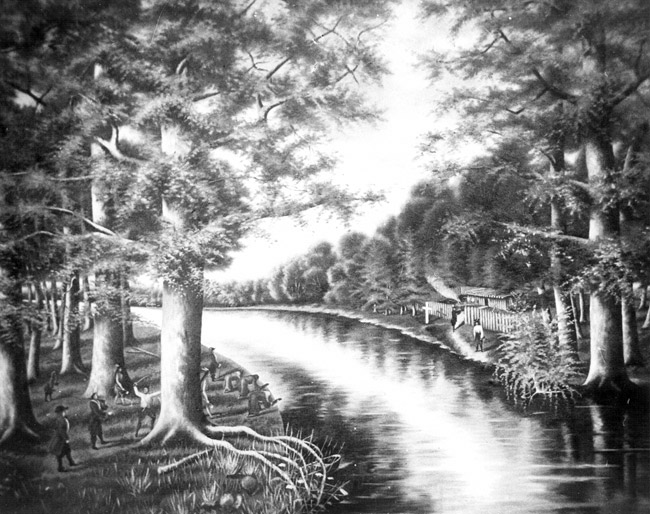
Annie Hatley, Depiction of Arkansas Post in 1689, Arkansas State Archives, 1904

As a result of the Chickasaw raid and continued threats of attack, commander Ensign Louis Xavier Martin de Lino moved the post upriver. This was further from the Chickasaw territory east of the Mississippi, and closer to the Quapaw villages, the post's main trading partners and potential allies. This new location, about 45 miles from the mouth of the Arkansas, was called Écores Rouges (Red Bluff), at "the heights of the Grand Prairie". It was situated on a bend in the river, on higher ground than the previous site.

In 1752, Captain Paul Augustin Le Pelletier de La Houssaye, the next commander, rebuilt the post's major structures, such as the barrack, prison, and powder magazine. In addition, he expanded the commander's house to include a chapel and quarters for the priest. He added a storehouse, hospital, bake house, and latrine. To protect the post's new buildings, he erected a stockade eleven feet in height.

==== Third location ====
In 1756, after the start of the Seven Years' War between France and England, Captain Francois de Reggio moved the post to a location 10 miles from the confluence with the Mississippi in order for the post to better respond to British and Chickasaw attacks. Whereas the first two locations had been on the Arkansas's north bank, this one was on the south. The layout of this post was generally similar to earlier ones, containing the usual important structures protected by a stockade.

=== Spanish jurisdiction (1763–1802) ===
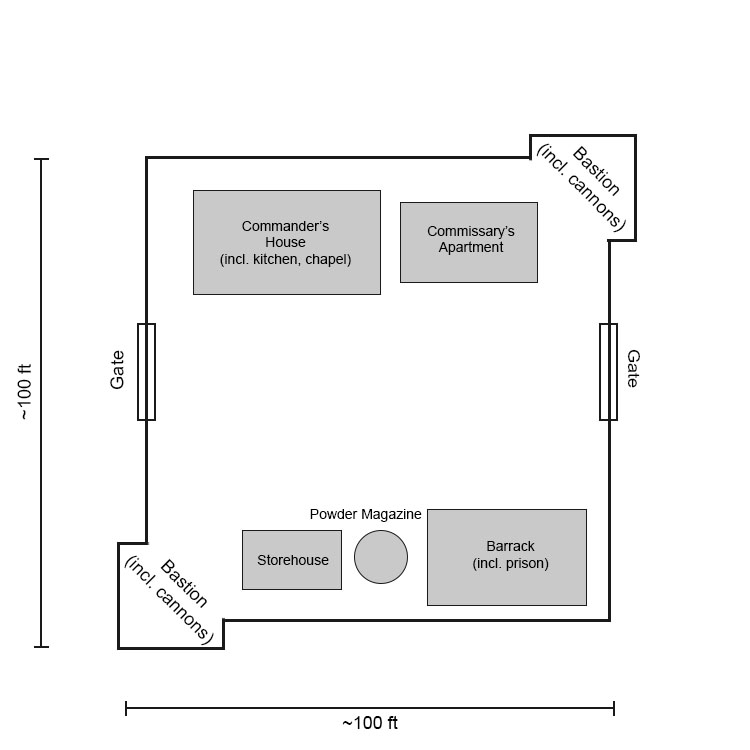
Diagram of the 1760s era stockade.

After the British defeated the French in the Seven Years' War and gained most of their North American territories east of the Mississippi, France ceded the area west of the Mississippi to Spain. This was in exchange for the British to gain land in Spanish Florida and give up any claims to Cuba. The post was officially ceded to Spain in 1763, but Spain did not take up its administration until 1771.

Initially, the Spanish kept the post at the third site and built the first Fort Carlos there to defend it. The majority of the post's population remained French. This reality complicated Spain's effort for diplomacy. In 1772, Commander Fernando de Leyba was ordered to assert dominance over the local French and to reduce the amount of feasts and gifts they provided for the local Quapaw, as it was costing the colonial government too much. The Quapaw nearly came to blows with the Spanish, but eventually Commander Leyba conceded to previous practice and restored the goods, and conflict was avoided.

==== Fourth location (Red Bluff) ====
In 1777 and 1778, the post was partially inundated by floodwaters. The garrison captain, Balthazar de Villiers, wrote to the Spanish governor of Louisiana, Bernardo de Gálvez, requesting the post be moved upriver. De Villiers cited annual flooding and the long distance from the local Quapaw villages as concerns. In the fall of 1778, Colonel David Rogers and Capt. Robert Benham made a stop here while on their way to meet with Gálvez to convince him that Spain should support the Continental Army in the American Revolutionary War.

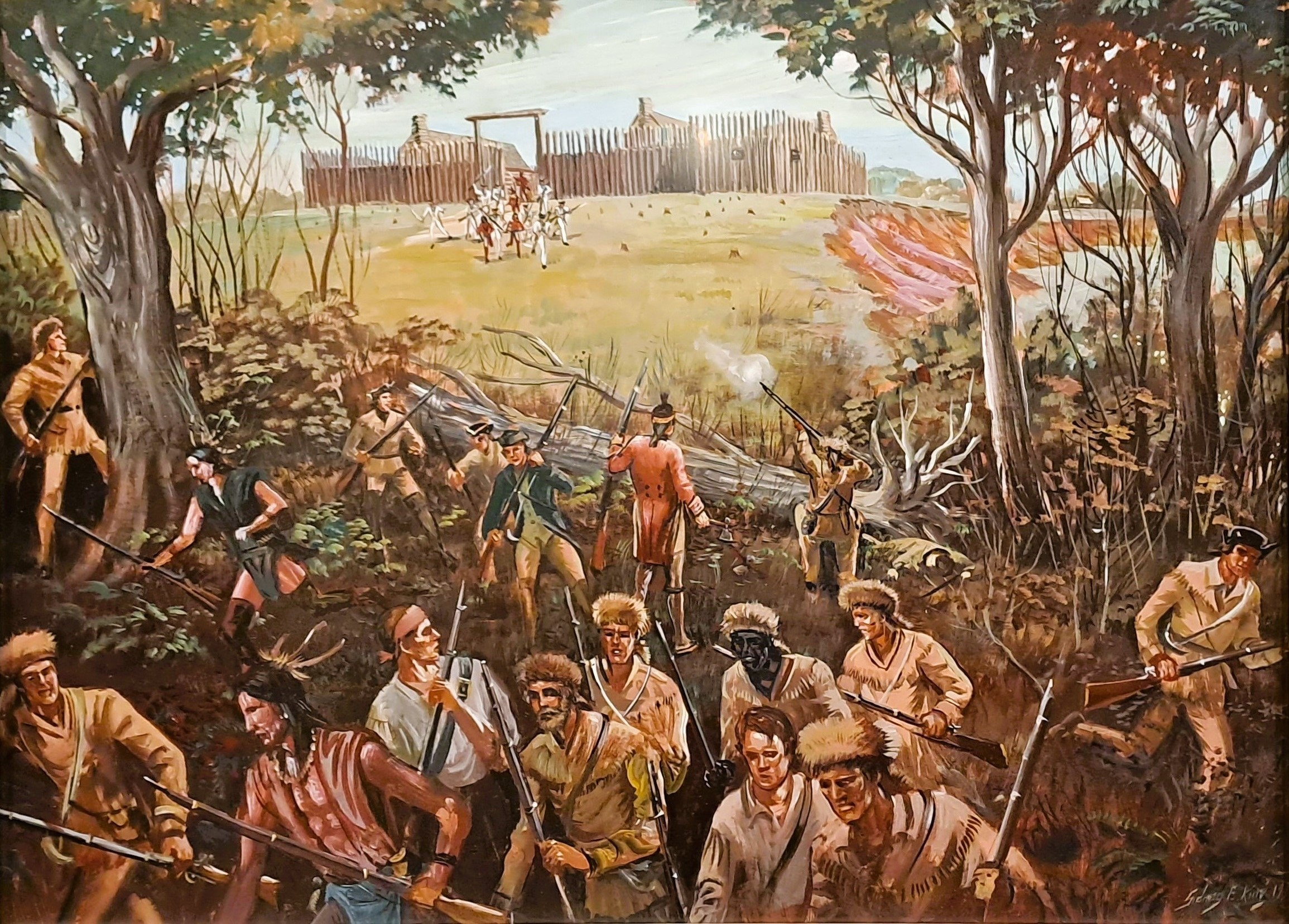
Counterattack! by Sidney E. King shows the sally made by the Louisiana Fixed Infantry Regiment and Quapaw during the April 17, 1783 British partisan raid on Fort Carlos III.

Gálvez gave permission for de Villiers to move the post back to the site of the second French post, 36 miles upriver at Red Bluff, and in 1779, the post was relocated. The colonists hoped the settlement would be less flood-prone. Fort Carlos III was built here in July 1781, near the former Le Houssaye fort. It consisted of several small buildings surrounded by a stockade. During the last two decades of the 18th century, several Americans from the new United States settled at the post. They developed a separate American village on the bluffs north of the river, nearer to the Quapaw villages. Many of these settlers arrived as refugees from the American Revolutionary War.

The only battle of the Revolution fought in present-day Arkansas took place on April 17, 1783, when Captain James Colbert of the 16th Regiment of Foot led a force of British partisans and Chickasaw allies on a raid against Spanish forces controlling Arkansas Post. This was part of a small British campaign against the Spanish on the Mississippi River during the American Revolutionary War, when power was shifting in North America. The Spanish defended it with their soldiers, Quapaw allies, and settlers acting as Indians to scare off the partisans.

Fort Carlos III suffered from constant river erosion, so the Spanish relocated the military garrison to a site about half a mile from the waterfront and, in March 1791, built Fort San Estevan (renamed Fort Madison after the Louisiana Purchase). Fort San Estevan included a commandant's house, large barracks, storehouse and kitchen, all surrounded by a stockade.

==== Second French ownership (1802–1804) ====
Although Spain ceded Louisiana and the Arkansas Post to France in 1800, no French officials were sent to administer the post. The Spanish garrison remained to oversee the post until the Louisiana Purchase was made by the United States.

=== United States jurisdiction (1804–present) ===
In 1804, Arkansas Post became a part of the United States as a result of the Louisiana Purchase from France. By the time the post was sold, it contained 30 houses in rows along two perpendicular streets. These were inhabited mostly by the post's ethnic French population.

The American settlers predominately lived in the separate villages north of the post, although further American settlement began after purchase by the United States. Americans built new buildings in the main part of the post alongside French and Spanish ones. The post was guarded by Fort Madison, in use until 1810, when it was abandoned in turn due to erosion and flooding.

In 1805, the U.S. government built a federal trading house at the north end of the post, operated by Jacob Bright. The location became a major frontier post for travelers heading west, with explorers such as Stephen Harriman Long and Thomas Nuttall passing through, although the government closed the federal house in 1810.

Arkansas Post was selected to be the capital of Arkansas County in 1813. In 1819, it was selected as the first capital of the new Arkansas Territory. It became the center of commercial and political life in Arkansas. The territory's first newspaper, the Arkansas Gazette, was founded in 1819 at the post by William E. Woodruff.

A tavern owned by William Montgomery was operated at the post, in Bright's trading house, from 1819 to 1821. This structure also served as the meeting place for the first Arkansas Territorial General Assembly in February 1820. During its period as territorial capital, Arkansas Post grew substantially, and two towns were established near it.

Gradually, settlement developed further into the Arkansas River Valley, and Little Rock became the territory's dominant settlement. When the territorial capital was moved there in 1821, the territory's major businesses and institutions moved as well. Arkansas Post lost much of its importance as a result.

The settlement continued to be active as a river town through the 1840s after steamboat traffic increased on the rivers. A French entrepreneur, Colonel Frederick Notrebe, came to dominate commercial life at the post. His establishment consisted of a house, a store, a brick store, a warehouse, a cotton gin, and a press. In the 1840s, the post was expanded with several new buildings, including one to serve as the Arkansas Post Branch of the State Bank of Arkansas. By the 1850s, the post was in a period of decline, and the population shrank significantly.

A well and cistern were built at the post in the early 1800s and remain intact at the memorial site to this day.

==== Confederate control (1861–1863) ====
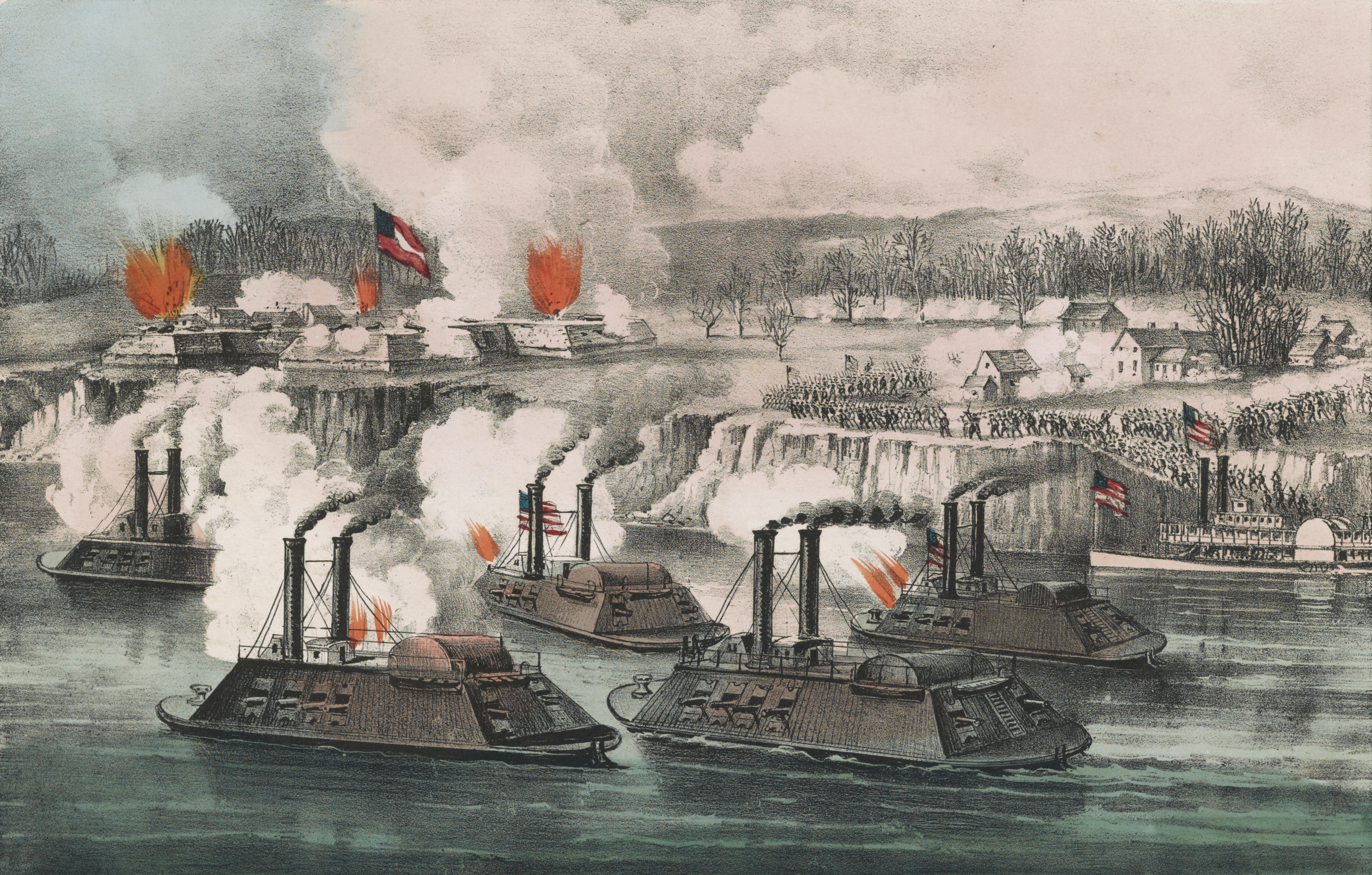
Battle of Fort Hindman, Ark., 1863

During the American Civil War, the post remained an important strategic site militarily. In 1862, the Confederate States Army constructed a massive defensive earthwork known as Fort Hindman, named after Confederate General Thomas C. Hindman. It was located on a bluff 25 feet (7.6 m) above the river on the north bank, with a one-mile (1.6 km) view up and downriver. It was designed to prevent Union forces from going upriver to Little Rock and to disrupt Union movement on the Mississippi. On January 9–11 of 1863, Union forces conducted an amphibious assault on the fortress backed by ironclad gunboats as part of the Vicksburg campaign. Because the Union forces outnumbered the defenders (33,000 to 5,500), they won an easy victory and captured the post, with most of the Confederate garrison surrendering. During the battle, the artillery bombardments destroyed or severely damaged the fort and some buildings in the town. Arkansas Post lost any status it had retained since being replaced as the territorial capital, and became a mostly rural area.

The Union victory relieved much of the harassment by Confederate forces on the Mississippi and contributed to the eventual victory at Vicksburg, Mississippi.

During the period of Confederate control, the state bank building was used as a hospital. Parts of the Confederate road, trenches, and artillery positions built at the post during this era are still visible at the memorial site.

== Description and administrative history ==
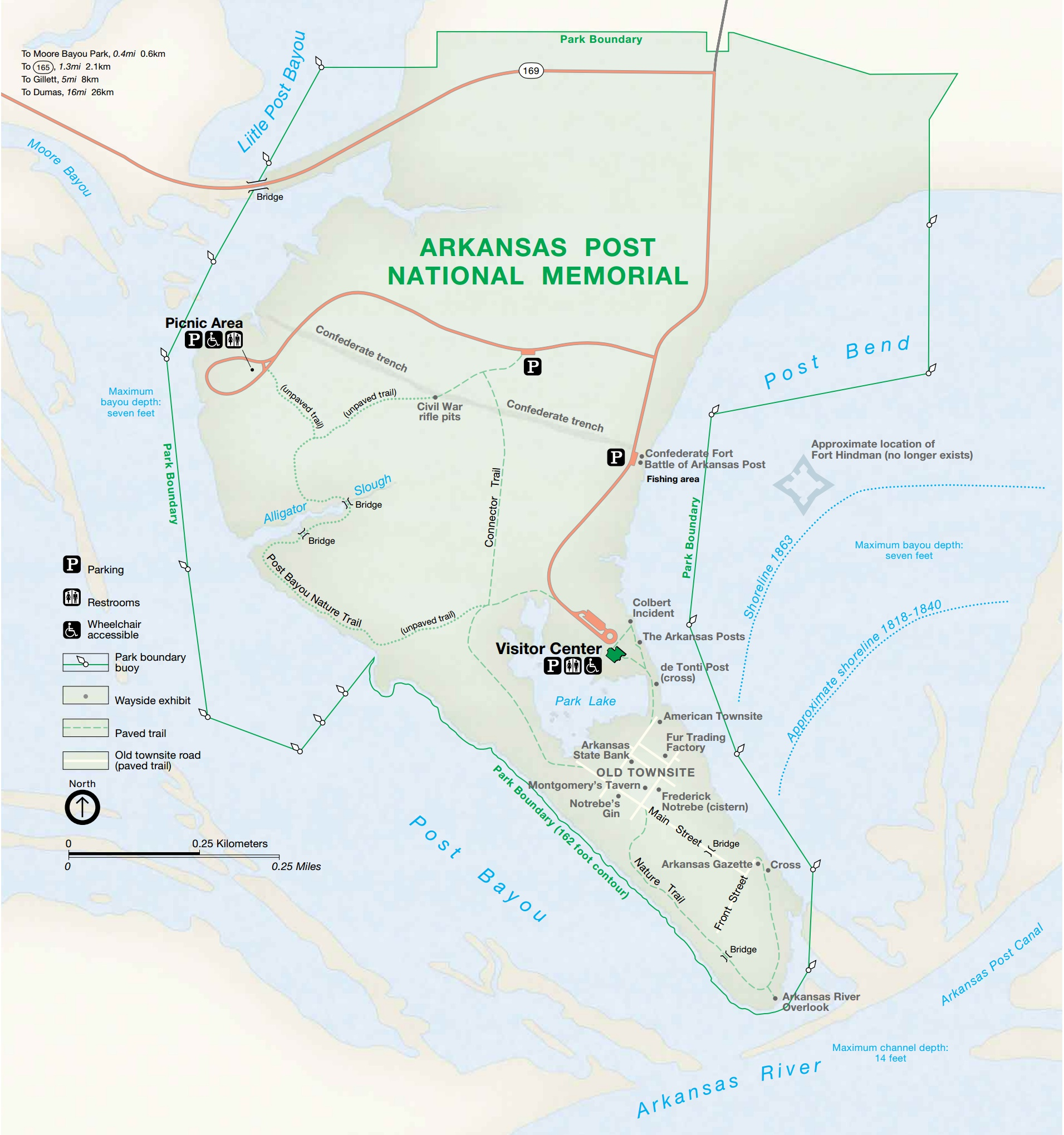
National Park Service map (1997)

The Arkansas Post National Memorial is a 757.51-acre (306.55 ha) protected area in Arkansas County, Arkansas, United States. The National Park Service manages 663.91 acres (268.67 ha) of the land, and the Arkansas Department of Parks, Heritage, and Tourism manages a museum on the remaining grounds.

The Memorial commemorates the complex history of several cultures and time periods: the Quapaw, French settlers who were the first colonists to inhabit the small entrepôt, the short period of Spanish rule, an American Revolutionary War skirmish in 1783, the settlement's role as the first territorial capital of Arkansas, and as the site of an American Civil War battle in 1863.

The former site of Arkansas Post was made into a state park in 1929. The park began with 20 acres donated by Fred Quandt, a descendant of German immigrants whose family still lives in Arkansas. In the following years, additional acreage was acquired and numerous improvements made with the support of Works Progress Administration labor.

On July 6, 1960, the site was designated a National Memorial, and a National Historic Landmark on October 9, 1960. As with all National Historic Landmarks, Arkansas Post was administratively listed on the National Register of Historic Places on October 15, 1966.

== Archaeology ==
In 1956–1957, Preston Holder conducted the first archeological excavations at the site. His team found remains of the eighteenth-century French colonial village within the area of the current memorial. The trenches discovered there were later identified as traditional French colonial residential building patterns of poteaux-en-terre. By this time, the remains of the 1752 La Houssaye fort, Fort Carlos III, 1790s Fort San Estevan, and Fort Hindman were all underwater in the former Arkansas River channel, an area then used as a navigation lake. No archeological evidence remains for those forts because of the erosion.

In 1964 the National Park Service undertook some partial reconstruction of colonial remains at the site, including Fort Carlos III built by the Spanish. Additional archeological excavations of the colonial settlement were done for the National Park Service in 1966 and 1970–1971. Nineteenth-century buildings identified include the state bank and residences. Most of the residences were built in a French or Spanish colonial style, although a house's architecture varied based on the resident's culture. Also discovered in various excavations were thousands of ceramic shards. John Walthall, the state archeologist for Arkansas, said in the 1990s that the archeological resources constitute the most valuable cultural resources within the area of the memorial, including nearly unexplored Quapaw settlements, as well as the 18th- and 19th-century European and American settlements. Archeological ventures have generally been more successful in the more northerly portion of the historic site because it was less prone to erosion and flooding. No physical traces remain of the post's historical waterfront because of such erosion.

== See also ==
- List of French forts in North America
- List of newspapers in Arkansas
- List of National Historic Landmarks in Arkansas
- List of national memorials of the United States
- National Register of Historic Places listings in Arkansas County, Arkansas
