= Holmes Colbert =

Chickasaw politician

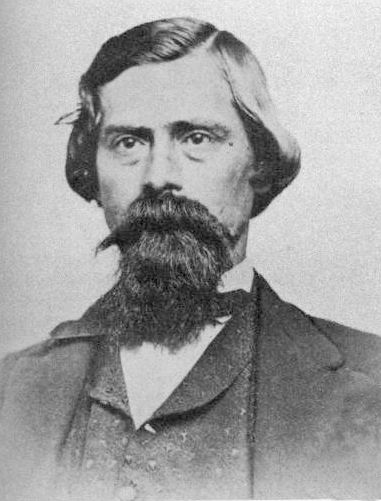
- Holmes Colbert, 1850s
- Born: 1829; Marshall County, Mississippi, US
- Died: March 24, 1872; Washington, DC, US
- Resting place: Bryan County, Oklahoma, US
- Citizenship: Chickasaw Nation
- Occupation: Government official
- Title: Colonel
- Spouse: Betsy Love Colbert

Holmes Colbert was a 19th-century leader and diplomat of the Chickasaw Nation in Indian Territory.

Of mixed European and Chickasaw ancestry, Colbert was born to his mother's Chickasaw clan and gained significance in the tribe's history through his family's privileged mixed-race status.

Educated in an American school, he knew of both European-American and Chickasaw cultures and contributed to his clan as a mediator between both worlds. He helped write the Chickasaw Nation's constitution in the 1850s after its removal to Indian Territory and reorganization of its government. After the American Civil War, Colbert then went on to serve as the tribe's delegate.

== Early life and education ==
Holmes Colbert was the son of James Isaac Colbert and Sarah "Sally" McLish. His father, James Isaac Colbert, the son of Maj. James Holmes Colbert already had some remote Chickasaw blood since he was the grandson of James Logan Colbert, a Scots trader from North Carolina who settled in Chickasaw country in the mid-18th century, and of his third wife, Minta Hoye, who had a Chickasaw mother herself. Since the Chickasaw have a matrilineal system, children are considered born into their mother's clan and gain recognition in the tribe through her legacy, including any hereditary leadership positions; the whole Colbert family was hence considered a part of the Chickasaw Nation. Regarding the Colberts, the status of the men's mothers, combined with their fathers' access to trade goods, led the male members of the family to become prominent landowners and leaders within the Chickasaw Nation. In all likelihood, Holmes and his wife Betsy had six sons themselves, though divergent sources mention that they had only five.

=== Colberts' leadership contributions ===
Historical records indicate that Holmes had six sons going by the names of William, George, Levi, Samuel, Joseph, and Pittman (or James). For nearly a century, the Colberts and their male descendants provided critical leadership as the Chickasaw faced their greatest challenges. The Chickasaw allied with the United States during the War of 1812. William Colbert served under General Andrew Jackson against the Red Sticks during the Creek Wars of 1813–14, a civil war within the Creek involving multiple factions as well as European and US belligerents, and his brothers George and Levi also joined the army. Within their clan and the Chickasaw Nation, the brothers were both affluent landowners and a political force to be reckoned with. George and Levi Colbert served as negotiators and interpreters in the 1820s-1830 during the tribe's negotiations with the US government related to Indian Removal.

== Political career ==
Holmes grew up learning about his family's leadership and was groomed for taking responsibilities in tribal affairs. He and his cousin Winchester created the governmental foundation of the Chickasaw Nation in Indian Territory (present-day Oklahoma). In the 1850s, Holmes Colbert helped write the constitution for their government, as after the Choctaw–Chickasaw Treaty of 1854, the Chickasaw constitution, establishing the nation as separate from the Choctaw, was signed in Tishomingo on the 30th of August, 1856.

== Marriage and children ==
Colbert married Elizabeth Betsy Love, daughter of Henry W. Love and his wife Sarah Ann Moore. Henry W Love son of Thomas Love wife Sally Colbert. They were both well educated, having been sent to schools out of state. Their mothers' clans were influential families in the Chickasaw Nation who were grooming their children for the future and believed they needed education to deal with European-Americans. The Colberts had three children together, but two died before the American Civil War.

Colbert and his wife owned about 100 acres (0.40 km^{2}) of cleared land, with more in timber. They held eight adult enslaved African Americans and several children in what is now Oklahoma.

"My mother died when I was real small, and about a year after that my father died. Master Holmes [Colbert] told us children not to cry, that he and Miss Betsy would take good care of us. They did, too. They took us in their house with them and looked after us just as good as they could colored children. We slept in a little room clost to them and she always seen that we was covered up good before she went to bed."

— - Polly Colbert, former slave, Interview: Polly Colbert, 1937

family history states James Holmes Colbert son of James Issac son of James Holmes son of, James Logan was born September 22, 1828, in Marshall County, Mississippi, and died March 24, 1872, in Washington, D.C. He married Elizabeth Love, daughter of Henry Love and Sarah Moore. She was born Abt. 1833 in Mississippi, and died 1914.\\ Love daughter Henry W.son of Sally Colbert, daughter James Logan) was born Abt. 1833 in Mississippi, and died 1914.She married James Holmes Colbert, son of James Colbert and Sarah McLish.He was born September 22, 1828, in Marshall County, Mississippi, and died March 24, 1872, in Washington, D.C..

Children of Elizabeth Love and James Colbert are:

	318	i.	 	Eliphett Nott Colbert, born September 21, 1856; died November 21, 1863.
	319	ii.	 	Eula Colbert, born July 1869.

== Chickasaw delegate ==
After the American Civil War, the US required a new treaty from the Chickasaw Nation, as the tribe had supported the Confederacy. Holmes Colbert represented the tribe as a delegate to Washington, DC during these negotiations and later to Congress. One of the provisions of the peace treaty required the Chickasaw to emancipate their slaves, as the US had done, and offer those who wanted to stay in Indian Territory citizenship as Chickasaw or relocate to become US citizens. Their decision during this time to refuse citizenship to the Freedmen who stayed, as well as having previously formed an alliance with the Confederacy, likely played a role in the decision for the US government to take over half the land the Chickasaw owned from previous treaties without any compensation. Unlike the Freedmen of the other "Five Civilized Tribes," from emancipation in 1866 up until Oklahoma gained statehood in 1907, Freedmen that remained inside Chickasaw boundaries were essentially country-less. However they were later documented as Chickasaw Freedmen on the Dawes Rolls.

== Death ==
Holmes Colbert died of typhoid fever in Washington, DC, in 1872.

== Legacy ==
- The constitution of the Chickasaw Nation
- Colbert, Oklahoma was named after the family.

== See also ==
- George Colbert, his uncle
- Levi Colbert, his uncle
- Chickasaw Nation
- Choctaw
- Fred Waite
- John Herrington
