= Kolbert =

Kolbert is a surname. Notable people named Kolbert are:

- Elizabeth Kolbert (born 1961), journalist and author, staff writer for The New Yorker, especially on climate change
- Kathryn Kolbert, lawyer and journalist, activist on women's reproductive rights

== See also ==
- Colbert (disambiguation)
