= Fort Jefferson (Kentucky) =

United States historic site

Coordinates: 36°57′11.19″N 89°05′23.25″W

- Kentucky County, Virginia (present-day Ballard County, Kentucky)

Site information
- Type: Stockade
- Controlled by: Virginia

Site history
- Built: April 19–June 1780
- Built by: (United States) Clark's Illinois Battalion
- In use: April 19, 1780–June 8, 1781
- Materials: Wood
- Fate: Abandoned by garrison
- Battles/wars: American Revolutionary War; Siege of Fort Jefferson

Garrison information
- Past commanders: Capt. Robert George
- Garrison: 100 state troops

Siege of Fort Jefferson
- Part of the American Revolutionary War
Date	August 27–31, 1780
Location	Kentucky County, Virginia (present-day Ballard County, Kentucky)
Result	American victory

Belligerents
United States	Great Britain; Chickasaw Nation

Commanders and leaders
(United States) Robert George: William Clark; Leonard Helm	(Kingdom of Great Britain) John Whitehead: James Colbert (WIA)

Strength
100 state troops 46 militia	2 provincial troops 150 Chickasaw

Casualties and losses
8 dead and 3 wounded or missing	Probably about the same as American casualties

Fort Jefferson was a small 18th-century stockade fort built by Virginia at the mouth of the Ohio in present-day Kentucky. It was constructed in 1780 by Clark's Illinois Battalion during the American Revolutionary War. The fort was abandoned in June 1781.

== History ==
The initial proposal for a fortification at the mouth of the Ohio was made by Virginia governor Patrick Henry in 1777, in a letter to the Spanish governor of Louisiana, Bernardo de Galvez. He proposed a fortification to protect trade and supplies between Virginia and Spanish Louisiana from British interference. Henry would also propose this idea to George Rogers Clark, who saw it as a fortification for frontier protection and conquest of British Indian allies. Clark would later press Henry's successor, Thomas Jefferson, on the importance of a fort along both rivers, to control commerce and stop British supplies.

In January 1780, Jefferson formally approved the fort with the formal stipulation that the land must be purchased from the Chickasaw, whom he erroneously identified as Cherokee. Jefferson would also write to Joseph Martin that "the ground at the mouth of the Ohio on the south side belonging to the Cherokee, we would not meddle in without their leave". George Rogers Clark would go on to ignore this provision, as he would not buy the land from the Chickasaw or gain their consent to build the fortifications. Many historians point to Clark's disregard of the Chickasaw as the point at which the fortification and settlement project was doomed to failure.

In 1782, four Chickasaw chiefs sent a letter to American military post commanders in the West to initiate peace negotiations, stating, "What damage occurred because you established a fort in our hunting grounds without our permission, and at that location, you suffered most from us." The Chickasaw would eventually sign a peace treaty with the Spanish (representing the American alliance) that respected Chickasaw territorial integrity, but kept them at war with the Kickapoo.
