= William McGillivray (Chickasaw) =

Chickasaw leader

William McGillivray (native name Coahoma, meaning Red Cat or Red Tiger) was a leader of the Chickasaw people of North America in the 18th and 19th centuries. Along with James Brown and William Colbert, he was one member of a Chickasaw delegation that met with George Washington in 1795. The delegation was accompanied by interpreter Malcolm McGee and Robert Hays, a brother-in-law of Andrew Jackson. They went to Philadelphia seeking military aid from the United States in a war against the Muscogee Confederation.

According to Mississippi historian and local judge George H. Ethridge, Coahoma, meaning Red Cat or Red Tiger, is most likely a reference to the American panther, Puma concolor. According to Judge Ethridge, Coahoma "was said to be conspicuous among the Chickasaw chiefs. They had many able chiefs and to be conspicuous among such men he must have been a formidable warrior and a skillful hunter. He lived to a great age. An inhabitant of Holly Springs in years gone by says of him: 'McGillivray was a very old man, had served under Washington, and was commissioned by him as captain of the United States army, and stationed at Fort Pitt, now Pittsburgh, Pa., in the old war. I have seen his commission and it is now in the possession of his son near Fort Towson, Choctaw and Chickasaw nation west."

In 1805, McGillivray was a signatory to the Treaty of the Chickasaw Nation signed at or near the home of Wolf's Friend on July 23. Beginning in 1815, U.S. government Indian agents organized districts for paying out annuities to the tribes. Coahoma was the chief of the northwest district, the other chiefs as of 1818 were Samuel Seeley, Tishomingo, and Apassantubb. McGillivray was a signatory to the 1816 treaty with the Chickasaw. Both Coahoma County and Tishomingo County in Mississippi are named for Chickasaw chiefs, with the locations broadly corresponding to their associated "annuity district".

== Sources ==
- Atkinson, James R. (2010). Splendid Land, Splendid People: The Chickasaw Indians to Removal. Tuscaloosa: University of Alabama Press. ISBN 978-0-8173-8337-4.
