= Colbert raid =

1783 battle of the American Revolutionary War

- Part of the American Revolutionary War
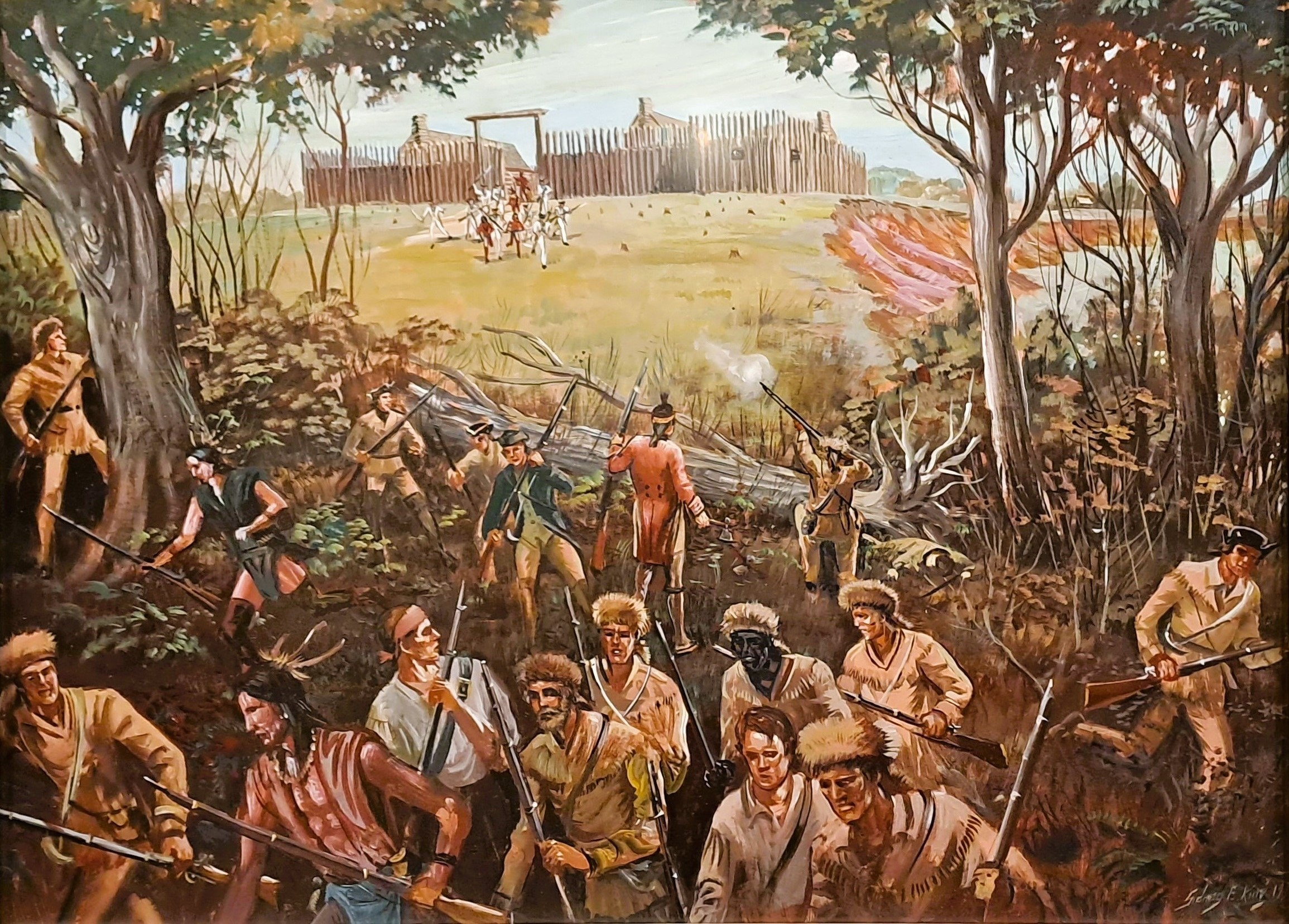
- Counterattack! by Sidney E. King shows the sally from Fort Carlos III made by Sergeant Alexo Pastor, nine soldiers of the Louisiana regiment, and four Quapaw warriors during the six hour siege of the fort.
Date	April 17, 1783 (243 years ago)
Location	Arkansas Post, Louisiana (present-day Arkansas) 34°1′5.37″N 91°20′43.43″W
Result	Spanish victory

Belligerents
Spain; Quapaw Nation	Great Britain; Chickasaw Nation

Commanders and leaders
(Spanish Empire) Jacobo du Breuil: Luis de Villars (POW); Alexo Pastor	(Kingdom of Great Britain) James Colbert

Strength
36 regulars 4 Quapaw	71 irregulars 11 Chickasaw

Casualties and losses
2 killed 1 wounded 6 captured	1 killed 1 wounded
- Location of battle in Arkansas

The Colbert raid, also known as the Battle of Arkansas Post, was an unsuccessful British attempt to capture Fort Carlos III, garrisoned by a detachment of the Louisiana Fixed Infantry Regiment, and the Franco-Spanish village of Arkansas Post, Louisiana (present-day Arkansas), during the American Revolutionary War.

During the early morning of April 17, 1783, a large party of British irregulars and Chickasaw led by Captain James Colbert of the 16th Regiment of Foot attacked the settlement and fort. It was one of the last battles of the American Revolutionary War, and the only one fought in present-day Arkansas. A surprise sally by the Spanish and Quapaw defenders caused Colbert's men to rout.

The raid was a part of a series of small engagements fought between Great Britain and Spain in the Lower Mississippi River region from 1779, when Spain entered the American Revolutionary War on the side of the United States. The event took place three months after a treaty between Spain and Britain was signed on January 3, 1783, but word of it had not yet reached the Spanish settlement.

== Background ==
Spanish forces had won several victories in the Lower Mississippi River region, driving out the British from Manchac and Baton Rouge and taking numerous prisoners. By 1783, British forces in the region were severely scattered, almost non-existent, and consisted only of small irregular groups engaged in guerrilla warfare. James Colbert, a British officer, was a leader of one such group, managing to rally a small number of irregulars to continue the fight against the Spanish.

Colbert's primary target was Arkansas Post because of its strategic location at the confluence of the Arkansas and Mississippi rivers, and he had been planning an attack on the Spanish trading post for about a year. If it could be captured, his irregulars could easily harass Spanish traffic on the Mississippi without consequence. Arkansas Post was inhabited by a garrison of 33 men of the Louisiana Fixed Infantry Regiment and four Quapaw warriors, in addition to the commander, Captain Jacobo du Breuil; his second-in-command, Lieutenant Luis de Villars; and Sergeant Alexo Pastor.

== Prelude ==
In early April, Colbert and his flotilla set off from their encampment on the Wolf River. On the Mississippi, Colbert's party encountered American vessels headed downriver to Natchez for settlement. These settlers were ordered to land and wait ashore for six days. Further down, near the mouth of the White River, Colbert encountered trading vessels from both New Orleans and Arkansas Post. These were seized along with their goods. The flotilla then proceeded up the Arkansas river.

Not far from the post, on April 16, Colbert ordered several Chickasaw to scout ahead. These scouts encountered the Quapaw village, Osotouy. Here they told the local chief, Angaska, who was allied to the Spanish and regularly corresponded with Captain Jacobo du Breuil, that they were only going upriver "with a dozen Americans to shake hands with Captain Du Breuil.” They then presented the chief with rum as a gift.

As a result of this deception, Angaska did not report upriver to Du Breuil that anything was suspicious. The scouts then rendezvoused with the main party and proceeded upriver. By midnight, April 17, the British had made it to the habitant shore of the post. To ensure no villagers or guards would be alerted by the approach, Colbert had the paddles of his vessels muffled with leather. Colbert landed his force slightly downriver from the village, leaving seven men to guard the canoes.

== The raid ==
The battle began with an initial raid of the village at about 2:30 a.m., resulting in an occupation by the attacking force. Although four families escaped the village and proceeded to seek shelter in nearby Fort Carlos III the attackers took most prisoner, including Lieutenant Luis de Villars and Sergeant Alexo Pastor. Awakened by the commotion, the garrison launched a counter-attack, led by Jacobo du Breuil. During this engagement, the Spanish garrison sustained two losses and Pastor escaped from British captivity, reaching the fort in the chaos of battle. No other prisoners escaped during the fighting. Afterward, the Spanish garrison retreated to the fort, unmolested by British fire.

At about 3:00 a.m., the attacking force began to entrench themselves in a ravine just outside the fort, which, due to its location among trees and bush, they could approach "within pistol shot". The two sides exchanged gunfire for six hours, with neither sustaining casualties because of both the strength of the fort's palisade walls and the attackers' entrenched position, which offered good shelter from the 4-pounder cannons that the defenders employed. At 9:00 a.m., Commander Dubrueil ordered Sergeant Pastor, nine soldiers, and four Quapaw warriors to prepare to make a sortie. Dubreil suspected that the attackers might be setting up artillery with which to breach the fort.

At the same time, Colbert sent forth one of his officers under a flag of truce to deliver a peace offer demanding surrender. Marie Luisa de Villars, the wife of the lieutenant and fellow prisoner, accompanied Colbert's officer to ensure he would not be shot approaching the fort. At this point, the exchange of gunfire ceased. Colbert's officer fled suddenly in fright, and Du Breuil received the peace offer, written by Colbert in French, from Madame de Villars alone:

M. Le Capitaine Colbert is sent by his superiors to take the post of the Arkansas and by this power Sir, he demands that you capitulate. It is his plan to take it with all his forces, having already taken all the inhabitants, together with the Lieutenant Luis de Villars and his family.

Du Breuil refused to surrender, and ordered a sally. Sergeant Alexo Pastor and his force of 13 sallied out of the fort toward the 82 attackers, shouting Quapaw war cries. The apparent shock of this sally, mixed with war cries and volleys of musket fire, scattered the attacking force, which immediately retreated to the river and boarded the canoes with their prisoners. According to Dubreil, Colbert's men yelled "Let's go! Let's go! The Indians are upon us," as they fled. One attacker was killed in the retreat.

== Aftermath ==
Following the rout, Colbert drove a tomahawk into the ground near the riverbank, symbolizing his intent to return, and had another message sent to Dubreil via one of the village inhabitants:

You can form an idea of my forces, at 12 today 500 Chickasaws are due to arrive and also two bateaux loaded with men, armed with four swivels and a cannon and if the Commandant of the fort does not surrender before the said hour and I am victorious, as I have no doubt I shall be, I do not know whether I can hold my people or not, and if the... [Quapaw] are used against us I myself will order the prisoners killed.

This message was ignored by Dubreil and the reinforcements mentioned by Colbert never materialized when Dubreil failed to surrender the fort. Chief Angaska arrived at the post at noon that day, and was scolded by Dubreil for his failure to send word about the approaching force. Angaska, after explaining the deception by Colbert's scouts, was sent with 100 Quapaw and 20 Spanish soldiers to recover the prisoners taken by the retreating British.

On April 24, Angaska reached Colbert's flotilla near the mouth of the Arkansas River and proceeded to negotiate for the release of the prisoners. Bluffing that he had 250 men, Angaska convinced Colbert to release all but eight of his prisoners. Lieutenant Luis de Villars and his wife were among those freed, but before being released, the lieutenant was allowed to sign an agreement securing the release of five British irregulars arrested by the local Spanish government for rebellious activities in Natchez.

Lieutenant Luis de Villars agreed to this under pain of re-imprisonment by Colbert or a fine, and the agreement was later fulfilled when the rebels were paroled on De Villar's request. On May 5, Dubreil wrote to the Spanish Louisiana governor, Esteban Miró, detailing the battle and praising the competence of his men. On May 16, Miró wrote to Colbert, informing him of the January 20 preliminary peace treaty between the two sides and requesting that all property and prisoners be returned unconditionally. Although the remaining prisoners were released, Colbert refused to return the property seized in the raid.
