= French ship Colbert =

Six ships of the French Navy have bourne the name Colbert in honour of Jean Baptiste Colbert :

- French corvette Colbert, a French wheeled corvette, launched in 1848
- French ironclad Colbert a French armoured frigate, launched in 1877
  - Colbert-class ironclad, the class of the 1877 Colbert
- French ship Colbert (1915), an auxiliary patrol boat (1915–1917)
- French ship Colbert (1917), an auxiliary sail ship (1917)
- French cruiser Colbert (1928) a World War II French heavy cruiser, launched in 1928, destroyed in the Scuttling of the French fleet in Toulon in 1942
- French cruiser Colbert (C611), an anti-aircraft cruiser, launched in 1956

== See also ==
- Colbert (disambiguation)
