= Pierre David de Colbert-Chabanais =

French Napoleonic general and nobleman (1774–1853)

Pierre David Édouard de Colbert-Chabanais
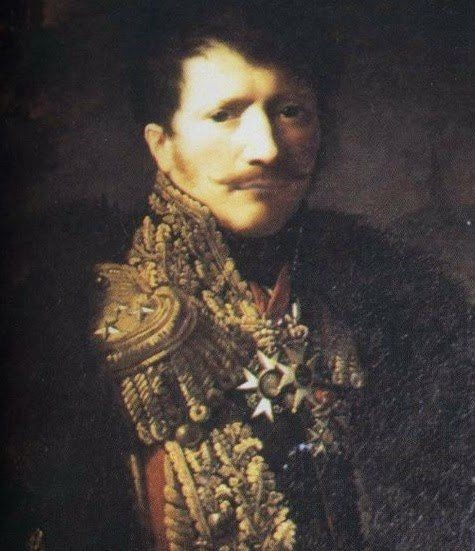
- Pierre David Édouard de Colbert-Chabanais
- Born: 18 October 1774; Paris, France
- Died: 28 December 1853 (aged 79) Paris, France
- Allegiance: French First Republic, First French Empire; Kingdom of France; Second French Empire
- Branch: Cavalry
- Service years: 1793–1853
- Rank: général de division

Pierre David Édouard de Colbert-Chabanais (French pronunciation: [pjɛʁ david edwaʁ də kɔlbɛʁ ʃabanɛ]; Paris, 18 October 1774 – 1853) was a general of the French Revolutionary Wars and Napoleonic Wars. Fearless, charismatic and always smartly dressed, he was regarded as a cavalry officer of the highest caliber and noted for his unbreakable loyalty to Napoleon and popularity with those under his command.

== Life ==
=== Revolution ===
Born in Paris to a prosperous noble family descended from the prestigious Colbert line, he was the son of the comte de Colbert, a rich landowner. On 23 August 1793, Pierre followed the traditional family route into the army, which was now the Republican army, although he was suspicious of the French Revolution. He fought in the 1793 campaigns in the Army of the Rhine, as a member of the bataillon de Paris, also known as the bataillon Guillaume-Tell after William Tell. He moved to the 11th Hussar Regiment, gaining promotion to maréchal-des-logis in September 1793 and to sous-lieutenant the following month.

After three years in the Army of the Rhine and in the armies suppressing the Vendéan Revolt, he was dismissed by Lazare Hoche in 1796 for supposed royalist sympathy due to his background. He left the 7th Hussars to become a commissaire des guerres to the armée d'Orient, with the job of guaranteeing Bonaparte's supply lines to Egypt. During that time Bonaparte took him under his wing. Colbert was wounded in the fighting in Upper Egypt and was promoted to captain in the 3rd Dragoon Regiment (France) which distinguished itself at Battle of Abukir (1799). He was then made Aide-de-camp to Damas who was serving as chief of staff to Kléber and fought at Heliopolis and Alexandria.

=== First Empire ===
Returning to the army after Egypt, he became adjudant-major to the Mamelukes and aide-de-camp to Junot in 1803. He then followed Junot to become part of the armée des côtes.

Colbert left Junot in 1805 and followed major général Maréchal Berthier as his aide de camp. He distinguished himself in the Ulm campaign and at Austerlitz, where he was wounded in the thigh and made a chef d'escadron. When the War of the Fourth Coalition broke out in 1806, he fought bravely at Iena and Pułtusk. In 1807 he was made a colonel and head of his old regiment, the 7th Hussars and saw action at Eylau, Heilsberg and Friedland. Under Colbert, this unit became one of the most famed cavalry regiments in the army and was now part of Lassalle's brigade, nicknamed the "infernal" brigade due to its passion. On July 17, 1807, in one of the last skirmishes of the campaign, Colbert was in the thick of the actions and received three blows by Cossack pikes. Napoleon recognized Colbert's exemplary service and made him a knight of the Légion d'honneur in 1808 and baron de Chabanais et de l'Empire in 1809

Colbert was promoted to général de brigade on 9 March 1809 and put under the orders of Oudinot. He won great glory at the Battle of Raab by charging and defeating Ott's hussars, cutting several squadrons of the enemy Hungarian cavalry to pieces and coming to the aid of the 9th Hussar Regiment, which the Austrians were on the point of overwhelming. At Wagram Colbert fought gallantly and was shot in the head and was made a commander of the Légion d'honneur.

Attached to the Imperial Guard in 1811, he re-formed and commanded the 2e régiment de chevau-légers lanciers de la Garde impériale (better known as the Red Lancers, they were also nicknamed the écrevisses or crayfish, after their red uniforms). This regiment would quickly garner an elite status, famed for its prowess on the battlefield and loyalty to the Emperor. He also led the brigade for the whole of the Russian campaign under the orders of the duc d'Istrie. He and the Lancers performed exceptionally well during the initial advance, repeatedly besting enemy horsemen in skirmishes and seizing large amounts of Russian supplies, then fighting at Smolensk, Borodino and Tarutino, where they expertly covered the withdrawal of Joachim Murat and his troops. During the horrors of the Russian retreat, Colbert's cavalry bravely covered the Grande Armée's rear. During the German campaign of 1813, Colbert further demonstrated his superb abilities as a cavalry leader, at Bautzen he broke and routed the Russians and cut them to pieces. He continued to win praise for his conduct at Dresden, Leipzig and Hanau. On 25 November 1813 he was promoted to général de division during the retreat back through Germany .

=== 1814–1817 ===
During the 1814 defence of France General Colbert displayed his usual bravery and skill, fighting at Brienne, La Rothière, Champaubert, Château-Thierry, Montmirail, Vauchamps, Nangis, Montereau, Craonne, Laon, Reims, Arcis-sur-Aube and Saint-Dizier. Upon Napoleon's abdication, Colbert submitted to the Bourbons, who made him a chevalier de Saint-Louis and commander of the lancers corps in the royal guard. On Napoleon's return, general Colbert dithered until 23 March 1815. When Colbert came to the Tuileries, Napoleon said to him "General Colbert, I've been waiting for you for three days", to which Colbert replied "I have been waiting for you for a year" and Napoleon put him in command of his personal guard. Colbert was present at Quatre Bras, being the first French unit commander to arrive on the field after previously skirmishing with enemy outposts at Frasnes during the initial advance. In the course of the battle, he was wounded in the left arm but continued to lead his men two days later at Waterloo with his arm in a sling. After the armée de la Loire was disbanded the Bourbons held a grudge against Colbert. He thus returned home, only for his loyalty to turn against him – in 1816 he was arrested without charge, held in the Prison de l'Abbaye for two months and exiled on his release. In 1817, however, he was recalled.

=== 1826–1853 ===
After ten years' inactivity, his military career resumed in 1826 and he became inspector general of cavalry and commander of a division of the camp de Lunéville. After the July Revolution in 1830, he was put in charge of disbanding the eight cavalry regiments of the former royal guard. In 1834, general Colbert became aide-de-camp to Prince Louis, Duke of Nemours, accompanying the prince to Africa and taking part in the first expedition to Constantine in 1836. He was made a peer of France in 1838 and Grand Cross of the Légion d'honneur in 1839. He was standing next to Louis Philippe I during Giuseppe Marco Fieschi's assassination attempt and was wounded by Fieschi's gun. He died in 1853, one of the last surviving generals to have served under Napoleon and witnessed the creation of the Second Empire.

== Coat of arms ==
D'or, à la couleuvre ondoyante en pal d'azur surmontée d'un lambel du second; au canton des Barons militaires de l'Empire brochant.

== Sources ==
- (in French) Marie-Nicolas Bouillet and Alexis Chassang (ed.), "Pierre David de Colbert-Chabanais" in Dictionnaire universel d’histoire et de géographie, 1878
- (in French) "Pierre David de Colbert-Chabanais", in Charles Mullié, Biographie des célébrités militaires des armées de terre et de mer de 1789 à 1850, 1852
- (in French) P Louis Lainé, Archives généalogiques et historiques de la noblesse de France, ou, Recueil de preuves, mémoires et notices généalogiques, servant à constater l'origine, la filiation, les alliances et lés illustrations religieuses, civiles et militaires de diverses maisons et familles nobles du royaume, 1830;
- http://www.napoleon-series.org/research/commanders/c_colbert.html
- http://www.virtualarc.com/officers/colbert1/
