= Colbert, Oklahoma =

Town in Oklahoma, US

- Town
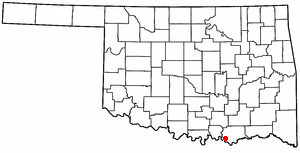
- Location of Colbert, Oklahoma
- Coordinates: 33°51′28″N 96°30′21″W
- Country: United States
- State: Oklahoma
- County: Bryan

Government
  - Mayor: James Coble

Area
  - Total: 1.37 sq mi (3.56 km^{2})
  - Land: 1.36 sq mi (3.52 km^{2})
  - Water: 0.015 sq mi (0.04 km^{2})
- Elevation: 682 ft (208 m)

Population (2020)
  - Total: 1,027
  - Density: 755/sq mi (291.5/km^{2})
- Time zone: UTC-6 (Central (CST))
  - Summer (DST): UTC-5 (CDT)
- ZIP code: 74733
- Area code: 580
- FIPS code: 40-16050
- GNIS feature ID: 2413223
- Website: www.townofcolbertok.org

Colbert is a town in Bryan County, Oklahoma, United States. As of the 2020 census, Colbert had a population of 1,027. It was incorporated in 1939.

== History ==
Colbert men became prominent leaders among the Chickasaw for most of the 18th and 19th centuries, starting with William "de Blainville" Colbert from France born of Scottish blood. His parents fled during the Glorious Revolution in Scotland; hence, he was born in exile in Blainville-sur-Orne, France. William traveled to the New World to seek a new line of work as a fur trader since the Jacobite uprisings had ruined his entitlements as a "King Baron." These Colberts were also related to Jean Baptiste Colbert, Treasurer to King Louis XIV. There is a chateau named after Jean Baptiste Colbert in the aforementioned French town located on the Atlantic coast; it became a safe haven beginning in 1688.

Once in the New World, William Colbert ended up marrying the Chickasaw chief's eldest daughter in order to gain more influence in his trading of furs with the native tribes. It was from this union that the Colbert men started gaining prominence, especially since the next two generations married Chickasaw/Cherokee wives. They also became chiefs such as George Colbert ("Tootemastubbe") and Levi Colbert ("Itawamba Mingo").

== Geography ==
According to the United States Census Bureau, the town has a total area of 1.1 square miles (2.8 km^{2}), all land.

== Demographics ==
Historical population
Census	Pop.	Note	%±
1940	602		—
1950	748		24.3%
1960	671		−10.3%
1970	814		21.3%
1980	1,122		37.8%
1990	1,043		−7.0%
2000	1,065		2.1%
2010	1,140		7.0%
2020	1,027		−9.9%
U.S. Decennial Census

=== 2020 census ===
As of the 2020 census, Colbert had a population of 1,027. The median age was 45.8 years. 22.3% of residents were under the age of 18 and 23.0% of residents were 65 years of age or older. For every 100 females there were 85.0 males, and for every 100 females age 18 and over there were 79.3 males age 18 and over.

0.0% of residents lived in urban areas, while 100.0% lived in rural areas.

There were 423 households in Colbert, of which 31.2% had children under the age of 18 living in them. Of all households, 40.0% were married-couple households, 16.1% were households with a male householder and no spouse or partner present, and 34.5% were households with a female householder and no spouse or partner present. About 28.4% of all households were made up of individuals and 12.5% had someone living alone who was 65 years of age or older.

There were 460 housing units, of which 8.0% were vacant. The homeowner vacancy rate was 0.0% and the rental vacancy rate was 6.7%.

Racial composition as of the 2020 census
Race	Number	Percent
White	742	72.2%
Black or African American	91	8.9%
American Indian and Alaska Native	91	8.9%
Asian	0	0.0%
Native Hawaiian and Other Pacific Islander	1	0.1%
Some other race	22	2.1%
Two or more races	80	7.8%
Hispanic or Latino (of any race)	56	5.5%

=== 2000 census ===
As of the census of 2000, there were 1,065 people, 428 households, and 275 families residing in the town. The population density was 993.1 inhabitants per square mile (383.4/km^{2}). There were 493 housing units at an average density of 459.7 per square mile (177.5/km^{2}). The racial makeup of the town was 73.33% White, 17.18% African American, 4.51% Native American, 0.09% Asian, 0.28% from other races, and 4.60% from two or more races. Hispanic or Latino of any race were 1.60% of the population.

There were 428 households, out of which 26.2% had children under the age of 18 living with them, 44.6% were married couples living together, 11.7% had a female householder with no husband present, and 35.7% were non-families. 31.8% of all households were made up of individuals, and 15.9% had someone living alone who was 65 years of age or older. The average household size was 2.40 and the average family size was 3.00.

In the town, the population was spread out, with 23.0% under the age of 18, 9.3% from 18 to 24, 25.4% from 25 to 44, 22.6% from 45 to 64, and 19.7% who were 65 years of age or older. The median age was 39 years. For every 100 females, there were 84.6 males. For every 100 females age 18 and over, there were 77.1 males.

The median income for a household in the town was $26,304, and the median income for a family was $30,250. Males had a median income of $25,417 versus $15,962 for females. The per capita income for the town was $12,447. About 11.6% of families and 15.1% of the population were below the poverty line, including 15.5% of those under age 18 and 24.2% of those age 65 or over.

== Notable people ==
- Czarina Conlan
- Tony Goolsby

== See also ==
- George Colbert
- Levi Colbert
