= Louisiana Fixed Infantry Regiment =

Former infantry regiment of the Spanish Army

- Regimiento de Infantería Fijo de Luisiana
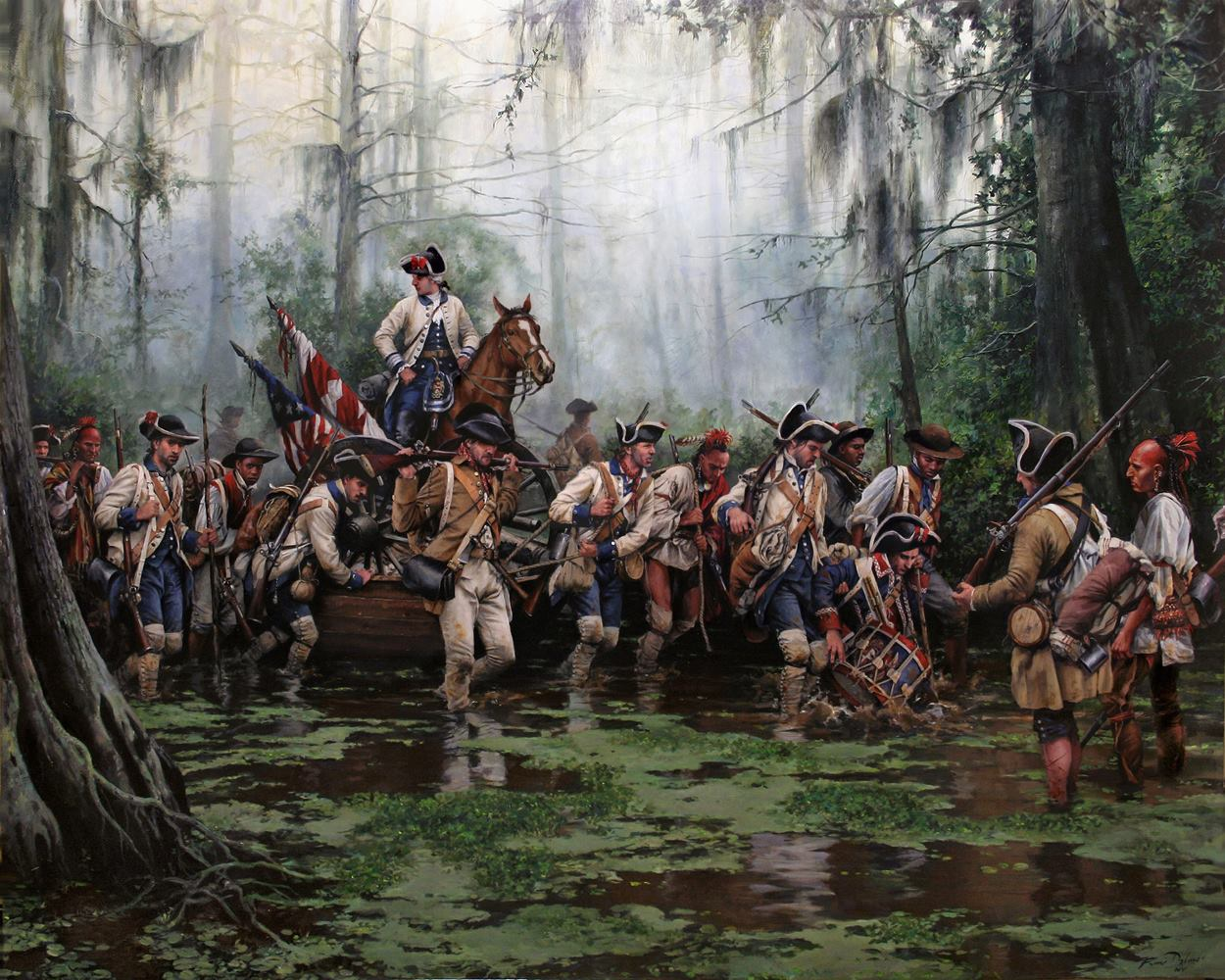
- La Marcha de Gálvez by Augusto Ferrer-Dalmau
- Active: 1769–1816
- Country: Spain
- Branch: Army
- Type: Infantry
- Size: Regiment
- Nickname: "Louisiana regiment"
- Motto: "Honor et fidélitas"
- Facings: Blue
- Battles: American Revolutionary War; Battle of Manchac Post; Battle of Baton Rouge; Battle of Fort Charlotte; Battle of St. Louis; Battle of Pensacola; Battle of Arkansas Post

Commanders
- Notable commanders: Don Bernardo de Gálvez; Don Francisco Bouligny; Don Francisco San Maxent

The Louisiana Fixed Infantry Regiment (Spanish: Regimiento de Infantería Fijo de Luisiana), commonly known as the "Louisiana regiment" (Spanish: Regimiento de la Luisiana), was an infantry formation of the Spanish Army in the Southern and Western theaters of the American Revolutionary War.

== History ==
Formed in 1769 as the Louisiana Fixed Infantry Battalion, with Headquarters at New Orleans, Louisiana, the battalion was reorganized and redesignated in 1782 as the Louisiana Fixed Infantry Regiment to consist of two battalions. Reorganized again in 1785 to consist of three battalions, the Louisiana Fixed Infantry Regiment was disbanded in 1816 in West Florida.
