= Sidney E. King =

American painter and illustrator (1906–2002)

- Born: Sidney Eugene King; August 22, 1906; Boston, Massachusetts, U.S.
- Died: April 24, 2002 (aged 95); Caroline County, Virginia, U.S.
- Resting place: Bethlehem Baptist Church Cemetery, Essex County, Virginia, U.S.
- Education: Boston Museum of Fine Arts; Vesper George School of Art; Copley School of Art; Federal School of Minneapolis; Massachusetts School of Normal Art
- Known for: Painting; illustration
- Spouse: Ena Taylor

Sidney Eugene King (August 22, 1906 — April 24, 2002) was an American painter and illustrator.

== Life ==
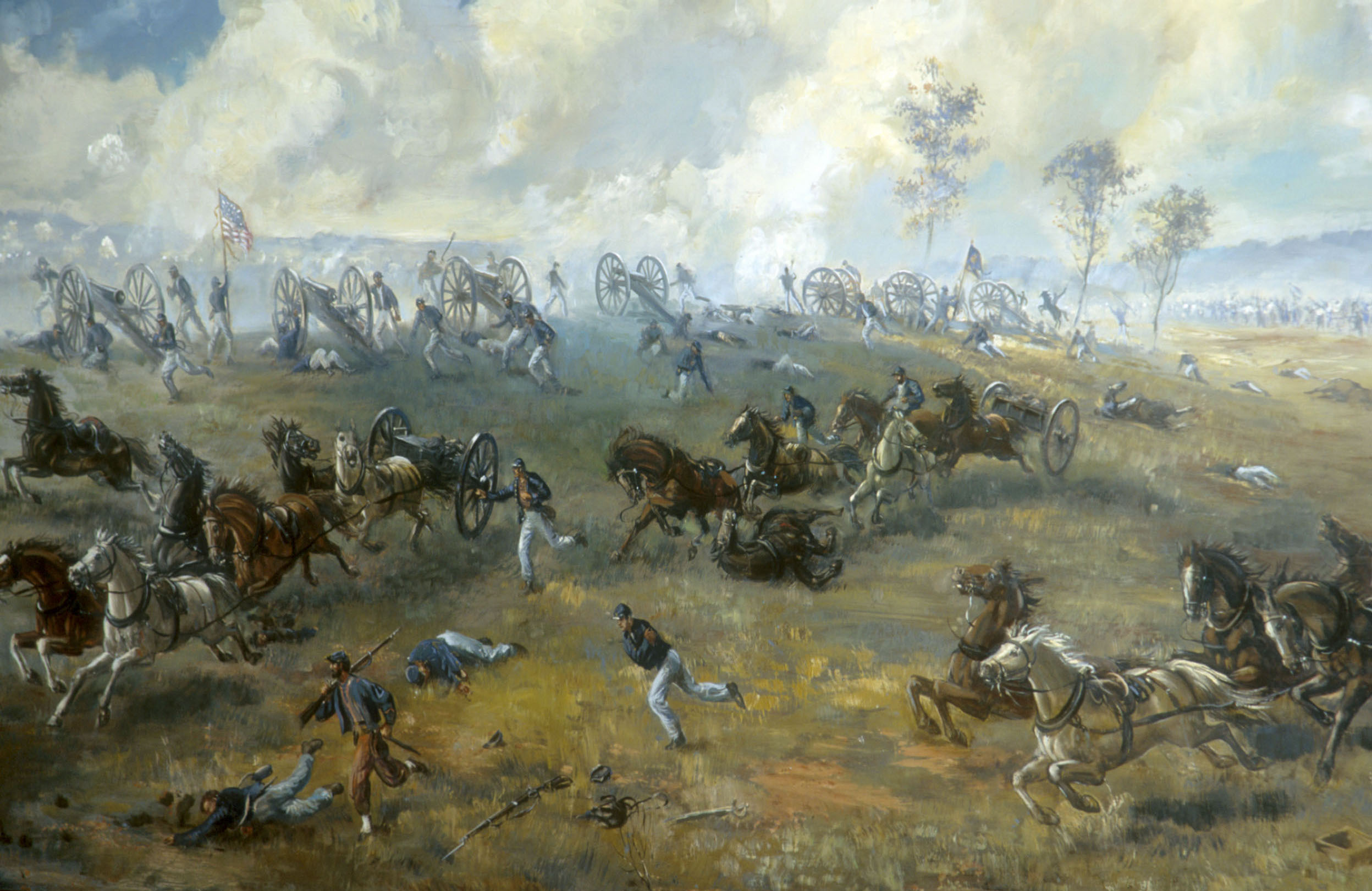
Capture of Ricketts' Battery (1964)

King was educated at the Boston Museum of Fine Arts, the Vesper George School of Art, the Copley School of Art, Federal School of Minneapolis, and Massachusetts School of Normal Art. King was the first artist to introduce oil paintings in an outdoor environment for the National Park Service. His works can be seen in most national parks east of the Mississippi River and at the Virginia Baptist Historical Society at the University of Richmond.

== Legacy ==
On September 28, 2013, The Sidney E. King Arts Center opened in Bowling Green, Virginia.
