= George Colbert =

Chief of the Chickasaw Nation from 1834 to 1839

- Tootemastubbe
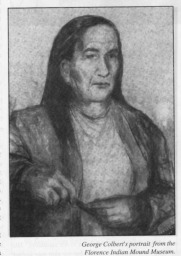
- Colbert, c. 1830

Chickasaw leader
- In office 1834–1839
- Preceded by: Levi Colbert

Personal details
- Born: c. 1764 Chickasaw Nation (present-day Alabama)
- Died: November 7, 1839 (aged 74–75) Fort Towson, Indian Territory
- Resting place: Choctaw County, Oklahoma
- Relations: Levi Colbert (brother); Holmes Colbert (nephew)
- Parent: James Colbert (father)
- Military service
- Service years: 1814–1815
- Rank: Captain
- Units: Major Blue's Detachment, Chickasaw Indians
- Wars: War of 1812

George Colbert (Chickasaw: Tootemastubbe; c. 1764 – November 7, 1839) was an early 19th-century Chickasaw leader who commanded 350 Chickasaw auxiliary troops who fought under Major General Andrew Jackson during the Creek War. He also served as an officer in Major Blue's Detachment of Chickasaw Indians during the later part of the War of 1812.

Colbert temporarily became principal chief of the Chickasaw, succeeding his older brother Levi who died in 1834. A planter who owned significant cotton lands and numerous slaves in Mississippi, he operated a ferry across the Tennessee in northwest Alabama. In 1834, he signed the treaty that finalized the tribe's removal.

== Early life and military service ==
George Colbert was born around 1764 in the Chickasaw Nation (present-day Alabama). He was the second of six sons of James Colbert (c. 1720–1784), a British trader, and his second wife Minta Hoye, a Chickasaw woman. The tribe practiced matrilineal kinship, and all children were considered to be born into their mother's family and clan, and gained their status from her. Property and positions of hereditary leadership were passed through the mother's line. Minta Hoye's clan was one from which hereditary chiefs were drawn. As a youth George Colbert began to rise in prominence among the Chickasaw, as he also gained status by his bravery in battle and other actions.

Colbert was said to serve with American troops under Arthur St. Clair in 1791 and Anthony Wayne in 1794 during the Northwest Indian Wars. During the Creek War, he recruited 350 Chickasaw warriors and assisted Andrew Jackson against the Red Sticks, the more conservative portion of the people. During the later part of the War of 1812, he served as an officer in Major Blue's Detachment of Chickasaw Indians.

== Career ==
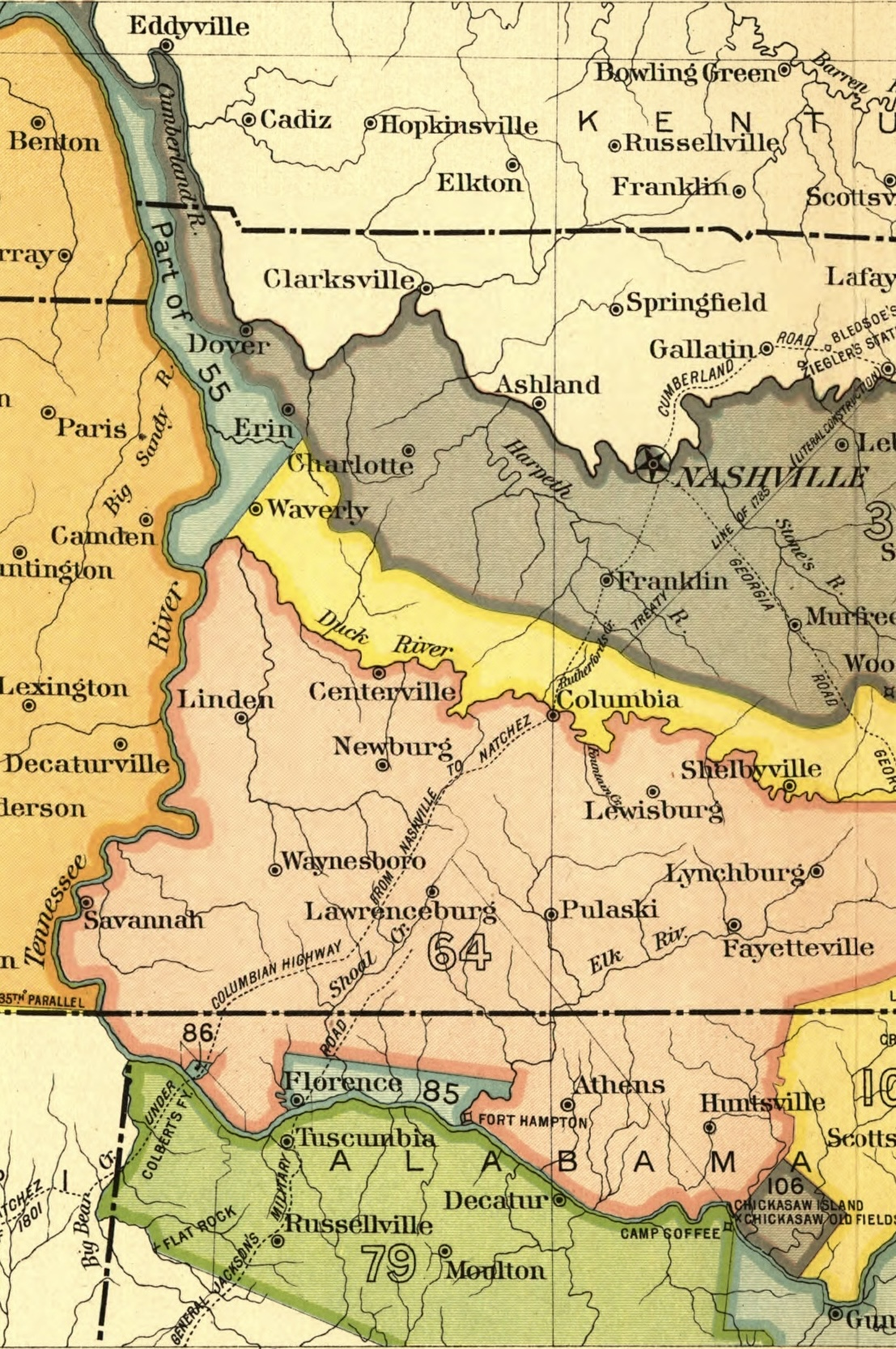
Nashville to the Tennessee River, showing location of Colbert's ferry, from Indian land cessions in the United States (1898)

By the early 1800s, Colbert established Colbert's Ferry near Cherokee, Alabama. It was a significant crossing of the Tennessee River along the Natchez Trace, an important trade route. On June 23, during the Creek War, he was paid "for two beeves, $32; two bushels salt, $6; ferriage for 600 men and horses, $150." He was the commander of 350 Chickasaws who fought for Andrew Jackson at the Battle of Horseshoe Bend against the Red Stick Creeks.

He acquired land and became an influential cotton planter; he also raised livestock and was a trader. Due to his clan, he was eligible for the position of Chief. The Chickasaw communally owned an estimated 150 slaves as labor on their lands, as was custom with many intercultural tribes in the region. In April 1823 Colbert placed a runaway slave ad seeking the recovery of Trouble, Philip, and July. Trouble was 55 years old and an African by birth; Philip was "an excellent hunter," and both he and July were "raised by" Colbert, meaning they grew up in his household. Philip and July were bilingual Chickasaw and English speakers.

A few slaves escaped during the confusion of the eventual removal.

Colbert and his brothers, Levi and James, were among the primary negotiators between his people and the United States government in the early 19th century. The Chickasaw ended up ceding much of their land to the United States after Levi died en route to Washington D.C during negotiations in 1834. Having grown up with both Chickasaw and "white" language and culture, the Colbert brothers were strongly relied upon to act on the tribe's behalf. After Levi died, their negotiations abruptly ceased. In 1834, most of the Chickasaw joined members of other Southeast tribes in forced removal to Indian Territory west of the Mississippi River. This removal became known among the Indians as the Trail of Tears.

Before removal, Colbert served again temporarily as chief of the Chickasaw. The year 1834 was the beginning of the forced removal process, accomplished by overland march and travel by rivers. Most of it took place in the later 1830s. Tishomingo became chief of the Chickasaw when they started on the trail and led the people until his death in 1838 en route, near the Arkansas River. Neither he nor Colbert, who died en route in 1839 at age 75, reached the new Chickasaw territory. He died near Fort Towson, Indian Territory, just before the people reached their new lands.

== Personal life ==
Colbert married two times. The women were sisters from the Wind Clan Cherokee; their father was Chief Doublehead. Colbert first married Tuskiahooto. When she proved to be barren, he also married Saleechie, the younger sister. (The Chickasaw allowed the men in the tribe to marry multiple wives, per tribal law). Colbert fathered a total of six sons and two daughters. He never reached the Chickasaw section of Oka Homa.

== Honors ==
- Colbert County, Alabama, is named after both him and his brother Levi.
