= Levi Colbert =

19th-century Chickasaw leader

- Itawamba Mingo

Chickasaw leader
- Succeeded by: George Colbert

Personal details
- Born: c. 1759 Chickasaw Nation (present-day Alabama)
- Died: June 2, 1834 (aged 74–75) Buzzard Roost, Alabama
- Resting place: Oakwood Cemetery, Tuscumbia, Alabama
- Relations: George Colbert (brother); Holmes Colbert (nephew)
- Children: 13
- Parent: James Colbert (father)
- Nickname: Okolona (Calm or Peaceful)
- Military service
- Rank: Major
- Battles: Indian Wars; Creek War

Levi Colbert (Chickasaw: Itawamba Mingo; c. 1759 – June 2, 1834) was an early 19th-century Chickasaw leader and the namesake of Itawamba County, Mississippi.

== Early life and education ==
Levi Colbert was born around 1759 in the Chickasaw Nation (present-day Alabama). He was the first of six sons of James Colbert (c. 1720–1784), a British trader, and his second wife Minta Hoye, a Chickasaw woman. As the Chickasaw had a matrilineal kinship system of descent and inheritance, children were considered to belong to the mother's clan. They gained their status through her, and hereditary leadership for males was passed through the maternal line. Colbert attended Charity Hall School.

When Colbert assumed the hereditary title of head chief of the Chickasaw Nation, he was living on the bluff west of the Chickasaw trading post known as Cotton Gin Port, established near the old cotton gin. The post was marked by a large spreading oak known as the council tree.

== Career ==
Levi Colbert and his brother George were prominent among the negotiators for the Chickasaw when they met with government officials related to treaties and removal. A written report given to the Senate on January 15, 1827 noted that commissioners assigned to negotiate a treaty with the Chickasaw Nation had met in parley on November 1, 1826 with members of that tribe. It reported that Colbert, on behalf of agents of that nation, said that "there was not a man in the nation who would consent to sell either the whole or part of their lands."

Although opposed to the Indian Removal Act of 1830, the Chickasaw chiefs of the council signed a treaty, based on the tribe's removal, in a treaty meeting with General John Coffee and other United States representatives in November 1832. They wanted to keep peace, and they were suffering from the aggressive and hostile behavior of the Mississippi state government, as well as white settlers in their territory. Their removal was to west of the Mississippi River to Indian Territory. This treaty promised 25 cents per acre for their land, less than half of what the government had initially promised.

In a long letter to President Andrew Jackson in November 1832, Colbert noted the many complaints the chiefs had with the resulting Treaty of Pontotoc Creek. He restated their position, and noted their belief that General Coffee had ignored their comments and viewpoints. They had wanted the tribe to keep control of the money resulting from sale of their lands, they were not ready to choose land in Indian Territory, they did not want to share a reservation in Indian Territory with "half breeds" (mixed-race persons they did not consider members of their people), and they were dismayed at the way they had been treated by General Coffee. More than 40 chiefs who had attended the treaty council signed the letter with Colbert. They were chiefs of the clans and leading villages. He had been ill during the meeting and was unable to attend all the sessions.

== Death ==
Colbert died June 2, 1834, at Buzzard Roost, Alabama. His brother George Colbert succeeded him as leader of the Chickasaw.

== Personal life ==
Colbert "married three times. He married Ishtimmarharlechar. She was listed as a resident in the census report in Chickasaw Roll, Chickasaw Nation, MS, 1818. He married Temusharhoctay 'Dollie' (Schtimmarshashoctay) before 1795. Temusharhoctay was born before 1780. She was listed as a resident in the census report in Chickasaw Nation, MS, 1818. He married Mintahoyo House of Imatapo before 1799. Mintahoyo was born before 1799. Mintahoyo died after 1839." Most of the younger children were educated at Charity Hall school, a mile and a half from their home, (also called Bell Indian Mission). It has been described as "a mission school ... established in 1820, near Cotton Gin Port, Mississippi, by Rev. Robert Bell, under the auspices of the Cumberland Presbyterian Church, for the education of Chickasaw children."

In 1801 he lived near Bear Creek, between the Tennessee and Tombigbee Rivers. He was said to be "amiable and generous," in contrast to the more "determined and dictatorial" George Colbert.

== Legacy ==
Some of Colbert's goals were achieved in a treaty of 1837, which enabled the tribe to control monies resulting from the sale of their homesteads and ensured they would be compensated for improvements. Colbert did not want conflict; he wanted peace with the US government, even if it meant giving up his people's land. He wanted to try to preserve his people's rights during negotiations, as they were pressured by increasing conflict with encroaching European-American settlers and governments.

Colbert was very concerned that the federal government was treating equally with mixed-race men he called "half-breeds." Although he was of mixed descent, he had grown up identifying with the Chickasaw culture and his mother's clan. He believed some white men were marrying into the tribe just to try to get control of land. By the 1830s, he felt such men were ignoring traditional practices and the tribe's recognized chiefs in seeking personal gain.

== Honors ==
Itawamba County, Mississippi, is named after him. Colbert County, Alabama, is named after both him and his brother George.
