= Colbert County, Alabama =

County in Alabama, United States

- County
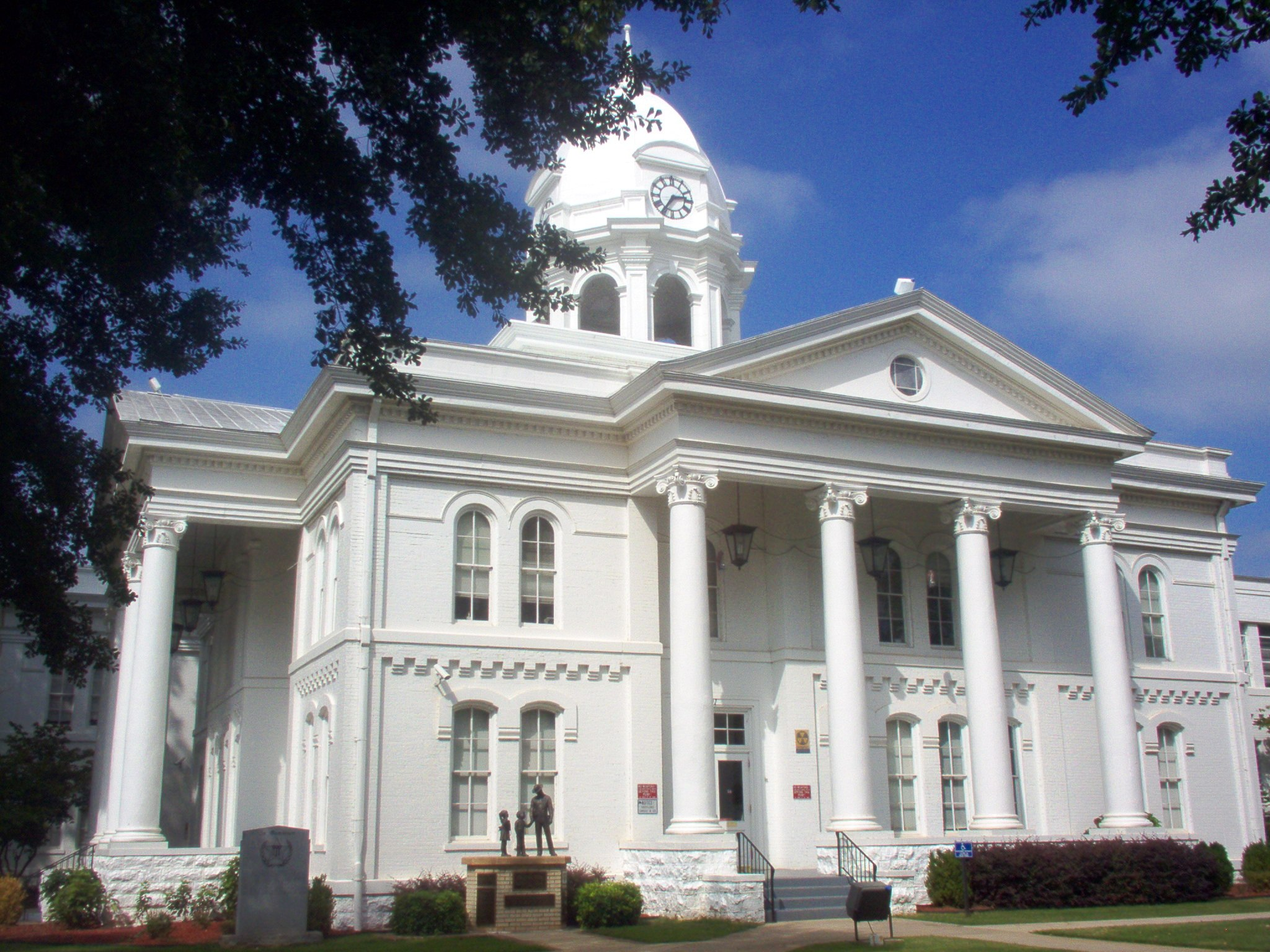
- The Colbert County Courthouse in Tuscumbia

- Location within the U.S. state of Alabama
- Coordinates: 34°40′36″N 87°49′02″W
- Country: United States
- State: Alabama
- Founded: February 6, 1867
- Named for: George and Levi Colbert
- Seat: Tuscumbia
- Largest city: Muscle Shoals

Area
  - Total: 622 sq mi (1,610 km^{2})
  - Land: 593 sq mi (1,540 km^{2})
  - Water: 30 sq mi (78 km^{2}) 4.7%

Population (2020)
  - Total: 57,227
  - Estimate (2025): 59,474 ▲
  - Density: 96.5/sq mi (37.3/km^{2})
- Time zone: UTC−6 (Central)
  - Summer (DST): UTC−5 (CDT)
- Congressional district: 4th
- Website: www.colbertcounty.org
- County Number 20 on Alabama Licence Plates

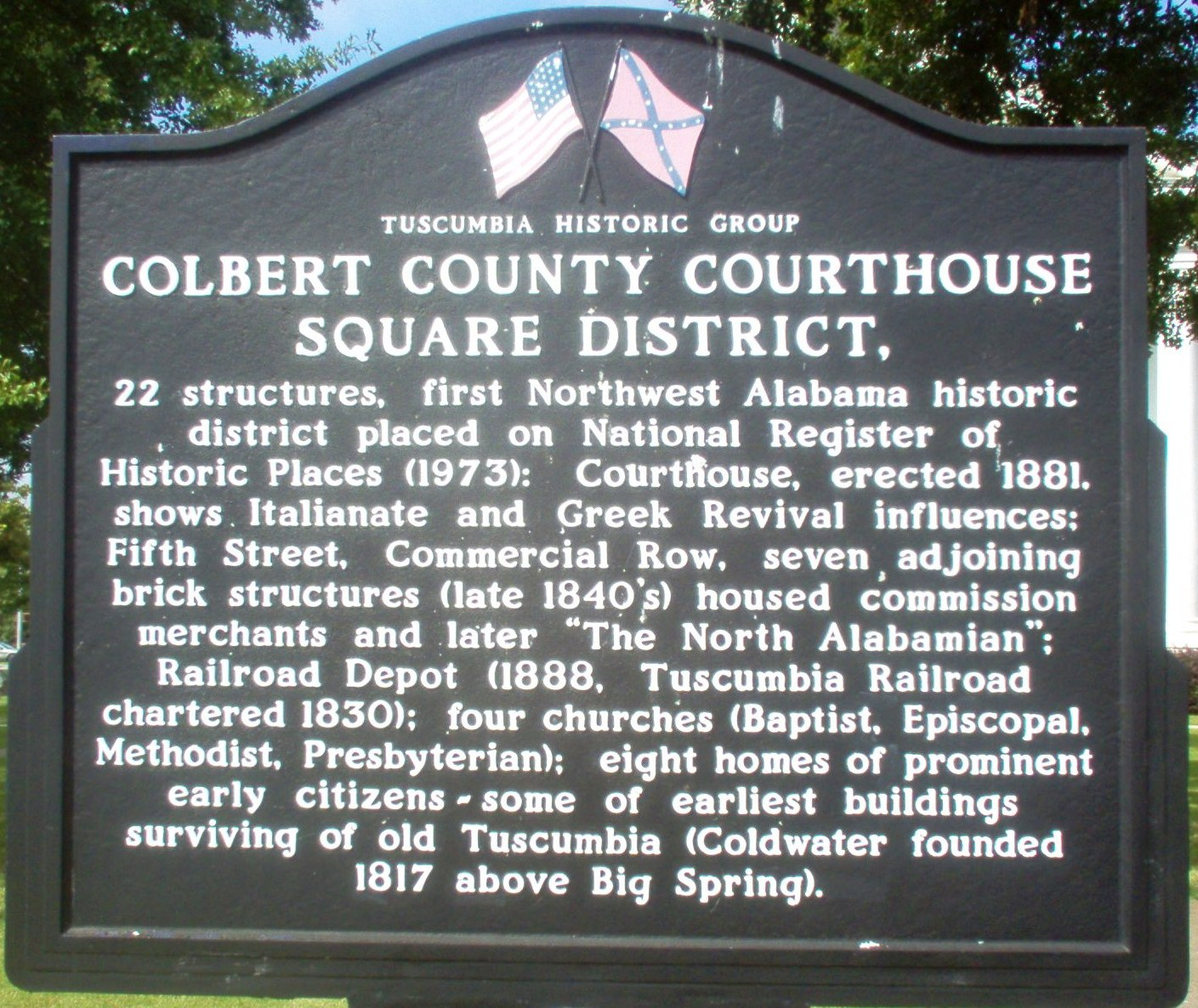
Colbert County Courthouse Square District Historic Marker, September 2007

Colbert County (/ˈkɒlbərt/) is a county located in the northwestern part of the U.S. state of Alabama. As of the 2020 census the county's population was 57,227. The county seat is Tuscumbia. The largest city is Muscle Shoals.

The county is named in honor of brothers George and Levi Colbert, who were Chickasaw chiefs in the early 19th century in this territory. Ultimately the federal government forced the removal of most of the Chickasaw and other historic tribes from the Southeast.

Colbert County is part of the Florence–Muscle Shoals, AL metropolitan statistical area, also known as "The Shoals".

== History ==
The Chickasaw and Cherokee peoples are the earliest known inhabitants of Colbert County, an area that was part of their territories for hundreds of years. Before they emerged, there were earlier cultures of indigenous peoples who established settlements and seasonal villages for thousands of years in the area.

In the 1810s, settlers began to settle in an area at a crossroads that developed as Leighton, Alabama. Colbert County was originally established during the Reconstruction era after the American Civil War on February 6, 1867. The state legislature split it from Franklin County over political issues. It was abolished eight months later on November 29, 1867 by an Alabama constitutional convention. The general assembly on December 29, 1869 authorized an election to determine if the former county residents wanted their county restored. A vote then took place on January 6, 1870. The county was then reestablished by the legislature on February 24, 1870.

In 1890, the eastern boundary of Colbert County was changed from County Line Road to Town Creek; this resulted in all of the town of Leighton placed within Colbert County.

Colbert County is the location of Ivy Green, the birthplace of noted author and activist Helen Keller. Colbert County includes the cities of Sheffield and Muscle Shoals, where many popular American and British musicians, such as Aretha Franklin and the Rolling Stones, respectively, recorded music.

Also located in Colbert County is the Key Underwood Coon Dog Memorial Graveyard established in 1937. Coon dogs were bred and trained for hunting in this region.

== Geography ==
According to the United States Census Bureau, the county has a total area of 622 square miles (1,610 km^{2}), of which 593 square miles (1,540 km^{2}) is land and 30 square miles (78 km^{2}) (4.7%) is water. The county's elevation ranges from 410 feet at the Tennessee River in northwestern Colbert County to 980 feet in southeastern Colbert County at the broadcast facility's tower of WQPR-FM/WFIQ-TV.

=== National protected area ===
- Natchez Trace Parkway (part)

=== River ===
- Tennessee River

=== Major creeks ===
- Bear Creek
- Cane Creek
- Mulberry Creek
- Spring Creek
- Town Creek

=== Waterfalls ===
- Cane Creek Canyon Waterfall
- Rainbow Branch Waterfall
- Wilson Dam Waterfall

=== Notable springs ===
- Big Spring at Tuscumbia
- Buzzard Roost Spring at Margerum
- Chalybeate Spring at Littleville
- Milk Springs at Colbert Heights
- Shegog Spring at Ford City

=== Notable mountains ===
- Bald Knob
- Coburn Mountain
- Colbert Mountain
- Hawk Pride Mountain
- LaGrange Mountain
- Mountain Mills Ridge
- Sand Mountain
- Underwood Mountain
- Wagnon Mountain
- Wheeler Mountain

=== Adjacent counties ===
- Lauderdale County, Alabama – north
- Lawrence County, Alabama – southeast
- Franklin County, Alabama – south
- Tishomingo County, Mississippi – west

== Transportation ==
=== Major highways ===
- U.S. Highway 43 / State Route 13 (unsigned) / State Route 17
- U.S. Highway 72 / State Route 2 (unsigned)
  - US 72 Alt.
- State Route 20
- State Route 133
- State Route 157
- State Route 184
- State Route 247
- Natchez Trace Parkway

=== Rail ===
- Norfolk Southern Railway – freight lines going south, east, and west.

=== Airports ===
- Big River Airpark
- Northwest Alabama Regional Airport

== Demographics ==
Historical population
Census	Pop.	Note	%±
1870	12,537		—
1880	16,153		28.8%
1890	20,189		25.0%
1900	22,341		10.7%
1910	24,802		11.0%
1920	31,997		29.0%
1930	29,860		−6.7%
1940	34,093		14.2%
1950	39,561		16.0%
1960	46,506		17.6%
1970	49,632		6.7%
1980	54,519		9.8%
1990	51,666		−5.2%
2000	54,984		6.4%
2010	54,428		−1.0%
2020	57,227		5.1%
2025 (est.)	59,474	▲	3.9%
U.S. Decennial Census; 1790-1960 1900-1990; 1990-2000 2010-2020

=== 2020 census ===
As of the 2020 census, the county had a population of 57,227. The median age was 42.6 years. 21.2% of residents were under the age of 18 and 19.9% of residents were 65 years of age or older. For every 100 females there were 92.0 males, and for every 100 females age 18 and over there were 88.8 males age 18 and over.

The racial makeup of the county was 76.2% White, 16.2% Black or African American, 0.5% American Indian and Alaska Native, 0.8% Asian, 0.0% Native Hawaiian and Pacific Islander, 1.6% from some other race, and 4.7% from two or more races. Hispanic or Latino residents of any race comprised 3.0% of the population.

59.7% of residents lived in urban areas, while 40.3% lived in rural areas.

There were 24,425 households in the county, of which 27.8% had children under the age of 18 living with them and 31.2% had a female householder with no spouse or partner present. About 30.8% of all households were made up of individuals and 13.8% had someone living alone who was 65 years of age or older.

There were 27,666 housing units, of which 11.7% were vacant. Among occupied housing units, 69.1% were owner-occupied and 30.9% were renter-occupied. The homeowner vacancy rate was 2.0% and the rental vacancy rate was 7.7%.

=== Racial and ethnic composition ===
Colbert County, Alabama – Racial and ethnic composition Note: the US Census treats Hispanic/Latino as an ethnic category. This table excludes Latinos from the racial categories and assigns them to a separate category. Hispanics/Latinos may be of any race.
Race / ethnicity (NH = Non-Hispanic)	Pop 2000	Pop 2010	Pop 2020	% 2000	% 2010	% 2020
White alone (NH)	44,470	43,334	43,241	80.88%	79.62%	75.56%
Black or African American alone (NH)	9,096	8,702	9,222	16.54%	15.99%	16.11%
Native American or Alaska Native alone (NH)	195	262	222	0.35%	0.48%	0.39%
Asian alone (NH)	127	224	432	0.23%	0.41%	0.75%
Pacific Islander alone (NH)	11	14	9	0.02%	0.03%	0.02%
Other race alone (NH)	30	35	135	0.05%	0.06%	0.24%
Mixed race or Multiracial (NH)	437	764	2,233	0.79%	1.40%	3.90%
Hispanic or Latino (any race)	618	1,093	1,732	1.12%	2.01%	3.03%
Total	54,984	54,428	57,227	100.00%	100.00%	100.00%

=== 2010 census ===
According to the 2010 United States census Bureau:

There were 22,461 households, out of which 30.50% had children under the age of 18 living with them, 56.00% were married couples living together, 12.10% had a female householder with no husband present, and 28.60% were non-families. 26.10% of all households were made up of individuals, and 11.50% had someone living alone who was 65 years of age or older. The average household size was 2.42 and the average family size was 2.92.

In the county, the population was spread out, with 23.80% under the age of 18, 8.10% from 18 to 24, 27.80% from 25 to 44, 24.90% from 45 to 64, and 15.40% who were 65 years of age or older. The median age was 39 years. For every 100 females, there were 91.80 males. For every 100 females age 18 and over, there were 88.10 males.

The median income for a household in the county was $31,954, and the median income for a family was $39,294. Males had a median income of $32,112 versus $20,107 for females. The per capita income for the county was $17,533. About 11.10% of families and 14.00% of the population were below the poverty line, including 18.40% of those under age 18 and 11.90% of those age 65 or over.

=== 2000 census ===
As of the census of 2000, there were 54,984 people, 22,461 households, and 16,037 families residing in the county. The population density was 92 people per square mile (36 people/km^{2}). There were 24,980 housing units at an average density of 42 units per square mile (16 units/km^{2}). The racial makeup of the county was 78.52% White or European American (non-Hispanic), 16.62% Black or African American, 0.37% Native American, 0.24% Asian, 0.02% Pacific Islander, 0.34% from other races, and 0.89% from two or more races. 1.12% of the population were Hispanic or Latino of any race.

== Politics ==
Although historically a Democratic stronghold, Colbert County is now heavily Republican. The last Democrat to carry the county in a presidential election was Al Gore, who won its votes with a narrow 49% plurality.

United States presidential election results for Colbert County, Alabama
Year	Republican		Democratic		Third party(ies)	
Year	No.	%	No.	%	No.	%
1872	856	45.95%	1,007	54.05%	0	0.00%
1876	778	36.02%	1,382	63.98%	0	0.00%
1880	1,072	43.30%	1,237	49.96%	167	6.74%
1884	1,200	51.59%	1,094	47.03%	32	1.38%
1888	1,315	50.65%	1,274	49.08%	7	0.27%
1892	0	0.00%	1,960	56.48%	1,510	43.52%
1896	1,754	49.84%	1,658	47.12%	107	3.04%
1900	1,243	42.79%	1,542	53.08%	120	4.13%
1904	203	17.47%	936	80.55%	23	1.98%
1908	353	27.88%	849	67.06%	64	5.06%
1912	228	15.25%	946	63.28%	321	21.47%
1916	352	23.02%	1,132	74.04%	45	2.94%
1920	650	25.18%	1,869	72.41%	62	2.40%
1924	576	25.29%	1,503	65.98%	199	8.74%
1928	1,249	31.64%	2,596	65.75%	103	2.61%
1932	312	9.62%	2,908	89.64%	24	0.74%
1936	251	6.92%	3,365	92.75%	12	0.33%
1940	365	8.35%	3,998	91.47%	8	0.18%
1944	496	12.75%	3,386	87.07%	7	0.18%
1948	488	15.62%	0	0.00%	2,637	84.38%
1952	1,381	18.90%	5,920	81.01%	7	0.10%
1956	1,819	20.35%	7,007	78.40%	111	1.24%
1960	2,815	26.79%	7,550	71.85%	143	1.36%
1964	5,267	48.59%	0	0.00%	5,573	51.41%
1968	1,727	11.06%	2,291	14.67%	11,603	74.28%
1972	11,215	67.71%	4,811	29.04%	538	3.25%
1976	4,471	26.55%	11,996	71.23%	375	2.23%
1980	6,619	33.07%	12,550	62.71%	844	4.22%
1984	9,530	45.31%	11,008	52.34%	494	2.35%
1988	7,775	42.25%	10,397	56.49%	232	1.26%
1992	8,073	35.98%	12,206	54.40%	2,160	9.63%
1996	8,305	40.88%	10,226	50.33%	1,787	8.80%
2000	10,518	48.85%	10,543	48.96%	471	2.19%
2004	13,188	55.10%	10,598	44.28%	149	0.62%
2008	14,739	59.33%	9,703	39.06%	401	1.61%
2012	13,936	59.44%	9,166	39.10%	342	1.46%
2016	16,746	67.21%	7,312	29.35%	857	3.44%
2020	19,203	68.86%	8,343	29.92%	340	1.22%
2024	19,714	72.58%	7,137	26.28%	309	1.14%

United States Senate election results for Colbert County, Alabama2
Year	Republican		Democratic		Third party(ies)	
Year	No.	%	No.	%	No.	%
2020	18,320	65.94%	9,408	33.86%	53	0.19%

United States Senate election results for Colbert County, Alabama3
Year	Republican		Democratic		Third party(ies)	
Year	No.	%	No.	%	No.	%
2022	12,748	73.88%	4,181	24.23%	327	1.89%

Alabama Gubernatorial election results for Colbert County
Year	Republican		Democratic		Third party(ies)	
Year	No.	%	No.	%	No.	%
2022	13,001	75.26%	3,739	21.65%	534	3.09%

== Communities ==
=== Cities ===
- Muscle Shoals
- Sheffield
- Tuscumbia (county seat)

=== Towns ===
- Cherokee
- Leighton
- Littleville

=== Unincorporated communities ===
- Allsboro
- Barton
- Buzzard Roost
- Ford City
- Hatton
- Listerhill
- Maud
- Mountain Mills
- Nitrate City
- Pride
- Spring Valley
- Village Number 1

== Education ==
=== Colleges ===
- Northwest Shoals Community College

=== School districts ===
The following school districts are in the county:

- Colbert County Schools
- Muscle Shoals City School District
- Sheffield City Schools
- Tuscumbia City Schools

==== Colbert County School System ====
- Cherokee Elementary School
- Cherokee High School
- Colbert County High School
- Colbert Heights Elementary School
- Colbert Heights High School
- Hatton Elementary School
- Leighton Elementary School
- New Bethel Elementary School

==== Muscle Shoals City School System ====
- Muscle Shoals High School
- Muscle Shoals Middle School
- Muscle Shoals Career Academy
- Highland Park Elementary School
- Howell Graves Preschool
- McBride Elementary School
- Webster Elementary School

==== Sheffield City School System ====
- Sheffield High School
- Sheffield Junior High School
- L.E. Wilson Elementary School
- W.A. Threadgill Primary School

==== Tuscumbia City School System ====
- Deshler High School
- Deshler Middle School
- Deshler Career Technical Center
- G.W. Trenholm Primary School
- R.E. Thompson Intermediate School

== Parks and recreation ==
- Alabama Wildlife Refuge Area at Pleasant Site
- Avalon Park, Tuscumbia
- Buzzard Roost Park, Margerum
- Colbert County Park, Pride and Margerum
- Highland Park, Tuscumbia
- John W. Gattman Park, Muscle Shoals
- Colbert Ferry Park, Cherokee
- North Alabama State Fair Park, Tuscumbia
- Park West, Tuscumbia
- Rivermont Park on the Tennessee River, Tuscumbia
- Rosetrail Park, Margerum
- Spring Park, Tuscumbia
- Tenth Avenue Park, Sheffield
- Thomas State Wildlife Refuge, Barton
- York Terrace Park, Sheffield

== Historical sites and attractions ==
- Alabama Music Hall of Fame, Tuscumbia
- Barton Hall, Cherokee – National Historic Landmarks
- Belle Mont Mansion/Plantation
- Cane Creek Canyon and Natural Preserve
- Colbert County Courthouse Square Historic District, Tuscumbia
- Coon Dog Memorial Graveyard of Key-Underwood, Cherokee
- F.A.M.E. Recording Studios, Muscle Shoals
- Ivy Green – Birthplace of Helen Keller, Tuscumbia
- LaGrange College Site and Monument, Leighton
- Natchez Trace Parkway
- Nitrate Village Number 1 Historic District, Sheffield
- Old Railroad Bridge of 1839 on the Tennessee River
- Rosenwald School site, Cherokee
- Tennessee Valley Art Museum, Tuscumbia
- Tuscumbia Railroad Depot Museum
- TVA Walking Trails and Recreation Area
- Wilson Lock and Dam, Muscle Shoals

See also:

- National Register of Historic Places listings in Colbert County, Alabama
- Properties on the Alabama Register of Landmarks and Heritage in Colbert County, Alabama

== Annual events ==
- Belle Mont Celtic Fest – May
- Muscle Shoals Area Street Rods Car Show Festival – May
- Recall LaGrange Commemorations – May
- North Alabama African Heritage Festival – June
- Leighton Juneteenth Celebration – June
- Helen Keller Festival – June
- W.C. Handy Music Festival – July
- Coon Dog Labor Day Celebration – September
- "Oka Kapassa" – Return to Cold Water American Indian Festival – September
- Annual Christmas Parades of Muscle Shoals, Tuscumbia, Sheffield – December

== In popular culture ==
- Colbert County was featured in a three-part comedy feature on Comedy Central's The Colbert Report from November 28–30, 2006.
- Colbert County is the setting for the Drive-by Truckers song, "Putting People on the Moon"

== Notable people ==
- Arthur Alexander
- Jason Allen – American football
- Beverly Barton
- Lefty Bates
- Deion Belue
- Boyd Bennett
- Robert Byrne – songwriter
- Marcel Black
- Archibald Hill Carmichael
- Pete Carr
- Amanda Chase
- George Colbert
- Levi Colbert
- Mike Cooley (musician)
- Dominique Croom
- Ben Cunningham (activist)
- Rece Davis
- Bobby E. Denton
- James Deshler
- Leon Douglas
- Cecil Dowdy
- Alecia Elliott
- Henry S. Foote
- Douglas A. Foster
- Al Gamble
- Wayne Greenhaw
- Wendell Wilkie Gunn
- Rick Hall
- Howell Heflin
- Kelvin Holly
- Dennis Homan
- David Hood
- Patterson Hood
- Jimmy Hughes
- Richard H. Jackson
- Rick James (baseball)
- Jimmy Johnson (session guitarist)
- Helen Keller
- John W. Keys
- Adam Lazzara
- Maud McKnight Lindsay
- Robert B. Lindsay
- Frank Manush
- Heinie Manush
- Guy Morton
- Alfred Huger Moses
- Stan Munsey
- Ozzie Newsome
- Gary Nichols
- Margaret Pellegrini
- Anthony Piccione
- Will Reynolds
- Willie Ruff
- Wimp Sanderson
- William Henry Sawtelle
- Mark Sears
- Herschel Sizemore
- Joseph Humphrey Sloss
- William H. Steele
- Phillip Swann
- Percy Sledge
- Leigh Tiffin
- Chris Tompkins
- Fred Thompson
- Wilson D. Watson
- Ed West
- John Paul White
- William Willis
