= Hurricane Danny (1985) =

Category 1 Atlantic hurricane in 1985

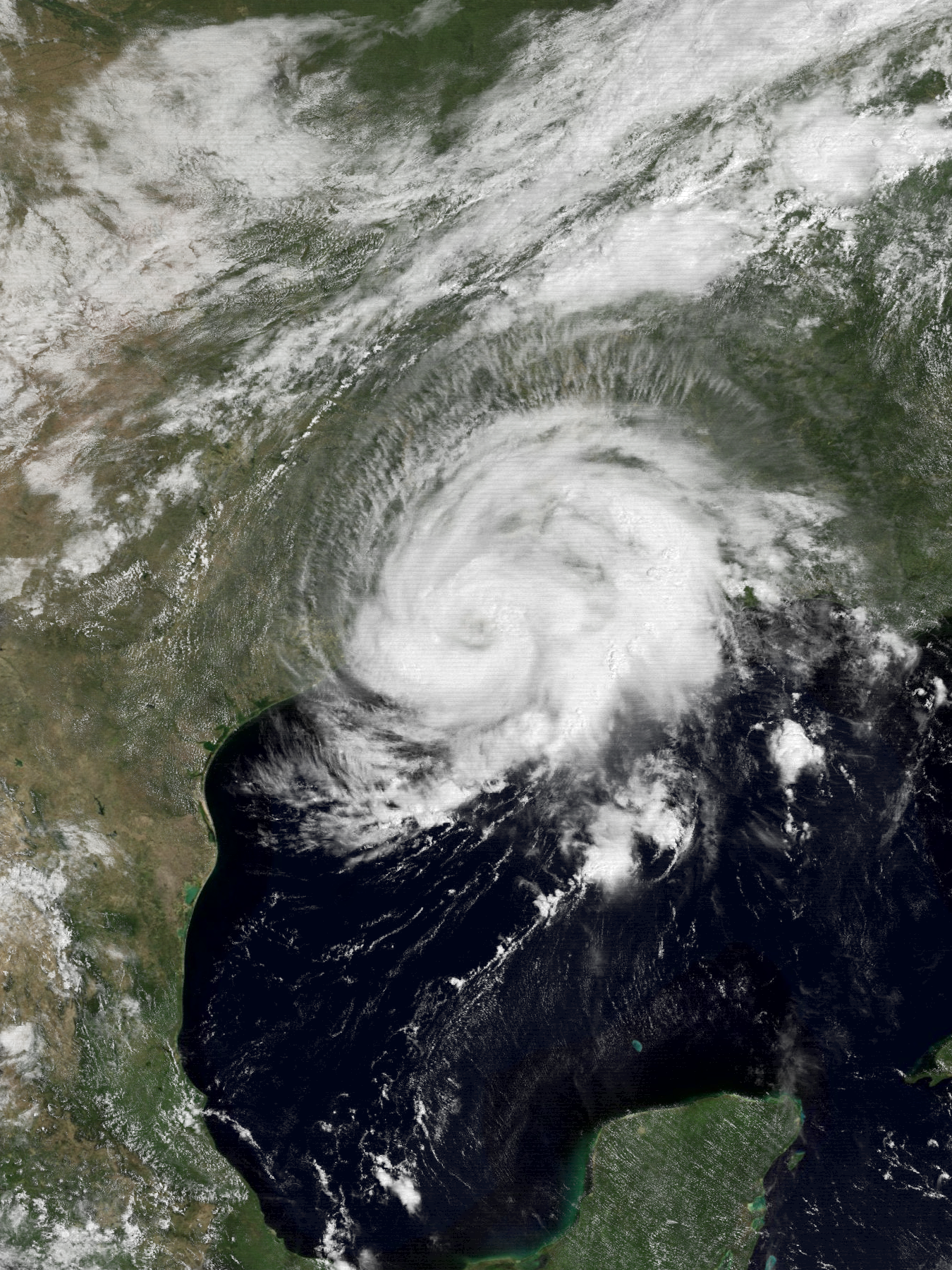
- Danny making landfall in Louisiana at peak intensity on August 15

Meteorological history
- Formed: August 12, 1985
- Extratropical: August 18, 1985
- Dissipated: August 20, 1985

Category 1 hurricane
- 1-minute sustained (SSHWS/NWS)
- Highest winds: 90 mph (150 km/h)
- Lowest pressure: 987 mbar (hPa); 29.15 inHg

Overall effects
- Fatalities: 5
- Damage: $100 million (1985 USD)
- Areas affected: Cuba, Gulf Coast of the United States, Tennessee, Carolinas, Virginia
- IBTrACS
- Part of the 1985 Atlantic hurricane season

Hurricane Danny produced 13 significant (F2+) tornadoes in the Southern United States during August 1985, the most spawned by a tropical cyclone until Hurricane Ivan in 2004. The fourth named storm and third hurricane of the season, Danny developed from a tropical wave in the northwestern Caribbean Sea on August 12. The system moved northwestward and initially remained weak. Early on August 13, it brushed Cape San Antonio, Cuba before emerging the Gulf of Mexico later that day. The system then intensified into Tropical Storm Danny on August 14. Danny deepened further and became a hurricane early on the following day, while beginning to re-curve north-northwestward. Late on August 16, Danny attained its peak intensity with winds of 90 mph (150 km/h). Shortly thereafter, the storm made landfall near Grand Chenier, Louisiana at the same intensity. Early on August 17, Danny weakened to a tropical storm and was downgraded to a tropical depression several hours later. It moved east-northeastward across the Southeastern United States, until dissipating over southeastern Virginia on August 18.

There was widespread coastal and inland flooding in Louisiana. The storm brought up to 8.91 inches (226 mm) of precipitation to Kentwood. Additionally, there were two tornadoes reported in the state. Overall, 33 single-family homes and 26 mobile homes were destroyed, while three condos, 908 single-family houses and 265 mobile homes were damaged. A combination of rainfall and storm surge in southern Mississippi caused severe beach erosion and flooded 70 homes in Hancock County alone. Further north, a tornado in Enterprise severely damaged six homes, three barns, and two roofs; it also destroyed one house. In Alabama, the storm spawned 34 tornadoes, which destroyed 27 single-family residences and 18 mobile homes. About 90 homes, eight mobile homes, and 23 businesses suffered damage. Impact was similar but less severe in several other states, including Georgia, Maryland, South Carolina, Texas, and Virginia. Danny caused five fatalities and about $100 million in damage (1985 USD).

== Meteorological history ==
Map plotting the storm's track and intensity, according to the Saffir–Simpson scale Map key Saffir–Simpson scale Tropical depression (≤38 mph, ≤62 km/h) Tropical storm (39–73 mph, 63–118 km/h) Category 1 (74–95 mph, 119–153 km/h) Category 2 (96–110 mph, 154–177 km/h) Category 3 (111–129 mph, 178–208 km/h) Category 4 (130–156 mph, 209–251 km/h) Category 5 (≥157 mph, ≥252 km/h) Unknown Storm type Tropical cyclone Subtropical cyclone Extratropical cyclone, remnant low, tropical disturbance, or monsoon depression

A tropical wave emerged into the Atlantic Ocean from the west coast of Africa on July 30. The system moved westward across the Atlantic Ocean without much convection, or thunderstorms. On August 8, the wave crossed the crossing the Windward Islands and entered the Caribbean Sea, whereupon convection increased. A broad low-pressure area was evident on August 10 in the central Caribbean Sea. Two days later, a United States Air Force reconnaissance aircraft observed a poorly defined circulation near the Cayman Islands with enough organization to be designated Tropical Depression Four. The nascent depression moved northwestward without further organization, crossing over western Cuba near Cape San Antonio early on August 13. After crossing Cuba into the Gulf of Mexico, the depression organized more and intensified into Tropical Storm Danny early on August 14.

Intensifying over the open waters of the Gulf of Mexico, Danny attained hurricane status around 00:00 UTC on August 15, only 24 hours after being upgraded to a tropical storm. Danny continued to strengthen as it approached the southern United States, maintaining a northwest trajectory. The Hurricane Hunters flew into the hurricane on August 15, observing peak winds of 90 mph (150 km/h) and a minimum barometric pressure of 987 millibars (29.15 InHg). At 16:30 UTC that day, Danny turned to the north and made landfall near Lake Charles, Louisiana. While moving through the state, the hurricane's winds dropped below gale-force within 24 hours. Danny remained a distinct tropical entity as it progressed into the Tennessee Valley on August 17, its circulation drawing in drier air from the northwest. To its north, a weakening weather front was moving to the northwest ahead of a large approaching trough. These weather conditions caused a tornado outbreak, due to the atmospheric instability and high convective available potential energy. On August 19, the circulation associated with former Hurricane Danny merged with the approaching trough, thereby becoming an extratropical cyclone. The remnants of Danny continued to the east-northeast, emerging into the western Atlantic Ocean near the Eastern Shore of Virginia, and were tracked until August 20 to the southeast of Nantucket.

== Preparations ==
Prior to the arrival of Danny, a gale warning and a hurricane watch was issued from the upper-Texas coast to Mobile on August 13. The next day, the gale watch was extended westward. Later that day, the watch was replaced with a hurricane warning, however, the warning area did not include New Orleans. In preparations for this storm, most of the off-shore oil companies evacuated their workers, with Amoco Corporation evacuating 900 people and Exxon-Mobil evacuated nearly 1000 people. About 5,700 people in Louisiana were housed in shelters.

== Impacts ==
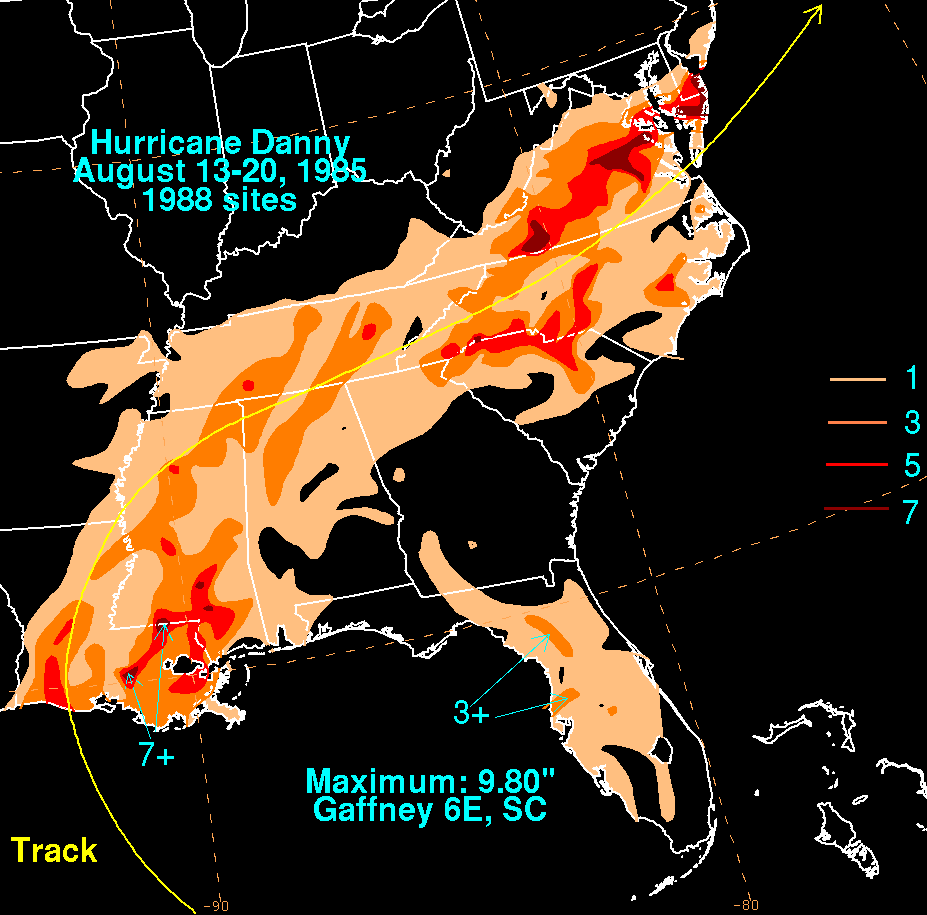
Map of rainfall totals associated with Hurricane Danny in the United States

Overall, Danny killed five people and left $50 to $100 million (1985 USD) in damage along with 73 injuries. Danny also produced an unusually intense outbreak of tornadoes, with a total of 39 touchdowns occurring over seven states. Two tornadoes were reported in Louisiana, 2 in Mississippi, 34 in Alabama, three in Tennessee, four in Georgia, one in South Carolina, and three in North Carolina. Danny's outbreak contained a then-record 13 significant tornadoes spawned by a hurricane; however, since then, Hurricane Ivan surpassed this, producing 18 significant tornadoes. Moderate to heavy rainfall fell to the east of the track while Danny remained tropical. As it was transitioning into a frontal wave across the Eastern United States, heavy rainfall became focused to the left of its track, overrunning the frontal surface ahead of the storm.

=== Louisiana ===
The primary effect from Danny in Louisiana was coastal and inland flooding. The storm dropped heavy rainfall, peaking at 8.91 inches (226 mm) in Kentwood. Along the coast, storm surge inundated barrier islands, damaged coastal marshes, and caused erosion. Two tornadoes were spawned by the storm in Louisiana. Overall, the American Red Cross reported that 33 single-family homes and 26 mobile homes were destroyed, with 454 single-family houses and 175 mobile homes receiving extensive impact. Minor damage was reported at three condos, 90 mobile homes, and 454 single-family homes. Additionally, about 38,000 acres of crops were damaged. Sixty-six people were injured by the storm, though no deaths were reported. Initial property estimations revealed $17 to $23 million in damage, with roughly half of this coming from agricultural damage. The American Insurance Association estimated $25.1 million in insured losses, with the damage toll about two to three times greater than this.

In St. Tammany Parish, 5.5 inches (140 mm) of rain fell in Slidell, flooding streets and dozens of homes. Additionally, strong winds toppled trees, which fell on houses, mobile homes, and cars. Along the coast, storm tides destroyed a $5,000 pier, while low-lying roads in Madisonville and Mandeville were closed due to inundation. Another tornado was spawned in St. Bernard Parish north of Reggio. Coastal flooding along Highway 46 near Hopedale left the road impassable. In Plaquemines Parish, 3 to 4 ft (0.91 to 1.22 m) of storm tides flooded areas along the Mississippi River and outside of the levee system from Empire southward. In Jefferson Parish, a small tornado on Grand Isle de-roofed two buildings, resulting in about $25,000 in damage. At Grand Isle State Park, storm surge destroyed a 100 ft (30 m) section of the pier and 60–100 ft (18–30 m) of the shoreline was eroded, with about 7.8 million cu ft (220,871 m^{3}) of sand washed away from the hurricane protection levee. Overall, at least $320,000 in damage was reported at the state park. Storm surge also damaged several homes and fishing camps in the cities of Galliano, Golden Meadow, Leeville, and Port Fourchon in Lafourche Parish. At Port Fourchon, about 75 ft (23 m) of beach was eroded. Winds downed trees in Lockport, Raceland, and Thibodaux. A 41 ft (12 m) sailboat offshore Terrebonne Parish sank due to rough seas and gales. A Coast Guard helicopter had to evacuate 7 Texans who were on a yacht in the Gulf of Mexico forty miles offshore, since their radio was broken and they were therefore unaware they were sailing into the storm. After being rescued, they were treated for minor injuries at a suburban New Orleans hospital. Inland, the communities of Cocodrie, Montegut, Isle de Jean Charles, and Pointe-aux-Chenes were hardest hit.

In St. Mary Parish, storm surge caused about $500,000 in damage at Cypremort Point State Park. In Iberia Parish, storm surge heights ranging from 5 to 6 ft (1.5 to 1.8 m) inundated barrier islands and coastal marshes, resulting in about $2 million in damage to houses, businesses, and fishing camps. In Vermilion Parish, storm surge inundated areas of Henry and Intracoastal City with up to 3 ft (0.91 m) of water. In the latter, 30 businesses were flooded and a kerosene tank was damaged. Strong winds were also observed in the parish, with gusts up to 114 miles per hour (183 km/h) recorded in Abbeville. The roof of a school in the city was blown off, resulting in about $60,000 in damage. Wind also de-roofed houses and destroyed mobile homes in the cities of Gueydan and Kaplan, while numerous trees were uprooted. Throughout the parish, 23 homes were damaged and seven mobile homes were inflicted with impact or destroyed. In Cameron Parish, a tornado spawned near Hackberry damaged two trailers. A shrimp boat in the Calcasieu River near Cameron was swamped due to strong winds. Moderate storm surge damage was reported in some areas near the mouth of the Mermentau River, in the Rockefeller Wildlife Refuge, and the community of Chenier Au Tigre.

Strong winds in Calcasieu Parish destroyed an airplane hangar in Iowa and uprooted trees. Falling trees crushed cars in Lake Charles and Sulphur. In Jefferson Davis Parish, wind inflicted $3,000 in damage to a warehouse in Jennings. In Acadia Parish, falling trees blocked streets in Crowley, while the roof of a school in Rayne was damaged. Winds also destroyed a barn and overturned a mobile home in Church Point. Strong winds in Allen Parish caused large oaks trees fall on a home and a trailer in Kinder, Louisiana. In Evangeline Parish, several buildings and trees were damaged in the cities of Mamou and Ville Platte. Strong winds in St. Martin Parish also felled trees, which struck a church and homes in Breaux Bridge and St. Martinville. Numerous trees were uprooted in Opelousas, located in St. Landry Parish; one of which fell on a home. Many trees and a business suffered roof damage due to strong winds in Rapides Parish. Additionally, 3 to 4 inches (76 to 102 mm) of rain flooded some streets.

=== Alabama ===
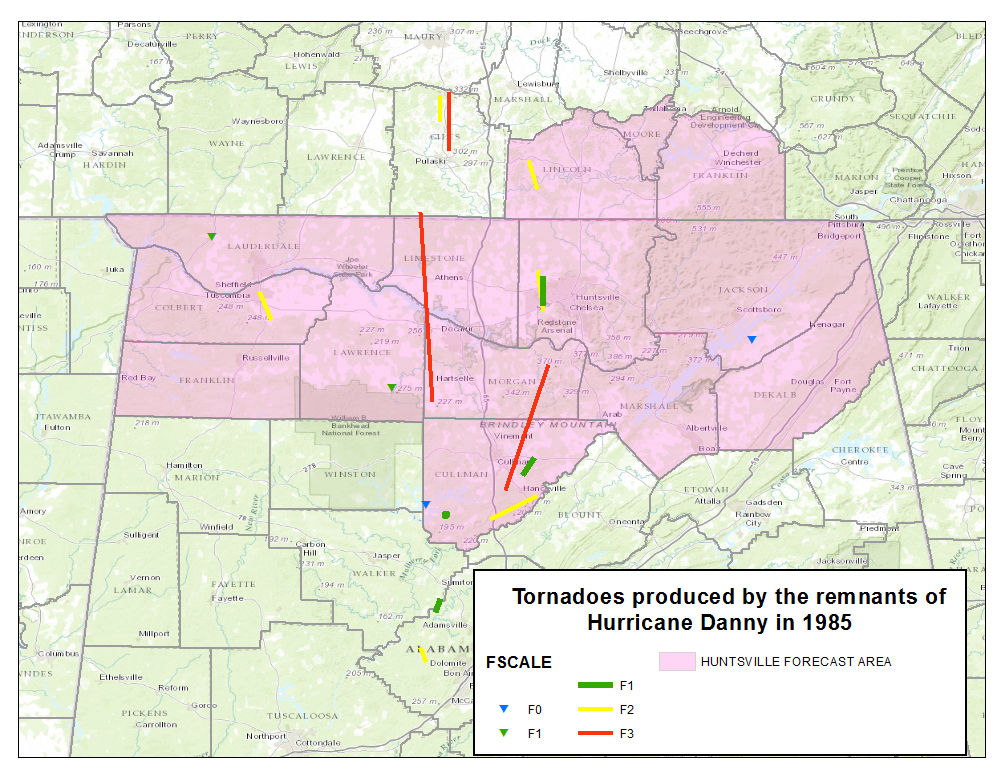
Some tornado tracks from Danny in and near the National Weather Service Huntsville, Alabama, forecast area

The storm spawned a total of 34 tornadoes in Alabama. One of the first twisters was spawned in Parrish, a small town in Walker County. While crossing through the city, the F2 tornado severely damaged or destroyed 15 commercial buildings, 12 homes, and one mobile home. A number of cars were also flipped over. The tornado caused one death – an elderly woman in a mobile homes – and at least one injury. After this tornado, state troopers were dispatched to guard against looting. The next tornado was also spawned in Walker County in the county seat of Jasper. The tornado moved northward just east of downtown and caused extensive damage to an auto parts store and two mobile home sales parks along Route 78. Several vehicles and other homes nearby were damaged, nine of which were left uninhabitable. A third tornado developed over Lawrence County about 5 mi (8.0 km) southeast of Moulton. The brief, F1 tornado downed trees onto a highway, trapping a motorist.

The cyclone then spawned an F2 tornado in Spring Valley in Colbert County. Within the community, the tornado damaged two homes, three mobile homes, and a school, and destroyed an outbuilding. The tornado reached the Muscle Shoals area before lifting, where it primarily impacted trees and power lines, though some buildings suffered roof damage. Shortly thereafter, a long-tracked F3 tornado developed about 3 mi (4.8 km) south of Danville. The tornado damaged or destroyed numerous homes and buildings along its 45 mi (72 km) path, especially over western Limestone County. Few injuries or deaths occurred as many residents took shelter in safe areas of their homes. Two people suffered minor injuries when the tornado destroyed a shop near Trinity. The next tornado touched down near Alliance in Jefferson County. An F2 tornado with a 3 mi (4.8 km) path, the tornado downed trees and destroyed one barn, a few outbuildings, and two buildings at a church campus, while the other buildings at the church suffered damage to their roofs and windows.

In West Jefferson, the storm spawned a tornado which peaked as an F1. The twister damaged three homes in the city, but mainly only damaged trees and power lines elsewhere along its 3 mi (4.8 km) path. A very brief tornado in the Cold Springs area in southwest Cullman County damaged a home and destroyed an outbuilding. Another very brief tornado was spawned near Sumiton, destroying one mobile home. The next tornado touched down in Birmingham near Interstate 459, causing damage to at least one home after trees fell on Alton Road. A second tornado was then spawned in Cullman County, but resulted in no damage. Shortly thereafter, a third tornado touched down in Cullman near Hanceville. The twister caused varying degrees of damage along its path, with the worst impact from near Berlin in Morgan County to the Cullman–Morgan county line, while homes were also damaged in Cotaco, Eva, and Valhermoso Springs in the latter. The tornado damaged more than 30 homes and destroyed a few others. Multiple injuries and one death occurred – an elderly woman had a heart attack while seeking shelter. The next tornado touched down in Lauderdale County near State Route 20 and Natchez Trace Parkway, causing little damage. Another tornado was spawned in Cullman County, moving from just north of Hanceville to just east of Berlin, damaging some buildings before lifting.

A tornado touched down in Jackson County, but caused no damage other than uprooted trees. The cyclone then generated a very brief tornado in Labuco, a community in western Jefferson County, damaging one home. The next tornado was also very briefly, touching down in Barfield, where it unroofed a chicken house. Another tornado occurred in Madison County, moving from just north of Madison to just southeast of Jeff, downing trees and damaging some mobile homes before lifting. An F2 was then spawned in Colony in Cullman County. Along its path, the twister damaged or destroyed several mobile homes and blocked roads due to falling trees. The next tornado touched down at the Redstone Arsenal in Madison County and moved northward toward Jeff. It damaged a 3-story building at Redstone Arsenal and damaged at least four homes and mobile homes. The cyclone also spawned a tornado in Etowah County, which sheered off tree tops just west of Attalla.

Overall, twenty-seven single family residences and 18 mobile homes were destroyed. Forty-six houses and six mobile homes suffering from major damage. Minimal damage was reported in 44 homes, two mobile homes, and 23 businesses. There were two fatalities and 14 injuries in Alabama and $5 million in damage, mostly from tornadoes. Following the storm, then-Governor of Alabama George Wallace declared three counties in the state as a disaster area.

=== Elsewhere ===
Minimal impact from Danny was reported in Texas. The strongest wind speed observed in the state was 39 mph (63 km/h) at Beaumont. Tides of 2 to 3 ft (0.61 to 0.91 m) above normal caused only minor beach erosion, though State Highway 87 was temporarily closed between Sabine Pass and High Island due to sand and debris washed onto the road. Light rainfall was reported in the state, peaking at 1.85 inches (47 mm) in Bon Weir, which is located in extreme eastern Newton County. One indirect death occurred when a man was electrocuted while moving a sailboat near Galveston.

In Mississippi, an F2 tornado spawned by Danny touched down near Hickory at 1230 UTC. Although it mainly moved through forested areas, the tornado severely damaged 6 homes, 3 barns, and 2 roofs; it also destroyed 1 house. Another tornado touched down at Enterprise in Clarke County. Damage was done almost entirely to trees and power lines. Flooding was reported along the south coast of the state, due to rainfall amounts reaching 5 inches (130 mm), high tides, and waves about 2 ft (0.61 m) above normal. Although flooding as mostly limited to streets and low-lying areas, about 70 homes in Hancock County experienced water intrusion. Beach erosion was significant, with roughly 250,000 cu yd (190,000 m^{3}) of sand lost. The cost to replace the sand was estimated at between $3 and 5 million. Wind gusts between 30 and 50 mph (50 and 80 km/h) down power lines, resulting in numerous electrical outages across the state.

The storm spawned 4 tornadoes in Georgia. A tornado touched down near Jefferson in Jackson County. Along its 10 miles (16 km) path, the tornado destroyed two chicken houses and killed several thousand chickens. Additionally, two houses experienced severe damage and a number of others received minor impact. The tornado ended after impacting the Jackson County Airport, where it destroyed 13 aircraft and severely damaged and unroofed a hangar. Another tornado was spawned in Oconee County at the town of Bogart. One mobile home and a house were destroyed and several others suffered various degrees of damage; a number of trees were also downed along its path. Other than tornadoes, impact in Georgia was minimal, with up to 3 inches (76 mm) of rainfall in the northeastern corner of the state.

An F3 tornado spawned by Danny, struck Waco and was 500 yards wide making the tornado the largest hurricane spawned tornado at that time. Thirty-six injuries were also reported by the Red Cross in South Carolina. In some areas of the Carolinas, 7 in (180 mm) of rain fell. After the storm, then-Governor of South Carolina Richard Riley declared a disaster in Spartanburg County. Two people were killed when their car hydroplaned due to a tornado in Rockingham County in North Carolina. The same tornado injured 35 people and displaced 102 families. High winds downed trees and minor flooding was reported.

A frontal boundary, which combined with the remnants of Danny, brought heavy rainfall to the Roanoke Valley region of Virginia. Precipitation amounts ranged from 7 to 8 inches (180 to 200 mm), with estimates of 10 inches (250 mm) in isolated locations. The South Mayo River began to overflow, after rapidly reaching a height of 16 feet (4.9 m). The town of Stuart in Patrick County flooded. Masonite International and the J.P. Stevens Textile Corporation suffered $1.3 million and about $5 million in losses, respectively. Throughout the state, damage totaled approximately $10 million. Following the storm, Governor of Virginia Chuck Robb declared Patrick County a disaster area.

Heavy rainfall was also reported in Maryland in association with the remnants of Danny, with precipitation totals of 10.49 inches (266 mm) in Hollywood, 7.65 inches (194 mm) in Scotland, 5.69 inches (145 mm) in Tall Timbers, 5.35 inches (136 mm) in Compton, 5.23 inches (133 mm) in Mechanicsville, and 5.12 inches (130 mm) in Budds Creek. Throughout St. Mary's County, at least 14 roads were flooded, with the worst being on Route 243 at McIntosh Run. At some houses, foundations washed away, basements collapsed, and walls fell. Additionally, there were driveways with severe erosion. Additionally, some cars were flooded.

In New York City, 17,000 government workers got a day off to save electricity. Six fires occurred in lower Manhattan. Numerous power failures were reported in New England, especially in Massachusetts, forcing the state to buy power from New York and New Brunswick.

== Tornado outbreak ==
Confirmed tornadoes by Fujita rating
FU	F0	F1	F2	F3	F4	F5	Total
0	9	17	10	3	0	0	46

Confirmed tornadoes during the August 15–18, 1985 tornado outbreak (Note: All dates are based on the local time zone where the tornado touched down.) (Note: All damage totals are in 1985 USD)
F#	Location	County / Parish	Date	Time (CST)	Path length	Max width	Damage
Louisiana
F2	Grand Isle area	Jefferson	August 15	2:40 a.m.	0.7 miles (1.1 km)	20 yards (18 m)	Destroyed the roofs of two buildings.
F1	S of Hackberry	Jefferson	August 15	11:45 a.m.	0.7 mi (1.1 km)	20 yd (18 m)	Destroyed two trailers.
F0	N of Reggio	Saint Bernard	August 15	14:30 a.m.	0.7 mi (1.1 km)	18 yd (16 m)	
Mississippi
F2	E of Hickory	Newton	August 16	6:35 a.m.	4.5 miles (7.2 km)	520 feet (160 m)	
F0	S of Enterprise	Clarke	August 16	8:30 a.m.	160 feet (50 m)	980 feet (300 m)	
Alabama
F2	Parrish area	Walker	August 16	10:00 a.m.	1.3 mi (2.1 km)	120 yd (110 m)	1 death – Tornado moved through business district, and damaged or destroyed 28 buildings. A mobile home was wrecked, killing the owner.
F2	Jasper area	Walker	August 16	10:10 a.m.	1.5 mi (2.4 km)	130 yd (120 m)	From the same tornado family as the Parrish tornado, the twister crossed U.S. Route 78, damaging cars adjacent buildings. Five people were injured.
F1	SE of Moulton	Lawrence	August 16	11:20 a.m.	0.1 mi (0.16 km)	30 yd (27 m)	Brief tornado downed several trees, one of which trapped a motorist.
F2	Muscle Shoals area	Colbert	August 16	11:35 a.m.	8 mi (13 km)	100 yd (91 m)	Tornado first struck Spring Valley, where it damaged nine buildings and injured two people. In Muscle Shoals, impacts were confined to roofs, trees, and power lines.
F3	Danville area	Morgan, Limestone	August 16	11:40 a.m.	45 mi (72 km)	100 yd (91 m)	Lasting for 100 minutes, at times as a funnel cloud, the twister started south of Danville and passed near Neel and Trinity. It damaged several buildings in western Limestone County, injuring two people.
F2	Alliance area	Jefferson	August 16	11:55 a.m.	3 mi (4.8 km)	60 yd (55 m)	Brief tornado took an intermittent path, damaging a barn and a church.
F1	West Jefferson	Jefferson/Walker	August 16	12:18 p.m.	3 mi (4.8 km)	50 yd (46 m)	The twister damaged two houses and knocked down power lines and trees.
F1	Cold Springs	Cullman	August 16	12:23 p.m.	0.6 mi (0.97 km)	30 yd (27 m)	Short-lived tornado damaged a house and outbuildings.
F1	NW of Sumiton	Walker	August 16	12:30 p.m.	0.1 mi (0.16 km)	30 yd (27 m)	Short-lived tornado destroyed a mobile home.
F1	Birmingham area	Jefferson	August 16	12:45 p.m.	0.2 mi (0.32 km)	40 yd (37 m)	Short-lived tornado knocked down trees, which damaged one home.
F0	Wheat area	Cullman	August 16	12:55 p.m.	0.8 mi (1.3 km)	40 yd (37 m)	Short-lived tornado that moved through a wooded area.
Source:National Climatic Data Center

== See also ==
- Other storms of the same name
