= Hatton, Alabama =

Hatton, Alabama may refer to:

- Hatton, Colbert County, Alabama, an unincorporated community
- Hatton, Lawrence County, Alabama, a census-designated place and unincorporated community
