= WNRA =

WNRA may refer to:

- WNRA-LP, a low-power radio station (94.5 FM) licensed to serve Hawk Pride, Alabama, United States
- WULA, a defunct radio station (1240 AM) formerly licensed to serve Eufaula, Alabama
