= Village Number 1, Alabama =

Unincorporated community in Alabama, United States

- Nitrate Village No. 1 Historic District
- U.S. National Register of Historic Places
- U.S. Historic district
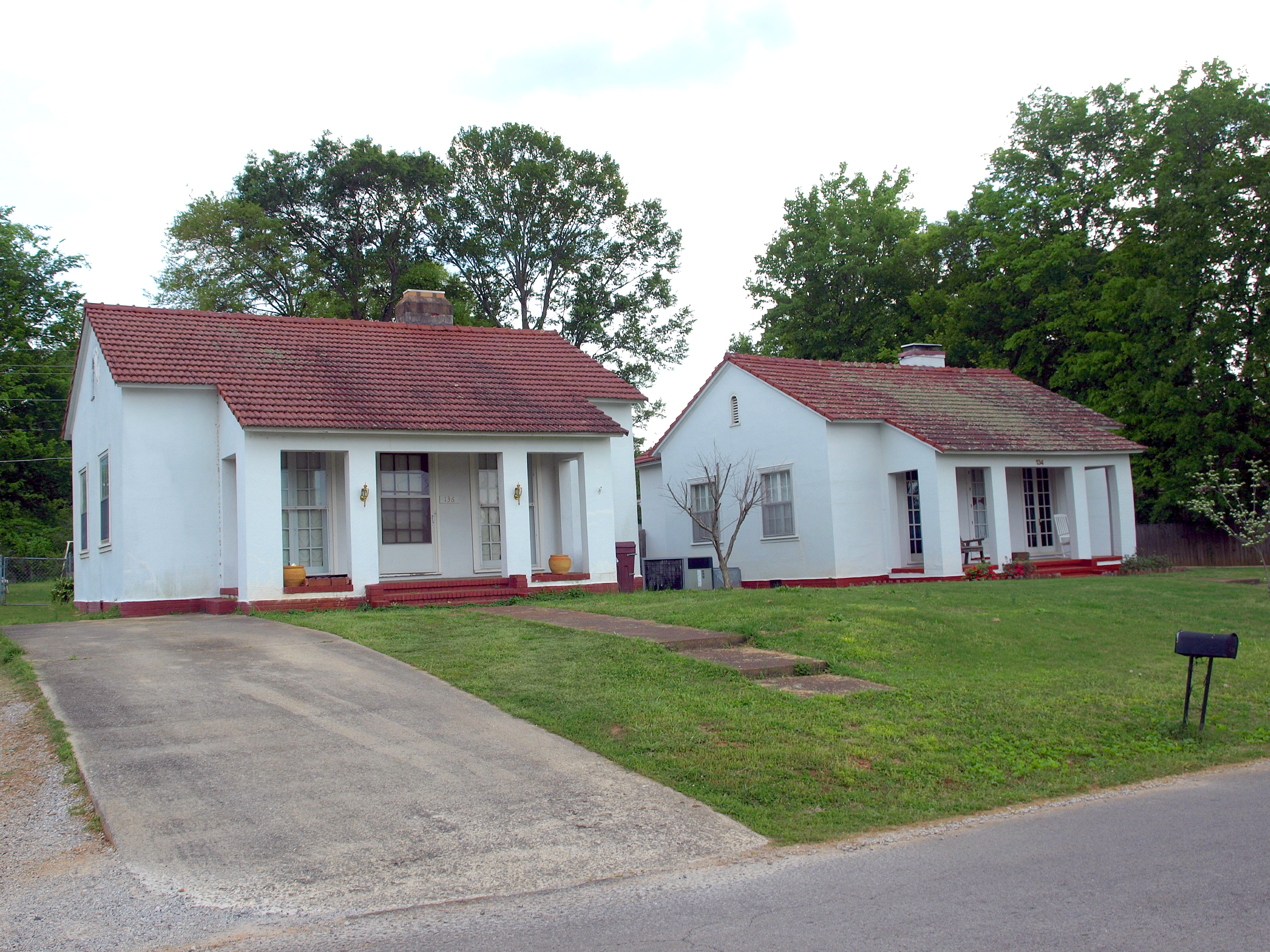
- Houses on Norris Circle in April 2017

- Location within Alabama Location within the United States
- Location: Roughly bounded by Wilson Dam Circle, Wheeler and Wilson Dam Aves., Fontana, and Pickwick Sts., Sheffield, Alabama
- Coordinates: 34°44′24″N 87°43′04″W
- Area: 75 acres (30 ha)
- Architect: Harold A. Caparn
- Architectural style: American Craftsman, Mission Revival
- NRHP reference No.: 84000603
- Added to NRHP: August 30, 1984

Village Number 1, also known as The Village and Nitrate Plant Number 1 Reservation Subdivision, is an unincorporated community in Colbert County, Alabama, United States.

== History ==
In 1916, President Woodrow Wilson signed the National Defense Act, which authorized the construction of two nitrate-manufacturing plants and a dam to provide them hydropower. President Wilson chose Muscle Shoals, Alabama as the site of the dam, which when completed in 1924, was named Wilson Dam. The new plant would produce ammonium nitrate using the Haber process. It was soon discovered the Haber process would not produce the amount of nitrate needed, so another plant was built that employed the cyanamide process.

The New York City architect, Harold Caparn, who helped expand the Brooklyn Botanic Garden, was chosen as chief architect of an industrial village that would house supervisors and workers for the Nitrate Plant No. 1. Construction of the village began in the latter half of 1918. The village was designed in the pattern of a handbell, with houses surrounding the handle, body, and clapper, and a school at the base. At its completion, the village contained 112 residential structures, 2 school buildings, and one large apartment building that housed unmarried officers. Maud Lindsay, a nationally known writer of children's books, was chosen as the first kindergarten teacher at the school.

World War I ended on November 11, 1918, and with it, the production of ammonium nitrate was no longer needed. The plant was closed, and the newly built houses stood unoccupied. In 1921, Henry Ford offered to buy the plants and village with plans to develop it into an industrial complex. Until 1933, only a small number of the houses were occupied, all by Alabama Power Company workers. Senator George W. Norris thought the site should be utilized for public use, and in May 1933, President Franklin D. Roosevelt formed the Tennessee Valley Authority. The industrial complex would be used for fertilizer production and as a development center. In 1949, the streets, playgrounds, and school were deeded to the city of Sheffield by the TVA and the houses were auctioned to the public.

== See also ==
- Nitrate City, Alabama
- International Fertilizer Development Center
- List of National Historic Landmarks in Alabama
- National Register of Historic Places listings in Colbert County, Alabama
