= Sheffield High School =

Sheffield High School may refer to:

== Australia ==
- Sheffield District High School — Sheffield, Tasmania

== United Kingdom ==
- Sheffield High School, South Yorkshire — Sheffield, England
- Sheffield Collegiate School — Sheffield, England

== United States ==
- Sheffield High School (Alabama) — Sheffield, Alabama
- Sheffield High School (Tennessee) — Memphis, Tennessee
- Sheffield Middle/High School — Sheffield, Pennsylvania
- Sheffield Career and Technology Center — Memphis, Tennessee
- Sheffield-Chapin Community High School — Sheffield, Iowa
