= National Defense Act of 1916 =

Former American law

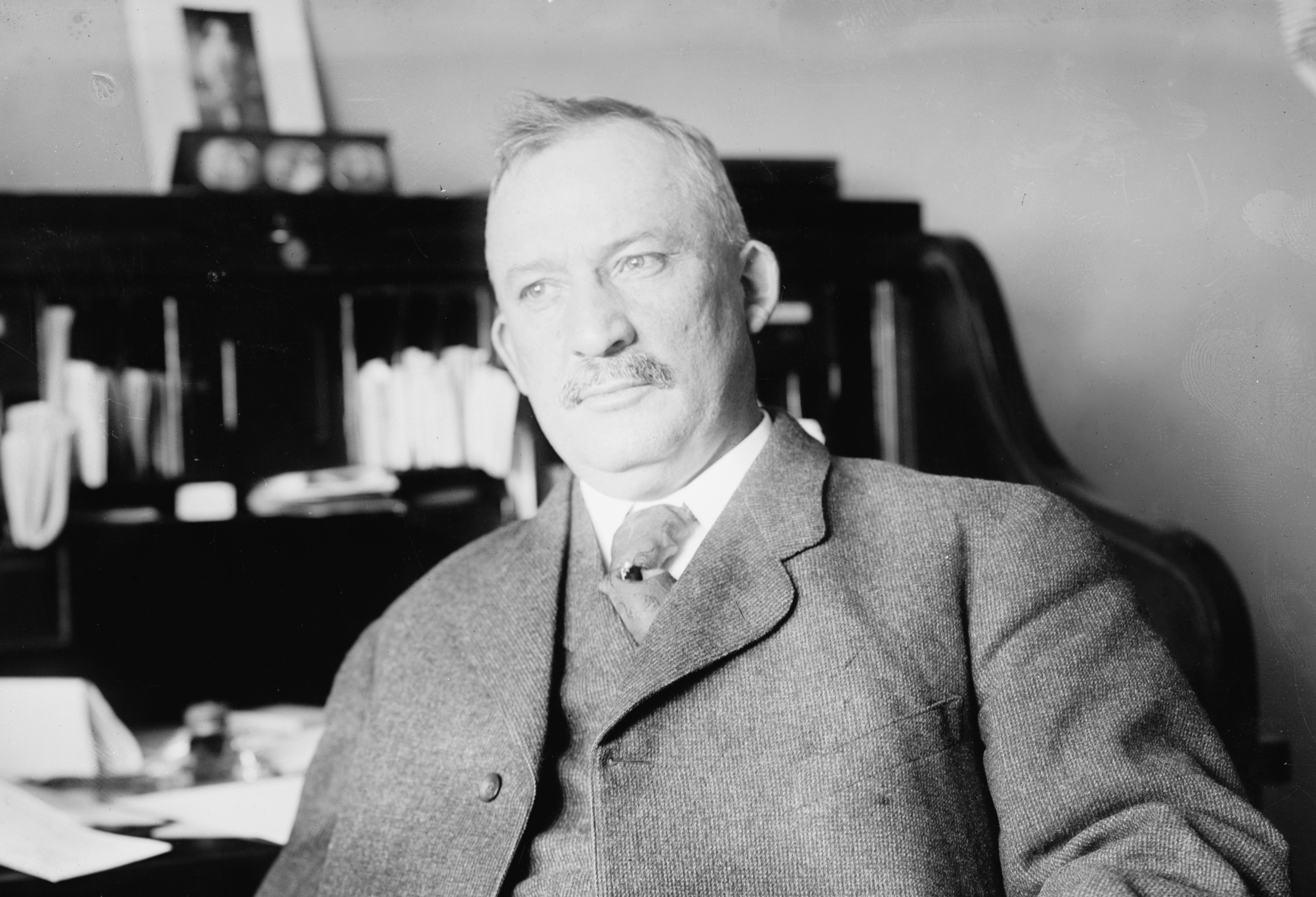
Rep. James Hay of Virginia, Chairman of the House Committee on Military Affairs.

The National Defense Act of 1916, Pub. L. 64–85, 39 Stat. 166, enacted June 3, 1916, was a United States federal law that updated the Militia Act of 1903, which related to the organization of the military, particularly the National Guard. The principal change of the act was to supersede provisions as to exemptions. The 1916 act included an expansion of the Army and the National Guard, the creation of an Officers' and an Enlisted Reserve Corps, and the creation of a Reserve Officers' Training Corps. The president was also given expanded authority to federalize the National Guard, with changes to the duration and the circumstances under which he could call it up. The Army began the creation of an Aviation arm, and the federal government took steps to ensure the immediate availability of wartime weapons and equipment by contracting in advance for production of gunpowder and other material.

== Background ==
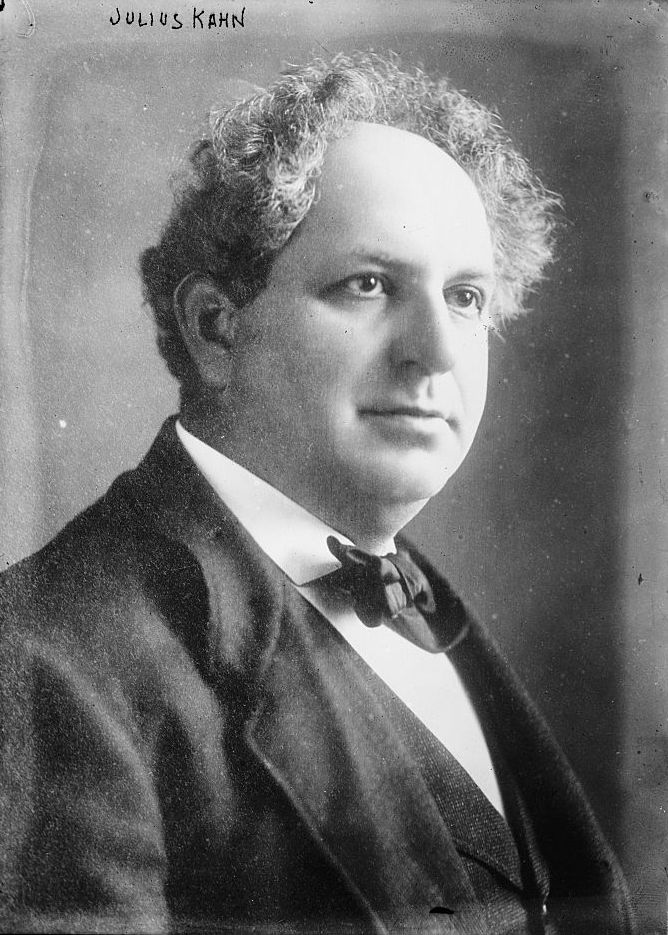
Rep. Julius Kahn of California

The act was passed amidst the "preparedness controversy", after Pancho Villa's cross-border raid on Columbus, New Mexico, and prior to U.S. entry into World War I. Its chief proponent was James Hay of Virginia, the Chairman of the House Committee on Military Affairs.

Sponsored by the committee's ranking member, Julius Kahn of California and drafted by Hay, the 1916 law authorized an expanded Army of 175,000, and an enlarged National Guard of 450,000.

== Composition Exemptions ==
The origins exempting "such as the laws of each State shall think it proper" first presented by Alexander Hamilton, became section 2 of the May 8th Militia Acts of 1792. "The principal changes made by the 1916 act were to omit the exemption in the 1903 act of "all persons who are exempted by the laws of the respective States and Territories". and to add in the 1916 act the clause, "but no person so exempted shall be exempt from militia service in any capacity that the President shall declare to be noncombatant". A religious exemption had been under consideration since James Madison originally presented what was to become the Second Amendment.

== Reserve Officer Training Corps ==
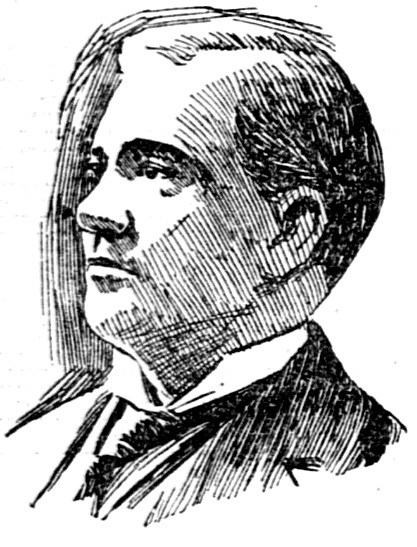
William Oxley Thompson, Ohio State University President, ROTC advocate

The provision to establish the Reserve Officer Training Corps was advocated by a delegation from Ohio including William Oxley Thompson, President of Ohio State University. On February 7, 1916, Ralph D. Mershon, a graduate of Ohio State, testified before the committee as a professional engineer. Present to testify as an advocate of a Reserve Engineers Corps, he expanded his remarks to argue in favor of the "Ohio Plan". Mershon noted (in bold):

"...the transformation that will take place in one term of drill in a man just off the farm and very clumsy when he enters college, and who at the end of a term is 'set up', carries himself well, looks neat in his uniform, and has acquired a measure of self-respect, and the respect of his colleagues, to an extent he would not have had without the military training".

Congress agreed, and the ROTC provision was included in the final version of the law.

== National Guard ==
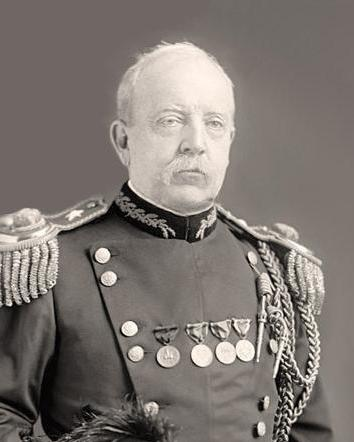
William Abram Mann, first head of the expanded and reorganized Militia Bureau

The 1916 Act also authorized the National Guard to use federal funds to pay for 48 days of drill a year, as well as 15 days of annual training, an improvement over the previous authorization of five days of summer camp, with no federal funds for drills.

The new law also made the Army's Division of Militia Affairs the expanded and reorganized Militia Bureau, which oversaw federal funding and other requirements for the National Guard in each state.

The 1916 Act also authorized the President to mobilize the National Guard in case of war or other national emergency, and for the duration of the event. The National Guard had previously been limited to service within each state, or federal activation within the United States for up to nine months. Under the 1916 Act, members of the National Guard could be discharged from the militia and drafted into the United States Army for overseas service (to comply with a 1912 decision by the Judge Advocate General of the Army that used a constitutional argument to restrict the overseas use of the National Guard), and could be called up for an unlimited duration. In addition, the Army was prevented from recruiting volunteer units to expand the organization in time of war until after the National Guard had been called up.

The provisions for National Guard activation were used during the Pancho Villa Expedition and World War I. When the National Guard was federalized for World War I, efforts to create volunteer units, which had been used from the Mexican–American War to the Spanish–American War as a way to bypass the issue of when the National Guard could be federalized, came to an end.

== Additional results ==
The 1916 Act also allocated over $17 million for the Army to field 375 new airplanes, and created the Air Division to administer the Aviation Section, U.S. Signal Corps, which was based at Langley Field.

The President also requested that the National Academy of Sciences establish the National Research Council to conduct research into the potential of mathematical, biological, and physical science applications for defense.

As part of the debate over preparedness, Congress was concerned with ensuring the supply of nitrates (used to make munitions), so the 1916 Act authorized the construction of two nitrate-manufacturing plants, an industrial village, and a dam to provide them hydropower. President Wilson chose Muscle Shoals, Alabama, as the site of the dam. Wilson Dam was later named for him, and the dam and nitrate plants built in Muscle Shoals were absorbed into the Tennessee Valley Authority in 1933.

== Subsequent changes ==
=== National Defense Act Amendments of 1920 ===
The National Defense Act Amendments of 1920, Pub. L. 66–242, 41 Stat. 759, enacted June 4, 1920, a.k.a. the National Defense Act of 1920, amended the National Defense Act of 1916, including the creation of the United States Army Air Service and the Chemical and Finance branches. The 1920 act also included a provision that the chief of the National Guard Bureau be a National Guard officer, and allowed for National Guard officers to serve on the Army General staff.

=== National Defense Act Amendments of 1933 ===
The National Defense Act Amendments of 1933, Pub. L. 73–64, 48 Stat. 153, enacted June 15, 1933, provided that the National Guard is considered a component of the Army at all times. Beginning with this law, each National Guard member has two military statuses—a member of the National Guard of his or her state (Title 32 duties), or a member of the National Guard of the United States (Title 10 duties) when federalized. This enhanced the 1916 Act's mobilization provisions, making it possible to deploy National Guard units and individual members directly for overseas service in the event of a war. It is possible for a National Guard Soldier to switch back and forth from Title 10 to Title 32 status by virtue of the mission, on a routine basis.

In 1940, Section 61 of the National Defense Act of 1916 was modified to reauthorize the establishment of state defense forces that had been permitted prior to 1916.

== See also ==
- National Guard of the United States
- National Guard Bureau
- State Defense Forces
