= Nitrate (disambiguation) =

Nitrate is a polyatomic ion with the chemical formula NO^{−}_{3}

Nitrate or nitrates may also refer to:

- Nitrates, a group of salts containing this ion
- Nitrate (photography), in photography it is a synonym for chemical nitrocellulose
- Nitrate City, Alabama

== See also ==
- Nitrite
