= WNRA-LP =

- Hawk Pride, Alabama; United States
- Broadcast area: Muscle Shoals, Alabama
- Frequency: 94.5 MHz
- Branding: Real Country 94.5 FM

Programming
- Format: Classic country

Ownership
- Owner: NAHF, Inc.; (Northern Alabama Historical Foundation)

History
- First air date: June 22, 2015
- Former call signs: WSHF-LP (2014–2022)
- Former frequencies: 92.3 MHz (2014–2019)
- Call sign meaning: "National Recovery Administration"

Technical information
- Licensing authority: FCC
- Facility ID: 194014
- Class: L1
- ERP: 100 watts
- HAAT: −2.117558 meters (−6.94737 ft)
- Transmitter coordinates: 34°41′58.4″N 87°45′15.4″W

Links
- Public license information: LMS
- Website: wnraradio.com

WNRA-LP (94.5 FM, "The Voice of The Shoals") is a radio station licensed to serve Hawk Pride, Alabama. The station is owned by NAHF Inc. It airs a heavy schedule of local news, traffic, and weather information.

== History ==
NAHF, Inc. applied for a low-power FM license on 92.3 FM in late 2013. The station was assigned the WSHF-LP call letters by the Federal Communications Commission on February 17, 2014. The WSHF call letters were originally assigned to AM 1380 in Sheffield, owned by Daylight Broadcasting. This first WSHF was founded by Dick Biddle, who surrendered the station's license to purchase WOWL (1240 AM) in 1952. The WSHF call letters were later used by AM 1290 in Sheffield from 1963 to 1985, when it became WHCM. WSHF-LP signed on the air June 22, 2015, positioning itself as "The Sound of Muscle Shoals". A similar format had previously been used in the area on WLAY (1450 AM), which operated an FM translator on 92.3 from 2007 to 2012.

On October 1, 2019, WSHF-LP announced it would move up the FM dial from 92.3 to 94.5 FM. The station cited continued interference from a co-channel station in Tennessee as the reason for its move up the FM dial.

Following the deletion of AM station WNRA (1240 AM) in Eufaula, Alabama, the station changed its call sign to WNRA-LP on July 16, 2022. By reclaiming the call letters, the station continued a tradition of broadcasting that dates all the way back to November 1933 when WNRA (1420 AM; the forerunner of WLAY) signed on the air as the first station in northwest Alabama.
