= Pride, Alabama =

Unincorporated community in Alabama, United States

- Unincorporated community
- Location within Alabama Location within the United States
- Coordinates: 34°43′25″N 87°49′14″W
- Country: United States
- State: Alabama
- County: Colbert
- Time zone: UTC-6 (Central (CST))
  - Summer (DST): UTC-5 (CDT)
- Area codes: 256 & 938
- GNIS feature ID: 163938

Pride is an unincorporated community in Colbert County, Alabama, United States.

== History ==
Variant names were "Prides" and "Prides Station". A post office called Pride's Station was established in 1870, and remained in operation until 1915. The origin of the name "Pride" is obscure. Pride's Station is named for Edward Mitchel Pride who landed at Pride's Landing sometime after July 1797 and eventually built the family home there. This is documented in numerous Alabama historical documents including Colbert County Families (Lanes, Prides, Goodloes, Rutlands, & Bartons).
