= Rachel Wammack =

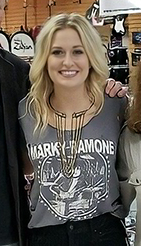
- Wammack in 2018

Background information
- Born: June 28, 1994 (age 32); Muscle Shoals, Alabama, United States
- Genre: Country
- Occupations: Singer, Songwriter
- Instrument: Vocals
- Label: RCA Nashville
- Spouse: Noah Purcell (married 2019–present)

Rachel Purcell is a CCM singer/songwriter. She was formerly a country music singer/songwriter signed to RCA Records under her maiden name Rachel Wammack. She is currently signed to Centricity Music. She from Muscle Shoals, Alabama. In 2025, she released her first EP, Mercy and Me.

== Career ==
=== As Rachel Wammack ===
Wammack is from Muscle Shoals, Alabama. She wrote her first song when she was 12 and by 17 was discovered by Sony. Before she began her recording career, she attended the University of North Alabama where she was crowned Miss UNA 2015. Six months after she finished school she signed with Sony and moved to Nashville.

Her first self-titled EP was produced by Dann Huff and was released on April 6, 2018. Rolling Stone magazine listed Wammack as one of “10 new Country artists you need to know.” Her single "My Boyfriend Doesn't Speak For Me Anymore" was also featured on Rolling Stone and was described as "mixing the power-pop pipes of Adele with the women-first attitude of Loretta Lynn." The EP also features her first single, "Damage", which was co-written with Tom Douglas and David Hodges.

On March 15, 2019, she released her single "Enough." Her next single, "Something People Say (Acoustic)", was released on June 6, 2019.

After a two-year hiatus from social media, Wammack released her single "Like Me" on August 12, 2022. Wammack has described "Like Me" as "a love note to me and a reminder to the world [...] I'm not everybody's cup of tea and that's OK. That was a hard thing for me to reckon with. But now, I feel like people are more drawn to me now that I like myself."

=== As Rachel Purcell ===
On December 11, 2024, Purcell signed with Centricity Music. On January 10, 2025 she released her first single, "Show Up". She released her first EP, Mercy and Me on August 1, 2025.

== Personal life ==
Rachel Wammack was born on June 28, 1994. She was raised in Muscle Shoals, Alabama and attended Muscle Shoals High School, where she performed in the school's marching band and percussion ensemble. Wammack attended the University of North Alabama and was crowned Miss UNA 2015. On August 3, 2019, she married Noah Purcell.

== Discography ==
=== Extended plays ===
List of extended plays, with selected details
Title	Details
Enough	Released: March 15, 2019; Label: Sony; Format: Digital download

=== Singles ===
Year	Single	Peak chart positions	Album
Year	Single	US Country Airplay	Album
2018	"Damage"	54	Enough
