= Kelvin Holly =

American guitarist and musician (born 1954)

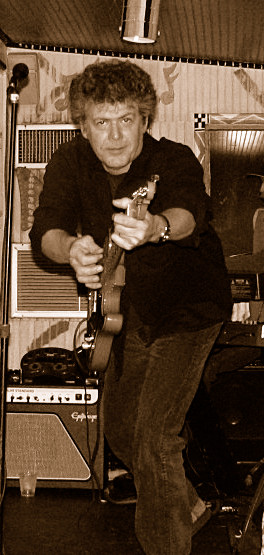

Kelvin Lee Holly (born September 13, 1954, in Fort Dix, New Jersey, United States) is an American guitarist and musician.

== Background ==
His musical career began in 1972 after graduating high school in Montgomery, Alabama.

Holly played guitar in various bands including Amazing Rhythm Aces, most known for its 1975 hit “Third Rate Romance,” The Decoys, and Pegi Young and The Survivors. It was Holly's induction into the local band The Decoys that brought Holly to Muscle Shoals, Alabama, in 1991. Holly played with The Decoys alongside other local musicians like David Hood and Roger Hawkins, who were both Swampers, and Will McFarlane. That connection led to session work for Holly at Muscle Shoals Sound Studios and FAME Studios.

Holly stepped in as a guitarist for Little Richard’s Band in 1995 — a gig he would hold for about 20 years — after he was recommended to the rock-and-roll legend by fellow musicians who’d developed working relationships with Little Richard when he recorded at FAME in the 1970s. As a studio musician, he has appeared on numerous albums, including those by Little Richard, Bobby Bland, Gregg Allman, Klaus Voormann and on various movie soundtracks.
