= Mountain Mills, Alabama =

Unincorporated community in Alabama, United States

- Unincorporated community
- Location within Alabama Location within the United States
- Coordinates: 34°42′15″N 87°53′35″W
- Country: United States
- State: Alabama
- County: Colbert
- Elevation: 541 ft (165 m)
- Time zone: UTC-6 (Central (CST))
  - Summer (DST): UTC-5 (CDT)
- Area codes: 256 & 938
- GNIS feature ID: 166023

Mountain Mills is an unincorporated community in Colbert County, Alabama, United States.

== History ==
In 1872, a group of men in Colbert County, including N. F. Cherry, organized the Mountain Mill Company. The company was organized with the intent of building a cotton mill to produce thread and cloth. The Globe Factory in Florence, Alabama was burned by troops from the 10th Missouri Volunteer Cavalry in 1863 and rebuilt as the Cypress Mill. After the Cypress Mill closed in 1886, some of its machinery and employees became part of the Mountain Mills operations. The steam-powered mill commenced operations in 1886 under the ownership of W. H. Cherry & Co. The mill contained 6,000 spindles, 41 cards, and produced single and ply yarn. The yarn was sold in Philadelphia, New York City, and Providence, Rhode Island. The community was home to over 300 people, and contained a church and school. In 1893, the mill at Mountain Mills closed. The machinery was moved to Florence and became part of the Cherry Cotton Mill.

A post office operated under the name Mountain Mills from 1883 to 1893.
