= Hatton, Colbert County, Alabama =

Unincorporated community in Alabama, United States

Hatton, Alabama
- Unincorporated community
- Location within Alabama Location within the United States
- Coordinates: 34°45′20″N 87°29′07″W
- Country: United States
- State: Alabama
- County: Colbert
- Elevation: 650 ft (200 m)
- Time zone: UTC-6 (Central (CST))
  - Summer (DST): UTC-5 (CDT)
- Area codes: 256 & 938
- GNIS feature ID: 132903

Hatton is an unincorporated community in Colbert County, Alabama, United States. Hatton is located on Alabama State Route 184, 10.4 miles (16.7 km) east of Muscle Shoals.
