= Sheffield City Schools =

School district in Alabama, United States

Sheffield City School District is a school district in Colbert County, Alabama. Founded in 1888, it serves the city Sheffield's population of about 10,000 (around 1,150 students).

== Schools ==
- Sheffield High School
- Sheffield Junior High School
- L.E. Willson Elementary School
- W.A. Threadgill Primary School
