= Listerhill, Alabama =

Unincorporated community in Alabama, United States

- Unincorporated community
- Location within Alabama Location within the United States
- Coordinates: 34°45′27″N 87°34′56″W
- Country: United States
- State: Alabama
- County: Colbert
- Elevation: 551 ft (168 m)
- Time zone: UTC-6 (Central (CST))
  - Summer (DST): UTC-5 (CDT)
- Area codes: 256 & 938
- GNIS feature ID: 156614

Listerhill is an unincorporated community in Colbert County, in the U.S. state of Alabama.

Listerhill contains a large aluminum plant. The community was named in honor of J. Lister Hill, a United States Senator from Alabama who was instrumental in the construction of the plant.
