= Spring Valley, Alabama =

Unincorporated community in Alabama, United States

- Unincorporated community
- Location within Alabama Location within the United States
- Coordinates: 34°39′24″N 87°37′00″W
- Country: United States
- State: Alabama
- County: Colbert
- Elevation: 512 ft (156 m)
- Time zone: UTC-6 (Central (CST))
  - Summer (DST): UTC-5 (CDT)
- Postal codes: 356774 for Tuscumbia and 35646 for Leighton
- Area codes: 256 & 938
- GNIS feature ID: 127269

Spring Valley is an unincorporated community in Colbert County, Alabama, United States. Spring Valley is located at the junction of County Highways 57 and 61, 6.7 miles (10.8 km) south-southeast of Muscle Shoals. Spring Valley was the site of the former Spring Valley grade school and hosted many events, such as the Miss Spring Valley Pageant. One of the winners was Miss Doris (Hunter) Lowery. Spring Valley school hosted large political rallies in the 1960s, on the Saturday before the spring primary elections. Big Jim Folsom appeared one night thinking everyone had come out to see him.

Favorite sons of Spring Valley include many military veterans, including: Fred Coburn who died onboard the USS Grayback submarine when it was sunk near Okinawa, Japan in WW II and William E Berryman, Corporal in the US Marines who died in Viet Nam on 12/07/1970.

Spring Valley is home to several churches, including Spring Valley Church of Christ, Spring Valley Baptist, Spring Valley Church of God, and Mt Moriah Baptist. Spring Valley is home to Bobby Wright, who since the 1970s has provided a Christmas light spectacle along his circular drive and is visited by thousands from Thanksgiving to new years.

Spring Valley has been home to country stores through the years, including stores owned by Wallace Rutland, Dewey Isbell, Hubert Stanley, Mr. Elmer "Ford" and Mrs. Wylodean McDaniel Fuller, and Rube Mitchell. Mr. Mitchell also operated a cotton gin behind the store.

The Rogers Group has operated a limestone quarry located between the Three Mile Lane and Gargis Lane since the 1950s. Known back in the day as the "rock crusher", blasts from the quarry could be felt across Spring Valley as the quarry was expanded. A more recent company calling Spring Valley home is Sims Bark Co., located at the intersection of 3 Mile Lane and Spring Valley Road. The company sells mulch, soil, and landscaping material. Spring Valley is also home to the Colbert base for AirEvac Helicopter Service.
