= Muscle Shoals City School District =

School district in Alabama, United States

Address
- 3200 South Wilson Dam Road Muscle Shoals, Alabama, 35661; United States

District information
- Type: Public
- Grades: PreK–12
- NCES District ID: 0102520

Students and staff
- Students: 2,801
- Teachers: 154.48
- Staff: 115.08
- Student–teacher ratio: 18.13

Other information
- Website: www.mscs.k12.al.us

Muscle Shoals City School District is a school district in Colbert County, Alabama, United States.

The District includes the following schools:

- Muscle Shoals Early Learning Center
- Howell Graves Kindergarten
- Highland Park Elementary School
- McBride Elementary School
- Webster Elementary School
- Muscle Shoals Middle School
- Muscle Shoals High School
- Muscle Shoals Career Academy
