= Muscle Shoals High School =

Public school in Alabama, United States

Coordinates: 34.74306°N 87.64653°W

Location
- 1900 Avalon Avenue; Muscle Shoals, Alabama 35661; United States

Information
- Type: Public school
- Established: 1962 (64 years ago)
- School district: Muscle Shoals City School District
- CEEB code: 011927
- Principal: Dustin Davis
- Teaching staff: 43.40 (FTE)
- Grades: 9–12
- Enrollment: 874 (2023–2024)
- Student to teacher ratio: 20.14
- Colors: Scarlet and black
- Mascot: Trojan
- Website: mshs.mscs.k12.al.us

Muscle Shoals High School (MSHS), is the sole public secondary education institution in Muscle Shoals, Alabama, United States. The school has been awarded the Blue Ribbon Lighthouse Award for Excellence.

== Academics ==
Based on the Alabama Reading and Math Test scores, the system has consistently placed among the top 10 school districts in one or more areas in most grade levels. In 2017, AL.com ranked Muscle Shoals High School in the top 20 Alabama high schools for science and math.

== Band ==
The Muscle Shoals High School band program was founded in 1965. The marching band has received Superior ratings every year since 1966, along with First Place, Best in Class, and Grand Champion awards. In 2001, they traveled to Atlanta, Georgia to be the first band from Alabama to compete in Bands of America (BOA). Since then, the band has been Class A Champions in Atlanta four times (2002, 2003, 2004, 2005). At the Alabama Bandmasters Association State Festival, the Muscle Shoals High School Symphonic Band has earned Superiors for the past 13 consecutive years. In 2005, the band traveled to Orlando, Florida to compete in the All-Star Music Festival. There they were awarded Grand Champions in Parade Band, Concert Band, Concert Percussion, and Jazz Band. In 2009, they returned to the Orlando All-Star Music Festival to receive the Grand Champion title in Concert Band, Concert Percussion, and Jazz Band.

During the 2007–08 season, the marching band won the Grand Champion trophy at the Dixie Pride Marching Classic and the Vanderbilt Marching Invitational and won 3rd Place in Class A at the Bands of America Atlanta Super Regional.

The marching band was awarded two Grand Champion awards and 3rd place in The Heart of Dixie competition with their show "The Piano Lesson". The concert band made superior ratings at MPAs and went to Disney World to compete. They also had the opportunity to rename the school auditorium in honor of former band director Charles R. Stratford at their Spring Concert.

=== Percussion ===
The Muscle Shoals High School Percussion Ensemble has earned numerous awards as a member of the Southeastern Color Guard Circuit (SCGC) and Winter Guard International (WGI) since 2008. They have competed in the Percussion Scholastic Concert Open Class (PSCO) and the Percussion Scholastic Concert World Class (PSCW). The latter is for scholastic percussion groups that perform concert music programs of the highest difficulty in both SCGC and WGI. The Muscle Shoals Percussion Ensemble were WGI Scholastic Concert Open Champions in 2009 and 2022 and WGI Scholastic Concert World Champions in 2011.

==== Past and Current Programs ====
Year	Program Title	WGI Placement	Score	Class
2008	Samson & Delilah (featuring "Bachanalle")	3rd	93.10	PSCO
2009	Carmen	1st	97.30	PSCO
2010	Letters From War	3rd	93.88	PSCW
2011	Gershwin (featuring "Rhapsody in Blue")	1st	97.50	PSCW
2012	The Music of Howard Hanson	3rd	94.23	PSCW
2013	School for Scandal	2nd	94.45	PSCW
2014	Palace of Nine Perfections	3rd	92.65	PSCW
2015	5IVE	10th (Prelims)	78.55	PSA
2018	The Carmen Project	3rd	91.80	PSCW
2019	The Four Seasons Recomposed	6th	87.15	PSCW
2021	Angels and Demons	Cancelled due to COVID	—	—
2022	The Isle of Man (featuring "Mannin Veen")	1st	96.90	PSCO
2024	Pilatus: Mountain of Dragons	1st (SCGC, not WGI)	88.90	PSCO
2025	Carmen	4th	91.55	PSCO
2026	Eternal Sonata			

== Notable alumni ==
- Jason Allen – former cornerback for the Houston Texans, the Cincinnati Bengals, and the Miami Dolphins
- Adam Berry – reality television personality for Kindred Spirits, Ghost Hunters, and Ghost Hunters Academy
- Rece Davis – ESPN college football personality
- Dennis Homan – former wide receiver for the Dallas Cowboys and the Kansas City Chiefs
- Mark Sears – point guard for Alabama Crimson Tide men's basketball and Milwaukee Bucks
- Logan Smothers – college football quarterback
- Andrew Sorrell – politician
- Leigh Tiffin – former place kicker for the Alabama Crimson Tide
- Rachel Wammack – country music singer
