= Hawk Pride Mountain =

Summit in Colbert County, Alabama, U.S.

- Location within Alabama

Highest point
- Elevation: 817 ft (249 m)
- Listing: List of mountains of the United States
- Coordinates: 34°40′44″N 87°48′39″W

Geography
- Location: Alabama, U.S.
- Topo map: USGS Center Grove

Hawk Pride Mountain is a summit in Colbert County, Alabama, in the United States. With an elevation of 820 feet (250 m), is the 489th highest summit in the state of Alabama.

Hawk Pride Mountain takes its name from the local Pride family of settlers.
