= Dennis Homan =

American football player (born 1946)

No. 24, 21
- Position: Wide receiver

Personal information
- Born: January 9, 1946 (age 80); Muscle Shoals, Alabama, U.S.
- Listed height: 6 ft 1 in (1.85 m)
- Listed weight: 181 lb (82 kg)

Career information
- High school: Muscle Shoals
- College: Alabama
- NFL draft: 1968: 1st round, 20th overall pick

Career history
- Dallas Cowboys (1968–1970); Kansas City Chiefs (1971–1972); Birmingham Americans (1974); Birmingham Vulcans (1975)

Awards and highlights
- Consensus All-American (1967); First-team All-SEC (1967); Second-team All-SEC (1966)

Career NFL statistics
- Receptions: 37
- Receiving yards: 619
- Receiving touchdowns: 2
- Stats at Pro Football Reference

Dennis Frank Homan (born January 9, 1946) is an American former professional football player who was a wide receiver in the National Football League (NFL) for five seasons for the Dallas Cowboys (1968–1970) and the Kansas City Chiefs (1971–1972). He later played for the Birmingham Americans (1974) and Birmingham Vulcans (1975) of the World Football League (WFL) He is most proud of his children and grandchildren.

== Early life ==
Homan attended Muscle Shoals High School where he practiced football, basketball and baseball. In 2005, the Muscle Shoals City School System honored Homan by naming the field of James F. Moore Stadium, Dennis Homan Field. Homan played on the school's first football team and is the first Muscle Shoals High School player to be drafted into the NFL. He also was inducted into the Colbert County Sports Hall of Fame.

He accepted a football scholarship to the University of Alabama, where he was a member of the 1965 National Championship team and the 1966 undefeated season. He was originally recruited as a running back. As a sophomore, he had 10 receptions for 298 yards and 4 touchdowns. As a junior, he became a starter at split end, playing alongside Ray Perkins, while registering 23 receptions for 377 and 5 touchdowns.

As a senior, he was named consensus All-American and Academic All-American, after making 54 receptions for 820 yards and 9 touchdowns. He also played in the Senior Bowl, where he was the MVP of the South team.

During his collegiate career, he registered 87 receptions for 1,495 yards and set the school's career touchdown record with 18. In 1988, he was inducted into the Alabama Circle of Champions and in 1999, he was inducted into the Alabama Sports Hall of Fame.

== Professional career ==
=== Dallas Cowboys ===
Homan was selected by the Dallas Cowboys in the first round (20th overall) of the 1968 NFL draft. In his three years with the team, his best season came in 1969, when he had 12 receptions for 240 yards (20 yard avg.) and no touchdowns. He was a member of the Super Bowl V team that lost to the Baltimore Colts.

His preseason performances in 1970 won him the starting wide receiver job over Bob Hayes for 5 games, before Hayes regained his starting job. When troubled Lance Rentzel was separated from the team, Homan was passed over by former undrafted free agent Reggie Rucker for the last two games of the regular season, the Cowboys' playoff drive and its narrow Super Bowl V loss to the Baltimore Colts. At the end of the season, he asked to be traded, so he was sent to the Kansas City Chiefs in exchange for wide receiver Gloster Richardson.

=== Kansas City Chiefs ===
Homan decided to retire after experiencing two disappointing seasons and his trade requests were not being accepted by the Kansas City Chiefs.

=== World Football League ===
He returned to professional football with the Birmingham Americans of the World Football League, where he became one of the league's top wide receivers. In 1974, he had 61 receptions for 930 yards, 8 touchdowns and 2 action points, helping the Americans finish with a 15–5 regular season record and the World Football League championship.

In 1975, the Americans were replaced as the Birmingham WFL franchise by a new team called the Birmingham Vulcans. The WFL folded in mid-season, after he recorded 18 receptions for 277 yards, while playing in a run-oriented offense.
