= Jason Allen (American football) =

American football player (born 1983)

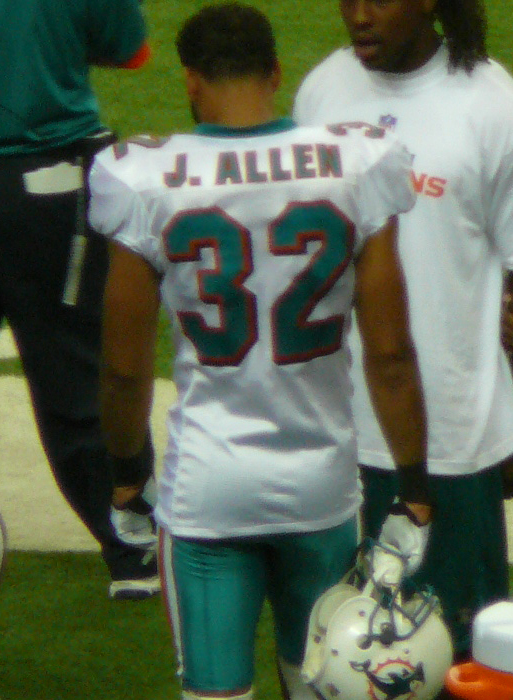
- Allen with the Miami Dolphins in 2009

No. 32, 30, 25
- Position: Cornerback

Personal information
- Born: July 5, 1983 (age 43); Muscle Shoals, Alabama, U.S.
- Listed height: 6 ft 1 in (1.85 m)
- Listed weight: 200 lb (91 kg)

Career information
- High school: Muscle Shoals (AL)
- College: Tennessee (2002–2005)
- NFL draft: 2006: 1st round, 16th overall pick

Career history
- Miami Dolphins (2006–2010); Houston Texans (2010–2011); Cincinnati Bengals (2012)

Awards and highlights
- Third-team All-American (2004); First-team All-SEC (2004); Alabama Gatorade Player of the Year (2001)

Career NFL statistics
- Total tackles: 247
- Forced fumbles: 1
- Fumble recoveries: 1
- Pass deflections: 34
- Interceptions: 15
- Stats at Pro Football Reference

Jason Jamar Allen (born July 5, 1983) is an American former professional football player who was a cornerback in the National Football League (NFL). He was selected by the Miami Dolphins 16th overall of the 2006 NFL draft. He played college football at Tennessee. Allen also played for the Houston Texans and Cincinnati Bengals.

== Early life ==
Allen earned various honors while playing football at Muscle Shoals High School in Muscle Shoals, Alabama. He was named an All-American from SuperPrep, PrepStar and Borderwars.com. He was twice a 5A All-State running back and was once selected as the Alabama Gatorade Player of the Year. As a senior, he ran for 1,740 yards and 21 touchdowns while adding 378 yards and three scores receiving. His performance earned him the honor of being the No. 1 player in Alabama by Birmingham News and Mobile Register.

Allen also lettered in track and basketball at Muscle Shoals. He graduated early in January 2001.

== College career ==
Allen was a four-year letterman and three-year starter for the Tennessee Volunteers. He appeared in 43 games with 26 starting, including 12 starts at safety and 14 at cornerback.

=== 2002 ===
By graduating in January, Allen was able to attend spring practices at the University of Tennessee. He went on to play in 13 games as a true freshman in 2002, finishing with five tackles.

=== 2003 ===
As a starting cornerback in 2003, Allen started 8 of the 13 games in which he appeared, amassing 57 tackles (43 solo), a forced fumble, 2 interceptions, 11 passes defensed, and a blocked kick. His first career interception sealed the win against Marshall. His breakout came against the University of Alabama, in which he had 12 tackles, a blocked field goal and 2 pass breakups; including the game-sealing one on fourth-and-two in the fifth overtime.

=== 2004 ===
Allen started the first game of the season at cornerback before moving to safety for the final 12 contests. He finished with 123 tackles, which led the SEC while also becoming the first non-linebacker to lead the team in tackles since individual records began being recorded in 1970. His 88 solo stops were third in the nation (among Division I-A schools). Along with his tackles, he totaled 2 sacks, 3 forced fumbles, a fumble recovery, 2 interceptions and 7 passes defensed during the year.

For his performance during the season, Allen was a third-team Associated Press All-America selection, second-team All-SEC Coaches and Associated Press selection, and a Jim Thorpe Award semifinalist. He also earned Walter Camp Division I-A Defensive Player of the Week honors on October 23.

=== 2005 ===
Allen suffered a season-ending dislocated hip in the fifth game of the season in 2005 while tackling University of Georgia tight end Leonard Pope. Prior to the injury, he recorded 35 tackles (28 solo) with a 10-yard sack, 3 stops for losses, a forced fumble, and deflected 2 passes.

== Professional career ==
Pre-draft measurables
Height	Weight	Arm length	Hand span	40-yard dash	10-yard split	20-yard split	20-yard shuttle	Three-cone drill	Vertical jump	Broad jump	Bench press
6 ft 0 7/8 in (1.85 m)	209 lb (95 kg)	31 1/2 in (0.80 m)	8 in (0.20 m)	4.44 s	1.52 s	2.56 s	3.81 s	6.75 s	39.5 in (1.00 m)	10 ft 11 in (3.33 m)	17 reps
All values from NFL Combine

=== Miami Dolphins ===
Allen was drafted by the Miami Dolphins in the first round with the 16th overall pick in the 2006 NFL draft. In Week 9 of the 2006 season, he recorded his first NFL interception in the victory over the Chicago Bears. As a rookie, he finished with 20 tackles, one interception, and two passes defended.

Jason Allen was released by the Dolphins on November 10, 2010.

=== Houston Texans ===
Allen was claimed off waivers by the Houston Texans on November 11, 2010. He finished tied for fifth in interceptions in the 2010 season with six.

=== Cincinnati Bengals ===
Allen signed with the Cincinnati Bengals on March 17, 2012. He was released by the Cincinnati Bengals on April 10, 2013.

== NFL career statistics ==
Legend
**Bold**	Career high

=== Regular season ===
Year	Team	Games		Tackles					Interceptions					Fumbles			
Year	Team	GP	GS	Cmb	Solo	Ast	Sck	TFL	Int	Yds	TD	Lng	PD	FF	FR	Yds	TD
2006	MIA	**16**	0	20	15	5	0.0	0	1	7	0	7	2	0	0	0	0
2007	MIA	**16**	**9**	**62**	**55**	7	0.0	0	3	15	0	13	3	**1**	0	0	0
2008	MIA	15	2	36	33	3	0.0	0	1	2	0	2	4	0	**1**	0	0
2009	MIA	**16**	1	22	20	2	0.0	0	0	0	0	0	2	0	0	0	0
2010	MIA	8	7	32	22	**10**	0.0	0	3	17	0	17	8	0	0	0	0
2010	HOU	7	0	27	24	3	0.0	0	3	1	0	1	4	0	0	0	0
2011	HOU	**16**	4	45	41	4	0.0	**2**	**4**	**34**	0	**34**	**11**	0	0	0	0
2012	CIN	4	0	3	3	0	0.0	0	0	0	0	0	0	0	0	0	0
Career		98	23	247	213	34	0.0	2	15	76	0	34	34	1	1	0	0

=== Playoffs ===
Year	Team	Games		Tackles					Interceptions					Fumbles			
Year	Team	GP	GS	Cmb	Solo	Ast	Sck	TFL	Int	Yds	TD	Lng	PD	FF	FR	Yds	TD
2008	MIA	1	0	0	0	0	0.0	0	0	0	0	0	0	0	0	0	0
2011	HOU	**2**	0	**6**	**4**	**2**	0.0	0	0	0	0	0	**2**	0	0	0	0
Career		3	0	6	4	2	0.0	0	0	0	0	0	2	0	0	0	0
