= Nitrate City, Alabama =

Unincorporated community in Alabama, United States

- Unincorporated community
- Location in Alabama.
- Coordinates: 34°45′26″N 87°33′35″W
- Country: United States
- State: Alabama
- County: Colbert
- Elevation: 571 ft (174 m)
- Time zone: UTC-6 (Central (CST))
  - Summer (DST): UTC-5 (CDT)
- Area code: 256

Nitrate City is an unincorporated community in Colbert County, Alabama, United States.

== See also ==
- International Fertilizer Development Center
- Nitrate Plant Number 1 Reservation Subdivision
