= Sheffield High School (Alabama) =

Coordinates: 34.769539°N 87.690425°W

Location
- 2800 E. 19th Avenue; Sheffield, Alabama 35660; United States

Information
- Type: Public
- School district: Sheffield City Schools
- CEEB code: 012455
- Principal: Marcus Rice
- Teaching staff: 21.25 (FTE)
- Enrollment: 281 (2023-2024)
- Student to teacher ratio: 13.22
- Colors: Purple and gold
- Mascot: Bulldog
- Website: shs.scs.k12.al.us

Sheffield High School is the sole public secondary education institution in Sheffield, Alabama.

== Curriculum ==
Sheffield High School awards an advanced diploma, a standard diploma, an occupational diploma, and a certificate of attendance. The advanced diploma and the standard diploma are awarded to students who acquire the required credits (Carnegie units) in a defined program and also pass the Alabama High School Graduation Exam.

The certificate of attendance is awarded to students who acquire the required credits (Carnegie units) for the standard diploma but fail to pass the Alabama High School Graduation Exam. The occupational diploma prepares students with disabilities for competitive employment.

SHS utilizes the block schedule, which enables students to take eight classes each year. Technical courses are available at area vocational schools. Qualifying students may also attend the University of North Alabama and Northwest Shoals Community College in their dual enrollment/dual credit programs.

A variety of electives are available to SHS students including Latin, Spanish, Art, Band, Choral Music, Mass Communications, Theater Arts, and Swimming.
