= Muscle Shoals, Alabama =

City in the United States

Muscle Shoals
- City
- Flag Seal

- Location of Muscle Shoals in Colbert County, Alabama
- Coordinates: 34°45′30″N 87°38′10″W
- Country: United States
- State: Alabama
- County: Colbert
- Established: April 23, 1923
- Incorporated: April 24, 1923

Government
  - Type: Mayor/Council

Area
  - City: 16.82 sq mi (43.57 km^{2})
  - Land: 16.80 sq mi (43.52 km^{2})
  - Water: 0.019 sq mi (0.05 km^{2})
- Elevation: 525 ft (160 m)

Population (2020)
  - City: 16,275
  - Density: 968.6/sq mi (373.96/km^{2})
  - Metro: 147,317 (US: 281st)
- Time zone: UTC−6 (Central Time Zone)
  - Summer (DST): UTC−5 (CDT)
- ZIP Codes: 35660 (obsolete), 35661–35662
- Area codes: 256, 938
- FIPS code: 01-53016
- GNIS feature ID: 2404345
- Website: www.cityofmuscleshoals.com

Muscle Shoals is the largest city in Colbert County, Alabama, United States. It is located on the left bank of the Tennessee River in the northern part of the state and, as of the 2020 census, Muscle Shoals had a population of 16,275. The estimated population in 2019 was 14,575.

Both the city and the Florence–Muscle Shoals Metropolitan Area (including four cities in Colbert and Lauderdale counties) are commonly called "The Shoals". Northwest Alabama Regional Airport in Muscle Shoals serves the Shoals region.

== Etymology ==
There are several explanations as to how the city got its name. One is that it was named after a former natural feature of the Tennessee River, a shallow zone where mussels were gathered and settlers named, and spelled, "Muscle Shoals". When the area was first settled, the proper spelling of "mussel" to refer to the shellfish had not been locally adopted. Cherokee people knew this place as ᏓᎫᎾᏱ (Dagunahi), or "the place of clams or mussels," from daguna (mussel) and -hi (place).

== History ==
In the late 18th and early 19th centuries, as Europeans entered the area in greater number, it became a center of historic land disputes. The new state of Georgia had ambitions to anchor its western claims (to the Mississippi River) by encouraging development here, but that project did not succeed.

Under President Franklin D. Roosevelt's administration during the Great Depression, the Tennessee Valley Authority was established to create infrastructure and jobs, resulting in electrification of a large rural area along the river. The Ford Motor Company built and operated a plant for many years in the Listerhill community, three miles east of Muscle Shoals; it closed in 1982 as part of industrial restructuring when jobs moved out of the country.

The area of Muscle Shoals was a part of the historic Cherokee hunting grounds dating to at least the early eighteenth century, if not earlier. In the early 18th century, Muscle Shoals was the site of a French trading post. In 1783, six prominent North Carolinians (William Blount, Richard Caswell, Griffith Rutherford, John Donelson, Joseph Martin, John Sevier) formed a company for the purposes of establishing a colony at Muscle Shoals.

Many Cherokee fought against the rebels during the late American Revolutionary War, hoping to expel them from their territories. After the Revolution, Cherokee attitudes toward the new U.S. republic were divided, as settlers increasingly encroached on their territory. An anti-American faction, dubbed the Chickamauga, separated from more conciliatory Cherokees, and moved into present-day south-central and southeastern Tennessee. Most of this band settled along the Chickamauga Creek, from which their name was derived. They claimed Muscle Shoals as part of their domain. When Anglo-Americans attempted to settle the region in the 1780s and 1790s, the Chickamaugas bitterly resisted them.

The Upper Creek, residing in what became north and central Alabama, also resented any European or Euro-American presence in the region. A major incident occurred in 1790, when U.S. President George Washington sent an expedition under Major John Doughty in an attempt to establish a fort and trading post at Muscle Shoals. This expedition was nearly annihilated by a Chickamauga and Creek party sent to destroy it, and the administration abandoned the project. Meanwhile, Francisco Luis Hector de Carondelet, governor of the Spanish Louisiana, was in conversations with the Indian confederation to establish a fort in 1792.

Anglo-American settlers in Tennessee continued to agitate for control of this region. The site was particularly desirable, as it controlled access to fine cotton-producing land immediately to its south. In 1797, John Sevier, the first governor of Tennessee, complained to Andrew Jackson that "The prevention of a settlement at or near the Muscle Shoals is a manifest injury done the whole western country." At Sevier's behest, Jackson attempted to persuade Congress and President John Adams to fund a new expedition to take control of the site, but to no avail.

U.S. officials finally took control of the region through a land purchase from the Cherokee in 1807, followed by the Chickasaw in 1817. Fort Hampton was built in neighboring Limestone County to protect both native and Anglo interests. Muscle Shoals was later used as a site from which to exile the Upper Creek to Indian Territory (now Oklahoma).

During World War I President Wilson authorized a dam on the Tennessee River just downstream of Muscle Shoals to help power nitrate plants for munitions. The first plant started producing nitrates two weeks after the armistice, but the dam was not completed until 1924.

Meanwhile, in 1922 Henry Ford tried to buy the nitrate works and the unfinished dam. The Michigan car manufacturer and industrialist proposed leasing the uncompleted hydro-electric dam at Muscle Shoals on the Tennessee River in Alabama. The US War Department had begun the project during World War I, and engineers estimated a cost of $40 million to complete. At this time, public projects were financed either through raising taxes—which, Congress was unwilling to do at the time- or by issuing bonds. For the Muscle Shoals project, the proposal was for 30-year bonds at 4% interest.

Ford and his friend and fellow inventor Thomas Edison balked at the idea that the US government should have to pay $48 million in interest on top of the $40 million they would have to pay back—all for a project that would benefit the public (the argument being that the hydro-electric dam and accompanying fertilizer plants would create jobs and revitalize the area). Responding to the bond issue, Edison remarked: "Any time we wish to add to the national wealth, we are compelled to add to the national debt." Edison and Ford hoped that a new monetary system could be created where dollar bills were issued directly to workers and manufacturer, with the money being backed by the goods they produced rather than the gold and silver held in bank vaults. Congress eventually rejected Ford's idea.

The project of area development based on hydroelectric power languished until the Great Depression. President Franklin D. Roosevelt's administration created the Tennessee Valley Authority in 1933 to construct needed infrastructure and install an electrical system in the rural area, using newly generated electricity from the dam complex.

== Music ==
Residents in Muscle Shoals created two studios that have recorded many hit songs since the 1960s. These are FAME Studios, founded by Rick Hall, where Arthur Alexander, Percy Sledge, Aretha Franklin, Wilson Pickett, Otis Redding and numerous others recorded; and Muscle Shoals Sound Studio, founded by the musicians known as The Swampers. They worked with Bob Dylan, Paul Simon, Rod Stewart, the Rolling Stones, The Allman Brothers, and others.

In addition to the city being home to country music band Shenandoah, it has been a destination of numerous artists to write and record. Both FAME Studios and Muscle Shoals Sound Studio are still in operation in the city. They recorded such recent hit songs such as "Before He Cheats" by Carrie Underwood and "I Loved Her First" by Heartland, continuing the city's musical legacy. George Michael recorded an early, unreleased version of "Careless Whisper" with Jerry Wexler in Muscle Shoals in 1983. Bettye LaVette recorded her Grammy nominated album "Scene of the Crime" at FAME in 1972.

The original Muscle Shoals Sound Studios were located at 3614 Jackson Highway in Sheffield but that site was closed in 1979 when the studio relocated to 1000 Alabama Avenue in Sheffield. The studio in the Alabama Avenue building closed in 2005; as of 2018 it houses a movie production company, which also hosts tours and concerts at the venue.

Muscle Shoals encouraged the cross-pollination of musical styles: black artists from the area, such as Arthur Alexander and James Carr, used white country music styles in their work, and white artists from the Shoals frequently borrowed from the blues/gospel influences of their black contemporaries, creating a distinct sound.

Sam Phillips, founder of Sun Records, was born in and lived in the area. He stated that the Muscle Shoals radio station WLAY (AM), which played both "white" and "black" music, and where he worked as a disc jockey in the 1940s, influenced his merging of these sounds at Sun Records with Elvis Presley, Jerry Lee Lewis, and Johnny Cash.

Rolling Stone editor David Fricke wrote that if one wanted to play a single recording that would "epitomize and encapsulate the famed Muscle Shoals Sound", that record would be "I'll Take You There" by The Staple Singers in 1972. After hearing that song, American songwriter Paul Simon phoned his manager and asked him to arrange a recording session with the musicians who had performed it. Simon was surprised to learn that he would have to travel to Muscle Shoals to work with the artists. After arriving in the small town, he was introduced to the Muscle Shoals Rhythm Section ("The Swampers") who had recorded this song with Mavis Staples. Expecting black musicians (the original Rhythm Section consisted only of white musicians), and assuming that he had been introduced to the office staff, Simon politely asked to "meet the band". Once things were sorted out, Simon recorded a number of tracks with the Muscle Shoals band, including "Kodachrome" and "Loves Me Like a Rock".

When Bob Dylan began to plan the recording of an album that would feature his new-found faith in Christ, he recruited veteran R&B producer Jerry Wexler and they agreed to use the Muscle Shoals studio. Wexler remembered: "Dylan came to me because he wanted the sonority he'd heard in Aretha and Otis as opposed to those out-of-time, see-you-down-the-line, thirteen-and-a-half-measure, out-of-time phrases." With Wexler, Dylan recorded two albums of contemporary gospel music, Slow Train Coming (1979) and Saved (1980).

In the early 21st century, Florence native Patterson Hood, son of "Swamper" David Hood, found fame as a member of the alternative rock group Drive-By Truckers. Siblings and Muscle Shoals natives Angela Hacker (winner) and Zac Hacker (second place) were the top two finishing finalists on the 2007 season of Nashville Star, a country-music singing competition. In 2008, State Line Mob, a Southern rock duo group formed by singer and songwriters Phillip Crunk (Florence native) and Dana Crunk (Rogersville native), released their first CD, Ruckus, and won two Muscle Shoals Music Awards for 2008 for (Best New Artist) and Best New Country Album) of the year. Band of Horses recorded a portion of their album Infinite Arms at Muscle Shoals. Artists signed to the FAME label in 2017 include Holli Mosley, Dylan LeBlanc, Jason Isbell, Angela Hacker, Gary Nichols, and James LeBlanc.

Although Muscle Shoals is no longer the "Hit Recording Capital of the World" (as it was in the 1960s and 1970s), the music continues. Groups and artists include Drive-By Truckers, The Civil Wars, Dylan LeBlanc, Gary Nichols, Jason Isbell, State Line Mob, Eric "Red Mouth" Gebhardt, Fiddleworms, and BoomBox.

A number of rock, R&B and country music celebrities have homes in the area surrounding Muscle Shoals (Tuscumbia), or riverside estates along the Tennessee River. They may be seen performing in area nightclubs, typically rehearsing new material.

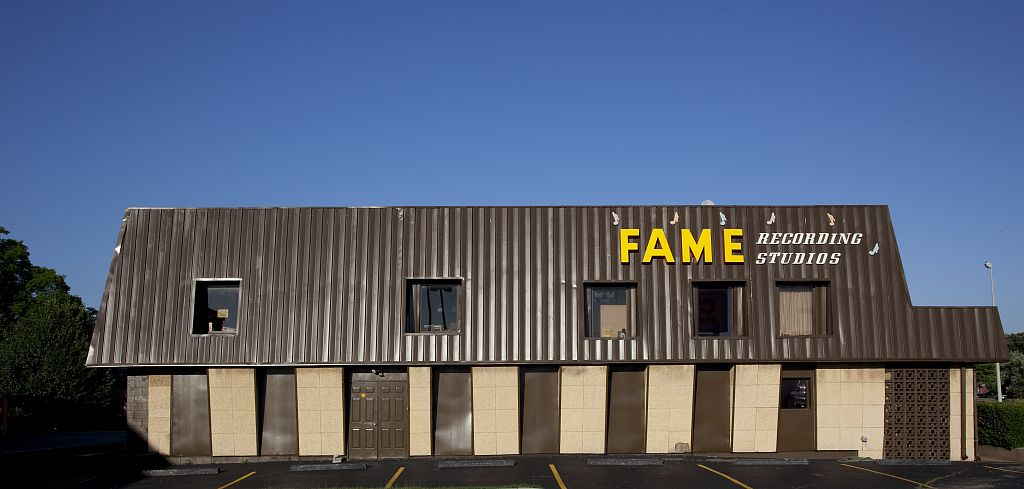
FAME Recording Studios in Muscle Shoals (photograph by Carol M. Highsmith)

Sister city Florence, Alabama, is frequently referred to as "the birthplace of the Blues". W. C. Handy was born in Florence and is generally regarded as the "Father of the Blues". Every year since 1982, the W. C. Handy Music Festival is held in the Florence/Sheffield/Muscle Shoals area, featuring blues, jazz, country, gospel, rock music and R&B. The roster of jazz musicians known as the "Festival All-Stars", or as the W. C. Handy Jazz All-Stars, includes musicians from all over the United States, such as guitarist Mundell Lowe, drummer Bill Goodwin, pianist/vocalist Johnny O'Neal, vibraphone player Chuck Redd, pianist/vocalist Ray Reach, and flutist Holly Hofmann.

On January 6, 2010, Muscle Shoals was added to the Mississippi Blues Trail.

After FAME studio founder Rick Hall died in early 2018, The New Yorker concluded its retrospective with this comment: "Muscle Shoals remains remarkable not just for the music made there but for its unlikeliness as an epicenter of anything; that a tiny town in a quiet corner of Alabama became a hotbed of progressive, integrated rhythm and blues still feels inexplicable. Whatever Hall conjured there—whatever he dreamt, and made real—is essential to any recounting of American ingenuity. It is a testament to a certain kind of hope." Al.com commented that Hall is survived by his family "and a Muscle Shoals music legacy like no other". An editorial in the Anniston Star concludes with this epitaph, "If the world wants to know about Alabama – a state seldom publicized for anything but college football and embarrassing politics – the late Rick Hall and his legacy are worthy models to uphold".

=== 3614 Jackson Highway Studio ===
The original location of Muscle Shoals Sound Studios in Sheffield has been listed on the National Register of Historic Places since June 2006. From the early 2000s to 2013, it had been partly restored and open for tours. In 2013, the documentary Muscle Shoals raised public interest in a major restoration of the original studio. In the same year, the Muscle Shoals Music Foundation was formed to raise funds to purchase the building and to complete major renovations. In June 2013, the owner of the property since 1999 sold it without the historic recording equipment to the Foundation.

A grant from Beats Electronics, a manufacturer of headphones owned by Apple Inc., and founded by Dr. Dre and Jimmy Iovine, provided an essential $1 million. The state tourism director said in 2015 that the 2013 film Muscle Shoals had been a significant influence. "The financial support from Beats is a direct result of their film." Additional donations were made by other groups and individuals.

As of August 2015, tours were visiting the partly-restored studio on Jackson Highway. It was closed when major restoration work started in September 2015. Muscle Shoals Sound Studio reopened as a finished tourist attraction on January 9, 2017. Owned and operated by the foundation, the interior is reminiscent of the 1970s, with relevant recording equipment and paraphernalia. There are plans for future recording projects.

Even before the Jackson Highway studio reopened, The Alabama Tourism Department named Muscle Shoals Sound Studio as the state's top attraction in 2017.

=== The Swampers ===
The members of the Muscle Shoals Rhythm Section were Pete Carr (lead guitar), Jimmy Johnson (rhythm guitar), Roger Hawkins (drums), David Hood (bass guitar) and Barry Beckett (keyboards).

Affectionately called The Swampers, the Muscle Shoals Rhythm Section was a local group of first-call studio musicians (initially working at FAME and then at Muscle Shoals Sound Studios) who were available for back-up. They were given the nickname The Swampers by music producer Denny Cordell during the Leon Russell sessions because of their "funky, soulful Southern 'swamp' sound".

A verse of the Lynyrd Skynyrd song "Sweet Home Alabama" contains references to the Swampers and their native town, Muscle Shoals: "Now Muscle Shoals has got the Swampers / And they've been known to pick a song or two."

== Geography ==
Muscle Shoals is located on the south bank of the Tennessee River.

According to the U.S. Census Bureau, the city has a total area of 15.6 square miles (40.3 km^{2}), of which 0.02 square miles (0.05 km^{2}), or 0.13%, is water. The local hardiness zone is 7b. Interactive Map | USDA Plant Hardiness Zone Map

=== Climate ===
Climate data for Muscle Shoals, Alabama (Northwest Alabama Regional Airport, 1991–2020 normals, (Note: Mean monthly maxima and minima (i.e. the expected highest and lowest temperature readings at any point during the year or given month) calculated based on data at said location from 1991 to 2020.) extremes 1893–present (Note: Records kept in nearby Florence, Alabama from January 1893 to November 1940, and at Northwest Alabama Regional Airport near Muscle Shoals since December 1940.))
Month	Jan	Feb	Mar	Apr	May	Jun	Jul	Aug	Sep	Oct	Nov	Dec	Year
Record high °F (°C)	80 (27)	86 (30)	99 (37)	97 (36)	99 (37)	108 (42)	108 (42)	108 (42)	108 (42)	100 (38)	89 (32)	78 (26)	108 (42)
Mean maximum °F (°C)	70.3 (21.3)	74.2 (23.4)	81.3 (27.4)	86.4 (30.2)	91.6 (33.1)	95.4 (35.2)	98.0 (36.7)	98.0 (36.7)	94.7 (34.8)	88.4 (31.3)	79.6 (26.4)	71.7 (22.1)	99.6 (37.6)
Mean daily maximum °F (°C)	52.4 (11.3)	56.7 (13.7)	65.2 (18.4)	74.4 (23.6)	82.1 (27.8)	88.9 (31.6)	91.6 (33.1)	91.2 (32.9)	86.1 (30.1)	75.7 (24.3)	63.8 (17.7)	55.0 (12.8)	73.6 (23.1)
Daily mean °F (°C)	42.9 (6.1)	46.7 (8.2)	54.4 (12.4)	62.9 (17.2)	71.3 (21.8)	78.4 (25.8)	81.5 (27.5)	80.5 (26.9)	74.7 (23.7)	63.6 (17.6)	52.5 (11.4)	45.6 (7.6)	62.9 (17.2)
Mean daily minimum °F (°C)	33.5 (0.8)	36.7 (2.6)	43.5 (6.4)	51.5 (10.8)	60.6 (15.9)	67.9 (19.9)	71.4 (21.9)	69.9 (21.1)	63.3 (17.4)	51.5 (10.8)	41.2 (5.1)	36.1 (2.3)	52.3 (11.3)
Mean minimum °F (°C)	14.5 (−9.7)	19.1 (−7.2)	26.0 (−3.3)	35.1 (1.7)	45.5 (7.5)	56.5 (13.6)	63.0 (17.2)	60.6 (15.9)	48.0 (8.9)	33.6 (0.9)	24.2 (−4.3)	20.5 (−6.4)	12.5 (−10.8)
Record low °F (°C)	−11 (−24)	−13 (−25)	7 (−14)	24 (−4)	32 (0)	42 (6)	49 (9)	47 (8)	36 (2)	23 (−5)	2 (−17)	−5 (−21)	−13 (−25)
Average precipitation inches (mm)	4.71 (120)	4.79 (122)	5.14 (131)	4.80 (122)	4.55 (116)	5.05 (128)	4.78 (121)	3.77 (96)	3.55 (90)	3.47 (88)	4.15 (105)	5.48 (139)	54.24 (1,378)
Average snowfall inches (cm)	0.4 (1.0)	1.0 (2.5)	0.4 (1.0)	0.0 (0.0)	0.0 (0.0)	0.0 (0.0)	0.0 (0.0)	0.0 (0.0)	0.0 (0.0)	0.0 (0.0)	0.0 (0.0)	0.4 (1.0)	2.2 (5.6)
Average precipitation days (≥ 0.01 in)	10.2	10.3	11.0	10.0	11.0	10.7	10.9	9.3	7.0	8.1	8.8	11.0	119.3
Average snowy days (≥ 0.1 in)	0.4	0.6	0.2	0.1	0.0	0.0	0.0	0.0	0.0	0.0	0.0	0.4	1.7
Source: NOAA (snow 1981–2010)

== Demographics ==
Historical population
Census	Pop.	Note	%±
1930	719		—
1940	1,113		54.8%
1950	1,937		74.0%
1960	4,084		110.8%
1970	6,907		69.1%
1980	8,911		29.0%
1990	9,611		7.9%
2000	11,924		24.1%
2010	13,156		10.3%
2020	16,275		23.7%
U.S. Decennial Census

=== 2020 census ===
As of the 2020 census, Muscle Shoals had a population of 16,275. The median age was 39.7 years. 23.3% of residents were under the age of 18 and 17.9% were 65 years of age or older. For every 100 females, there were 90.4 males, and for every 100 females age 18 and over, there were 85.9 males age 18 and over.

As of the 2020 census, 97.1% of residents lived in urban areas and 2.9% lived in rural areas.

As of the 2020 census, there were 6,686 households and 3,738 families in Muscle Shoals. Of all households, 32.5% had children under the age of 18 living in them, 49.3% were married-couple households, 16.0% were households with a male householder and no spouse or partner present, and 30.7% were households with a female householder and no spouse or partner present. About 28.0% of all households were made up of individuals, and 12.3% had someone living alone who was 65 years of age or older.

There were 7,094 housing units, of which 5.8% were vacant. The homeowner vacancy rate was 1.9% and the rental vacancy rate was 5.5%.

Muscle Shoals racial composition
Race	Num.	Perc.
White (non-Hispanic)	11,788	72.43%
Black or African American (non-Hispanic)	2,802	17.22%
Native American	79	0.49%
Asian	284	1.75%
Pacific Islander	1	0.01%
Other/Mixed	719	4.42%
Hispanic or Latino	602	3.7%

=== 2010 census ===
As of the census of 2010, there were 13,146 people, 5,321 households, and 3,769 families residing in the city. The population density was 845.4 inhabitants per square mile (326.4/km^{2}). There were 5,653 housing units at an average density of 363.5 per square mile (140.3/km^{2}). The racial makeup of the city was 80.6% White, 15.3% Black or African American, 0.3% Native American, 0.9% Asian, 1.3% from other races, and 1.6% Hawaiian or Pacific Islander. Hispanic or Latino of any race were 2.7% of the population.

There were 5,321 households, out of which 31.1% had children under the age of 18 living with them, 54.4% were married couples living together, 12.9% had a female householder with no husband present, and 29.2% were non-families. 26.2% of all households were made up of individuals, and 11.3% had someone living alone who was 65 years of age or older. The average household size was 2.44 and the average family size was 2.93.

In the city, the population was spread out, with 23.6% under the age of 18, 8.1% from 18 to 24, 24.9% from 25 to 44, 27.3% from 45 to 64, and 16.0% who were 65 years of age or older. The median age was 40.1 years. For every 100 females, there were 90.5 males. For every 100 females age 18 and over, there were 91.9 males.

The median income for a household in the city was $48,134, and the median income for a family was $60,875. Males had a median income of $41,061 versus $37,576 for females. The per capita income for the city was $23,237. About 8.3% of families and 10.6% of the population were below the poverty line, including 19.9% of those under age 18 and 4.8% of those age 65 or over.

=== 2000 census ===
As of the census of 2000, there were 11,924 people, 4,710 households and 3,452 families residing in the city. The population density was 979.7 inhabitants per square mile (378.3/km^{2}). There were 5,010 housing units at an average density of 411.6 per square mile (158.9/km^{2}). The racial makeup of the city was 83.88% White, 14.16% Black or African American, 0.38% Native American, 0.56% Asian, 0.31% from other races, and 0.70% from two or more races. Hispanic or Latino of any race were 1.16% of the population.

There were 4,710 households, out of which 34.7% had children under the age of 18 living with them, 59.4% were married couples living together, 11.3% had a female householder with no husband present, and 26.7% were non-families. 23.8% of all households were made up of individuals, and 8.2% had someone living alone who was 65 years of age or older. The average household size was 2.48 and the average family size was 2.95.

In the city, the population was spread out, with 24.8% under the age of 18, 8.6% from 18 to 24, 29.6% from 25 to 44, 23.9% from 45 to 64, and 13.1% who were 65 years of age or older. The median age was 37 years. For every 100 females, there were 88.9 males. For every 100 females age 18 and over, there were 86.1 males.

The median income for a household in the city was $40,210, and the median income for a family was $48,113. Males had a median income of $38,063 versus $21,933 for females. The per capita income for the city was $21,113. About 5.4% of families and 7.3% of the population were below the poverty line, including 8.1% of those under age 18 and 7.2% of those age 65 or over.

== Schools ==
The Muscle Shoals City School District is currently led by Superintendent Dr. Chad Holden. There are seven schools in the district:

- Muscle Shoals High School
- Muscle Shoals Career Academy
- Muscle Shoals Middle School
- McBride Elementary School
- Highland Park Elementary School
- Webster Elementary School
- Howell Graves Preschool

== Transportation ==
The city is served by Northwest Alabama Regional Airport, which is one mile east from the town and is served by one commercial airline.

The Northwest Alabama Council of Local Governments (NACOLG) provides demand-response transit services through NACOLG Transit within the Shoals Area.

== Representation in other media ==
- Muscle Shoals (2013) is an American documentary film about FAME Studios and Muscle Shoals Sound Studio in this city. Directed by Greg 'Freddy' Camalier, the film was released by Magnolia Pictures.
- Muscle Shoals is mentioned in the Lynyrd Skynyrd song Sweet Home Alabama, off their 1974 album Second Helping.

== People ==
- Jason Allen, University of Tennessee and NFL player
- Gary Baker, country music singer-songwriter
- Boyd Bennett, rockabilly singer
- Levi Colbert, Chickasaw Bench Chief
- Rece Davis, ESPN commentator (QB for the Trojans' football squad)
- Alecia Elliott, country music singer
- Donna Godchaux, singer for the Grateful Dead from 1972 to 1979
- Dennis Homan, Alabama All-America wide receiver and Dallas Cowboys' player
- Patterson Hood, singer-songwriter, co-founder of the Drive-By Truckers
- Ozzie Newsome, American football player
- Gary Nichols, country music singer
- Michael "Nick" Nichols, photographer
- Leigh Tiffin, American football placekicker
- Chris Tompkins, songwriter
- Steve Trash, magician
- Kim Tribble, country music songwriter
- Rachel Wammack, country music singer-songwriter
- John Wyker, musician
