= Deshler High School =

Deshler High School can refer to:

- Deshler High School (Alabama) in Tuscumbia, Alabama
- Deshler High School (Nebraska) in Deshler, Nebraska
