= Colbert County Courthouse Square Historic District =

Historic district in Alabama, United States

- U.S. National Register of Historic Places
- U.S. Historic district
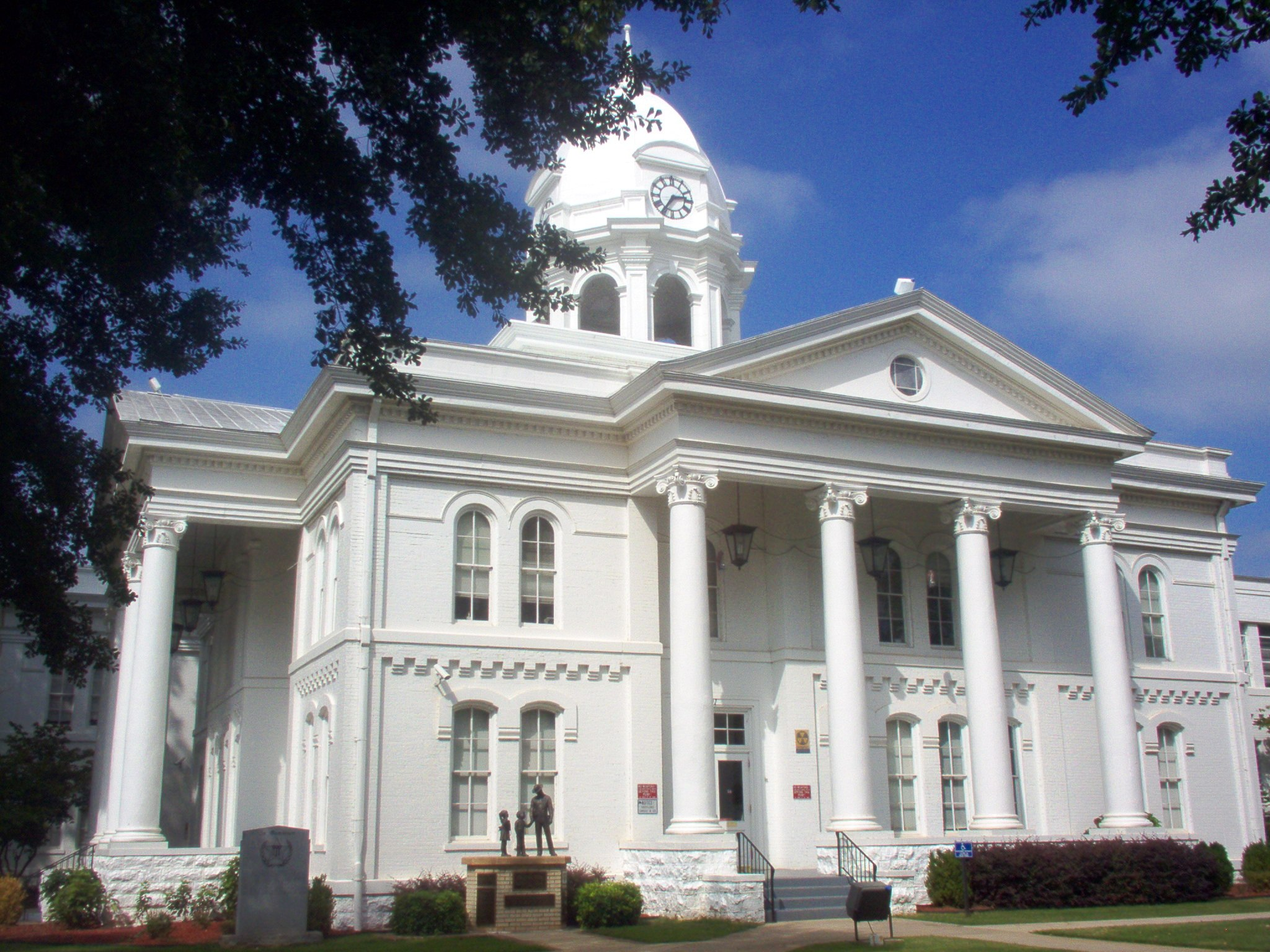
- The Colbert County Courthouse in September 2007

- Location within Alabama Location within the United States
- Location: Roughly bounded by E. and W. 2nd, N. and S. Cave, E. and W. 6th, and N. and S. Indian Sts., Tuscumbia, Alabama
- Coordinates: 34°44′2″N 87°42′15″W
- Area: 72 acres (29 ha)
- NRHP reference No.: 73000338
- Added to NRHP: May 24, 1973

The Colbert County Courthouse Square Historic District is a historic district in Tuscumbia, Alabama, United States. It contains 22 buildings and residences centered on the Colbert County Courthouse.

== History ==
The courthouse was built in 1881. It was heavily damaged by fire in 1908. In the restoration, porticos were added to each side, each with four Ionic columns. The west and north porticoes have since been removed to make way for expansion wings. A clock tower was also added after the 1908 fire.

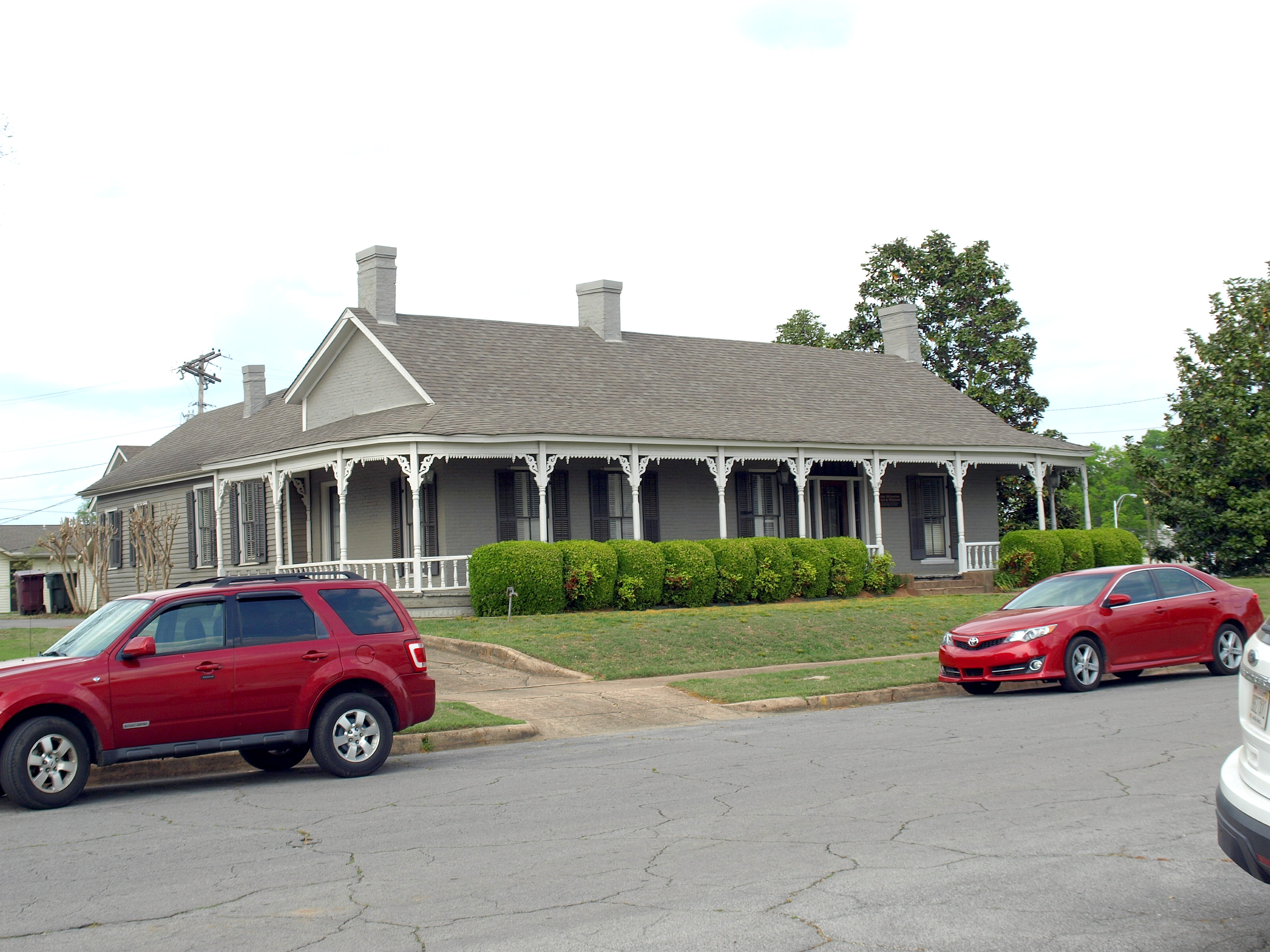
Godley House

On the east side of the courthouse across Main Street are the First Methodist Church (built 1926), the Clark Building (built 1926), and the Abernathy House. Single houses, now all used as law offices, mixed with modern infill face the courthouse on its other sides; the Godley House to the north was built in 1839, the Womble House to the west was built in the 1890s, and the Dirago House to the south was built in 1912.

Away from the courthouse square, the most significant structures are a group of seven buildings on 5th Street known collectively as Commercial Row. The buildings were constructed in the 1840s, and have served as the commercial hub of Tuscumbia. One block west of Commercial Row is the Railway Depot. The Tuscumbia Railroad Company was chartered in 1830 and had extended their line to Decatur by 1834. The Victorian depot was built in 1888 to replace a former frame structure, and given to the city in 1948. Other buildings in the district include the First Presbyterian Church (built 1824), St. John's Episcopal Church (built 1852), First Baptist Church (built 1903), and the Julian House (built in Cherokee and moved to Tuscumbia in the 1850s).

The district was listed on the National Register of Historic Places in 1973.
