= 2021 Troy Trojans football team =

American college football season

2021 Troy Trojans football
- Conference: Sun Belt Conference
- East Division
- Record: 5–7 (3–5 Sun Belt)
- Head coach: Chip Lindsey (3rd season; first 11 games); Brandon Hall (interim, final game)
- Offensive coordinator: Luke Meadows (1st season)
- Offensive scheme: Spread
- Defensive coordinator: Brandon Hall (3rd season)
- Base defense: 4–3
- Home stadium: Veterans Memorial Stadium

2021 Sun Belt Conference football standings
	Conf.			Overall
Team	W		L	W		L
East Division
Appalachian State xy	7	–	1	10	–	4
Georgia State	6	–	2	8	–	5
Coastal Carolina	6	–	2	11	–	2
Troy	3	–	5	5	–	7
Georgia Southern	2	–	6	3	–	9
West Division
No. 16 Louisiana xy$	8	–	0	13	–	1
Texas State	3	–	5	4	–	8
Louisiana–Monroe	2	–	6	4	–	8
South Alabama	2	–	6	5	–	7
Arkansas State	1	–	7	2	–	10
Championship: Louisiana 24, Appalachian State 16
$ – Conference champion; x – Division champion/co-champions; y – Championship game participant; Rankings from AP Poll

The 2021 Troy Trojans football team represented Troy University in the 2021 NCAA Division I FBS football season. The Trojans played their home games at Veterans Memorial Stadium in Troy, Alabama, and competed in the East Division of the Sun Belt Conference.

Prior to the season, Luke Meadows took over as the team's offensive coordinator after the departure of Ryan Pugh.

== Preseason ==
=== Recruiting class ===
College recruiting
Name	Hometown	School	Height	Weight	40^{‡}	Commit date
Lawson Chandler; OL	Bainbridge, GA	Bainbridge HS	6 ft 4 in (1.93 m)	320 lb (150 kg)	–	Dec 16, 2020
Lawson Chandler; OL	Recruit ratings: Scout: Rivals: 247Sports: ESPN:					
Jamarcus Chatman; DE	Rome, GA	Rome HS; Florida State	6 ft 2 in (1.88 m)	271 lb (123 kg)	–	Dec 16, 2020
Jamarcus Chatman; DE	Recruit ratings: Scout: Rivals: 247Sports: ESPN:					
Ollie Finch; WR	Attalla, AL	Etowah HS	6 ft 2 in (1.88 m)	175 lb (79 kg)	–	Dec 16, 2020
Ollie Finch; WR	Recruit ratings: Scout: Rivals: 247Sports: ESPN:					
Cherokee Glasgow; DT	Mount Vernon, NY	Mount Vernon HS; Maryland	6 ft 2 in (1.88 m)	280 lb (130 kg)	–	Feb 3, 2021
Cherokee Glasgow; DT	Recruit ratings: Scout: Rivals: 247Sports: ESPN:					
Kyran Griffin-Isom; WR	New Orleans, LA	West Creek HS; Palomar College	6 ft 3 in (1.91 m)	175 lb (79 kg)	–	Dec 16, 2020
Kyran Griffin-Isom; WR	Recruit ratings: Scout: Rivals: 247Sports: ESPN:					
Quayde Hawkins; QB	Bainbridge, GA	Bainbridge HS	6 ft 1 in (1.85 m)	190 lb (86 kg)	–	Dec 16, 2020
Quayde Hawkins; QB	Recruit ratings: Scout: Rivals: 247Sports: ESPN:					
Peyton Higgins; WR	Florience, AL	Mars Hill Bible	5 ft 10 in (1.78 m)	180 lb (82 kg)	–	Dec 16, 2020
Peyton Higgins; WR	Recruit ratings: Scout: Rivals: 247Sports: ESPN:					
Phillip Lee; LB	Jacksonville, FL	First Coast HS	6 ft 4 in (1.93 m)	215 lb (98 kg)	–	Dec 16, 2020
Phillip Lee; LB	Recruit ratings: Scout: Rivals: 247Sports: ESPN:					
Taiyon Palmer; CB	Lawrenceville, GA	Archer HS; NC State	5 ft 11 in (1.80 m)	185 lb (84 kg)	–	Dec 16, 2020
Taiyon Palmer; CB	Recruit ratings: Scout: Rivals: 247Sports: ESPN:					
Julian Peterson; DT	Pinson, AL	Pinson Valley HS	6 ft 3 in (1.91 m)	295 lb (134 kg)	–	Dec 16, 2020
Julian Peterson; DT	Recruit ratings: Scout: Rivals: 247Sports: ESPN:					
Taylor Powell; QB	Fayetteville, AR	Fayetteville HS; Missouri	6 ft 2 in (1.88 m)	210 lb (95 kg)	–	Dec 16, 2020
Taylor Powell; QB	Recruit ratings: Scout: Rivals: 247Sports: ESPN:					
Caleb Ransaw; CB	Harvest, AL	Sparkman HS	6 ft 0 in (1.83 m)	185 lb (84 kg)	–	Dec 16, 2020
Caleb Ransaw; CB	Recruit ratings: Scout: Rivals: 247Sports: ESPN:					
Scott Taylor Renfroe; K	Troy, AL	Pike Liberal Arts	6 ft 1 in (1.85 m)	176 lb (80 kg)	–	Dec 16, 2020
Scott Taylor Renfroe; K	Recruit ratings: Scout: Rivals: 247Sports: ESPN:					
Sterling Roberts; S	Starke, FL	Bradford HS	6 ft 1 in (1.85 m)	205 lb (93 kg)	–	Dec 16, 2020
Sterling Roberts; S	Recruit ratings: Scout: Rivals: 247Sports: ESPN:					
Ivan Shultz; OL	Mobile, AL	St. Paul's Episcopal	6 ft 4 in (1.93 m)	295 lb (134 kg)	–	Dec 16, 2020
Ivan Shultz; OL	Recruit ratings: Scout: Rivals: 247Sports: ESPN:					
Deshon Stoudemire; WR	Stone Mountain, GA	Stephenson HS; Iowa Western CC	6 ft 1 in (1.85 m)	175 lb (79 kg)	–	Dec 16, 2020
Deshon Stoudemire; WR	Recruit ratings: Scout: Rivals: 247Sports: ESPN:					
Jordan Stringer; LB	Augusta, GA	Laney HS	6 ft 2 in (1.88 m)	215 lb (98 kg)	–	Dec 16, 2020
Jordan Stringer; LB	Recruit ratings: Scout: Rivals: 247Sports: ESPN:					
Damien Taylor; RB	Northport, AL	Tuscaloosa County HS	5 ft 10 in (1.78 m)	180 lb (82 kg)	–	Dec 16, 2020
Damien Taylor; RB	Recruit ratings: Scout: Rivals: 247Sports: ESPN:					
Jarris Williams; RB	Mobile, AL	Blount HS	5 ft 10 in (1.78 m)	192 lb (87 kg)	–	Dec 16, 2020
Jarris Williams; RB	Recruit ratings: Scout: Rivals: 247Sports: ESPN:					

=== Award watch lists ===
Listed in the order that they were released

==== Preseason ====
Award	Player	Position	Year
Chuck Bednarik Award	Carlton Martial	LB	JR
Doak Walker Award	Kimani Vidal	RB	FR
Rimington Trophy	Dylan Bradshaw	OL	SR
Butkus Award	Carlton Martial	LB	JR
Bronko Nagurski Award	Carlton Martial	LB	JR
Outland Trophy	Will Choloh	DT	JR

=== Sun Belt coaches poll ===
The Sun Belt coaches poll was released on July 20, 2021. The Trojans were picked to finish fifth in the East Division.

=== Sun Belt Preseason All-Conference teams ===
Offense

1st team

- Austin Stidham – Offensive Lineman, JR

2nd team

- Dylan Bradshaw – Offensive Lineman, SR

Defense

1st team

- Will Choloh – Defensive Lineman, JR
- Carlton Martial – Linebacker, JR

== Schedule ==
The 2021 schedule consisted of 6 home and 6 away games in the regular season. The Trojans would travel to Sun Belt foes Louisiana–Monroe, Texas State, Coastal Carolina, and Georgia State. Troy would play host to Sun Belt foes Georgia Southern, South Alabama, Louisiana, and Appalachian State.

Troy would host two of the four non-conference opponents at Veterans Memorial Stadium, Southern, from NCAA Division I FCS Southwestern Athletic Conference and Liberty, a FBS Independent, and would travel to Southern Miss of the Conference USA and South Carolina of the Southeastern Conference.

Date	Time	Opponent	Site	TV	Result	Attendance
September 4	6:00 p.m.	Southern*	Veterans Memorial Stadium; Troy, AL	ESPN3	W 55–3	22,399
September 11	6:00 p.m.	Liberty*	Veterans Memorial Stadium; Troy, AL	ESPN+	L 13–21	24,714
September 18	6:00 p.m.	at Southern Miss*	M. M. Roberts Stadium; Hattiesburg, MS	ESPN+	W 21–9	24,242
September 25	7:00 p.m.	at Louisiana–Monroe	Malone Stadium; Monroe, LA	ESPN+	L 16–29	12,766
October 2	2:30 p.m.	at South Carolina*	Williams–Brice Stadium; Columbia, SC	SECN	L 14–23	60,686
October 9	6:00 p.m.	Georgia Southern	Veterans Memorial Stadium; Troy, AL	ESPN+	W 27–24	25,424
October 16	2:00 p.m.	at Texas State	Bobcat Stadium; San Marcos, TX	ESPN+	W 31–28	15,083
October 28	6:30 p.m.	at No. 24 Coastal Carolina	Brooks Stadium; Conway, SC	ESPN2	L 28–35	11,689
November 6	2:30 p.m.	South Alabama	Veterans Memorial Stadium; Troy, AL (rivalry)	ESPN+	W 31–24	26,211
November 13	2:30 p.m.	Louisiana^{†}	Veterans Memorial Stadium; Troy, AL	ESPN+	L 21–35	24,738
November 20	2:30 p.m.	Appalachian State	Veterans Memorial Stadium; Troy, AL	ESPN+	L 7–45	18,523
November 27	1:00 p.m.	at Georgia State	Center Parc Stadium; Atlanta, GA	ESPN+	L 10–37	13,875
*Non-conference game; ^{†}Homecoming; Rankings from AP Poll and CFP Rankings after November 24 released prior to game; All times are in Central time

== Personnel ==
2021 Troy Trojans football team roster
Players
Coaches
Offense

Pos.	#	Name	Class
RB	0	Kimani Vidal	Fr
RB	1	Jamontez Woods	Fr
WR	2	Reggie Todd	Sr
WR	4	Marcus Rogers	Jr
WR	5	Jabre Barber	Fr
QB	7	Taylor Powell	Jr
QB	9	Quayde Hawkins	Fr
TE	9	Tre' Ross	Fr
WR	10	Luke Whittemore	Jr
WR	11	Deshon Stoudemire	So
WR	14	Orlando Lacey	Jr
WR	15	Tez Johnson	Fr
WR	16	Peyton Higgins	Fr
QB	17	Kyle Toole	Fr
QB	18	Gunnar Watson	So
RB	20	DK Billingsley	Jr
RB	21	Jarris Williams	Fr
RB	24	Damien Taylor	Fr
RB	25	Josh Mays	So
RB	26	B. J. Smith	Sr
WR	27	Robert Marsh	Fr
RB	28	Charles Strong	So
OL	51	Chase Little	Fr
OL	53	Bubba Hudson	Jr
OL	55	Jake Andrews	So
OL	58	Logan Self	Fr
OL	60	Douglas Thompson	Fr
OL	63	Carson Burt	Fr
OL	64	DeAndre Butler	Jr
OL	65	Dylan Bradshaw	Sr
OL	67	Grant Betts	So
OL	68	Ivan Shultz	Fr
OL	69	Gage Saint	Fr
OL	70	Tyler Burnsed	Fr
OL	71	Hamilton Hawthorne II	Fr
OL	72	Toryque Bateman	Jr
OL	75	Kannon Biggs	Fr
OL	77	Derrick Graham	Fr
OL	78	Jordan Chapman	Jr
OL	79	Austin Stidham	Jr
WR	80	Ollie Finch Jr.	Fr
WR	81	Kyran Griffin-Isom	So
WR	82	Bryce Kelly	Fr
TE	84	AJ Lewis	So
TE	85	Deyunkrea Lewis	Fr
WR	86	Rondell Cole	So
WR	87	Jaden Warren	Fr
WR	88	Demontrez Brown	So
TE	89	Clayton Ollendieck	Fr

Defense

Pos.	#	Name	Class
DE	0	Jamarcus Chatman	So
CB	1	Elijah Culp	Fr
LB	2	Carlton Martial	Jr
DE	3	Antonio Showers	Jr
S	4	Craig Slocum	Jr
DT	5	Will Choloh	Jr
CB	6	Taiyon Palmer	So
LB	7	KJ Robertson	Jr
S	8	TJ Harris	Jr
DE	9	Richard Jibunor	So
LB	10	Jayden McDonald	So
CB	11	O'Shai Fletcher	So
S	12	Markeis Colvin	So
CB	13	Zion Williams	Jr
CB	14	Caleb Ransaw	Fr
LB	15	Jordan Anthony	Jr
S	17	Carloss Crawford	So
CB	18	Reddy Steward	So
S	19	Darrell Starling	Fr
LB	20	Brooks Weeks	Fr
DT	21	Shakel Brown	Jr
S	22	Kyle Nixon	Sr
S	23	Keyshawn Swanson	Fr
CB	24	Josh Brown	Fr
LB	25	Wes Baumhower	So
CB	26	Tavarious Carswell	Fr
S	28	Sterling Roberts	Fr
DE	30	John Hines Jr.	Sr
S	31	Dell Pettus	So
DB	32	Phillip Lee	Fr
LB	33	Tim Steward	Jr
DB	34	Terrence Head	So
LB	35	Navy Harris	Jr
LB	36	Terry Thomas	Fr
CB	37	Christian Murphy	Fr
CB	38	Tye Pouncey	Fr
LB	41	Javon Solomon	Fr
LB	44	Jordan Stringer	Fr
DE	47	Devon Reaves	Fr
DB	48	Cam Williams	Fr
DE	50	Quincey Miller	Fr
DT	52	Buddha Jones	So
LB	59	Max Copeland	Fr
DT	90	Elgin Griffin	Sr
DT	92	Julian Peterson	Fr
DT	93	Chyrius Duckett	Jr
DT	95	Luis Medina	Fr
DT	96	Malik Pertee	Fr
DT	97	AJ Pierce	So
DT	98	T. J. Jackson	Fr
DT	99	Cherokee Glasgow	Sr

Special teams

Pos.	#	Name	Class
P, K	6	Kyle Coale	Sr
K, P	30	Anthony Frederique	Fr
LS	39	Brennen Milliron	So
K	40	Scott Taylor Renfroe	Fr
P	44	Luke Magliozzi	Jr
LS	74	Cameron Kaye	Sr

Head coach

- Chip Lindsey (North Alabama)

Coordinators/assistant coaches

- Brandon Hall (Oklahoma)
  Defensive coordinator/S
- Luke Meadows (South Dakota State)
  Offensive coordinator/OL
- Dayne Brown (Union College)
  Special teams coordinator/TE
- John Carr (Louisiana–Monroe)
  Passing game coordinator/inside receivers
- Bam Hardmon (Illinois)
  Defensive run game coordinator/OLB
- Gary Banks (Troy)
  Outside receivers
- Al Pogue (Alabama State)
  Cornerbacks
- Andrew Warwick (Clemson)
  Linebackers
- Cole Weeks (Auburn)
  Running backs
- Davern Williams (Troy)
  Defensive linemen
- Rusty Whitt (Abilene Christian)
  Strength & conditioning coach

Legend

- (C) Team captain
- (S) Suspended
- (I) Ineligible
- Injured
- Redshirt

Roster
Last update: 5 July 2021

== Game summaries ==
=== Southern ===
Southern at Troy

Team	1	2	3	4	Total
Jaguars	0	3	0	0	3
• Trojans	14	20	14	7	55

- Date: September 4, 2021
- Location: Veterans Memorial Stadium
  Troy, AL
- Game start: 6:05 p.m. CDT
- Elapsed time: 3 hours
- Game attendance: 22,399
- Game weather: 93 °F (34 °C) • Weather: Sunny • Wind: N 5 MPH
- Referee: Trennis Livingston
- TV announcers (ESPN3): Will Kollmeyer (play-by-play) and Ben Stanfield (analyst)

Scoring summary
1	09:02	TROY	Taylor Powell 1-yard rush (Brooks Buce kick) (13 plays, 76 yards, 5:58)	TROY 7–0
1	04:52	TROY	Tez Johnson 26-yard pass from Taylor Powell (Brooks Buce kick) (6 plays, 69 yards, 2:03)	TROY 14–0
2	13:49	TROY	Zion Williams 19-yard interception returned (Brooks Buce kick) (3 plays, 2 yards, 0:57)	TROY 21–0
2	07:34	SOU	Martel Fontenot 31-yard field goal (12 plays, 64 yards, 6:15)	TROY 21–3
2	03:08	TROY	Deshon Stoudemire 17-yard pass from Taylor Powell (Brooks Buce kick) (11 plays, 75 yards, 4:26)	TROY 28–3
2	00:44	TROY	Jamontez Woods 1-yard rush (Brooks Buce PAT blocked) (3 plays, 11 yards, 0:49)	TROY 34–3
3	10:59	TROY	Kimani Vidal 37-yard rush (Brooks Buce kick) (4 plays, 58 yards, 1:17)	TROY 41–3
3	02:04	TROY	B. J. Smith 5-yard rush (Brooks Buce kick) (6 plays, 36 yards, 2:51)	TROY 48–3
4	03:02	TROY	Jamontez Woods 1-yard rush (Brooks Buce kick) (15 plays, 86 yards, 10:25)	TROY 55–3

Statistics	Southern	Troy
First downs	11	27
Total yards	189	467
Rushing yards	81	164
Passing yards	108	303
Turnovers	4	2
Time of possession	27:29	32:31

Team	Category	Player	Statistics
Southern	Passing	Ladarius Skelton	7/11, 85 yards, 2 INTs
Southern	Rushing	Devon Benn	11 carries, 50 yards
Southern	Receiving	Tyler Kirkwood	4 receptions, 39 yards
Troy	Passing	Taylor Powell	17/26, 234 yards, 2 TDs, 1 INT
Troy	Rushing	Kimani Vidal	15 carries, 81 yards, 1 TD
Troy	Receiving	Tez Johnson	5 receptions, 92 yards, 1 TD

=== Liberty ===
Liberty at Troy

Team	1	2	3	4	Total
• RV Flames	7	7	0	7	21
Trojans	7	0	0	6	13

- Date: September 11, 2021
- Location: Veterans Memorial Stadium
  Troy, AL
- Game start: 6:05 p.m. CDT
- Elapsed time: 2 hours and 53 minutes
- Game attendance: 24,714
- Game weather: 83 °F (28 °C) • Weather: Sunny • Wind: NW 7 MPH
- Referee: Jeff Maconaghy
- TV announcers (ESPN+): Will Kollmeyer (play–by–play) and Ben Stanfield (analyst)

Scoring summary
1	09:40	TROY	B. J. Smith 5-yard rush (Brooks Buce kick) (13 plays, 75 yards, 5:20)	TROY 7–0
1	04:29	LIB	Demario Douglas 32-yard pass from Malik Willis (Alex Barbir kick) (9 plays, 75 yards, 5:11)	TIE 7–7
2	07:29	LIB	Jerome Jackson 2-yard pass from Malik Willis (Alex Barbir kick) (13 plays, 90 yards, 7:20)	LIB 14–7
4	12:22	LIB	Malik Willis 4-yard rush (Alex Barbir kick) (8 plays, 90 yards, 4:44)	LIB 21–7
4	01:14	TROY	Deyunkrea Lewis 11-yard pas from Taylor Powell (Brooks Buce PAT blocked) (9 plays, 64 yards, 2:41)	LIB 21–13

Statistics	Liberty	Troy
First downs	22	13
Total yards	339	232
Rushing yards	185	21
Passing yards	154	211
Turnovers	0	1
Time of possession	38:59	21:01

Team	Category	Player	Statistics
Liberty	Passing	Malik Willis	13/18, 154 yards, 2 TDs
Liberty	Rushing	Malik Willis	20 carries, 93 yards, 1 TD
Liberty	Receiving	Demario Douglas	3 receptions, 41 yards, 1 TD
Troy	Passing	Taylor Powell	18/25, 211 yards, 1 TD, 1 INT
Troy	Rushing	Kimani Vidal	11 carries, 38 yards
Troy	Receiving	Luke Whittemore	3 receptions, 71 yards

=== At Southern Miss ===
Troy at Southern Mississippi

Team	1	2	3	4	Total
• Trojans	0	0	14	7	21
Golden Eagles	3	0	0	6	9

- Date: September 18, 2021
- Location: M. M. Roberts Stadium
  Hattiesburg, MS
- Game start: 6:05 p.m. CDT
- Elapsed time: 3 hours and 36 minutes
- Game attendance: 24,242
- Game weather: 77 °F (25 °C) • Weather: Cloudy • Wind: E 4 MPH
- Referee: Scott Broadway
- TV announcers (ESPN+): Jason Baker (play–by–play) and Dustin Almond (analyst)

Scoring summary
1	12:06	USM	Briggs Bourgeois 46-yard field goal (7 plays, 46 yards, 2:54)	USM 3–0
3	12:53	TROY	Jabre Barber 17-yard pass from Taylor Powell (Brooks Buce kick) (5 plays, 75 yards, 2:07)	TROY 7–3
3	00:41	TROY	Deyunkrea Lewis 16-yard pass from Taylor Powell (Brooks Buce kick) (12 plays, 80 yards, 3:39)	TROY 14–3
4	05:49	TROY	Kimani Vidal 8-yard rush (Brooks Buce kick) (5 plays, 24 yards, 3:06)	TROY 21–3
4	03:04	USM	Everitt Cunningham 47-yard fumble returned (Briggs Bourgeois PAT blocked) (1 play, -3 yards, 0:12)	TROY 21–9

Statistics	Troy	Southern Miss
First downs	17	15
Total yards	306	156
Rushing yards	51	-1
Passing yards	255	157
Turnovers	2	2
Time of possession	30:52	28:56

Team	Category	Player	Statistics
Troy	Passing	Taylor Powell	27/39, 255 yards, 2 TDs
Troy	Rushing	Kimani Vidal	17 carries, 47 yards, 1 TD
Troy	Receiving	Tez Johnson	10 receptions, 106 yards
Southern Miss	Passing	Ty Keyes	16/27, 157 yards, 2 INTs
Southern Miss	Rushing	Frank Gore Jr.	15 carries, 31 yards
Southern Miss	Receiving	Antoine Robinson	3 receptions, 49 yards

=== At Louisiana–Monroe ===
Troy at Louisiana–Monroe

Team	1	2	3	4	Total
Trojans	0	3	7	6	16
• Warhawks	7	3	10	9	29

- Date: September 25, 2021
- Location: Malone Stadium
  Monroe, LA
- Game start: 7:05 p.m. CDT
- Elapsed time: 3 hours and 17 minutes
- Game attendance: 12,766
- Game weather: 78 °F (26 °C) • Weather: Sunny • Wind: NE 0 MPH
- Referee: Jeremy Parker
- TV announcers (ESPN+): Mike Hammett (play–by–play) and Josh Peterson (analyst)

Scoring summary
1	08:03	ULM	Zach Jackson 23-yard pass from Rhett Rodriguez (Calum Sutherland kick) (8 plays, 80 yards, 3:55)	ULM 7–0
2	10:14	ULM	Calum Sutherland 26-yard field goal (9 plays, 43 yards, 4:41)	ULM 10–0
2	01:31	TROY	Brooks Buce 32-yard field goal (4 plays, 7 yards, 2:13)	ULM 10–3
3	11:56	ULM	Andrew Henry 40-yard rush (Calum Sutherland kick) (8 plays, 75 yards, 3:04)	ULM 17–3
3	08:57	TROY	Luke Whittemore 49-yard pass from Taylor Powell (Brooks Buce kick) (7 plays, 77 yards, 2:56)	ULM 17–10
3	05:19	ULM	Calum Sutherland 32-yard field goal (8 plays, 60 yards, 3:38)	ULM 20–10
4	13:52	ULM	Team Safety (2 plays, -4 yards, 0:44)	ULM 22–10
4	09:40	ULM	Ja'Cquez Williams 96-yard interception returned (Calum Sutherland kick) (6 plays, 55 yards, 2:01)	ULM 29–10
4	00:36	TROY	Jamontez Woods 4-yard pass from Taylor Powell (two-point pass conversion attempt failed) (11 plays, 80 yards, 2:45)	ULM 29–16

Statistics	Troy	Louisiana–Monroe
First downs	18	15
Total yards	378	290
Rushing yards	67	122
Passing yards	311	168
Turnovers	1	1
Time of possession	31:32	28:28

Team	Category	Player	Statistics
Troy	Passing	Taylor Powell	35/49, 311 yards, 2 TDs, 1 INT
Troy	Rushing	Kimani Vidal	12 carries, 60 yards
Troy	Receiving	Reggie Todd	6 receptions, 83 yards
Louisiana–Monroe	Passing	Rhett Rodriguez	10/16, 131 yards, 1 TD
Louisiana–Monroe	Rushing	Andrew Henry	19 carries, 108 yards, 1 TD
Louisiana–Monroe	Receiving	Zach Jackson	4 receptions, 80 yards, 1 TD

=== At South Carolina ===
Game Five – Troy Trojans (2-2) at South Carolina Gamecocks (2-2)

Quarter	1	2	3	4	Total
Troy	0	7	7	0	14
South Carolina	3	14	3	3	23

at Williams-Brice Stadium • Columbia, South Carolina

- Date: Saturday, October 2, 2021
- Game time: 3:30 p.m. EST
- Game weather: Sunny • Temperature - 84°F
- Game attendance: 60,866
- Referee: Alex Moore
- TV announcers (SEC Network): Taylor Zarzour (play-by-play), Matt Stinchcomb (color analyst), and Alyssa Lang (sideline)
- Box Score

Game information

First quarter

- (8:52) SC – Parker White 23-yard field goal. South Carolina 3-0. Drive: 15 plays, 70 yards, 6:08.

Second quarter

- (14:30) TROY – B.J. Smith 35-yard run (Brooks Buce Kick). Troy 7-3. Drive: 8 plays, 67 yards, 3:36.
- (4:12) SC – E.J. Jenkins 16-yard pass from Luke Doty (Parker White Kick). South Carolina 10-7. Drive: 10 plays, 77 yards, 4:07.
- (0:28) SC – David Spaulding 74-yard interception return (Parker White Kick). South Carolina 17-7.

Third quarter

- (11:25) TROY – Jamontez Woods 1-yard run (Brooks Buce Kick). South Carolina 17-14. Drive: 8 plays, 75 yards, 3:29.
- (4:43) SC – Parker White 48-yard field goal. South Carolina 20-14. Drive: 4 plays, -7 yards, 1:35.

Fourth quarter

- (2:20) SC – Parker White 37-yard field goal. South Carolina 23-14. Drive: 12 plays, 53 yards, 5:57.

Statistics	TROY	SC
First downs	21	19
Plays–yards	69–308	62–356
Rushes–yards	145	101
Passing yards	163	255
Passing: comp–att–int	22–38–2	20–34–0
Time of possession	29:22	30:38

Team	Category	Player	Statistics
TROY	Passing	Taylor Powell	22/38, 163 yards, 2 INT
TROY	Rushing	B. J. Smith	19 carries, 102 yards, TD
TROY	Receiving	Tez Johnson	6 receptions, 49 yards
SC	Passing	Luke Doty	20/34, 255 yards, TD
SC	Rushing	Josh Vann	2 carries, 52 yards
SC	Receiving	Kevin Harris	2 receptions, 49 yards

=== Georgia Southern ===
Georgia Southern at Troy

Team	1	2	3	4	Total
Eagles	0	3	15	6	24
• Trojans	10	7	7	3	27

- Date: October 9, 2021
- Location: Veterans Memorial Stadium
  Troy, AL
- Game start: 6:05 p.m. CDT
- Elapsed time: 3 hours and 23 minutes
- Game attendance: 25,424
- Game weather: 78 °F (26 °C) • Weather: Sunny • Wind: S 4 MPH
- Referee: Trennis Livingston
- TV announcers (ESPN+): Will Kollmeyer (play–by–play) and Ben Stanfield (analyst)

Scoring summary
1	10:43	TROY	Brooks Buce 29-yard field goal (10 plays, 66 yards, 4:17)	TROY 3–0
1	00:37	TROY	Jabre Barber 15-yard pass from Gunnar Watson (Brooks Buce kick) (5 plays, 91 yards, 1:56)	TROY 10–0
2	12:15	GASO	Alex Raynor 27-yard field goal (6 plays, 51 yards, 3:20)	TROY 10–3
2	04:27	TROY	Jamontez Woods 34-yard rush (Brooks Buce kick) (4 plays, 57 yards, 1:38)	TROY 17–3
3	10:55	TROY	Reggie Todd 26-yard pass from Gunnar Watson (Brooks Buce kick) (4 plays, 62 yards, 1:39)	TROY 24–3
3	07:57	GASO	Logan Wright 1-yard rush (Justin Tomlin two-point conversion rush) (6 plays, 75 yards, 2:58)	TROY 24–11
3	06:45	GASO	Khaleb Hood 23-yard rush (Alex Raynor kick) (3 plays, 35 yards, 1:01)	TROY 24–18
4	12:53	GASO	Alex Raynor 42-yard field goal (6 plays, 31 yards, 1:54)	TROY 24–21
4	06:08	GASO	Alex Raynor 38-yard field goal (9 plays, 41 yards, 5:52)	TIE 24–24
4	01:46	TROY	Brooks Buce 24-yard field goal (6 plays, 40 yards, 2:23)	TROY 24–27

Statistics	Georgia Southern	Troy
First downs	17	18
Total yards	301	409
Rushing yards	82	139
Passing yards	219	270
Turnovers	3	1
Time of possession	33:19	26:41

Team	Category	Player	Statistics
Georgia Southern	Passing	Justin Tomlin	15/22, 210 yards, 3 INTs
Georgia Southern	Rushing	Gerald Green	5 carries, 33 yards
Georgia Southern	Receiving	Derwin Burgess Jr.	2 receptions, 76 yards
Troy	Passing	Gunnar Watson	24/36, 270 yards, 2 TDs
Troy	Rushing	Jamontez Woods	9 carries, 98 yards, 1 TD
Troy	Receiving	Reggie Todd	4 receptions, 71 yards, 1 TD

=== At Texas State ===
Troy at Texas State

Team	1	2	3	4	Total
• Trojans	10	7	7	7	31
Bobcats	7	7	14	0	28

- Date: October 16, 2021
- Location: Bobcat Stadium
  San Marcos, TX
- Game start: 2:05 p.m. CDT
- Elapsed time: 3 hours and 3 minutes
- Game attendance: 15,083
- Game weather: 72 °F (22 °C) • Weather: Sunny • Wind: NE 13 MPH
- Referee: Wayne Winkler
- TV announcers (ESPN+): Brant Freeman (play–by–play) and Keith Moreland (analyst)

Scoring summary
1	09:47	TROY	Brooks Buce 34-yard field goal (8 plays, 54 yards, 1:58)	TROY 3–0
1	05:42	TROY	Kimani Vidal 45-yard rush (Brooks Buce kick) (2 plays, 66 yards, 0:28)	TROY 10–0
1	00:18	TXST	Brock Sturges 2-yard rush (Seth Keller kick) (5 plays, 39 yards, 1:25)	TROY 10–7
2	12:58	TROY	Tez Johnson 33-yard pass from Gunnar Watson (Brooks Buce kick) (7 plays, 75 yards, 2:20)	TROY 17–7
2	12:18	TXST	Javen Banks 75-yard pass from Brady McBride (Seth Keller kick) (2 plays, 75 yards, 0:40)	TROY 17–14
3	06:19	TROY	Kimani Vidal 1-yard rush (Brooks Buce kick) (4 plays, 36 yards, 1:06)	TROY 24–14
3	03:32	TXST	Ashtyn Hawkins 2-yard pass from Brady McBride (Seth Keller kick) (7 plays, 70 yards, 2:42)	TROY 24–21
3	01:09	TXST	Trevis Graham Jr. 21-yard pass from Brady McBride (Seth Keller kick) (7 plays, 54 yards, 2:22)	TXST 28–24
4	08:18	TROY	Keyshawn Swanson 33-yard interception returned (Brooks Buce kick) (5 plays, 19 yards, 1:37)	TROY 31–28

Statistics	Troy	Texas State
First downs	23	21
Total yards	387	370
Rushing yards	205	91
Passing yards	182	279
Turnovers	0	4
Time of possession	31:09	28:51

Team	Category	Player	Statistics
Troy	Passing	Gunnar Watson	22/29, 182 yards, 1 TD
Troy	Rushing	Kimani Vidal	25 carries, 162 yards, 2 TDs
Troy	Receiving	Tez Johnson	9 receptions, 81 yards, 1 TD
Texas State	Passing	Brady McBride	22/32, 279 yards, 3 TDs, 3 INTs
Texas State	Rushing	Brock Sturges	11 carries, 49 yards, 1 TD
Texas State	Receiving	Javen Banks	4 receptions, 96 yards, 1 TD

=== Coastal Carolina ===
Troy at Coastal Carolina

Team	1	2	3	4	Total
Trojans	7	7	7	7	28
• No. 24 Chanticleers	7	14	7	7	35

- Date: October 28, 2021
- Location: Brooks Stadium
  Conway, SC
- Game start: 6:35 p.m. CDT
- Elapsed time: 3 hours and 35 minutes
- Game attendance: 11,689
- Game weather: Sunny
- Referee: Wayne Winkler
- TV announcers (ESPN2): Clay Matvick (play–by–play), Rocky Boiman (analyst), and Tiffany Blackmon (sideline reporter)

Scoring summary
1	13:48	CCU	C. J. Marable 59-yard rush (Massimo Biscardi kick) (3 plays, 75 yards, 1:12)	CCU 7–0
1	08:22	CCU	C. J. Marable 20-yard pass from Grayson McCall (Massimo Biscardi kick) (9 plays, 90 yards, 4:18)	CCU 14–0
1	04:02	TROY	Evan Legassey 42-yard field goal (14 plays, 45 yards, 4:20)	CCU 14–3
2	12:26	TROY	Kimani Vidal 4-yard rush (Evan Legassey kick) (13 plays, 87 yards, 3:51)	CCU 14–10
2	05:27	TROY	Evan Legassey 28-yard field goal (14 plays, 79 yards, 5:28)	CCU 14–13
2	01:38	CCU	C. J. Marable 2-yard rush (Massimo Biscardi kick) (8 plays, 75 yards, 3:49)	CCU 21–13
2	00:00	TROY	Evan Legassey 23-yard field goal (8 plays, 66 yards, 1:38)	CCU 21–16
3	04:33	CCU	Jaivon Heiligh 6-yard pass from Grayson McCall (Massimo Biscardi kick) (16 plays, 83 yards, 9:48)	CCU 28–16
3	03:18	TROY	Reggie Todd 41-yard pass from Gunnar Watson (Evan Legassey kick) (4 plays, 69 yards, 1:15)	CCU 28–23
4	05:03	CCU	Grayson McCall 2-yard rush (Massimo Biscardi kick) (4 plays, 4 yards, 2:18)	CCU 35–23
4	02:48	TROY	Jamontez Woods 3-yard rush (Evan Legassey kick) (11 plays, 75 yards, 2:15)	CCU 35–30
4	01:20	TROY	Tray Eafford 6-yard pass from Jacob Free (Jacob Free two-point conversion pass to Khalil McClain) (7 plays, 40 yards, 1:11)	TROY 38–35
4	00:35	CCU	Jaivon Heiligh 23-yard pass from Grayson McCall (Massimo Biscardi kick) (5 plays, 75 yards, 0:45)	CCU 42–38

Statistics	Troy	Coastal Carolina
First downs	29	29
Total yards	514	443
Rushing yards	176	89
Passing yards	338	354
Turnovers	1	3
Time of possession	36:28	23:32

Team	Category	Player	Statistics
Coastal Carolina	Passing	Grayson McCall	24/29, 338 yards, 3 TDs, 1 INT
Coastal Carolina	Rushing	C. J. Marable	20 carries, 120 yards, 2 TDs
Coastal Carolina	Receiving	Jaivon Heiligh	11 receptions, 138 yards, 2 TDs
Troy	Passing	Gunnar Watson	25/37, 260 yards, 1 TD, 1 INT
Troy	Rushing	Jamontez Woods	9 carries, 49 yards, 1 TD
Troy	Receiving	Kaylon Geiger	9 receptions, 103 yards

=== South Alabama ===
South Alabama at Troy

Team	1	2	3	4	Total
Jaguars	7	7	7	3	24
• Trojans	10	21	0	0	31

- Date: November 6, 2021
- Location: Veterans Memorial Stadium
  Troy, AL
- Game start: 2:35 p.m. CDT
- Elapsed time: 3 hours and 15 minutes
- Game attendance: 26,211
- Game weather: 62 °F (17 °C) • Weather: Sunny • Wind: NE 13 MPH
- Referee: Trennis Livingston
- TV announcers (ESPN+): Will Kollmeyer (play–by–play) and Ben Stanfield (analyst)

Scoring summary
1	10:24	USA	Desmond Trotter 4-yard rush (Diego Guajardo kick) (10 plays, 88 yards, 4:13)	USA 7–0
1	07:15	TROY	Brooks Buce 22-yard field goal (6 plays, 17 yards, 1:55)	USA 7–3
1	00:56	TROY	Jamontez Woods 3-yard rush (Brooks Buce kick) (11 plays, 85 yards, 4:14)	TROY 10–7
2	10:10	TROY	Tez Johnson 31-yard rush (Brooks Buce kick) (5 plays, 76 yards, 1:39)	TROY 17–7
2	05:36	TROY	Jamontez Woods 3-yard rush (Brooks Buce kick) (6 plays, 53 yards, 2:05)	TROY 24–7
2	04:55	TROY	KJ Robertson 32-yard interception returned (Brooks Buce kick) (2 plays, 3 yards, 0:41)	TROY 31–7
2	00:09	USA	Terrion Avery 11-yard pass from Desmond Trotter (Diego Guajardo kick) (9 plays, 47 yards, 1:32)	TROY 31–14
3	01:22	USA	Terrion Avery 3-yard pass from Desmond Trotter (Diego Guajardo kick) (19 plays, 76 yards, 9:52)	TROY 31–21
4	06:45	USA	Diego Guajardo 34-yard field goal (13 plays, 49 yards, 6:08)	TROY 31–24

Statistics	South Alabama	Troy
First downs	22	17
Total yards	335	308
Rushing yards	148	107
Passing yards	187	201
Turnovers	2	1
Time of possession	36:25	23:35

Team	Category	Player	Statistics
South Alabama	Passing	Desmond Trotter	20/32, 138 yards, 2 TDs, 1 INT
South Alabama	Rushing	Terrion Avery	23 carries, 75 yards
South Alabama	Receiving	Jalen Tolbert	4 receptions, 65 yards
Troy	Passing	Gunnar Watson	11/14, 121 yards
Troy	Rushing	B. J. Smith	12 carries, 49 yards
Troy	Receiving	Luke Whittemore	3 receptions, 59 yards

=== Louisiana ===
Louisiana at Troy

Team	1	2	3	4	Total
• Ragin' Cajuns	14	0	14	7	35
Trojans	10	3	0	8	21

- Date: November 13, 2021
- Location: Veterans Memorial Stadium
  Troy, AL
- Game start: 2:35 p.m. CST
- Elapsed time: 3 hours and 34 minutes
- Game attendance: 24,738
- Game weather: 59 °F (15 °C) • Weather: Sunny • Wind: SE 11 MPH
- Referee: Kyle Olson
- TV announcers (ESPN+): Will Kollmeyer (play–by–play) and Ben Stanfield (analyst)

Scoring summary
1	12:25	TROY	Gunnar Watson 10-yard rush (Brooks Buce kick) (8 plays, 75 yards, 2:35)	TROY 7–0
1	07:52	LA	Dontae Fleming 15-yard pass from Levi Lewis (Nate Snyder kick) (9 plays, 79 yards, 4:33)	TIE 7–7
1	02:12	TROY	Brooks Buce 30-yard field goal (14 plays, 62 yards, 5:40)	TROY 10–7
1	01:00	LA	Michael Jefferson 52-yard pass from Levi Lewis (Nate Snyder kick) (3 plays, 67 yards, 1:12)	LA 14–10
2	04:20	TROY	Brooks Buce 47-yard field goal (11 plays, 52 yards, 5:09)	LA 14–13
3	11:31	LA	Kyren Lacy 13-yard pass from Levi Lewis (Nate Snyder kick) (6 plays, 63 yards, 3:29)	LA 21–13
3	06:03	LA	Levi Lewis 27-yard rush (Nate Snyder kick) (10 plays, 52 yards, 4:05)	LA 28–13
4	14:13	TROY	Tez Johnson 7-yard pass from Gunnar Watson (Gunnar Watson two-point conversion pass to Deshon Stoudemire) (15 plays, 82 yards, 3:52)	LA 28–21
4	05:15	LA	Montrell Johnson 6-yard rush (Nate Snyder kick) (8 plays, 51 yards, 4:37)	LA 35–21

Statistics	Louisiana	Troy
First downs	19	22
Total yards	370	391
Rushing yards	204	41
Passing yards	166	350
Turnovers	0	3
Time of possession	31:56	28:04

Team	Category	Player	Statistics
Louisiana	Passing	Levi Lewis	14/22, 166 yards, 3 TDs
Louisiana	Rushing	Chris Smith	15 carries, 102 yards
Louisiana	Receiving	Michael Jefferson	2 receptions, 71 yards, 1 TD
Troy	Passing	Gunnar Watson	29/55, 350 yards, 1 TD, 1 INT
Troy	Rushing	Kimani Vidal	11 carries, 21 yards
Troy	Receiving	Tez Johnson	6 receptions, 83 yards, 1 TD

=== Appalachian State ===
Appalachian State at Troy

Team	1	2	3	4	Total
• Mountaineers	3	7	21	14	45
Trojans	7	0	0	0	7

- Date: November 20, 2021
- Location: Kidd Brewer Stadium
  Boone, NC
- Game start: 2:35 p.m. CST
- Elapsed time: 3 hours
- Game attendance: 18,523
- Game weather: 67 °F (19 °C) • Weather: Sunny • Wind: W 10 MPH
- Referee: Marshall Lewis
- TV announcers (ESPN+): Will Kollmeyer (play–by–play) and Ben Stanfield (analyst)

Scoring summary
1	07:36	APP	Chandler Staton 24-yard field goal (12 plays, 81 yards, 5:52)	APP 3–0
1	06:15	TROY	Deshon Stoudemire 37-yard pass from Gunnar Watson (Brooks Buce kick) (4 plays, 75 yards, 1:21)	TROY 7–3
2	00:21	APP	Corey Sutton 21-yard pass from Chase Brice (Chandler Staton kick) (6 plays, 61 yards, 1:00)	APP 10–3
3	12:14	APP	Thomas Hennigan 6-yard pass from Chase Brice (Chandler Staton kick) (6 plays, 64 yards, 2:46)	APP 17–7
3	12:00	APP	Eli Wilson 10-yard pass from Chase Brice (Chandler Staton kick) (1 play, 10 yards, 0:08)	APP 24–7
3	05:08	APP	Nate Noel 5-yard rush (Chandler Staton kick) (8 plays, 45 yards, 3:57)	APP 31–7
4	14:13	APP	Daetrich Harrington 2-yard rush (Chandler Staton kick) (9 plays, 58 yards, 4:53)	APP 38–7
4	05:06	APP	Jahmir Smith 1-yard rush (Chandler Staton kick) (11 plays, 32 yards, 7:46)	APP 45–7

Statistics	Appalachian State	Troy
First downs	26	6
Total yards	445	142
Rushing yards	233	33
Passing yards	212	109
Turnovers	2	2
Time of possession	43:17	16:43

Team	Category	Player	Statistics
Appalachian State	Passing	Chase Brice	17/24, 212 yards, 3 TDs, 2 INTs
Appalachian State	Rushing	Nate Noel	15 carries, 102 yards, 1 TD
Appalachian State	Receiving	Thomas Hennigan	7 receptions, 85 yards, 1 TD
Troy	Passing	Gunnar Watson	11/21, 109 yards, 1 TD, 1 INT
Troy	Rushing	Kimani Vidal	10 carries, 40 yards
Troy	Receiving	Tez Johnson	4 receptions, 44 yards

=== At Georgia State ===
Troy at Georgia State

Team	1	2	3	4	Total
Trojans	0	3	0	7	10
• Panthers	7	10	13	7	37

- Date: November 27, 2021
- Location: Center Parc Stadium
  Atlanta, GA
- Game start: 1:04 p.m. CST
- Elapsed time: 3 hours and 1 minute
- Game attendance: 13,875
- Game weather: 58 °F (14 °C) • Weather: Sunny • Wind: W 6 MPH
- Referee: Trennis Livingston
- TV announcers (ESPN+): Matt Stewart (play–by–play) and Sam Crenshaw (analyst)

Scoring summary
1	07:52	GSU	Aubry Payne 13-yard pass from Darren Grainger (Noel Ruiz kick) (6 plays, 60 yards, 2:11)	GSU 7–0
2	11:18	GSU	Sam Pinckney 36-yard pass from Darren Grainger (Noel Ruiz kick) (10 plays, 74 yards, 3:56)	GSU 14–0
2	02:46	GSU	Noel Ruiz 43-yard field goal (9 plays, 39 yards, 2:37)	GSU 17–0
2	00:34	TROY	Brooks Buce 48-yard field goal (8 plays, 44 yards, 2:12)	GSU 17–3
3	11:30	GSU	Noel Ruiz 45-yard field goal (10 plays, 49 yards, 3:30)	GSU 20–3
3	07:40	GSU	Jamil Muhammad 72-yard fumble returned (Noel Ruiz kick) (9 plays, 47 yards, 3:50)	GSU 27–3
3	01:30	GSU	Noel Ruiz 50-yard field goal (9 plays, 39 yards, 3:07)	GSU 30–3
4	13:15	GSU	Jamyest Williams 50-yard rush (Noel Ruiz kick) (3 plays, 57 yards, 1:25)	GSU 37–3
4	07:06	TROY	B. J. Smith 2-yard rush (Brooks Buce kick) (11 plays, 75 yards, 6:09)	GSU 37–10

Statistics	Troy	Georgia State
First downs	18	21
Total yards	344	387
Rushing yards	57	247
Passing yards	287	140
Turnovers	4	2
Time of possession	32:56	27:04

Team	Category	Player	Statistics
Troy	Passing	Gunnar Watson	21/38, 287 yards, 2 INTs
Troy	Rushing	B. J. Smith	13 carries, 35 yards, 1 TD
Troy	Receiving	Deshon Stoudemire	4 receptions, 80 yards
Georgia State	Passing	Darren Grainger	11/22, 140 yards, 2 TDs
Georgia State	Rushing	Jaymest Williams	15 carries, 108 yards, 1 TD
Georgia State	Receiving	Sam Pinckney	3 receptions, 51 yards, 1 TD
