= William Winston House =

Historic house in Alabama, United States

- U.S. National Register of Historic Places
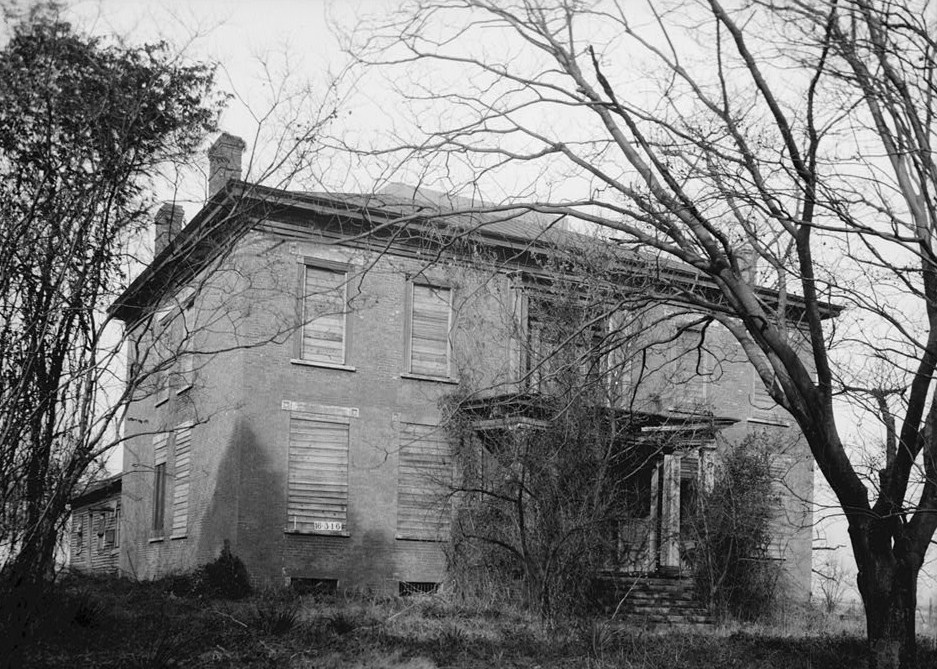
- The house in a 1934 HABS photo

- Location within Alabama Location within the United States
- Location: N. Commons St., Tuscumbia, Alabama
- Coordinates: 34°44′18″N 87°42′4″W
- Area: less than one acre
- Built: 1840
- NRHP reference No.: 82002005
- Added to NRHP: April 15, 1982

The William Winston House is a historic residence in Tuscumbia, Alabama, United States. Construction was begun in the early 1800s by merchant Clark T. Barton and finished in 1824 by planter William Winston. Winston's son, John A. Winston, was Governor of Alabama from 1854 until 1857; Winston's daughter married another Governor, Robert B. Lindsay. The house remained in the family until 1948, when it was sold to the city, which constructed a new campus for Deshler High School around the house.

The two-story brick house has a hipped roof with two chimneys on each side. The brick on all sides is laid in Flemish bond. The five-bay façade features a single-height portico flanked by two non-original nine-over-nine windows on each floor. The portico is supported by four Tuscan columns, and covers a front door that is surrounded by a transom and sidelights. The deck above has a short balustrade, and the original French door has been replaced with a window with sidelights. The interior is laid out in a center-hall plan with two rooms on either side. A spiral staircase runs from the first floor all the way to the attic.

The house was listed on the National Register of Historic Places in 1982.
