= Brandon Hall (American football) =

American football coach (born 1976)

Current position
- Title: Safeties coach
- Team: Oklahoma
- Conference: SEC
- Annual salary: $500,000

Biographical details
- Born: January 15, 1976 (age 50)
- Education: University of Oklahoma

Coaching career (HC unless noted)
- 1998–2000: Oklahoma (SA)
- 2001–2003: Oklahoma (GA)
- 2004–2005: Oklahoma (DQC)
- 2006: Northern Iowa (LB)
- 2007: Broken Arrow HS (OK) (DC/LB)
- 2008: Central Oklahoma (LB)
- 2009–2010: Central Oklahoma (co-DC/LB)
- 2011: Oklahoma (DQC)
- 2012: Arkansas State (S)
- 2013: Auburn (DQC)
- 2014–2017: Jacksonville State (DC/S)
- 2018: Troy (STC/OLB)
- 2019–2021: Troy (DC/S)
- 2021: Troy (Interim HC/DC/S)
- 2022–present: Oklahoma (S)

Head coaching record
- Overall: 0–1

Brandon Hall (born January 15, 1976) is an American football coach who is currently the safeties coach at the University of Oklahoma. He was previously the coordinator at Broken Arrow High School in Oklahoma, Central Oklahoma, Jacksonville State, and Troy.

== Coaching career ==
=== Oklahoma ===
Hall began his coaching career as an undergraduate student assistant coach for the Oklahoma Sooners football team for the 1998 season. He was a member of the Oklahoma staff until 2005 in different roles. Hall was a student assistant from 1998 to 2000 under Brent Venables and then-head coach Bob Stoops, a graduate assistant in the 2001–2002 season, and a defensive quality control coach from 2003 to 2005. During the 2000 football season, Hall and the Sooners won the 2001 Orange Bowl, thus claiming the 2000 NCAA National Championship.

=== Northern Iowa ===
In 2006, Hall was the linebackers coach at Northern Iowa.

=== Broken Arrow High School ===
Hall was the defensive coordinator and coached the linebackers at Broken Arrow High School in Broken Arrow, Oklahoma for the 2007 season.

=== Central Oklahoma ===
Hall spent the 2008 through 2010 seasons as the co-defensive coordinator, linebackers coach, and recruiting coordinator at NCAA Division II Central Oklahoma.

=== Oklahoma (second stint) ===
In 2011, Hall returned to Oklahoma for a season as a defensive assistant.

=== Arkansas State ===
In 2012, Hall joined Gus Malzahn's staff at Arkansas State as the safeties coach. He helped lead the Red Wolves to their second consecutive Sun Belt Conference championship.

=== Auburn ===
Hall followed Malzahn to Auburn as a defensive assistant. That year, the Tigers advanced to the BCS National Championship Game.

=== Jacksonville State ===
Hall was the co-defensive coordinator and safeties coach at Jacksonville State from 2014 to 2017. During his tenure, he helped the Gamecocks to a perfect 31–0 record in Ohio Valley Conference (OVC) play, and a 43–8 record overall. Jacksonville State's defenses were ranked top 20 nationally in all four of Hall's seasons.

=== Troy ===
Hall joined the Troy Trojans football staff for the 2018 season as the special teams coordinator and outside linebackers coach. His special teams ranked fourth nationally in net punting, and ninth nationally in kick return. For the 2019 season, new head coach Chip Lindsey promoted Hall to defensive coordinator, and he subsequently took on coaching the safeties. In 2021 he was the team's interim head coach for a game.

=== Oklahoma (third stint) ===
He was named the team's Assistant Coach / Safeties coach, announced by Head Coach Brent Venables on December 17, 2021.

== Personal life ==
Hall was raised in Newcastle, Oklahoma. He earned an associate degree from Oklahoma City Community College and bachelor's and master's degrees from the University of Oklahoma. He is married to the former Crystal Latham. Together they have three children, daughters; Maddie and Charlee, and son; Will.

== Head coaching record ==
Year	Team	Overall	Conference	Standing	Bowl/playoffs
Troy Trojans (Sun Belt Conference) (2021)
2021	Troy	0–1	0–1	4th (East) (Note: Hall took over as interim head coach with one game remaining)	
Troy:		0–1	0–1		
Total:		0–1			
