= James Deshler =

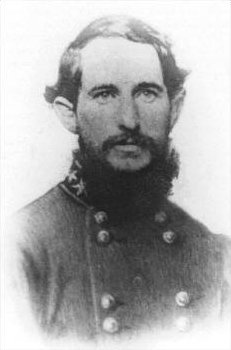
- James Deshler in Confederate uniform
- Born: February 18, 1833; Tuscumbia, Alabama
- Died: September 20, 1863 (aged 30); Chickamauga, Georgia
- Burial place: Oakwood Cemetery, Tuscumbia
- Military career
- Allegiance: United States of America; Confederate States of America
- Branch: United States Army; Confederate States Army
- Service years: 1854–1861 (USA); 1861–1863 (CSA)
- Rank: First Lieutenant (USA); Colonel (CSA); Brigadier General (CSA), unconfirmed.
- Conflicts: Utah War; American Civil War: Battle of Cheat Mountain; Battle of Camp Allegheny; Battle of Arkansas Post; Battle of Chickamauga †

James Deshler (February 18, 1833 – September 20, 1863) was a career United States Army officer and a graduate of West Point who later joined the Confederate States Army. During the American Civil War he fought at Cheat Mountain, Camp Allegheny, Arkansas Post, and Chickamauga. He was appointed a Confederate brigadier general but died on the field of battle with his promotion remaining unconfirmed.

== Early life and career ==
James Deshler was born on February 18, 1833, in Tuscumbia, Alabama, to David Deshler (1798–1872) and Eleanor Taylor (1808–1854). Deshler went to West Point and graduated in 1854. He graduated ranking above James Ewell Brown Stuart, William Dorsey Pender and Stephen Dill Lee. After graduating, James was commissioned as a second lieutenant in the United States Army. His first military experience was an assignment to California after graduation. He was then transferred and promoted to first lieutenant United States Army in 1858 and joined a regiment to fight in the Utah War expedition. After the expedition Deshler was assigned to Fort Wise, where he remained until 1861. In 1861 Deshler resigned his post and joined the Confederate States Army.

== American Civil War ==
After his resignation from the army, Deshler enlisted as a captain in the artillery. In September 1861 he was an assistant to Brigadier General Henry R. Jackson during the Battle of Cheat Mountain. Deshler was wounded at the Battle of Allegheny Mountain when he was shot through the thighs. After his recovery from his wounds he was promoted to colonel and assigned to the staff of Maj. Gen. Theophilus H. Holmes. In 1862 he was given his first command, which consisted of the 10th Texas Infantry Regiment, and the dismounted 15th Texas, 17th Texas, and 18th Texas Cavalry Regiments. On January 11, 1863, Deshler was captured when the Confederates surrendered at the Battle of Arkansas Post. After being exchanged he was promoted to brigadier general on July 28, 1863.

=== Death ===
On the second day of the Battle of Chickamauga on September 20, 1863, while inspecting his brigade before an attack, Deshler was killed instantly by a Union artillery shell when it exploded in front of him, tearing his heart from his body. Command of his brigade was taken over by the future Senator Roger Mills, and the Confederacy won the battle. After the fighting ended, a family friend buried Deshler's body on the battlefield. Later the friend brought Deshler's father to the gravesite. They disinterred Deshler and subsequently reburied him in Oakwood Cemetery in his hometown of Tuscumbia, Alabama.

Mills remarked after Deshler's death:

I may pause here and pay a passing tribute to the memory of our fallen chief. He was brave, generous and kind, even to a fault. Ever watchful and careful for the safety of any member of his command, he was ever ready to peril his own...He poured out his own blood upon the spot watered by the best blood of the brigade. Amongst the host of brave hearts that were offered the altar of sacrifice for their country on that beautiful Sabath, there perished not one, noble, braver, or better than his. He lived beloved, and fell lamented and mourned by every officer and man of his command.

== Honors ==
Deshler's father founded the Deshler Female Institute in memory of his son. To further honor General Deshler, Tuscumbia's Deshler High School was named for him.

== See also ==
- List of American Civil War generals (Acting Confederate)
