= Rusty Whitt =

American football player and coach (born 1971)

Russell T. Whitt
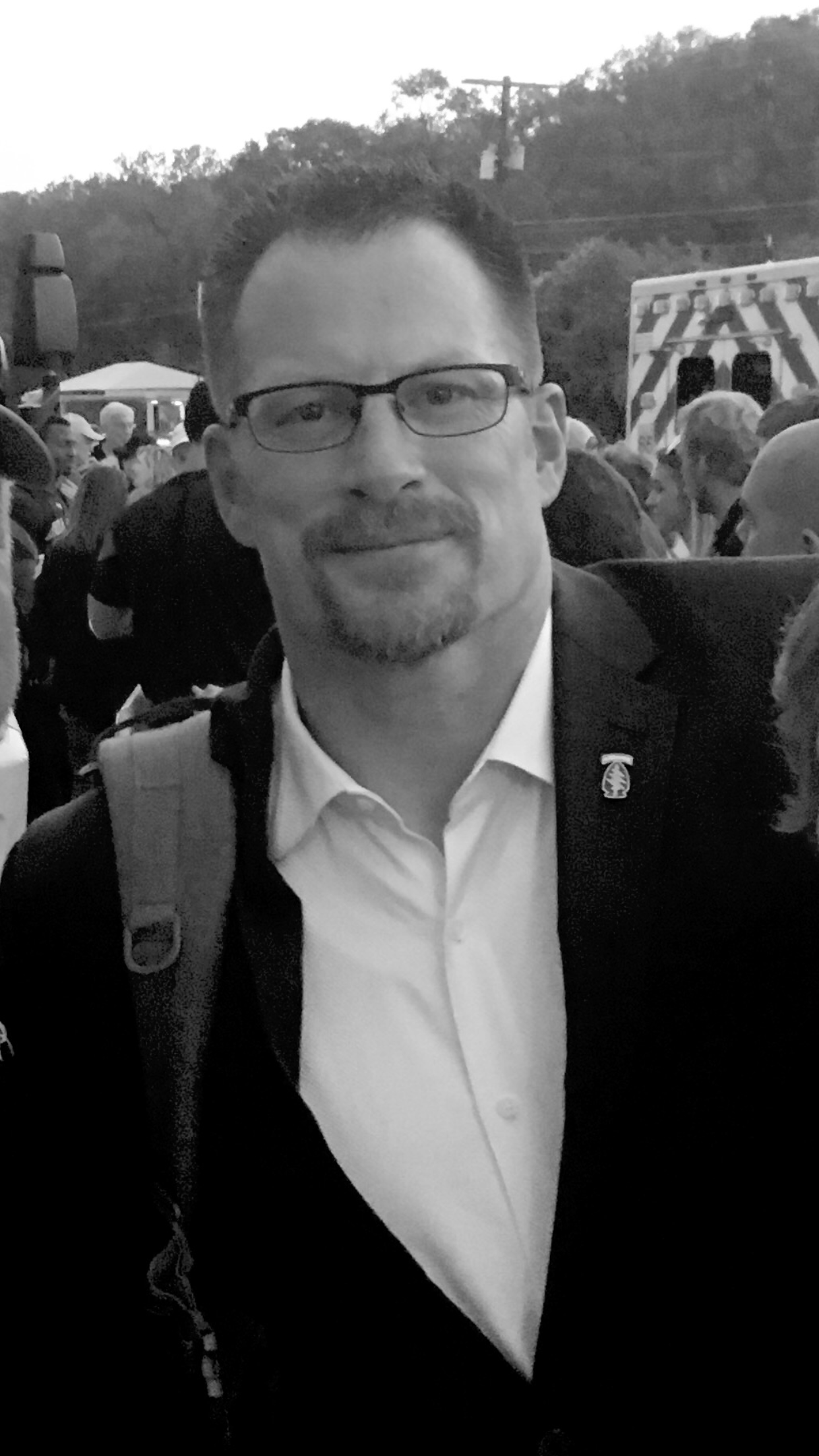
- Coach Whitt following Texas Tech's victory over TCU in 2016

Current position
- Title: Director, Strength and Conditioning Coach
- Team: Florida
- Conference: SEC

Biographical details
- Born: July 6, 1971 (age 55); Azle, Texas, U.S.
- Education: Abilene Christian (BS, Political Science); University of Texas, Austin (MA, Kinesiology)

Playing career
- 1990–1994: Abilene Christian
- Position: Safety

Coaching career (HC unless noted)
- 1995–1996: Midwestern State (GA)
- 1996–1997: Texas (GA)
- 1997: U.S. Olympic Training Center (speed & agility coord.)
- 1997–1998: William & Mary (asst. S&C)
- 1998: Louisville (asst. S&C)
- 1998–2003: Sam Houston State (S&C)
- 2009–2010: Rice (asst. S&C)
- 2010–2015: Louisiana–Lafayette (S&C)
- 2016–2018: Texas Tech (S&C)
- 2019: Army (asst. S&C)
- 2020–2023: Troy (S&C)
- 2024–2025: Tulane (S&C)
- 2026–present: Florida (S&C)

Accomplishments and honors

Awards
- Combat Infantryman's Badge (2007); Iraq Campaign Medal (×2); US Army Commendation Medal with "V" Device

Russell T. Whitt (born July 6, 1971) is the head strength and conditioning coach for the Florida Gators. He previously served as the head S&C coach at Troy from 2020 to 2023 and Tulane from 2024 to 2025. He previously served as an assistant S&C coach with Army in 2019 and as the head S&C coach for Texas Tech from 2016 to 2018 and the Louisiana from 2010 to 2016.

== Playing career ==
Whitt played safety and linebacker for Abilene Christian University in Abilene, Texas, from 1990 to 1994. He graduated in 1994, earning a bachelors of science degree in police science and administration.

== Coaching career ==
=== Midwestern State Mustangs ===
From August 1995–96, Whitt began his career as a graduate assistant football coach and strength and conditioning coach at Midwestern State University, where he developed strength programs for football, men's soccer, volleyball, and men's and women's basketball. He introduced a comprehensive speed, flexibility, and agility development program for football and soccer, and tested his skills as a linebackers, and defensive ends coach.

=== Texas Longhorns ===
Whitt was a graduate assistant in the University of Texas Department of Strength and Conditioning for varsity football, baseball and men's basketball from June 1996 – May 1997, where the Longhorns were inaugural Big XXII Champions (Football 1996), and played in the Fiesta Bowl in 1997.

Whitt earned his Masters of Education in Kinesiology while at Texas in 1997.

=== The US Olympic Training Center ===
Whitt coordinated speed and agility development for the 1997 Team USA men's and women's volleyball, and assisted in program development for all sports, including USA basketball, and wrestling.

=== The College of William and Mary Tribe ===
Whitt was an assistant strength and conditioning coach for The College of William & Mary football team for the 1997 season as well as being designated as the head strength coach for Olympic Sports.

=== University of Louisville Cardinals ===
Whitt was an assistant strength and conditioning coach for the University of Louisville football team for the 1998 season, as well as the speed and agility coordinator for the freshmen football athletes.

=== Sam Houston State Bearkats ===
In the five years Whitt spent with the Sam Houston State Bearkats (1998−2003), he was the head strength and conditioning coach for eleven Division I varsity sports. He also served as an instructor in the school's kinesiology department as well as assisted in the design of a new weight facility.

=== Rice Owls ===
Three months after completing a six-year stint in the Army, Whitt returned to coaching as the assistant coordinator of strength and conditioning at Rice University. While only there for the 2009 season, he developed training and recovery programs for the Owls' football, baseball, swimming, and track & field teams.

=== Louisiana−Lafayette Ragin' Cajuns ===
In October 2010, Coach Whitt was hired as the strength and conditioning coach to oversee 12 NCAA sports at the University of Louisiana, Lafayette. Whitt developed a plan for a $750,000 equipment and infrastructure overhaul for ULL athletics and provided the design for a 12,250 square-foot performance center which was completed in September 2015.

=== Texas Tech Red Raiders ===
In January 2016, Whitt was hired as the new head strength and conditioning coach for the Texas Tech Red Raiders by head football coach Kliff Kingsbury At Tech, Whitt introduced a program called "4th Quarter Combatives," which applied mixed martial arts themed conditioning to football training. Whitt also introduced "velocity based training" using technology to measure bar speed for Olympic lifts. While at Texas Tech, Whitt oversaw three full-time assistants as well as a graduate assistant. He was let go along with the rest of the Texas Tech staff following the 2018 season when new coach Matt Wells took over.

=== Army Black Knights ===
On February 19, 2019, the United States Military Academy Athletic Department announced the hire of Whitt as an assistant football strength and conditioning coach under head football coach Jeff Monken and head football strength and conditioning coach Conor Hughes. He spent one season with the Black Knights before moving on to take another head S&C position.

=== Troy Trojans ===
On February 8, 2020, Troy head football coach Chip Lindsey announced the hire of Whitt as the head football strength and conditioning coach.

=== Tulane Green Wave ===
On December 24, 2023, Whitt rejoined former Troy head football coach Jon Sumrall's lineup at Tulane as the director of strength and conditioning.

== Military career ==
From 2003 to 2009, Whitt was a communication sergeant in the 10th Special Forces Group of the United States Army. He was awarded the combat infantryman's badge (2007), two Iraqi campaign medals, and the Army commendation medal with valor.

Whitt left his job at Sam Houston State to join the Army, but continued his work in strength and conditioning to enhance training, most notably developing and initiating a comprehensive pre-deployment conditioning program for his Special Forces team prior to their two deployments.

In 2016, Whitt was named as a finalist for the Armed Forces Merit Bowl Award.
