= Colbert County Courthouse =

Courthouse in Tuscumbia, Alabama

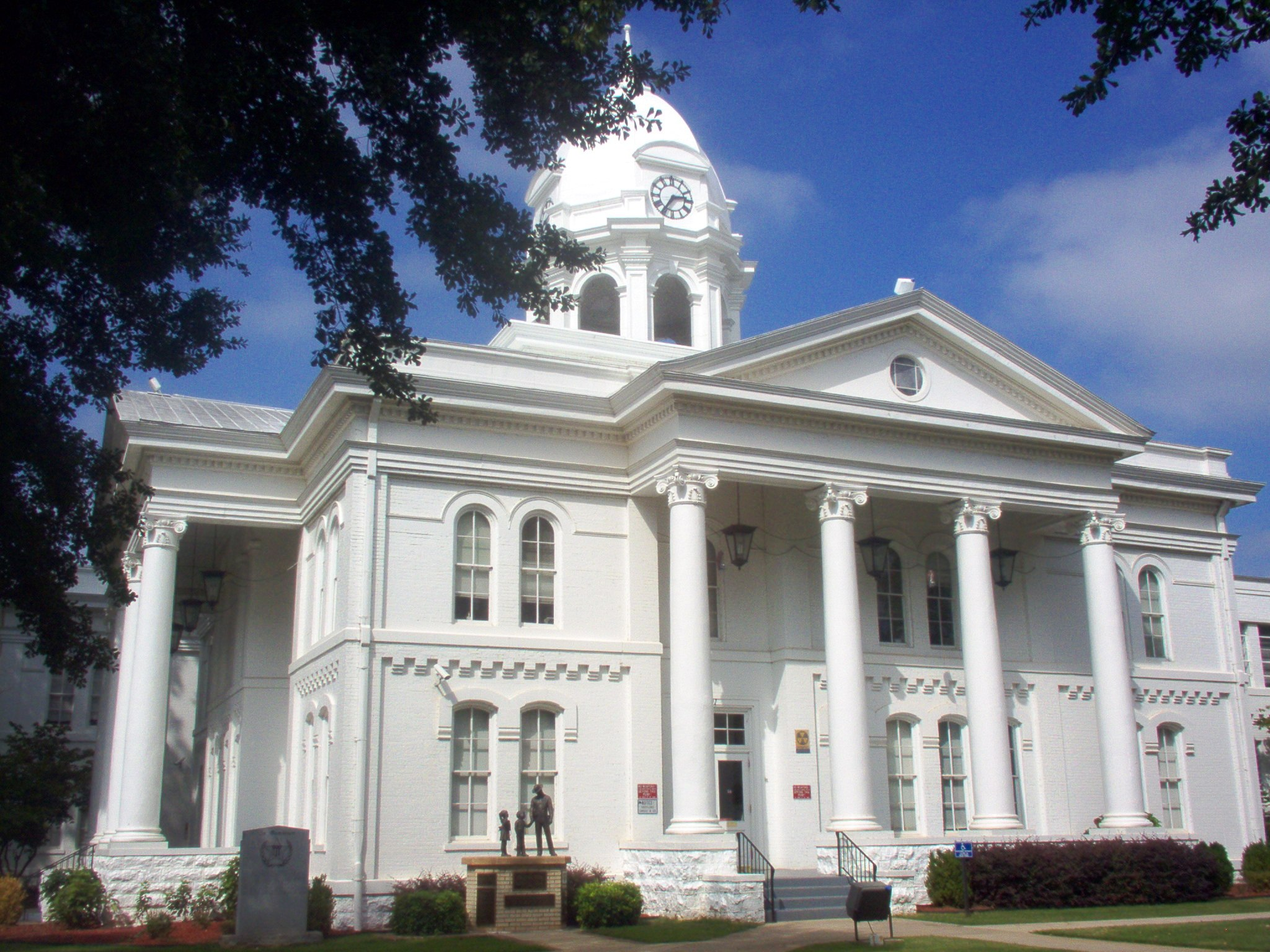
- Interactive map of the Colbert County Courthouse area

General information
- Location: 201 N. Main Street, Tuscumbia, Alabama, U.S
- Coordinates: 34°44′2″N 87°42′15″W
- Year built: 1881, 1908
- Completed: 1881

Website
- www.colbertcounty.org/history.html

The Colbert County Courthouse is a courthouse located within the Colbert County Courthouse Square Historic District in Tuscumbia, Alabama.

== History ==
The courthouse was first built in 1881. It was nearly destroyed in a fire in 1908, but was rebuilt later in 1909. The wings were added in 1948 and 1975. The district for the courthouse was listed on the National Register of Historic Places in 1973.

In January 2025, the courthouse was closed due to a electrical issue. It was later re-opened.
