= Chip Lindsey =

American football player and coach (born 1974)

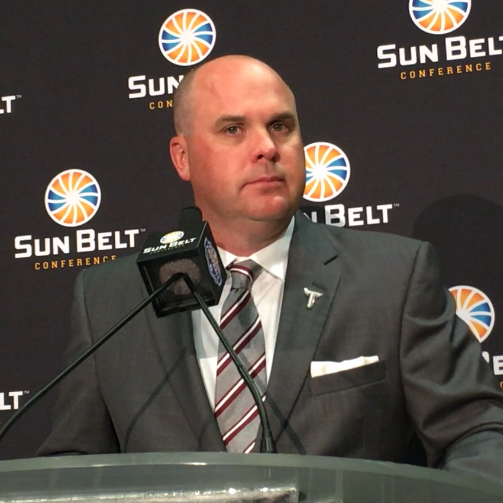

Current position
- Title: Offensive coordinator
- Team: Missouri
- Conference: SEC

Biographical details
- Born: September 9, 1974 (age 52); Madison, Alabama, U.S.
- Education: Alabama (1997)

Playing career
- 1992–1993: North Alabama
- Position: Wide receiver

Coaching career (HC unless noted)
- 1997–1998: Springville HS (AL) (assistant)
- 1999: Sparkman HS (AL) (assistant)
- 2000–2004: Deshler HS (AL) (assistant)
- 2005–2006: Colbert Heights HS (AL)
- 2007: Hoover HS (AL) (OC)
- 2008–2009: Lassiter HS (GA)
- 2010: Troy (QB)
- 2011–2012: Spain Park HS (AL)
- 2013: Auburn (OA)
- 2014–2015: Southern Miss (OC/QB)
- 2016: Arizona State (OC/QB)
- 2017–2018: Auburn (OC/QB)
- 2019–2021: Troy
- 2022: UCF (OC/QB)
- 2023–2024: North Carolina (OC/QB)
- 2025: Michigan (OC/QB)
- 2026–present: Missouri (OC)

Head coaching record
- Overall: 15–19 (college); 51–23 (high school)

Accomplishments and honors

Awards
- Atlanta Coach of the Year (2009); Cobb County TD Club Coach of the Year (2009); AP Georgia Coach of the Year (2008); Florence Times-Daily Coach of the Year (2006)

Chip Lindsey (born September 9, 1974) is an American college football coach and former player. He is the offensive coordinator for the University of Missouri. He served as the head football coach at Troy University from 2019 to 2021. Lindsey was the quarterbacks coach at Troy during the 2010 season. Lindsey has also served as the offensive coordinator at the University of Southern Mississippi (2014–2015), Arizona State University (2016), Auburn University (2017–2018), the University of Central Florida (2022), the University of North Carolina (2023–2024), and the University of Michigan (2025).

== Early life and education ==
Lindsey played three sports and graduated from Bob Jones High School in Madison, Alabama in 1992 and played football at University of North Alabama under then-head coach Bobby Wallace, before transferring to the University of Alabama located in Tuscaloosa, Alabama, and earned his bachelor's degree in history and English in 1997.

== Coaching career ==
=== High school coaching ===
Lindsey began coaching as an assistant in 1997 at Springville High School located in Springville, Alabama. After two seasons he moved to Sparkman High School in Harvest, Alabama. In 2000, he moved to Deshler High School in Tuscumbia, Alabama and served as an assistant under AHSAA Hall of Fame coach John Mothershed, until 2004 where he had two undefeated regular seasons. The following year in 2005, Lindsey became the head coach at Colbert Heights High School Tuscumbia, Alabama for two seasons with a combined record of 14–8. In 2007, he would become the offensive coordinator at Hoover High School under coach Rush Propst. Following one season at Hoover, Lindsey became the head coach at Lassiter High School in Marietta, Georgia until 2009.

In 2011, after one season as Troy University quarterbacks coach, he would return to high school coaching at Spain Park High School in Hoover, Alabama where he would have a combined 15–9 record with two consecutive state playoff appearances, while Nick Mullens appeared as the 6A state player of the year.

=== Troy ===
Lindsey became quarterbacks coach under Larry Blakeney for the 2010 season where he coached Sun Belt Freshman of the Year Corey Robinson, who threw for 3,707 yards with 28 touchdowns and 15 interceptions while leading the No. 37 passing offense in the country.

=== Southern Miss ===
Under coach Todd Monken, Lindsey was named the offensive coordinator at The University of Southern Mississippi in 2014. In 2015, the Golden Eagles finished the season 9–5, including 7–1 in C-USA play, as the champions of the West Division. The 2015 team also finished 12th in the nation in total offense. They represented the West Division in the Conference USA Football Championship Game where they lost to Western Kentucky University. They were invited to the Heart of Dallas Bowl, where they were defeated by Washington.

=== Arizona State ===
In December 2015, it was announced that Lindsey would be named the new offensive coordinator at Arizona State University for the 2016 season. Arizona State would finish the 2016 season at 5–7, while averaging over 33 points per game and 11th in the nation in red zone offense.

=== Auburn ===
Lindsey was an offensive analyst on Auburn's staff in 2013, the season the Tigers won the SEC title and fell 13 seconds short of a national championship. On January 21, 2017, Auburn head coach Gus Malzahn announced that Lindsey would serve as the new offensive coordinator, producing $800,000 in compensation. During the 2017 season, the Tigers won an SEC West Division Championship after wins over top-ranked Georgia and Alabama. For the 2018 season, Auburn finished 8–5. He left Auburn after 2018 to be the offensive coordinator at Kansas.

=== Troy ===
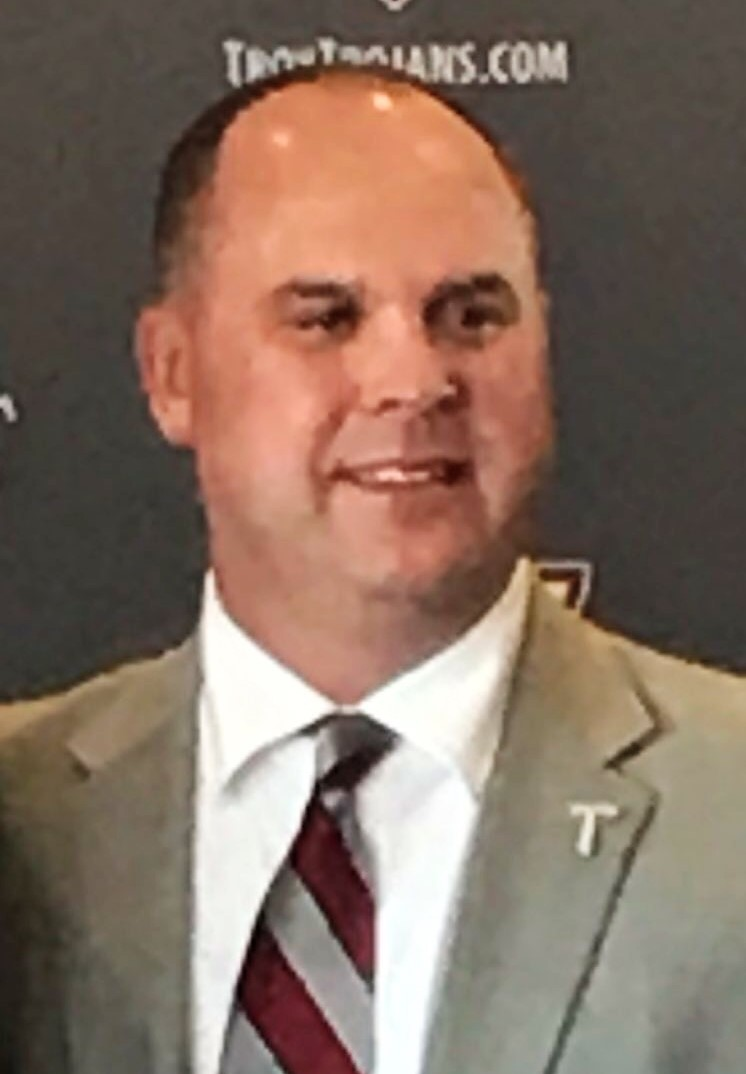
Lindsey at his Troy introductory press conference

On January 11, 2019, Lindsey was named the new head football coach at Troy University. Troy fired Lindsey on November 21, 2021, with one game remaining in the 2021 season. Lindsey posted a record of 15–19 over three years with no bowl appearances.

=== UCF ===
After being let go by Troy, Lindsey reunited with Gus Malzahn at UCF. He was hired as UCF's offensive coordinator and quarterbacks coach. However, he did not call plays at UCF. He spent one season in Orlando, where they competed for the AAC Championship and the Knights' offense finished 26th nationally in scoring, 11th in yards per game, and 8th in rushing.

=== North Carolina ===
Following Phil Longo's departure for Wisconsin, Lindsey was hired by Mack Brown as the Tar Heels' new offensive coordinator and quarterbacks coach on December 15, 2022. In his first season, North Carolina won eight games and he helped coach Drake Maye into being selected No. 3 overall in the 2024 NFL draft.

=== Michigan ===
On December 13, 2024, Lindsey was officially hired by Sherrone Moore and the University of Michigan as the offensive coordinator and quarterbacks coach. In his first season, he inherited the No. 1 overall ranked high school player in the nation, freshman quarterback Bryce Underwood.

=== Missouri ===
On December 21, 2025, Lindsey was named offensive coordinator at Missouri.

== Head coaching record ==
=== College ===
| Year | Team | Overall | Conference | Standing | Bowl/playoffs |
|---|---|---|---|---|---|
Troy Trojans (Sun Belt Conference) (2019–2021)
| 2019 | Troy | 5–7 | 3–5 | 4th (East) | |
| 2020 | Troy | 5–6 | 3–4 | 5th (East) | |
| 2021 | Troy | 5–6 | 3–4 | (East) (Note: Troy fired Lindsey with one game remaining) | |
| Troy: | | 15–19 | 9–13 | | |
| Total: | | 15–19 | | | |

=== High school ===
| Year | Team | Overall | Conference | Standing | Bowl/playoffs |
|---|---|---|---|---|---|
Colbert Heights Wildcats () (2005–2006)
| 2005 | Colbert Heights | 5–5 | 3–4 | 6th | |
| 2006 | Colbert Heights | 9–3 | 5–2 | 2nd | |
| Colbert Heights: | | 14–8 | 8–6 | | |
Lassiter Trojans () (2008–2009)
| 2008 | Lassiter | 9–3 | 7–2 | 4th | |
| 2009 | Lassiter | 12–1 | 9–0 | 1st | |
| Lassiter: | | 21–4 | 16–2 | | |
Spain Park Jaguars () (2011–2012)
| 2011 | Spain Park | 5–6 | 4–3 | 3rd | |
| 2012 | Spain Park | 11–5 | 6–1 | 1st | |
| Spain Park: | | 16–11 | 10–4 | | |
| Total: | | 51–23 | | | |
National championship Conference title Conference division title or championship game berth
