= Deion Belue =

American gridiron football player (born 1991)

No. 13
- Position: Cornerback

Personal information
- Born: September 3, 1991 (age 35); Tuscumbia, Alabama, U.S.
- Listed height: 5 ft 11 in (1.80 m)
- Listed weight: 185 lb (84 kg)

Career information
- High school: Tuscumbia (AL) Deshler
- College: Alabama

Career history

Playing
- 2014: Miami Dolphins*
- 2014: Pittsburgh Steelers*
- 2014: Jacksonville Jaguars*
- 2015–2016: Edmonton Eskimos
- * Offseason or practice squad member only

Coaching
- 2017–2021: Tuscumbia (AL) Deshler
- 2021-present: Sheffield, Alabama

Awards and highlights
- Grey Cup champion (2015); BCS national champion (2013)
- Stats at Pro Football Reference
- Stats at CFL.ca

Deion Belue (born September 3, 1991) is an American former football cornerback. He played college football at Alabama. Belue signed with the Miami Dolphins as an undrafted free agent in 2014. In addition, he spent time as a member of the Pittsburgh Steelers and Jacksonville Jaguars.

== Early life ==
Belue attended Deshler High School in Tuscumbia, Alabama. He was selected to the Alabama Sports Writers Association 4A All-State team twice while in high school. He recorded 70 tackles as a junior in 2008 with four interceptions, two in which returned for touchdowns. He also returned two punts and one kickoff for touchdowns while hauling in over 800 yards receiving and five touchdowns.

Considered a three-star recruit by Rivals.com, he was rated as the 82nd best cornerback prospect in the nation.

College recruiting
Name	Hometown	School	Height	Weight	40^{‡}	Commit date
Deion Belue; CB	Tuscumbia, Alabama	Deshler High School	6 ft 0 in (1.83 m)	175 lb (79 kg)	4.51	Jan 15, 2010
Deion Belue; CB	Recruit ratings: Scout: Rivals:					
Overall recruit ranking: Scout: 23 (CB) Rivals: -- National, 85 (CB), 24 (Ala)
‡ Refers to 40-yard dash; Note: In many cases, Scout, Rivals, 247Sports, On3, and ESPN may conflict in their listings of height, weight and 40 time.; In these cases, the average was taken. ESPN grades are on a 100-point scale.; Sources: "Alabama Football Commitments". Rivals.; "2010 Alabama Football Recruiting Commits". Scout.; "Scout.com Team Recruiting Rankings". Scout.; "2010 Team Ranking". Rivals.com.

== College career ==
Belue spent the previous two seasons at Northeast Mississippi Community College before transferring to Alabama. Belue was selected to the NJCAA's 2011 All-American list during sophomore season. He was selected to the second-team NJCAA All-American team following the 2011 season. In his first season at Alabama, he started all 14 totaling 40 tackles (6.5 for loss), two interceptions and a fumble return 57 yards for a touchdown. Belue broke up seven passes and forced a fumble. As a senior in 2013, he started 11 games recording 20 tackles and one interception, which came against Tennessee.

== Professional career ==
=== Miami Dolphins ===
On May 12, 2014, he signed with the Miami Dolphins as an undrafted free agent. He was waived on May 25, 2014.

=== Pittsburgh Steelers ===
Belue was signed by the Pittsburgh Steelers on May 29, 2014.

=== Jacksonville Jaguars ===
On July 23, 2014, Belue was signed by the Jacksonville Jaguars. On August 25, 2014, Belue was released.

=== Edmonton Eskimos ===
On June 1, 2015, Belue signed with the Edmonton Eskimos of the Canadian Football League. He was on the practice roster of the 2015 team that won the Grey Cup.
