= Tennessee Valley Museum of Art =

Art museum in Tuscumbia, Alabama, U.S.

Coordinates: 34.7377°N 87.7052°W

The Tennessee Valley Museum of Art, formerly known as the Tennessee Valley Art Center, is an art museum located at 511 N Water St in Tuscumbia, Alabama. It is also the headquarters of the Tennessee Valley Art Association.

== History ==
Coordinated planning to establish the Tennessee Valley Museum of Art (TVMA) began in 1963 when the Art Clubs of Tri-Cities began spearheading meetings with other partners to formally discuss the matter. The Tennessee Valley Art Association (TVAA) was organized in 1963 to pursue this goal under the leadership of Dr. L. E. Fraser. While meeting of the TVAA began in 1963, it was not formally incorporated until 1964. In 1970, under the leadership of Mrs. J. A. Knight, the TVAA signed an agreement with Tuscumbia's mayor, William Gardiner, to build an art mussuem on the North Common in Tuscumbia with a 99-year lease and perpetual renewal rights. A campaign to raise funds to build the museum was launched at the same time.

Architect Howard A. Griffith Jr. designed the museum, and the ground breaking for construction of the TVMA began on July 6, 1972. Local artist Ethel Davis is credited as providing an instrumental leadership role in establishing the TVMA. She died on November 1, 1968, before the museum was completed in 1973. An opening ceremony was held in March 1973 with the museum opening as the Tennessee Valley Art Center. It was later renamed the Tennessee Valley Museum of Art in 2009. Artist Dupree Fuller painted a portrait of Davis which was unveiled at the TVMA in 1974. In 2019 the TVMA had a special exhibition dedicated to Davis and her artwork.

The museum's permanent collection includes the Martin Petroglyph which was carved by Native Americans between 600 and 1,000 years ago. It was donated to the museum in 1990.
