= WZZA =

Radio station licensed to serve Tuscumbia, Alabama

Tuscumbia, Alabama; United States
- Broadcast area: Florence - Muscle Shoals, AL
- Frequency: 1410 kHz

Programming
- Format: Urban AC

Ownership
- Owner: Muscle Shoals Broadcasting Co.

History
- First air date: July 4, 1972
- Former call signs: WRCK (1972-74)

Technical information
- Facility ID: 47087
- Class: D
- Power: 500 watts day 51 watts night
- Transmitter coordinates: 34°42′29″N 87°41′35″W

Links
- Webcast: Listen Live
- Website: wzzaradio.com

WZZA (1410 AM) is a radio station licensed to serve Tuscumbia, Alabama. The station is owned by Muscle Shoals Broadcasting. It airs an Urban adult contemporary music format.

The station was assigned the WZZA call letters by the Federal Communications Commission on July 4, 1972. When the station first began broadcasting in 1972, it did so under the call letters WRCK. Robert "Bob" Carl Bailey and his wife Odessa Bailey became sole owners in 1977 and the station has been owned and operated by the Bailey family since that time. Mr. Bailey died on April 16, 2001, at which time his daughter Tori Bailey became the station's general manager.

WZZA Radio, a division of Muscle Shoals Broadcasting, began broadcasting on July 4, 1972. This heritage station was founded, owned, and operated by Robert "Bob" Carl Bailey who, with his wife Odessa, established a voice for the Black Community of Northwest Alabama to answer an unmet need for entertainment, education, and enlightenment for an audience that had long been under-served. WZZA Radio has a hybrid format consisting of sacred and secular music and talk radio.

Known as the "Soul of the Shoals", WZZA Radio not only provides programming, but also serves as a catalyst for action relating to health, education, finance, and politics. The public service provided by WZZA Radio includes public affairs programming that provides voter education and encourages registration, raises awareness about health disparities, teaches economic and financial empowerment, and serves as a community forum for discussion of many issues of particular interest to African Americans.

The station's Tuscumbia facilities were listed on the National Register of Historic Places in 2025.
