= Tuscumbia Female Academy =

Female seminary in Tuscumbia, Alabama

Tuscumbia Female Academy was an American female seminary in Tuscumbia, Alabama. Chartered by the state of Alabama on January 13, 1826, and rechartered in 1832, it was one of the oldest schools for women established in the state. The school operated until the 1860s when it was closed due to the Civil War. After its closing, the buildings were used by the public schools of Tuscumbia.

Mrs. Kate E. R. Pickard taught at the school.
