= Deshler High School (Alabama) =

Coordinates: 34.7390°N 87.7016°W

Location
- 200 E North Commons; Tuscumbia, Alabama 35674; United States

Information
- Former name: Deshler Female Institute
- Type: Public
- Established: 1921 (105 years ago)
- School district: Tuscumbia City Schools
- Superintendent: Russ Tate
- CEEB code: 012695
- Principal: Jessica Byrd
- Officer in charge: Selwyn "OJ" Jones
- Staff: 32.92 (on full-time equivalent (FTE) basis)
- Grades: 9–12
- Enrollment: 488 (2024-2025)
- Student to teacher ratio: 14.82
- Colors: Cardinal and white
- Mascot: RIP the Tiger
- Nickname: Tigers
- Rival: Brooks High School
- Yearbook: The Tiger's Roar
- Website: dhs.tuscumbia.k12.al.us

Deshler High School is a public secondary institution situated in Tuscumbia, Alabama, United States. It serves students in grades 9 through 12 and operates as the only public high school within the Tuscumbia City Schools district. The school offers academic programs and participates in a variety of athletic activities, with noted involvement in girls' basketball and football.

== History ==
Deshler High School in Tuscumbia, Alabama, has a history that traces back to the post-Civil War era. In 1871, Major David Deshler, mourning the loss of his son, Brigadier General James Deshler, who was killed at the Battle of Chickamauga in 1863, donated land and a building to establish the Deshler Female Institute in his son's memory. The institute opened in 1874 but was soon destroyed by a tornado; it was rebuilt in 1875 and operated until financial difficulties led to its closure in 1917.

In 1924, the city of Tuscumbia repurposed the site of the former institute to construct a new high school, naming it Deshler High School. This institution served the community until 1950, when a new campus was established on the grounds of the historic Winston plantation. The William Winston House, built in 1824, remains a prominent feature on the current campus.

== Campus ==
Established in 1950 on the grounds of the former Winston plantation, the campus prominently features the William Winston House. This historic structure, listed on the National Register of Historic Places, serves as a central landmark on the school grounds.

Over the years, the campus has expanded to accommodate the growing needs of its student body. In 1954, additions included a cafeteria, auditorium, and a junior high building. By 1966, a distinctive round gymnasium was constructed, nicknamed "The Dome", complemented by surrounding vocational shops and a hexagonal library. These facilities were opened to students during the 1966–67 school year.

In 2020, Deshler High School further enriched its campus offerings by introducing the Bank Independent Tiger Branch. This student-operated bank office, established through a partnership with Bank Independent, provides practical financial literacy experiences, allowing students to engage in real-world banking operations under faculty supervision.

== Academics ==
As of the 2023–2024 academic year, Deshler High School has an enrollment of 472 students with a student-teacher ratio of approximately 14:1. The school offers a comprehensive curriculum that includes Advanced Placement (AP) courses, career and technical education programs, and various extracurricular activities.

=== "The Chap" ===
Howard Chappell Stadium is the home field for Deshler High School's football and track teams, located at 200 N Commons St E in Tuscumbia, Alabama. Named in honor of Howard Chappell, a prominent figure in the school's athletic history, the stadium serves as a central venue for various sporting events and community gatherings.

The stadium is equipped with modern facilities to accommodate both athletes and spectators. Its versatile design allows it to host a range of events, from high school football games to track meets. The venue's spacious grounds and amenities contribute to its reputation as a key location for athletic competitions in the region. It also hosts the annual Coldwater Classic band competition in early November.

Beyond sports, Howard Chappell Stadium plays a significant role in the community, often serving as a site for local events like peewee football.

=== Girls' basketball ===
One of Deshler High School's most prominent figures is longtime girls' basketball coach Jana Killen. Serving since 1989, Killen has become the winningest basketball coach in Alabama High School Athletic Association (AHSAA) history, achieving over 920 career victories. Under her leadership, the Deshler girls' basketball team has won eight state championships and made multiple Final Four appearances. Beyond basketball, Killen has also coached volleyball, softball, and tennis, contributing to Deshler’s strong overall athletics program. Her achievements have been honored through her induction into both the Alabama High School Sports Hall of Fame and the University of North Alabama Hall of Fame, and in 2021, the gymnasium court at Deshler was named in her honor. She also holds the AHSAA record for all-time most wins with a record of 927-225 as of the end of the 2024-25 season.

Under Coach Killen since 1989, the Deshler Girls' basketball team has secured eight AHSAA state championships in the years 1985, 2003, 2004, 2005, 2006, 2015, 2016, and 2022. The 2021–22 season was particularly noteworthy, with the team achieving a 34–1 record and clinching the state title with a 74–42 victory over St. James.

=== Football ===
The Deshler High School football program, located in Tuscumbia, Alabama, has a long-standing presence in the Alabama High School Athletic Association (AHSAA). Founded in 1917, the team has recorded multiple accomplishments, including state championships in Class 4A in 1990, 1998, and 1999. The 1990 season concluded with a 15–0 record and a 28-27 championship win. Over the years, the program has made 38 appearances in the state playoffs, with a total of 85 playoff victories. Home games are held at Howard Chappell Stadium.

While Paul "Bear" Bryant is renowned for his legendary coaching career at the University of Alabama, he also had a brief stint assisting at Deshler High School in Tuscumbia, Alabama. During this period, Bryant volunteered to help his friend Howard Chappell, who was the head coach of the Deshler Tigers. Bryant specifically worked with the team's defense.

=== Other sports ===
Deshler High School offers a comprehensive athletic program beyond its storied football and girls’ basketball teams, providing students with a wide range of sports opportunities. The school competes in AHSAA Class 4A Region 8. Athletic offerings include boys’ and girls’ basketball, volleyball, baseball, softball, soccer, cross country, track and field, golf, tennis, and wrestling. The volleyball team has a strong tradition, including multiple postseason appearances and state runner-up finishes, while the boys’ basketball and baseball teams consistently compete at the regional level. The tennis program has produced notable individual performances and earned a team state runner-up title in 2015 and 2025.

=== Deshler Marching Tiger Band ===
The Deshler Marching Tiger Band is a prominent component of Deshler High School's arts program. Open to students in grades 7 through 12 who have completed at least one year of beginning band, the ensemble performs at all Deshler football games, community parades, pep rallies, and regional marching competitions. In recent years, the band has achieved notable success, earning Alabama Class 4A State Runner-Up titles in 2021, 2023, 2024, and 2025. The band also hosts the annual Coldwater Classic, a regional marching competition held each November, attracting bands from across the state.

In the 2024 marching season, the Deshler High School Marching Tiger Band delivered a performance at the USBands Southeastern Championships and STATS Grand Championships held on November 9 at Louis Crews Stadium, Alabama A&M University, in Huntsville, Alabama. Competing in Open Class Group IV, the band earned a score of 84.300, securing second place behind Harrison County High School and ahead of Clarksville High School.

=== Notable alumni ===
Deion Belue: A standout cornerback at Deshler, Belue earned All-State honors and went on to play college football at the University of Alabama, where he was part of the 2013 BCS National Championship team. He later played professionally with the Miami Dolphins, Pittsburgh Steelers, Jacksonville Jaguars, and the Edmonton Eskimos, winning a Grey Cup in 2015. Belue returned to Deshler as a coach from 2017 to 2021, and currently coaches at Sheffield High School.
