= Tuscumbia City Schools =

School district in Alabama, United States

Logo of the Tuscumbia City Schools district.

Tuscumbia City School District is a school district in Colbert County, Alabama.

== History ==
In 2023, the Tuscumbia City School district became the first school system in the state of Alabama to receive an electric school bus through the EPA's Clean School Bus program.

In 2025, Superintendent Russ Tate announce a $5 million plan to build new classrooms at G.W Trenholm Primary School and R.E. Thompson Intermediate School to keep up with the city's population growth. The expansion will add four new classrooms at each school, and each new classroom will be able to accommodate 22 students each.

== List of schools ==
- G. W. Trenholm Primary School
- R. E. Thompson Intermediate School
- Deshler Middle School
- Deshler High School
- Deshler Career Technical Center
