= Tuscumbia, Alabama =

City in Alabama, United States

- City
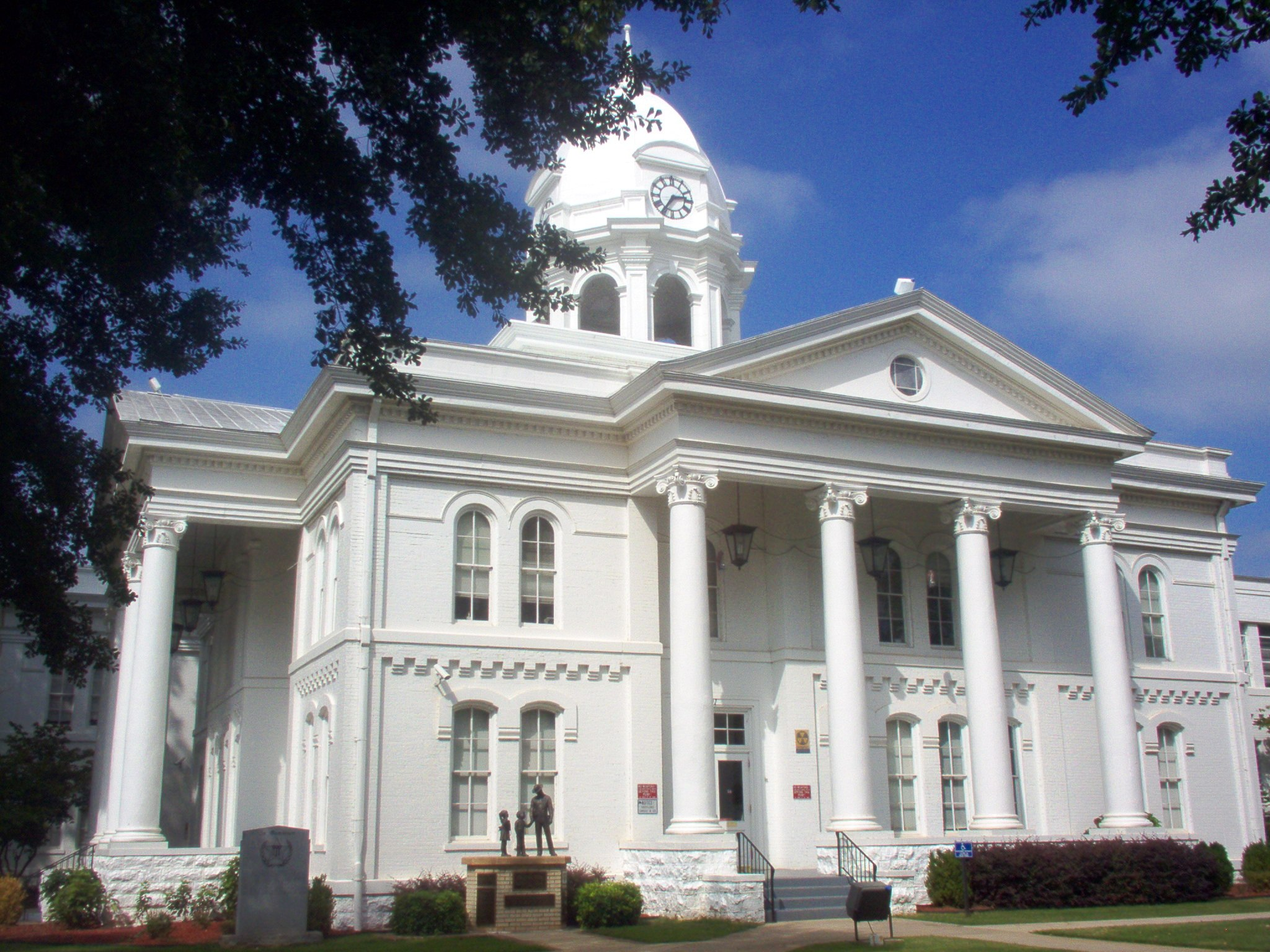
- Colbert County Courthouse in Tuscumbia

- Seal
- Nickname: "The Charm of the Shoals" “The Town”
- Location of Tuscumbia, Alabama
- Coordinates: 34°43′13.26″N 87°42′12.64″W
- Country: United States
- State: Alabama
- County: Colbert
- Founded: 1815
- Incorporated: December 20, 1820
- Named for: Chief Tuscumbia

Government
  - Type: Mayor–Council
  - Mayor: T.W. Billings
  - Councilmembers: Roderick Metcalf; Sidney Nall; Jennifer Bennetch; Robert “Len” Gregory; Krista Stanley

Area
  - City: 9.258 sq mi (23.978 km^{2})
  - Land: 9.215 sq mi (23.867 km^{2})
  - Water: 0.044 sq mi (0.113 km^{2})
- Elevation: 430 ft (130 m)

Population (2020)
  - City: 9,054
  - Estimate (2023): 9,169
  - Density: 995.0/sq mi (384.19/km^{2})
  - Urban: 78,925
  - Metro: 155,175
- Demonym: Tuscumbian
- Time zone: UTC−6 (Central (CST))
  - Summer (DST): UTC−5 (CDT)
- ZIP Code: 35674
- Area codes: 256 and 938
- FIPS code: 01-77280
- GNIS feature ID: 2405616
- Sales tax: 9.0%
- Website: cityoftuscumbia.org

Tuscumbia is a city in and the county seat of Colbert County, Alabama, United States. The population was 9,054 at the 2020 census, and was estimated to be 9,169 in 2023. The city is part of The Shoals metropolitan area.

Tuscumbia was the hometown of Helen Keller, who lived at Ivy Green. Several sites in the city are listed on the National Register of Historic Places, especially in the Tuscumbia Historic District. The city is also the site of the Alabama Music Hall of Fame.

== History ==
=== 19th century ===
When the Michael Dixon family arrived about 1816, they were the first European Americans to settle here. It was traditional territory of the Chickasaw people. The settlers traded with Chief Tuscumbia for the Tuscumbia Valley and built their home at the head of the big spring. Other settlers joined them and there developed a village known as the Big Spring Community. The men of the community requested that the state legislature incorporate them as a city. The town was incorporated in 1820 as Ococoposa, a Chickasaw word meaning 'cold water'. It is one of Alabama's oldest towns. In 1821, its name was changed to Big Spring and on December 22, 1822, to Tuscumbia, after the Chief Rainmaker of the Chickasaw.

Although shoals on the nearby Tennessee River made the river nearly impassable, a federal road completed in 1820 provided the area with good access to markets. Tuscumbia soon became the center for agriculture in northern Alabama. A line to the town on the Tuscumbia, Courtland and Decatur Railroad was completed in 1832, and by 1850 Tuscumbia was a major railroad hub for train traffic throughout the South.

From 1826 to the 1860s, the Tuscumbia Female Academy operated in Tuscumbia. It was one of a number of private schools founded by planters and others wealthy enough to pay for the education of their sons and daughters. A public city school system was not established until 1855.

During the Civil War, the railroad hub made Tuscumbia a target of the Union Army, which destroyed the railroad shops and other parts of the town. The Civil War resulted in the permanent closure of the Tuscumbia Female Academy.

Tuscumbia was designated as the county seat for Colbert County in 1867.

A tornado, estimated at F4 intensity on the Fujita scale, struck Tuscumbia on November 22, 1874, damaging or destroying about a third of the town and killing 14 people.

In April 1894, three African Americans accused of planning to commit arson were taken from the Tuscumbia jail by a mob of 200 men and lynched, hanged from the bridge over the Tennessee River. The turn of the century period was the nadir of race relations in the South, with frequent violence by whites against African Americans to maintain white supremacy.

=== 20th and 21st centuries ===
In March 1973 the Tennessee Valley Museum of Art (then known as the Tennessee Valley Art Center) opened to the public.

The 2019–20 coronavirus pandemic resulted in the temporary closure of two tourist destinations: The Alabama Music Hall of Fame and Ivy Green at the beginning of the month of April 2020 to reduce social contact and help curb the spread of COVID-19.

== Geography ==
Tuscumbia is located northeast of the center of Colbert County. It is bordered to the north by the city of Sheffield and to the northeast by the city of Muscle Shoals. The Tennessee River is 1 mile (1.6 km) to the northwest.

According to the United States Census Bureau, the city has a total area of 9.258 square miles (23.98 km^{2}), of which, 9.215 square miles (23.87 km^{2}) is land and 0.043 square miles (0.11 km^{2}) (0.50%) is water.

=== Climate ===
According to the Köppen climate classification, Tuscumbia has a humid subtropical climate (abbreviated Cfa).

Climate data for Tuscumbia, 1991–2020 simulated normals (479 ft elevation)
Month	Jan	Feb	Mar	Apr	May	Jun	Jul	Aug	Sep	Oct	Nov	Dec	Year
Mean daily maximum °F (°C)	50.7 (10.4)	55.0 (12.8)	63.7 (17.6)	72.9 (22.7)	80.2 (26.8)	87.3 (30.7)	90.0 (32.2)	89.8 (32.1)	84.7 (29.3)	74.7 (23.7)	62.8 (17.1)	53.6 (12.0)	72.1 (22.3)
Daily mean °F (°C)	40.8 (4.9)	44.6 (7.0)	52.2 (11.2)	61.0 (16.1)	69.4 (20.8)	76.6 (24.8)	79.9 (26.6)	79.0 (26.1)	73.2 (22.9)	62.1 (16.7)	50.7 (10.4)	43.5 (6.4)	61.1 (16.2)
Mean daily minimum °F (°C)	31.1 (−0.5)	34.0 (1.1)	40.8 (4.9)	49.1 (9.5)	58.6 (14.8)	66.0 (18.9)	69.8 (21.0)	68.4 (20.2)	61.9 (16.6)	49.6 (9.8)	38.8 (3.8)	33.4 (0.8)	50.1 (10.1)
Average precipitation inches (mm)	5.27 (133.78)	5.28 (134.13)	5.43 (137.96)	5.24 (132.97)	4.97 (126.14)	4.82 (122.53)	4.98 (126.47)	4.24 (107.75)	4.07 (103.26)	3.66 (93.08)	4.14 (105.14)	6.08 (154.32)	58.18 (1,477.53)
Average dew point °F (°C)	32.4 (0.2)	35.1 (1.7)	40.6 (4.8)	49.3 (9.6)	58.8 (14.9)	66.6 (19.2)	70.3 (21.3)	69.1 (20.6)	63.1 (17.3)	52.0 (11.1)	41.4 (5.2)	35.8 (2.1)	51.2 (10.7)
Source: PRISM Climate Group

== Demographics ==
Historical population
Census	Pop.	Note	%±
1870	1,214		—
1880	1,369		12.8%
1890	2,491		82.0%
1900	2,348		−5.7%
1910	3,324		41.6%
1920	3,855		16.0%
1930	4,533		17.6%
1940	5,515		21.7%
1950	6,734		22.1%
1960	8,994		33.6%
1970	8,828		−1.8%
1980	9,137		3.5%
1990	8,413		−7.9%
2000	7,856		−6.6%
2010	8,423		7.2%
2020	9,054		7.5%
2023 (est.)	9,169	▲	1.3%
U.S. Decennial Census; 2020 Census

As of the 2023 American Community Survey, there are 3,972 estimated households in Tuscumbia with an average of 2.22 persons per household. The city has a median household income of $47,342. Approximately 19.0% of the city's population lives at or below the poverty line. Tuscumbia has an estimated 54.8% employment rate, with 22.1% of the population holding a bachelor's degree or higher and 85.2% holding a high school diploma.

The top five reported ancestries (people were allowed to report up to two ancestries, thus the figures will generally add to more than 100%) were English (99.5%), Spanish (0.2%), Indo-European (0.3%), Asian and Pacific Islander (0.0%), and Other (0.0%).

In the 2023 ACS, the median age in the city was 38.7 years.

=== Racial and ethnic composition ===
Tuscumbia, Alabama – racial and ethnic composition Note: the US Census treats Hispanic/Latino as an ethnic category. This table excludes Latinos from the racial categories and assigns them to a separate category. Hispanics/Latinos may be of any race.
Race / ethnicity (NH = non-Hispanic)	Pop. 2000	Pop. 2010	Pop. 2020	% 2000	% 2010	% 2020
White alone (NH)	5,919	6,350	6,375	75.34%	75.39%	70.41%
Black or African American alone (NH)	1,763	1,752	1,991	22.44%	20.80%	21.99%
Native American or Alaska Native alone (NH)	21	33	28	0.27%	0.39%	0.31%
Asian alone (NH)	11	28	16	0.14%	0.33%	0.18%
Pacific Islander alone (NH)	0	0	0	0.00%	0.00%	0.00%
Other race alone (NH)	8	6	24	0.10%	0.07%	0.27%
Mixed race or multiracial (NH)	58	138	392	0.74%	1.64%	4.33%
Hispanic or Latino (any race)	76	116	228	0.97%	1.38%	2.52%
Total	7,856	8,423	9,054	100.00%	100.00%	100.00%

=== 2020 census ===
As of the 2020 census, there were 9,054 people, 4,079 households, and 2,402 families residing in the city. The population density was 982.4 inhabitants per square mile (379.3/km^{2}). There were 4,560 housing units at an average density of 494.8 per square mile (191.0/km^{2}).

In the city, 20.7% of residents were under the age of 18, 5.5% were under the age of 5, and 21.8% were 65 years of age or older. The median age was 42.5 years. The gender makeup of the city was 43.8% male and 56.2% female. For every 100 females there were 86.0 males, and for every 100 females age 18 and over there were 82.2 males age 18 and over.

Of residents, 92.2% lived in urban areas, while 7.8% lived in rural areas.

Of the 4,079 households, 26.5% had children under the age of 18 living in them. Of all households, 37.0% were married-couple households, 20.0% had a male householder with no spouse or partner present, and 38.4% had a female householder with no spouse or partner present. About 37.1% of all households were made up of individuals, and 16.7% had someone living alone who was 65 years of age or older. Of the 4,560 housing units, 10.5% were vacant; the homeowner vacancy rate was 1.9% and the rental vacancy rate was 8.3%.

=== 2010 census ===
As of the 2010 census, there were 8,423 people, 3,704 households, and 2,279 families residing in the city. The population density was 963.1 inhabitants per square mile (371.9/km^{2}). There were 4,120 housing units at an average density of 470.9 per square mile (181.8/km^{2}). The racial makeup of the city was 75.91% White, 21.17% African American, 0.39% Native American, 0.33% Asian, 0.00% Pacific Islander, 0.49% from some other races and 1.71% from two or more races. Hispanic or Latino people of any race were 1.38% of the population.

There were 3,704 households, out of which 25.4% had children under the age of 18 living with them, 46.2% were married couples living together, 14.0% had a female householder with no husband present, and 36.6% were non-families. 34.5% of all households were made up of individuals, and 17.5% had someone living alone who was 65 years of age or older. The average household size was 2.19 and the average family size was 2.81.

In the city, the population was spread out, with 21.64% under the age of 18, 6.20% from 18 to 24, 30.15% from 25 to 44, 19.50% from 45 to 64, and 21.9% who were 65 years of age or older. The median age was 42 years. For every 100 females, there were 83.6 males. For every 100 females age 18 and over, there were 78.6 males.

The median income for a household in the city was $28,793, and the median income for a family was $39,831. Males had a median income of $32,159 versus $18,860 for females. The per capita income for the city was $18,302. About 11.1% of families and 15.1% of the population were below the poverty line, including 21.7% of those under age 18 and 19.92% of those age 65 or over.

== Education ==
Tuscumbia City Schools and the Colbert County Board of Education provide public education for Tuscumbia. The following public schools are located in Tuscumbia:

- Deshler Area Vocational Center (grades 9 through 12)
- Deshler High School (grades 9 through 12)
- Colbert Heights High School (grades 7 through 12)
- Deshler Middle School (grades 6 through 8)
- Colbert Heights Elementary School (grades K through 6)
- New Bethel Elementary (grades K through 6)
- R. E. Thompson Intermediate School (grades 3 through 5)
- G. W. Trenholm Primary School (grades K through 2)

Private schools in Tuscumbia include Covenant Christian School (grades K through 12).

== Economy ==
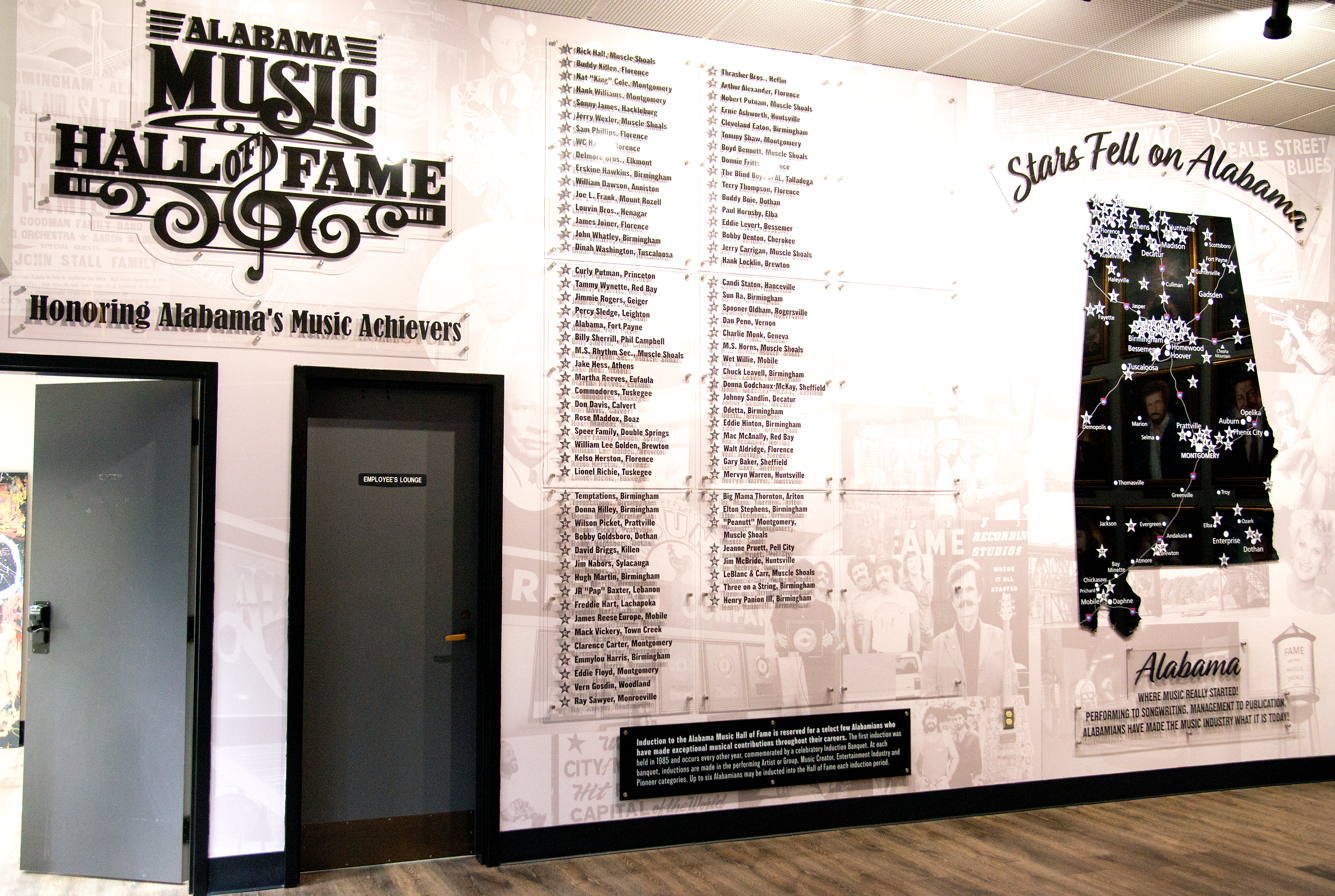
Alabama Music Hall of Fame

As of 2023, the primary industries were Health Care & Social Assistance and Accommodation & Food Services (tourism). Manufacturing employed the greatest number of people. Other employment categories included Waste Management Services and Scientific, & Technical Services.

Tourist attractions include Helen Keller's childhood home, Ivy Green, Tennessee Valley Art Center, Alabama Music Hall of Fame, Tuscumbia Depot, Belle Mont Mansion, Coldwater Stagecoach Stop, Coon Dog Cemetery, Seven Springs Lodge/Rattlesnake Saloon, Hawk Pride Mountain Off-Road Park, and Colbert County Courthouse.

== Media ==
Radio stations:

- WVNA 1590 AM (News/Talk)
- WZZA 1410 AM (Urban contemporary)

== Transportation ==
=== Major highways ===
- US 43
- US 72

=== Transit ===
There is no fixed-route transit service in Tuscumbia. However, the Northwest Alabama Council of Local Governments operates a dial-a-ride transit service known as NACOLG Transit.

== 1902 shooting ==
On April 6, 1902, Will Reynolds embarked on a subsequent shootout with a posse that was originally sent to arrest him at his home in Tuscumbia. Armed with a Winchester repeating rifle, Reynolds fatally shot seven members of the posse and wounded two others. The standoff ended when the posse set fire to his home, resulting in Reynolds’ death. It was the deadliest mass shooting by a lone shooter in Alabama's history until the Geneva County massacre over a century later. It remains the deadliest mass shooting by a lone gunman in Colbert County, as well as the deadliest gunfight for law enforcement in Alabama's history.

== Notable people ==
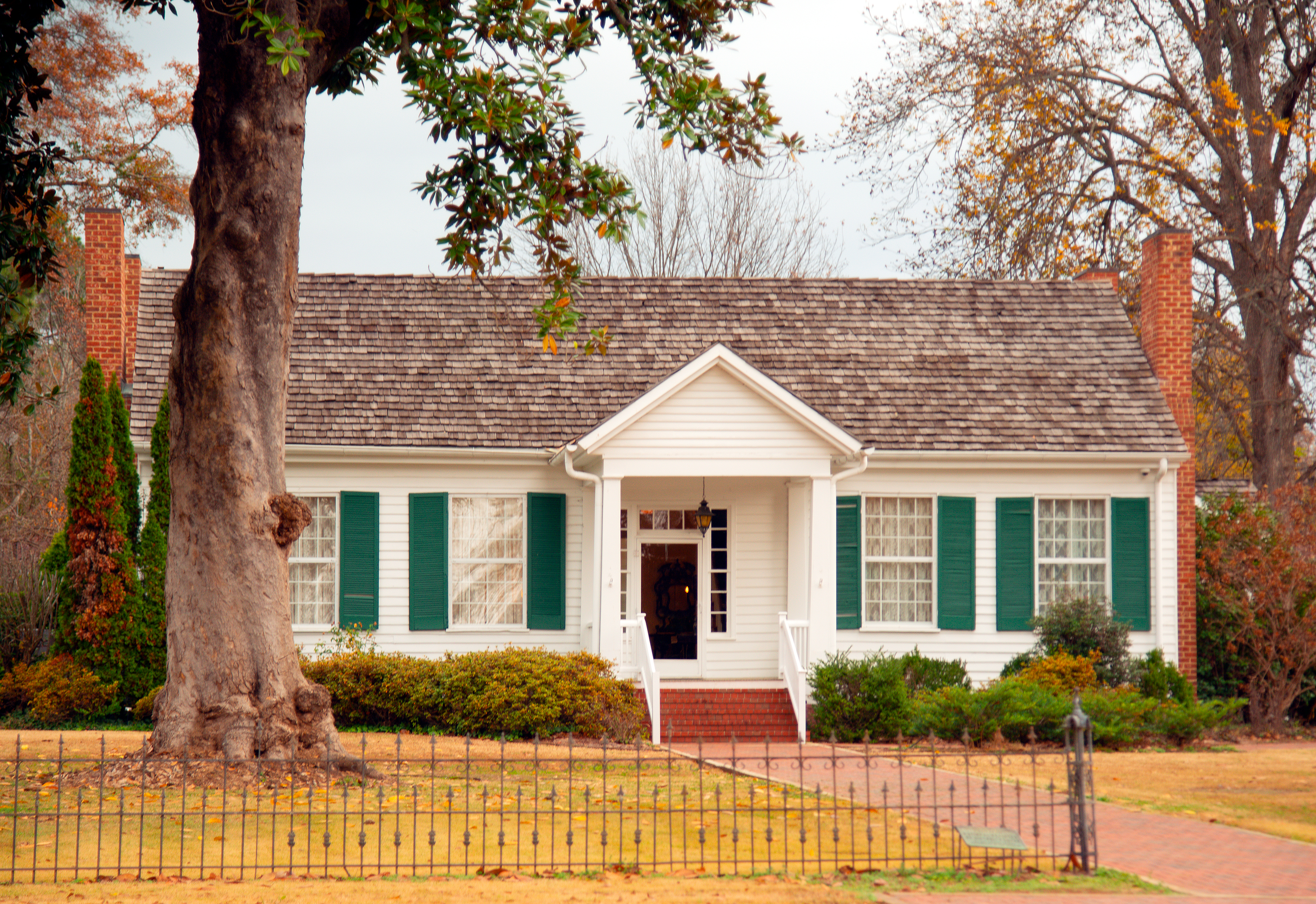
Helen Keller's childhood home, Ivy Green

- Cynthia Bailey, model, actress, entrepreneur, and cast member of The Real Housewives of Atlanta
- Beverly Barton, novelist
- Deion Belue, American football cornerback
- Archibald Hill Carmichael, politician and U.S. Representative from 1933 to 1937
- Mike Cooley, guitarist for the alt-country/rock band Drive-By Truckers
- James Deshler, Confederate brigadier general during the American Civil War
- Al Gamble, session musician
- Howell Thomas Heflin, U.S. senator from Alabama (1979–97), Alabama Supreme Court Chief Justice (1971–77)
- Richard H. Jackson, former four-star admiral in the United States Navy
- Helen Keller, deafblind author, activist, lecturer, and socialist
- Robert B. Lindsay, 22nd Governor of Alabama
- Frank Manush, former Major League Baseball third baseman for the Philadelphia Athletics
- Heinie Manush, professional baseball player, elected to the Baseball Hall of Fame
- Jimmy Orr, former National Football League wide receiver
- Margaret Pellegrini, played one of the Munchkins in the movie The Wizard of Oz
- Billy Pettinger, songwriter, painter and author
- Will Reynolds, gunfighter, mass murderer and one of the first American mass shooters
- William Henry Sawtelle, United States federal judge from 1931 to 1934
- William H. Steele, member of the U.S. District Court for the Southern District of Alabama
- Larry Stutts, State Senator whose patient's death inspired "Rose's Law"
- Bubba Underwood, mayor of Tuscumbia and member of the Alabama House of Representatives
- Wilson D. Watson, United States Marine Corps private who received the Medal of Honor for his actions on Iwo Jima
