= National Register of Historic Places listings in Colbert County, Alabama =

Location of Colbert County in Alabama

This is a list of the National Register of Historic Places listings in Colbert County, Alabama.

This is intended to be a complete list of the properties and districts on the National Register of Historic Places in Colbert County, Alabama, United States. Latitude and longitude coordinates are provided for many National Register properties and districts; these locations may be seen together in an online map.

There are 32 properties and districts listed on the National Register in the county, including three National Historic Landmarks.

This National Park Service list is complete through NPS recent listings posted June 26, 2026.

== Current listings ==
| | Name on the Register | Image | Date listed | Location | City or town | Description |
|---|---|---|---|---|---|---|
| 1 | Barton Hall | Barton Hall | November 7, 1973 (#73000337) | 2.5 miles (4 km) west of Cherokee on U.S. Route 72; 34°45′09″N 88°00′12″W | Cherokee vicinity | |
| 2 | Belle Mont | Belle Mont | February 23, 1982 (#82002003) | Southeast of Tuscumbia; 34°39′42″N 87°40′01″W | Tuscumbia vicinity | |
| 3 | Buzzard Roost | Buzzard Roost | November 7, 1976 (#76000157) | 3 miles west of Cherokee on U.S. Route 72; 34°45′37″N 88°01′24″W | Cherokee vicinity | |
| 4 | Clyde Carter House | Clyde Carter House | June 2, 2004 (#04000559) | 300 Lime Kiln Rd. 34°47′25″N 87°31′41″W | Ford City | |
| 5 | Chambers-Robinson House | Chambers-Robinson House | May 14, 1993 (#93000419) | 910 Montgomery Ave. 34°46′04″N 87°41′53″W | Sheffield | |
| 6 | John and Archibald Christian House | John and Archibald Christian House | February 4, 1982 (#82002004) | Off U.S. Route 72; 34°43′05″N 87°42′14″W | Tuscumbia | |
| 7 | Colbert County Courthouse Square Historic District | Colbert County Courthouse Square Historic District | May 24, 1973 (#73000338) | Roughly bounded by E. and W. 2nd, N. and S. Cave, E. and W. 6th, and N. and S. Indian Sts. 34°44′02″N 87°42′15″W | Tuscumbia | |
| 8 | Easterwood House | Easterwood House | January 31, 2019 (#100003107) | 200 Easterwood St. 34°45′19″N 87°57′52″W | Cherokee | |
| 9 | Florence, Alabama Music Enterprises (FAME) Recording Studios | Florence, Alabama Music Enterprises (FAME) Recording Studios | November 29, 2016 (#16000397) | 603 Avalon Ave. 34°44′42″N 87°40′00″W | Muscle Shoals | |
| 10 | Ivy Green | Ivy Green | August 25, 1970 (#70000101) | 300 W. North Common; 34°44′21″N 87°42′23″W | Tuscumbia | |
| 11 | Johnson's Woods | Johnson's Woods | May 4, 1988 (#88000511) | 801 E. North Commons; 34°44′26″N 87°41′35″W | Tuscumbia | |
| 12 | John Johnson House | | July 9, 1986 (#86001537) | Near the junction of Fosters Mill and River Rds. 34°46′04″N 87°27′15″W | Leighton vicinity | |
| 13 | La Grange Rock Shelter | | June 13, 1974 (#74000406) | Address Restricted | Leighton vicinity | |
| 14 | Memphis & Charleston Railroad Bridge | Memphis & Charleston Railroad Bridge | May 30, 2024 (#100010428) | 2106 Ashe Boulevard; 34°46′52″N 87°40′05″W | Sheffield vicinity | |
| 15 | Muscle Shoals Sound Studio | Muscle Shoals Sound Studio | June 2, 2006 (#06000437) | 3614 Jackson Highway; 34°46′05″N 87°40′27″W | Sheffield | |
| 16 | E.L. Newman Lustron House | E.L. Newman Lustron House | February 24, 2000 (#00000134) | 1406 34th St. 34°46′14″N 87°40′49″W | Sheffield | |
| 17 | Nitrate Village No. 1 Historic District | Nitrate Village No. 1 Historic District | August 30, 1984 (#84000603) | Roughly bounded by Wilson Dam Circle, Wheeler and Wilson Dam Aves., Fontana, and Pickwick Sts. 34°44′32″N 87°43′14″W | Sheffield vicinity | |
| 18 | Felix Grundy Norman House | Felix Grundy Norman House | April 12, 1984 (#84000749) | 401 N. Main St. 34°44′08″N 87°42′14″W | Tuscumbia | |
| 19 | The Oaks | The Oaks | November 7, 1976 (#76000319) | Southeast of Tuscumbia off State Route 157 on Ricks Lane; 34°40′27″N 87°35′36″W | Tuscumbia vicinity | |
| 20 | Old Brick Presbyterian Church | Old Brick Presbyterian Church | January 9, 1989 (#88003078) | Old Brick Rd., north of Leighton; 34°46′14″N 87°31′28″W | Muscle Shoals vicinity | |
| 21 | Preuit Oaks | Preuit Oaks | May 8, 1986 (#86000997) | Cotton Town Rd. 34°40′26″N 87°30′35″W | Leighton vicinity | |
| 22 | John Daniel Rather House | John Daniel Rather House | December 16, 1982 (#82001603) | 209 S. Cave St. 34°43′50″N 87°41′56″W | Tuscumbia | |
| 23 | Rock Creek Archeological District (ACt44, ACt45) | | June 26, 1990 (#88003068) | Address Restricted | Maud | |
| 24 | St. John's Episcopal Church | St. John's Episcopal Church | November 13, 2018 (#100001876) | 300 N. Dickson St. 34°44′04″N 87°42′07″W | Tuscumbia | |
| 25 | Seven Mile Island Archeological District | | April 16, 1979 (#79003352) | Address Restricted | Sheffield vicinity | |
| 26 | Sheffield Downtown Commercial Historic District | Sheffield Downtown Commercial Historic District | May 24, 2010 (#10000271) | 1st and 5th Sts. and Pittsburgh and Columbia Aves. 34°45′39″N 87°41′59″W | Sheffield | |
| 27 | Sheffield Residential Historic District | Sheffield Residential Historic District | May 16, 2002 (#02000481) | Roughly bounded by Riverside Pike, River Bluff Dr., Wood, 3rd, and 2nd Sts., 15th Ave., 27th St., and 19th Ave. 34°45′56″N 87°41′51″W | Sheffield | |
| 28 | Tuscumbia Historic District | Tuscumbia Historic District | May 23, 1985 (#85001158) | Roughly bounded by N. and E. Commons, 8th St. and Spring Rd., Hooks, W. 5th and S. Milton, including Steel Bridge; 34°43′59″N 87°42′07″W | Tuscumbia | |
| 29 | Tuscumbia Landing Site | Tuscumbia Landing Site | June 10, 1982 (#82002002) | West of Sheffield; 34°44′56″N 87°43′31″W | Sheffield | |
| 30 | WZZA Radio Station | | May 28, 2025 (#100011916) | 1570 Woodmont Drive; 34°42′30″N 87°41′33″W | Tuscumbia | |
| 31 | Wilson Dam | Wilson Dam | November 13, 1966 (#66000147) | On the Tennessee River along State Route 133; 34°48′04″N 87°37′38″W | Florence vicinity | Extends into Lauderdale County |
| 32 | William Winston House | William Winston House | April 15, 1982 (#82002005) | N. Commons St. 34°44′18″N 87°42′04″W | Tuscumbia | |

== See also ==
- List of National Historic Landmarks in Alabama
- National Register of Historic Places listings in Alabama
