= Felix Grundy Norman House =

Historic house in Alabama, United States

- U.S. National Register of Historic Places
- U.S. Historic district – Contributing property
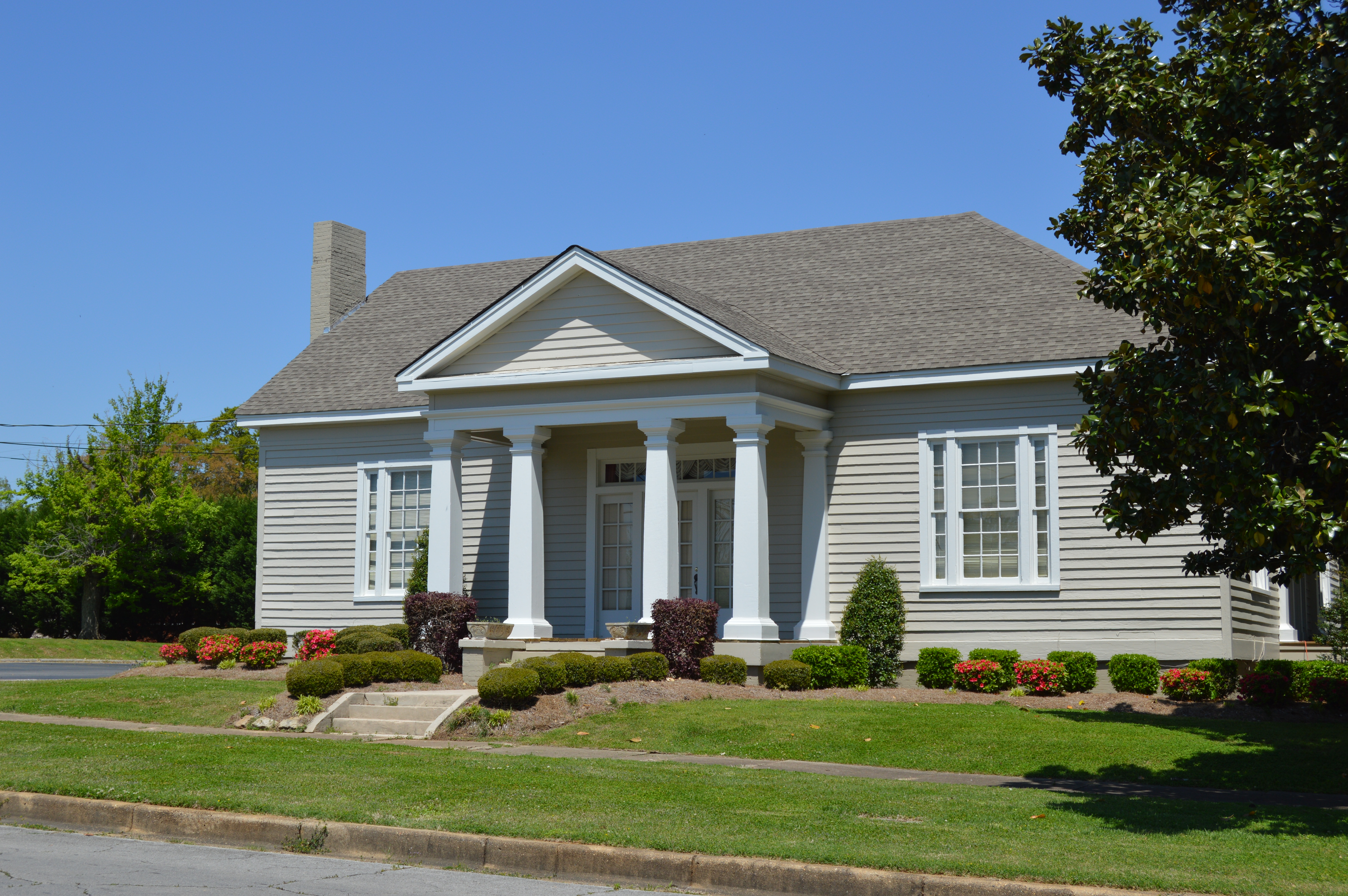
- The house in April 2014

- Location within Alabama Location within the United States
- Location: 401 N. Main St., Tuscumbia, Alabama
- Coordinates: 34°44′7″N 87°42′14″W
- Area: less than one acre
- Built: 1851
- Architectural style: Greek Revival
- Part of: Tuscumbia Historic District (ID85001158)
- NRHP reference No.: 84000749
- Designated CP: April 12, 1984

The Felix Grundy Norman House is a historic residence in Tuscumbia, Alabama, United States. The house was built in 1851 by Felix Grundy Norman, a lawyer who also served as mayor of Tuscumbia and in the Alabama Legislature from 1841 to 1845 and 1847–48. Norman's father-in-law was the land agent for the sale of the Chickasaw lands, and his brother-in-law, Armistead Barton, built Barton Hall in nearby Cherokee, Alabama.

The house sits on the corner of Main and Second Street, and has two identical façades facing each street. Each face has a central pedimented portico supported by four Tuscan columns. Each portico is flanked by tri-part windows consisting of a nine-over-nine sash window bordered by narrow three-over-three sashes. The interior retains its Greek Revival woodwork and mantels.

The house was listed on the National Register of Historic Places in 1984.
