= Buzzard Roost, Alabama =

Unincorporated community in Alabama, United States

- Unincorporated community
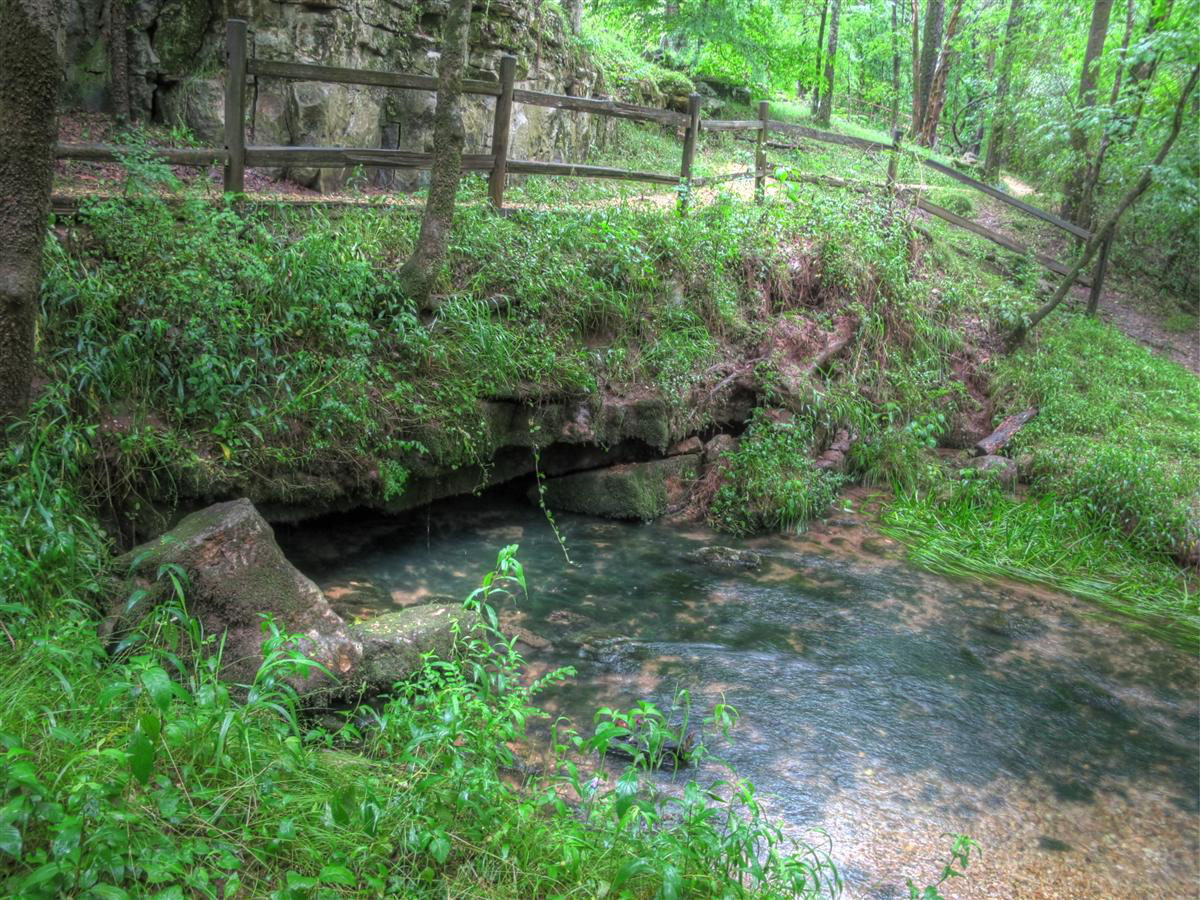
- Buzzard Roost Spring

- Location in Alabama.
- Coordinates: 34°45′40″N 88°01′26″W
- Country: United States
- State: Alabama
- County: Colbert
- Elevation: 466 ft (142 m)

Population
  - Total: 12
- Time zone: UTC-6 (Central (CST))
  - Summer (DST): UTC-5 (CDT)
- Area code: 256

Buzzard Roost is an unincorporated community in Colbert County, Alabama, United States. Buzzard Roost had a post office in the 1850s, but it no longer exists.

== Geography ==
Buzzard Roost is located three miles west of Cherokee on U.S. Route 72.

== History ==
Bernard Romans' Map of 1772 indicated a place called "Chickianooe", which appears to be a misprint of the Choctaw word Chickianoce, Skeki anusi or anosi, meaning 'buzzards there sleep'. Levi Colbert, Chickasaw Bench Chief, built his stand in Buzzard Roost in 1801. He ran an inn there with his family. An exhibit telling his story is part of the Natchez Trace Parkway. He is credited with changing the name from Buzzard Sleep to Buzzard Roost. In the 1840s, Armstead Barton built Barton Hall, also known as the Cunningham Plantation, an antebellum plantation house. Buzzard Roost was a stop on the Memphis and Charleston Railroad, between Iuka, Mississippi, and Cherokee Station, Alabama.

Buzzard Roost Covered Bridge, built over Buzzard Roost Creek in 1860, was 94 ft (29 m) long, and located on "Allsboro Rd., which is part of the Natchez Trace Parkway System". It was destroyed by fire on July 15, 1972. In 1958, a type of spear point dating from the Early to an early Middle Archaic period, the Buzzard Roost Creek Point, was named after a site on Buzzard Roost Creek, by James W. Cambron. Buzzard Roost was added to the National Register of Historic Places November 7, 1976. As of 2011, a Pratt pony truss bridge built over Buzzard Roost Creek in 1940 remains, although it is rated "structurally deficient."
