= Barton Hall (disambiguation) =

Barton Hall is field house on the campus of Cornell University, USA

Barton Hall may also refer to most notable buildings:

- Barton Hall (Alabama), plantation house near Cherokee, Alabama, USA
- RAF Barton Hall, former RAF station and country house in the parish of Barton, Preston, England
- Barton Hall, a country house in the parish of Barton Turf, Norfolk
