= Barton, Alabama =

Unincorporated community in Alabama, United States

- Unincorporated community
- Location in Alabama.
- Coordinates: 34°44′19″N 87°53′28″W
- Country: United States
- State: Alabama
- County: Colbert
- Elevation: 482 ft (147 m)
- Time zone: UTC-6 (Central (CST))
  - Summer (DST): UTC-5 (CDT)
- ZIP code: 35616
- Area code: 256
- GNIS feature ID: 113523

Barton, also known as Barton Station, Barton Depot, or Barton's, is an unincorporated community located in western Colbert County, Alabama, United States. It is about ten miles west of the county seat of Tuscumbia, and just south of Tennessee River. The community is about four miles southeast of Cherokee on US Route 72.

== History ==
Barton was settled as a station along the Memphis and Charleston Railroad. It was originally known as Barton Depot or Barton Station. Barton was founded in 1906 and named for Armistead Barton, a businessman from Tuscumbia who built Barton Hall and owned land in the area.

Between December 1862 and October 1863, several skirmishes took place in Barton as part of the American Civil War. Confederate forces sought to prevent the Union Army from invading the Tennessee Valley from their stronghold in Corinth, Mississippi. On December 12, 1862, the 1st Alabama Cavalry Regiment under the command of Col. T. W. Sweeny engaged troops under the command of Col. Phillip Roddey. On April 17, 1863, the 1st Alabama Cavalry and 10th Missouri Volunteer Cavalry under the command of Gen. Grenville M. Dodge fought CSA forces under the command of Col. Roddey. October 20, 1863 saw the 3d Cavalry Regiment, 5th Ohio Cavalry, and Landgraeber's Battery under the command of Gen. Peter Joseph Osterhaus engage CSA forces under the command of Col. Jeff Forrest. On October 25, 1863, Union forces, including the 13th Illinois Volunteer Infantry Regiment and 76th Ohio Infantry under the command of Gen. Osterhaus fought CSA forces commanded by Lieutenant General Stephen D. Lee.

A post office was operated in Barton from 1859 to 1972.

== Notable person ==
- Cecil Dowdy, former professional football player
- Powell Johnson, inventor of the Eye Protector, Patent No 234,039
