= Cherokee Middle School =

Coordinates: 34.73750°N 87.88933°W

- CMS
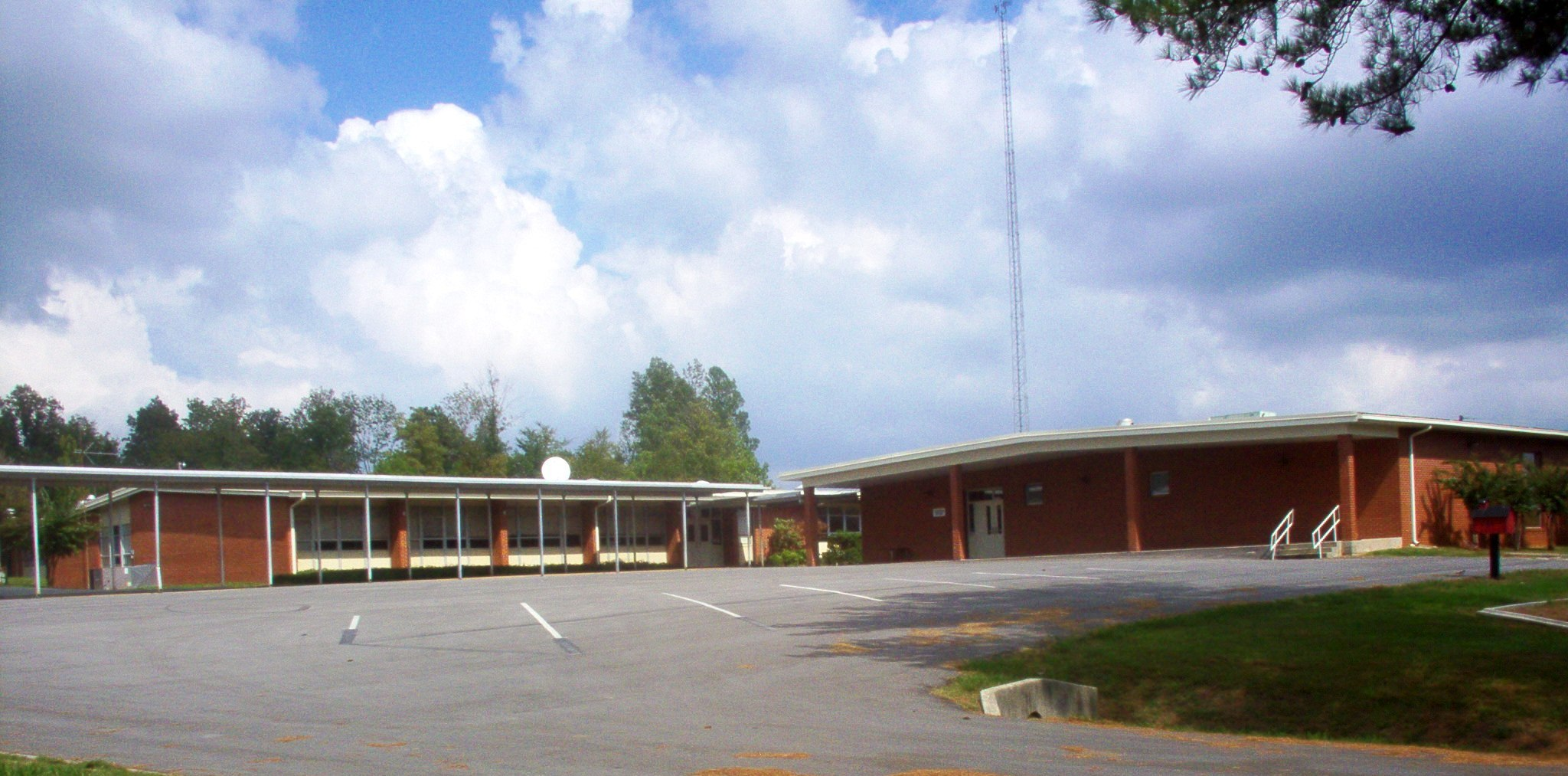
- Cherokee Middle School in September 2007

Location
- 4595 Old Lee Hwy; Cherokee, Alabama; US

Information
- Type: Middle School
- Established: 1971 (as CMS) Closed in 2007
- School district: Colbert County Schools
- Grades: 5 - 8
- Colors: Royal Blue & Vegas Gold
- Mascot: Indians
- Accreditation: Southern Association of Colleges and Schools
- Yearbook: Traces
- Historic Name: Cherokee High School
- Historic Significance: An original Rosenwald School.
- Website: http://www.colbert.k12.al.us/cms
- Originally named Cherokee High School and was the segregated school for African American children.

Cherokee Middle School was located at the eastern limits of Cherokee, Alabama on the north side of County Road 20. It served the children of western Colbert County for grades 5 through 8. The decline of population in the western portion of the county caused the school to close at the end of the 2006 – 2007 school year and the grades merged into Cherokee High School and Cherokee Elementary.

== History ==
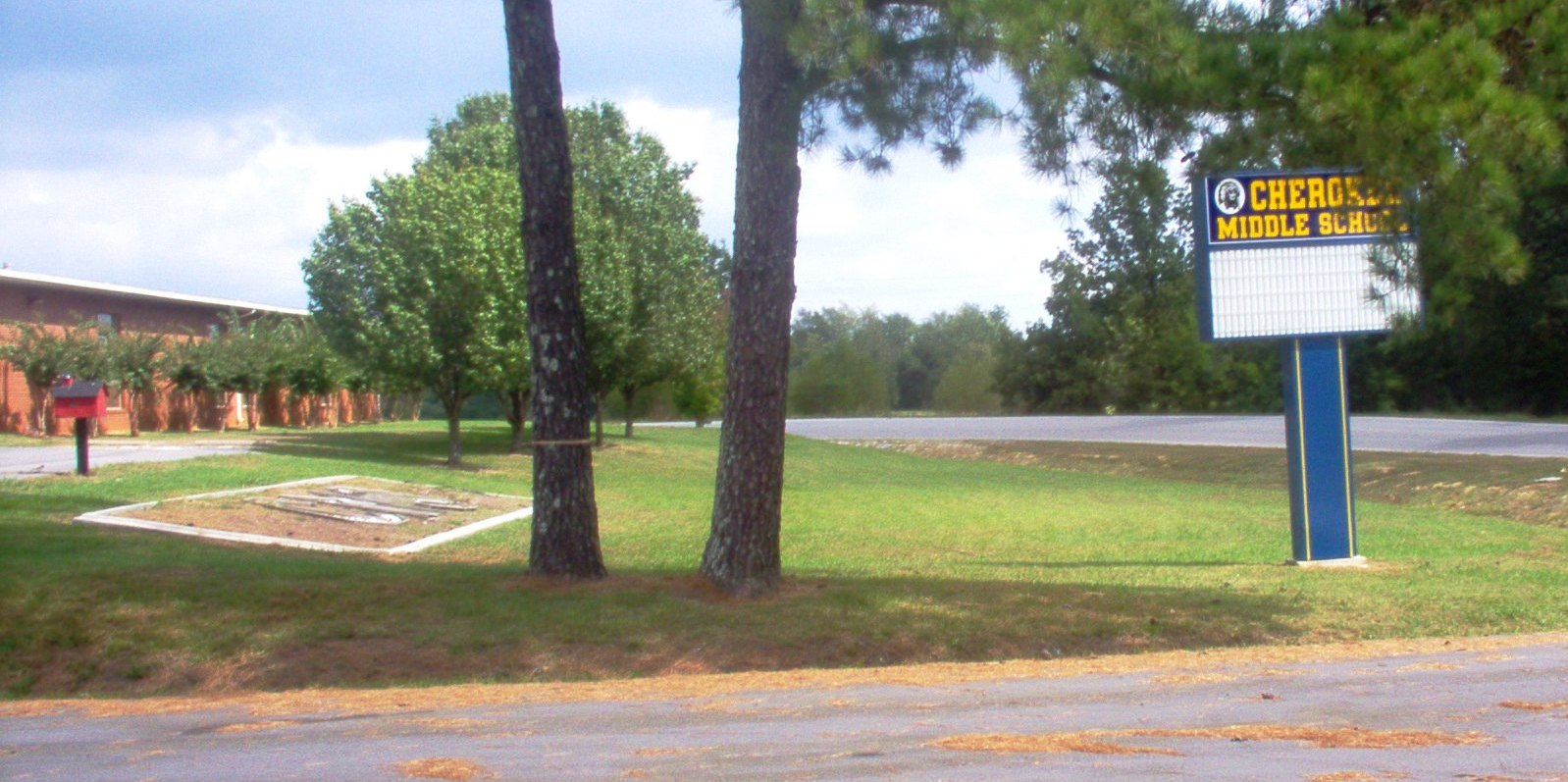

Cherokee Middle School was originally Cherokee High School and designated the segregated school for African American children. It was an original Rosenwald School. At that time the segregated school for “white” children was named Cherokee Vocational High School. After the original junior high school building (located on the Cherokee Vocation High School campus) burned in January 1971 Cherokee Middle School began handling grades 5 through 8. The original building was removed in the 1980s and now the oldest buildings on the campus were in built in the 1960s.

== See also ==
The Rosenwald Schools Initiative
