= Cherokee High School (Alabama) =

Coordinates: 34.76568°N 87.96320°W

- CHS

Location
- 850 High School Drive; Cherokee, Alabama 35616; United States

Information
- Type: Secondary School
- Established: 1925 (101 years ago)
- School district: Colbert County Schools
- CEEB code: 010655
- Principal: Shannon Edmonson
- Teaching staff: 20.00 (FTE)
- Grades: 5-12
- Enrollment: 210 (2023–2024)
- Student to teacher ratio: 10.50
- Colors: Blue and vegas gold
- Mascot: Indians
- Accreditation: Southern Association of Colleges and Schools
- ACT average: 25.8 in 2009
- Yearbook: Hobachee
- Fight song: The Victors
- Website: chs.colbertk12.org
- Originally named Cherokee Vocational High School

Cherokee High School is located in Cherokee, Alabama and serves the western portion of Colbert County as part of the Colbert County School system. It is located along County Road 21 (North Pike).

== History ==
Cherokee High School was founded in 1925 as Cherokee Vocational High School as it was the first designated vocational school in Colbert County. The school provides both academic and general diplomas and has dropped the "Vocational" part of the name. The first graduating class consisted of 22 students.

The original high school building was located where the current gymnasium stands. As the school expanded with the end of segregation in 1968 the old high school became the junior high school. That building burned on January 21, 1971. The original segregated school for African Americans became Cherokee Middle School and contained grades 5 through 8. That school closed at the end of the 2006/2007 school year and is being consolidated into Cherokee Elementary and Cherokee High Schools.

== Athletics ==
Cherokee High School is a member of the Alabama High School Athletic Association Class 1A. The school colors are Blue and gold. The school mascot is the "Indians".

=== Baseball ===
From 1951 to 1973 the school did not field a baseball team. Only the city league was available to the players.

== Notable alumni ==
- Senator Bobby Denton
- Cecil Dowdy - University of Alabama football star during the coaching years of Paul "Bear" Bryant.
