= Dominique Croom =

American football player (born 1991)

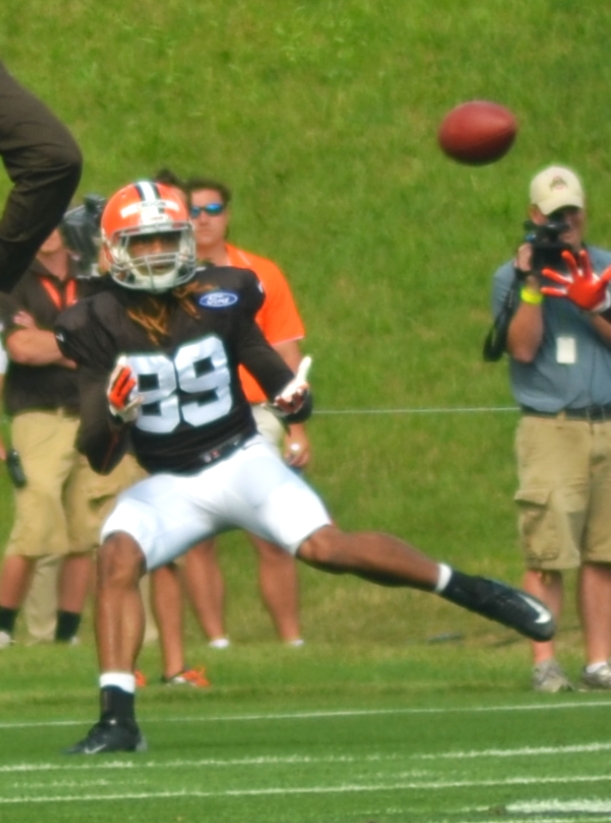
- Croom with the Browns in 2013

Profile
- Position: Wide receiver

Personal information
- Born: April 26, 1991 (age 35); Cherokee, Alabama, U.S.
- Listed height: 6 ft 2 in (1.88 m)
- Listed weight: 190 lb (86 kg)

Career information
- College: Central Arkansas
- NFL draft: 2013: undrafted

Career history
- Cleveland Browns (2013)*; Atlanta Falcons (2013)*
- * Offseason or practice squad member only
- Stats at Pro Football Reference

Dominique Croom (born April 26, 1991) is a former American football wide receiver. He was signed as an undrafted free agent by the Cleveland Browns in 2013, and was later a practice squad member of the Atlanta Falcons. He played college football at Central Arkansas.

== Professional career ==
=== Cleveland Browns ===
After going unselected in the 2013 NFL draft, Croom signed with the Cleveland Browns on May 28, 2013. He was released on August 27.

=== Atlanta Falcons ===
Croom was signed to the practice squad of the Atlanta Falcons on November 27, 2013. He was waived on June 24, 2014.
