= Belle Mont =

Historic house in Alabama, United States

- U.S. National Register of Historic Places
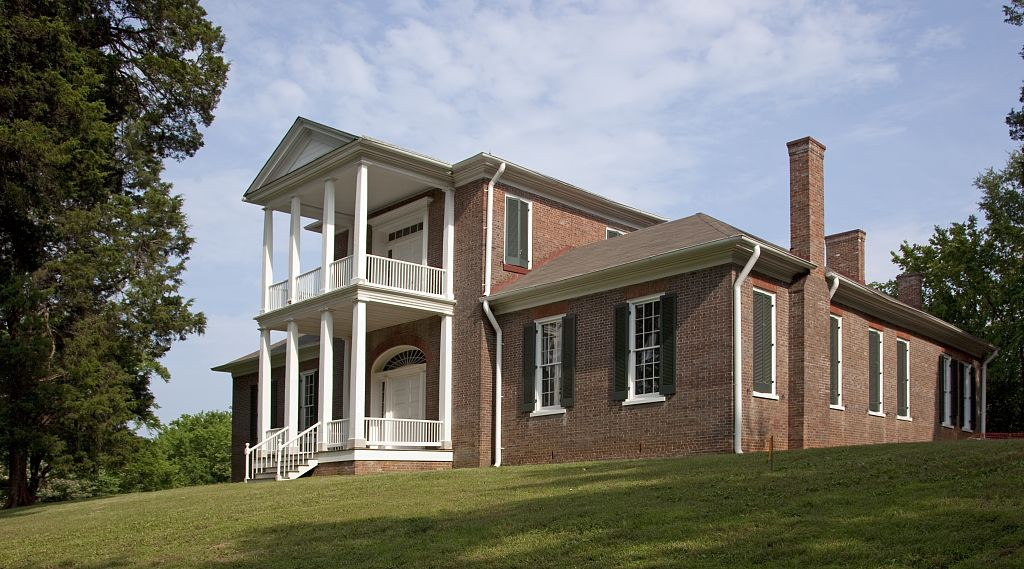
- Belle Mont in 2010

- Location within Alabama Location within the United States
- Interactive map showing the location of Belle Mont
- Nearest city: Tuscumbia, Alabama
- Coordinates: 34°39′43.18″N 87°40′01.51″W
- Area: 5.5 acres (2.2 ha)
- Built: 1828-1832
- Architectural style: Jeffersonian
- NRHP reference No.: 82002003
- Added to NRHP: February 23, 1982

Belle Mont is a historic Jeffersonian-style plantation house near Tuscumbia in Colbert County, Alabama, United States. It was added to the National Register of Historic Places on February 23, 1982, due to its architectural significance.

== History ==
Belle Mont was built between 1828 and 1832 for Dr. Alexander W. Mitchell, a native of Virginia. Mitchell, a graduate of the University of Edinburgh, was also one of the first large-scale planters and slaveholders in the area. Mitchell sold the 1,680-acre (680 ha) plantation to another Virginia native, Isaac Winston, in 1833. It remained in the Winston family until 1941. The house and 33 acres (13 ha) were donated to the Alabama Historical Commission in 1983. It has been undergoing a phased restoration since that time and is currently operated as a historic house museum.

== Architecture ==
Considered by architectural scholars to be a clear example of Thomas Jefferson's influence upon the architecture of the early United States, Belle Mont is one of only a few surviving examples of Jeffersonian architecture in the Deep South. Built in red brick, it features a raised, two story central section with flanking one-story wings. The side wings project toward the rear in a U-shape, forming a semi-enclosed rear courtyard.

== See also ==
- National Register of Historic Places listings in Colbert County, Alabama
