= Colbert County Schools =

School district in Alabama

Colbert County Schools is the school system serving Colbert County, Alabama. As of 2021 Chris Hand was superintendent.

== Member schools ==
- Cherokee Elementary School
- Cherokee High School
- Hatton Elementary School
- Leighton Elementary School
- Colbert County High School
- Colbert Heights Elementary School
- Colbert Heights High School
- New Bethel Elementary School

== Previous schools (closed) ==
- Cherokee Middle School closed in 2007.
- Underwood Elementary School

Barton Elementary School
