= Ford City, Alabama =

Unincorporated community in Alabama, United States

- Unincorporated community
- Location within Alabama Location within the United States
- Coordinates: 34°47′09″N 87°31′43″W
- Country: United States
- State: Alabama
- County: Colbert
- Elevation: 548 ft (167 m)
- Time zone: UTC-6 (Central (CST))
  - Summer (DST): UTC-5 (CDT)
- Area codes: 256 & 938
- GNIS feature ID: 118478

Ford City is an unincorporated community in Colbert County, Alabama, United States. Ford City is located at the junction of County Highways 40 and 48, 8.4 miles (13.5 km) east-northeast of Muscle Shoals. The Clyde Carter House is listed on the National Register of Historic Places.
