= Clyde Carter House =

Historic house in Alabama, United States

- U.S. National Register of Historic Places
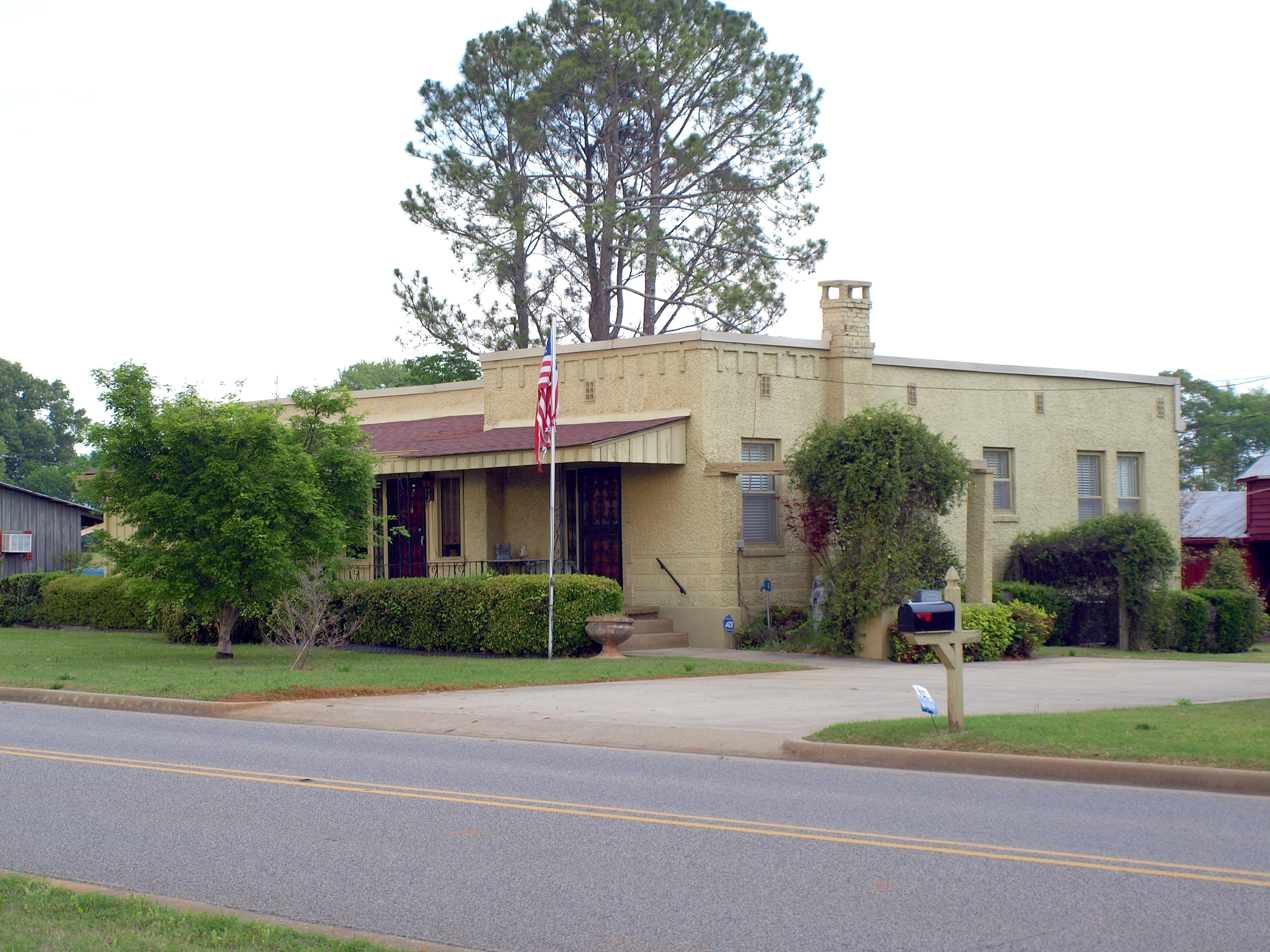
- The house in April 2017

- Location within Alabama Location within the United States
- Location: 300 Lime Kiln Rd., Ford City, Alabama
- Coordinates: 34°47′25″N 87°31′41″W
- Area: 24 acres (9.7 ha)
- Built: 1924
- Built by: Natale Fortuna
- Architectural style: Spanish eclectic
- NRHP reference No.: 04000559
- Added to NRHP: June 2, 2004

The Clyde Carter House is a historic residence in Ford City, Alabama, United States. Built at a time of vast land speculation in Colbert County, the house represents the then-fashionable Spanish eclectic style not commonly found in the rural deep South. The house was listed on the National Register of Historic Places in 2004.

== History ==
The house was built in 1924, amid a period of land speculation throughout The Shoals. In 1921, industrialist Henry Ford offered to buy two ammonium nitrate plants (constructed to manufacture ammunition, but which Ford would repurpose for fertilizer) and the partially completed Wilson Dam from the government. Ford later proposed to build an industrial city stretching for 75 mi (121 km) along the Tennessee River to Huntsville. Developers began buying farmland to build subdivisions and towns. One company, the Bernard Home Building Company, based in Baltimore, Maryland, purchased land to develop in an area they named Ford City. They began construction on one house, in Spanish Eclectic style, before Ford abandoned his plans in the face of opposition from Congress.

The house was purchased at auction in 1930 by Clyde and Cleo Carter after the builder defaulted on the mortgage. Carter finished the house and worked the surrounding lands, planting corn and cotton, eventually acquiring 24 acres (10 ha). Due to its proximity to Wilson Dam, the house was one of the first to have electrical service after the Rural Electrification Act. After Clyde Carter died in 1958, his wife Cleo lived in the house until her death in 1972. The Carters' daughters owned the house until 2000, when a granddaughter inherited the house.

== Architecture ==
The Spanish eclectic architectural style was first exhibited at the Panama–California Exposition in San Diego in 1915. Bertram Goodhue, the exposition's designer, combined Spanish Colonial and Mission Revival architecture with cues from other styles with ties to Spain, including Byzantine, Medieval, Renaissance, and Baroque. The style took hold in the years following World War I as an offshoot of the more popular Spanish Colonial Revival style. It was most widely seen in Southern California and Florida, including homes built for screenwriter Frances Marion, director Cecil B. DeMille, and actor Charlie Chaplin.

The Clyde Carter house has a flat, parapet roof, with a decorative course of brick. The façade is clad in stucco, and the base is scored to mimic a stone finish. The main entrance has a sidelight and is flanked by two single-pane windows. The elaborate metal storm door and front porch balustrade are obvious cues of the Spanish Eclectic style. When Carter finished the house in the 1930s, he added a screened porch with a gable roof; this was destroyed in a 1972 tornado and partially enclosed with board and batten siding to create a sunroom. A porte-cochère extends from the south side of the house, covering a courtyard garden with a dogwood and Confederate jasmine. The interior retains its original wood panel doors, baseboards, and crown molding.
