= Sheffield Residential Historic District =

Historic district in Alabama, United States

- U.S. National Register of Historic Places
- U.S. Historic district
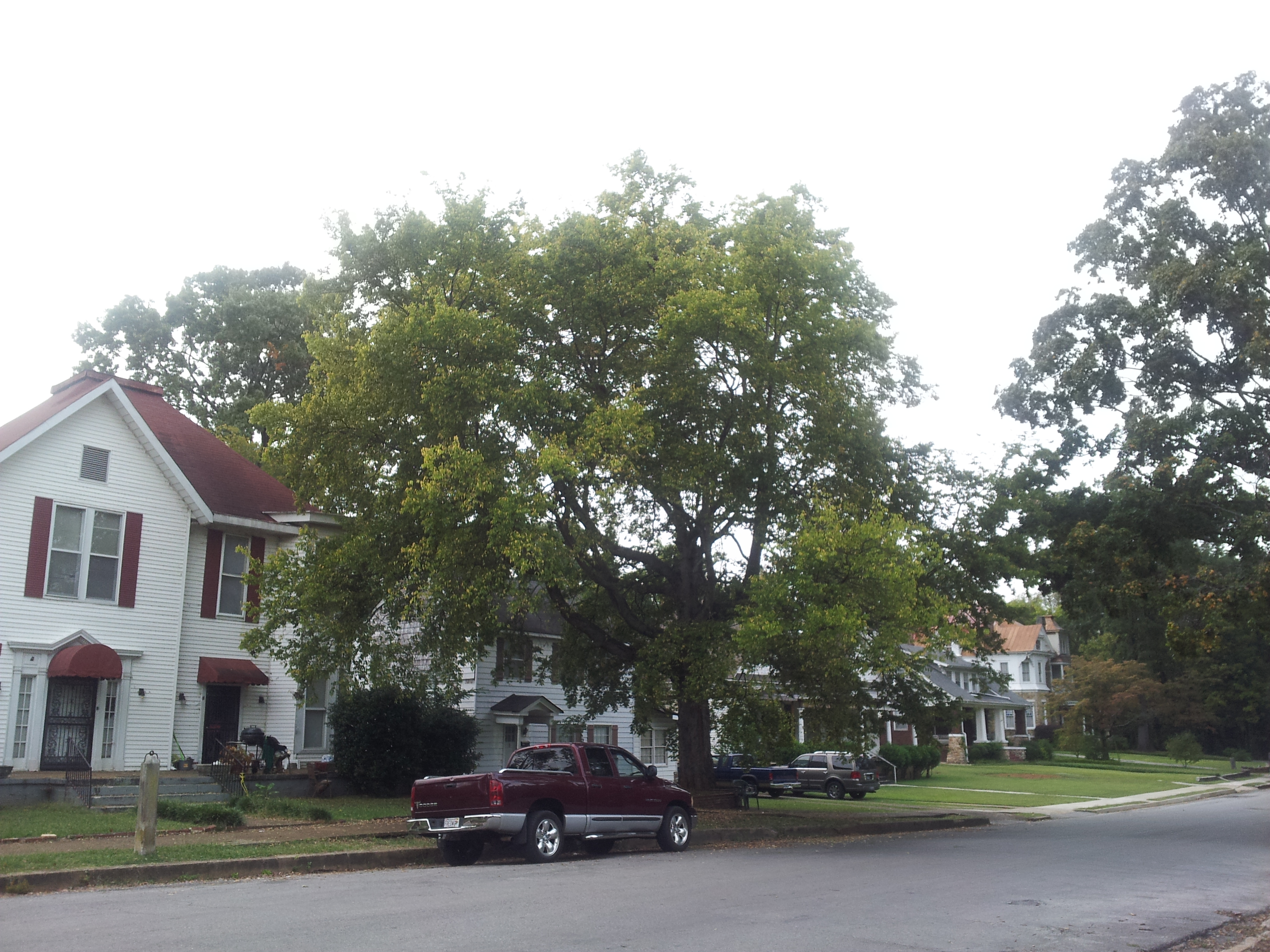
- Houses in the district in September 2012

- Location within Alabama Location within the United States
- Location: Roughly bounded by Riverside Pk, River Bluff Dr., Wood, Third, Second Sts., 15th Ave., 27th St., and 19th Ave., Sheffield, Alabama
- Coordinates: 34°45′56″N 87°41′51″W
- Area: 160 acres (65 ha)
- NRHP reference No.: 02000481
- Added to NRHP: May 16, 2002

The Sheffield Residential Historic District is a historic district in Sheffield, Alabama, United States. The district contains 678 contributing properties covering 160 acres (65 ha) that represent the growth of the town from its founding in the 1880s through the 1950s. The town of Sheffield was founded in 1883, on the former site of a town known as York Bluff. Montgomery banker Alfred Moses founded the Sheffield Land, Iron, and Coal Company and began laying out streets in a north–south grid. Soon after the initial land sale in the town, five iron blast furnaces were built, along with landings and docks along the Tennessee River. Other industries and commercial businesses followed. The upper classes built large Victorian houses along the bluff overlooking the river, while more restrained Victorian cottages were built closer to the industrial district. A two-story commercial district, several churches, and a school were also built in the late 1880s.

The town's economy suffered during the Panic of 1893, revived only in 1898 when the Southern Railway Company located its headquarters in Sheffield. Other industrial and commercial development followed through the 1900s, however residential construction did not resume in earnest until the mid-1900s. Development was spurred again in 1916, with the construction of Wilson Dam and two ammonium nitrate plants. Several apartment buildings (including one in Pueblo Revival style), as well as numerous bungalows and Colonial Revival houses were built to house the influx of people. Following World War II, a number of ranch houses were constructed throughout the district.

The district was listed on the National Register of Historic Places in 2002.
