= Sheffield Downtown Commercial Historic District =

Historic district in Alabama, United States

- U.S. National Register of Historic Places
- U.S. Historic district
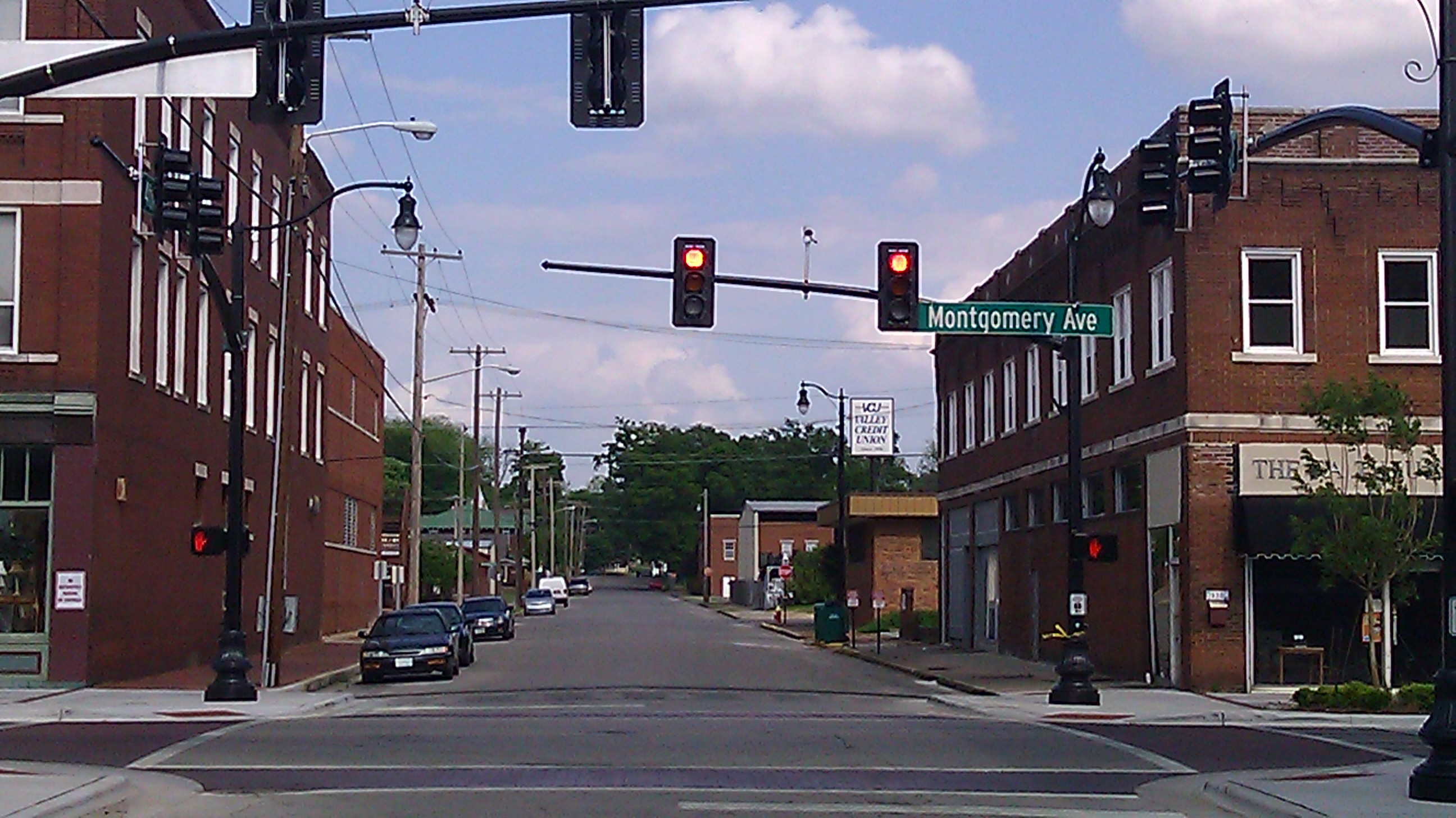

- Location within Alabama Location within the United States
- Location: 1st & 5th Sts., Pittsburgh & Columbia Aves., Sheffield, Alabama
- Coordinates: 34°45′39″N 87°41′59″W
- Area: 47 acres (19 ha)
- Architect: Griffith, Howard Jr.
- Architectural style: Renaissance Revival, High Victorian Gothic, Moderne
- NRHP reference No.: 10000271
- Added to NRHP: May 24, 2010

The Sheffield Downtown Commercial Historic District is a historic district in downtown Sheffield, Alabama, United States. The buildings in the district were mostly built from 1888 to 1959 and have served a variety of purposes. Significant commercial buildings in the district include the Sheffield Hardware Company building, the Blake Building, and the Montgomery Block. Many of the city's important government buildings, including the Fire Department-City Hall building, Chamber of Commerce, and post office, are also part of the district. Various architectural styles can be seen in the district, including Renaissance Revival, High Victorian Gothic, and Moderne. The district was added to the National Register of Historic Places on May 24, 2010.
