= Cherokee, Alabama =

- Town
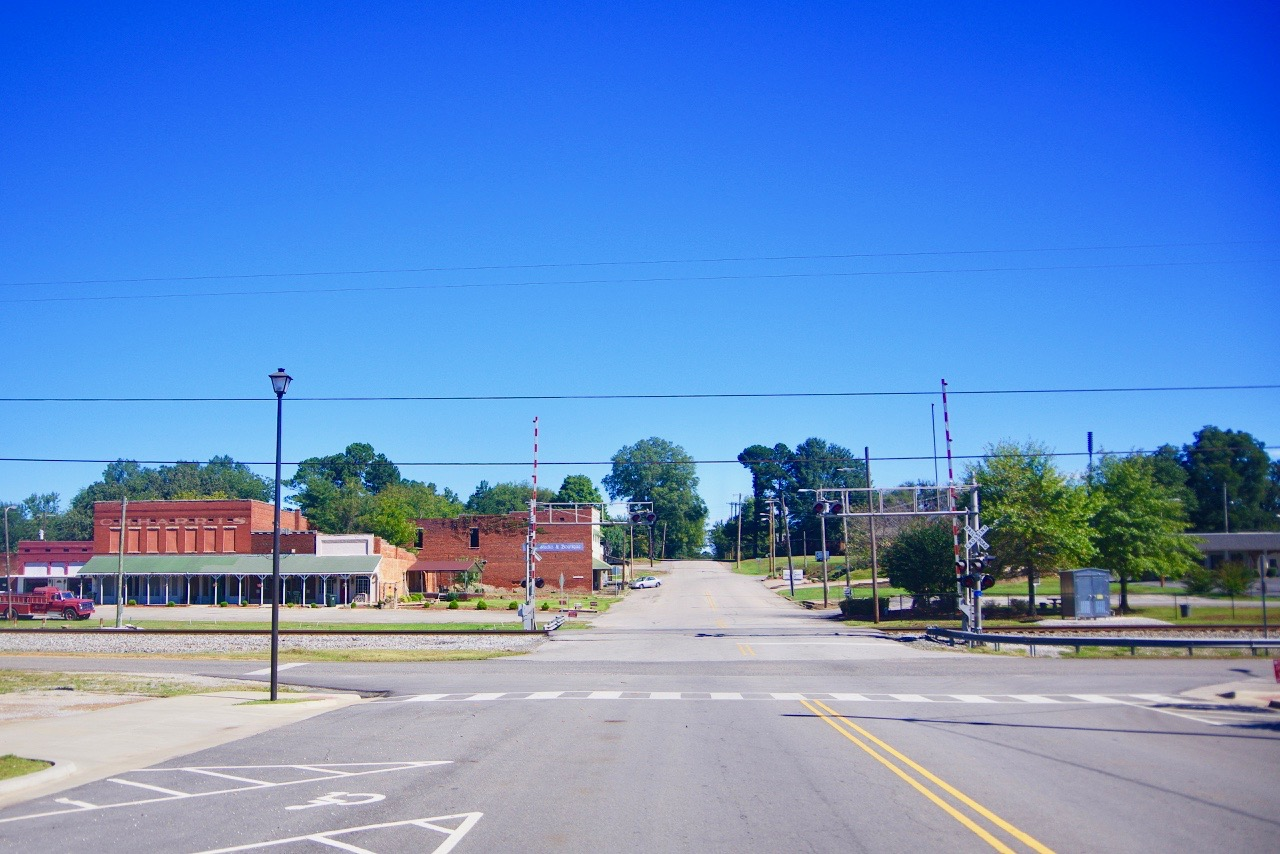
- Cherokee

- Seal

- Location of Cherokee in Colbert County, Alabama.
- Coordinates: 34°45′14″N 87°57′56″W
- Country: United States
- State: Alabama
- County: Colbert
- Established: November 2020

Government
  - Type: Mayor–council government

Area
  - Total: 2.22 sq mi (5.74 km^{2})
  - Land: 2.22 sq mi (5.74 km^{2})
  - Water: 0 sq mi (0.00 km^{2})
- Elevation: 518 ft (158 m)

Population (2020)
  - Total: 970
  - Density: 437.6/sq mi (168.97/km^{2})
- Time zone: UTC-6 (Central)
  - Summer (DST): UTC-5 (Central)
- ZIP code: 35616
- Area code: 256
- FIPS code: 01-14152
- GNIS feature ID: 2406262

Cherokee is a town in west Colbert County, Alabama, United States. Located near the Tennessee River, it is part of the Florence–Muscle Shoals metropolitan area, known as "The Shoals". As of the 2020 census, Cherokee had a population of 970.

== History ==
Cherokee was incorporated December 7, 1871 making it the second oldest incorporated municipality in Colbert County. While located along the Tennessee River, the town was started as a stop along the Memphis and Charleston Railroad during the late 1850s and early 1860s.

== Geography ==
Cherokee is situated along U.S. Route 72 west of Muscle Shoals and a few miles east of the Alabama-Mississippi state line. The Tennessee River passes to the northeast. Via US-72, Tuscumbia, the county seat of Colbert County, is 18 mi (29 km) east, and Iuka, Mississippi is 14 mi (23 km) northwest.

According to the U.S. Census Bureau, Cherokee has a total area of 2.2 square miles (5.7 km^{2}), all land.

=== Climate ===
Average Temperatures
	Average Low	Average High
January	26 °F	47 °F
April	44 °F	71 °F
July	66 °F	89 °F
October	44 °F	72 °F

- Annual Precipitation 60.6 inches

== Demographics ==
Historical population
Census	Pop.	Note	%±
1880	282		—
1900	261		—
1910	269		3.1%
1920	524		94.8%
1930	659		25.8%
1940	786		19.3%
1950	748		−4.8%
1960	1,349		80.3%
1970	1,484		10.0%
1980	1,589		7.1%
1990	1,479		−6.9%
2000	1,237		−16.4%
2010	1,048		−15.3%
2020	970		−7.4%
U.S. Decennial Census; 2013 Estimate

=== Racial and ethnic composition ===
Cherokee town, Alabama – Racial and ethnic composition Note: the US Census treats Hispanic/Latino as an ethnic category. This table excludes Latinos from the racial categories and assigns them to a separate category. Hispanics/Latinos may be of any race. Race and ethnicity were not surveyed for populations under 2,500 in the 1980 census and under 1,000 in 1990 census.
Race / Ethnicity (NH = Non-Hispanic)	Pop 1990	Pop 2000	Pop 2010	Pop 2020	% 1990	% 2000	% 2010	% 2020
White alone (NH)	1,196	963	809	731	80.87%	77.85%	77.19%	75.36%
Black or African American alone (NH)	281	250	192	181	19.00%	20.21%	18.32%	18.66%
Native American or Alaska Native alone (NH)	1	4	5	0	0.07%	0.32%	0.48%	0.00%
Asian alone (NH)	0	0	3	0	0.00%	0.00%	0.29%	0.00%
Native Hawaiian or Pacific Islander alone (NH)	x	0	0	0	x	0.00%	0.00%	0.00%
Other race alone (NH)	0	0	0	1	0.00%	0.00%	0.00%	0.10%
Mixed race or Multiracial (NH)	x	14	21	40	x	1.13%	2.00%	4.12%
Hispanic or Latino (any race)	1	6	18	17	0.07%	0.49%	1.72%	1.75%
Total	1,479	1,237	1,048	970	100.00%	100.00%	100.00%	100.00%

=== 2020 census ===
As of the 2020 United States census, there were 970 people, 364 households, and 242 families residing in the town.

=== 2010 census ===
As of the census of 2010, there were 1,048 people, 452 households, and 315 families residing in the town. The population density was 473 inhabitants per square mile (183/km^{2}). There were 529 housing units at an average density of 240.5 per square mile (92.9/km^{2}). The racial makeup of the town was 77.6% White, 18.3% Black or African American, 0.5% Native American, and 2.3% from two or more races. 1.7% of the population were Hispanic or Latino of any race.

There were 452 households, out of which 25.4% had children under the age of 18 living with them, 47.6% were married couples living together, 16.8% had a female householder with no husband present, and 30.3% were non-families. 26.8% of all households were made up of individuals, and 14.6% had someone living alone who was 65 years of age or older. The average household size was 2.32 and the average family size was 2.78.

In the town, the population was spread out, with 21.3% under the age of 18, 7.2% from 18 to 24, 22.8% from 25 to 44, 27.1% from 45 to 64, and 21.7% who were 65 years of age or older. The median age was 44.1 years. For every 100 females, there were 95.5 males. For every 100 females age 18 and over, there were 102.0 males.

The median income for a household in the town was $36,875, and the median income for a family was $41,250. Males had a median income of $37,581 versus $23,421 for females. The per capita income for the town was $18,038. About 20.5% of families and 20.9% of the population were below the poverty line, including 36.1% of those under age 18 and 12.2% of those age 65 or over.

=== 2000 census ===
As of the census of 2000, there were 1,237 people, 510 households, and 370 families residing in the town. The population density was 552.5 inhabitants per square mile (213.3/km^{2}). There were 557 housing units at an average density of 248.8 per square mile (96.1/km^{2}). The racial makeup of the town was 78.33% White, 20.21% Black or African American, 0.32% Native American, and 1.13% from two or more races. 0.49% of the population were Hispanic or Latino of any race.

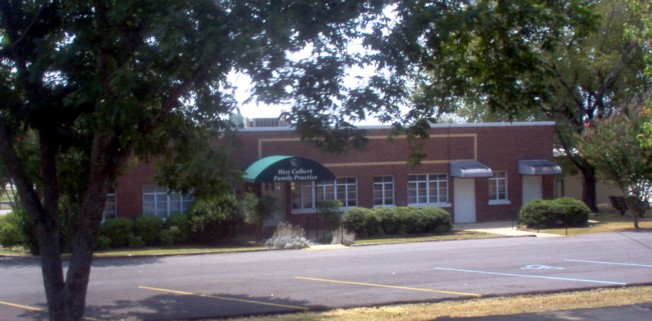
West Colbert Family Practice provides health care for Cherokee and western Colbert County.

There were 510 households, out of which 30.0% had children under the age of 18 living with them, 51.8% were married couples living together, 16.5% had a female householder with no husband present, and 27.3% were non-families. 25.3% of all households were made up of individuals, and 13.5% had someone living alone who was 65 years of age or older. The average household size was 2.43 and the average family size was 2.88.

In the town, the population was spread out, with 24.7% under the age of 18, 7.0% from 18 to 24, 25.9% from 25 to 44, 24.6% from 45 to 64, and 17.9% who were 65 years of age or older. The median age was 38 years. For every 100 females, there were 91.8 males. For every 100 females age 18 and over, there were 82.2 males.

The median income for a household in the town was $24,597, and the median income for a family was $28,839. Males had a median income of $26,667 versus $20,096 for females. The per capita income for the town was $12,431. About 18.6% of families and 22.6% of the population were below the poverty line, including 31.7% of those under age 18 and 15.7% of those age 65 or over.

== Education ==
Schools in Cherokee are part of the Colbert County School System and serve rural western Colbert County. Cherokee Elementary School and Cherokee High School are located on the northern side of town along North Pike. The land for this complex, including the football field, was donated by the Harris family of Cherokee.

The population in western Colbert County has declined in recent years. Cherokee Middle School closed after the 2006 / 2007 year and was consolidated into Cherokee Elementary and Cherokee High Schools. The site was once home to one of the original Rosenwald Schools. The former middle school is now empty, while it is still owned by the Colbert County Board of Education.

== Transportation ==
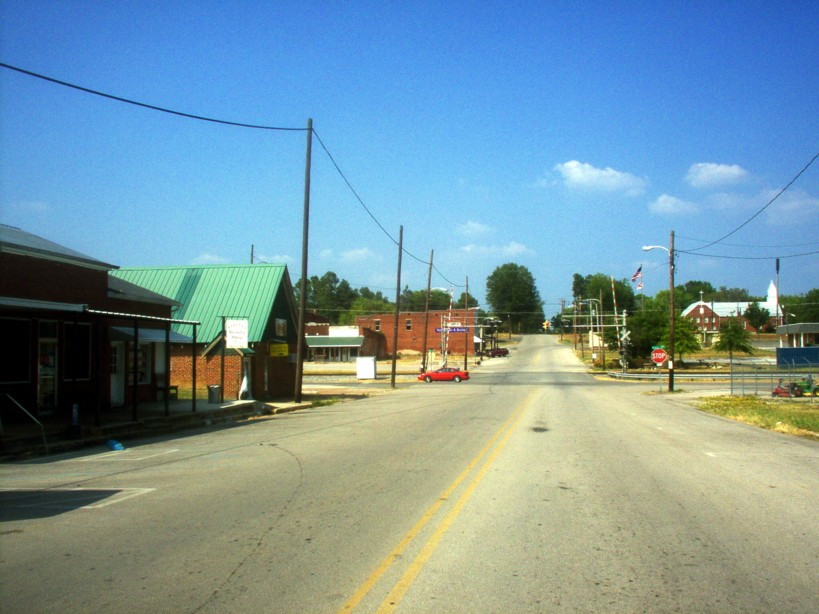
Downtown Cherokee, 2007

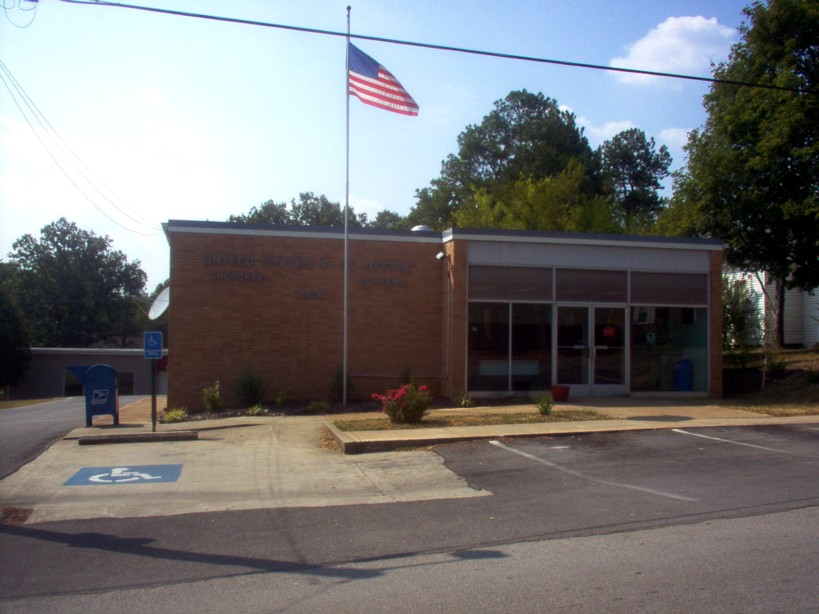
Cherokee Post Office, 2007

=== Major highways ===
==== U.S. Highway 72 ====
US Highway 72 is the major corridor through Cherokee. This important highway followed the railroad and was once known as the Memphis Pike. U.S. Highway 72 is still part of the Lee Highway.

==== Natchez Trace Parkway ====
The Natchez Trace Parkway passes north and west of Cherokee and is part of the National Park Service. This highway provides a vital source of tourism for the area.

=== Rail ===
The Memphis and Charleston Railroad was vital to the founding of present-day Cherokee. Once a vital passenger carrier for the area, the railroad is an important artery for the Norfolk Southern Railway system, connecting Chattanooga and Memphis. The railroad has a spur to Cherokee Nitrogen to transport ammonia and ammonium nitrate manufactured by the facility.

=== River ===
The Tennessee River was a critical transportation corridor for the South during the American Civil War. The river provides recreation, continues to transport goods, and is an important factor in industrial activity in the area.

=== Air ===
Northwest Alabama Regional Airport is located 23 miles (37 km) east of Cherokee. It is served by Delta Connection - Mesaba Airlines, providing public transportation to Atlanta.

== Economy ==
=== Barton Riverfront Industrial Park ===
The Barton Riverfront Industrial Park is located in the Barton community east of Cherokee near the Tennessee River. The park was constructed to attract industry to western Colbert County and has become an important economical revitalization to the area. The first company to locate in the park was SCA Tissue North America which started operation in 2004.

=== Major employers ===
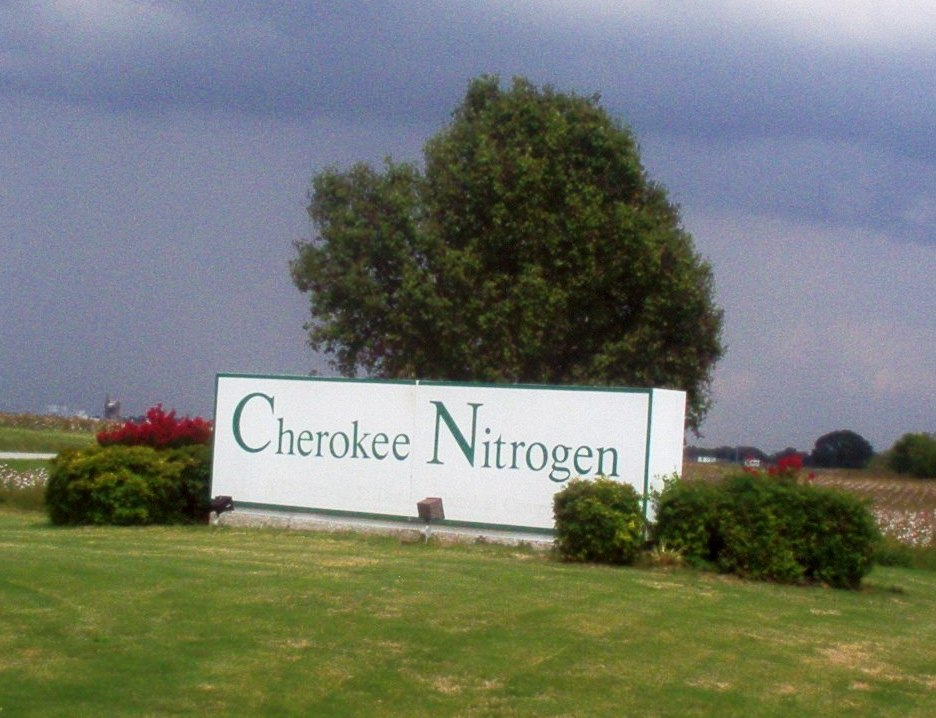
Entrance to Cherokee Nitrogen

==== Cherokee Nitrogen ====
Cherokee Nitrogen, owned by LSB Industries, is located on the north side of town. It was built in 1962 by Armour Agri-Chemicals and has been owned by USS Agri-Chemicals (a division of United States Steel) and LaRoche Industries before being bought by LSB Industries. Cherokee Nitrogen provides nitrogen products, ammonia, and ammonium nitrate.

Nelson Brothers is located adjacent to the facility. Nelson Brothers uses the ammonium nitrate in the production of dynamite.

Linde sells Carbon Dioxide produced as a byproduct of the process at Cherokee Nitrogen.

On the night of November 13, 2012, Cherokee Nitrogen was the scene of a devastating explosion heard 45 miles (72 km) away that left at least one employee injured. It was felt all across the "Shoals".

==== SCA Tissue North America ====
SCA Tissue North America, a division of Svenska Cellulosa Aktiebolaget, was the first tenant of the Barton Riverfront Industrial Park located east of town in the Barton community. As of 2010 it has undergone several expansions and is Cherokee's largest employer.

==== Vulcan Materials ====
Vulcan Materials' Cherokee Facility has been located on the east edge of town for many years. Crushed limestone from this quarry is used throughout Alabama and Mississippi.

==== UCM Magnesia ====
UCM Magnesia was an industry located in the Barton area. Originally Muscle Shoals ElectroChemical Corp, it was also owned by Glasrock and later Muscle Shoals Minerals. This facility was an important supplier of high quality magnesia powder. It closed in late 2012.

==== National Alabama ====
In July 2007 National Steel Car announced a decision to locate a new manufacturing facility in the industrial park, the largest new employer in Colbert County in the prior 40 years. The CEO, Gregory Aziz, was caught up in a legal case over securities fraud related to the facility and the facility was turned over to Retirement Systems of Alabama.

The facility has become an independent entity of its former parent and is now named National Alabama Corporation. Retirement Systems of Alabama is the primary shareholder.

National Alabama was designed to provide steel railcars and was expected to be the largest employer in the area. In 2010 the depressed economy was blamed for delayed full production at the facility and the company said it was looking for alternative products to produce. It would eventually close operations, and the building would be vacant for several years until March 2026 when Hadrian would re-open it for defense production.

==== Hadrian ====
In March 2026, Hadrian (a California-based firm) re-opened the former railcar facility to build components of Columbia- and Virginia- class submarines.

== Local attractions ==
=== Natchez Trace Parkway ===
The Natchez Trace Parkway is one of the most significant historical attractions in the area. The section of the Natchez Trace near Cherokee includes the Colbert Ferry site, the home of George Colbert and of Levi Colbert. The Colbert family were leaders of the Chickasaw Nation that resided in this area before they were forcibly relocated in the 19th century.

=== Key Underwood Coon Dog Memorial Graveyard ===
Key Underwood Coon Dog Memorial Graveyard is one of the world's most unusual cemeteries; it is dedicated to the burial of coon dogs. Each Labor Day a large celebration is held at the graveyard and is attended by many politicians seeking office.

=== Stanfield-Worley Bluff Shelter ===
Stanfield-Worley Bluff Shelter, located near Cherokee, is a significant find of early human life in North America.

=== Barton Hall ===
Barton Hall is located southwest of town and was a significant plantation prior to and during the Civil War. The residence is on the National Register of Historic Places but is privately owned and not open to the public.

=== Bear Creek Watershed ===
Buzzard Roost and Bear Creek, located west of Cherokee, provide excellent locations for fishing and water sports. One of the state's oldest wooden covered bridges once crossed Buzzard Roost but was burned in 1972.

=== Riverton Rose Trail ===
Riverton Rose Trail winds along Bear Creek from U.S. 72 to Riverton, Alabama. Before the Tennessee Valley Authority closed the gates on Pickwick Dam this town was an important transportation location on the Tennessee River as it marked the beginning of the treacherous shoals that hampered transportation in the Shoals Area until the opening of Riverton Lock in 1911. Today most of the town is flooded by the waters of Pickwick Lake on the Tennessee River.

=== Colbert Ferry ===
Colbert Ferry is located by the Tennessee River on the Natchez Trace Parkway. It was the home of George Colbert who ran a ferry to carry passengers traveling the Natchez Trace across the Tennessee River. The memorial park named for Chief George Colbert offers a large picnic area for families, a well maintained boat launch and dock, 24/7 restrooms, and fishing areas along the shoreline of the Tennessee River and Colbert Creek. The Boat Launch gives access to some of the more popular fishing areas long the Tennessee River's Pickwick Lake Impoundment. The park sees many visitors but locally, nationally, and the occasional international traveler.

== Notable people ==
- Dominique Croom, NFL wide receiver
- Bobby E. Denton, member of the Alabama Senate, representing the 1st District since 1978
