= Johnson's Woods =

Historic house in Alabama, United States

- U.S. National Register of Historic Places
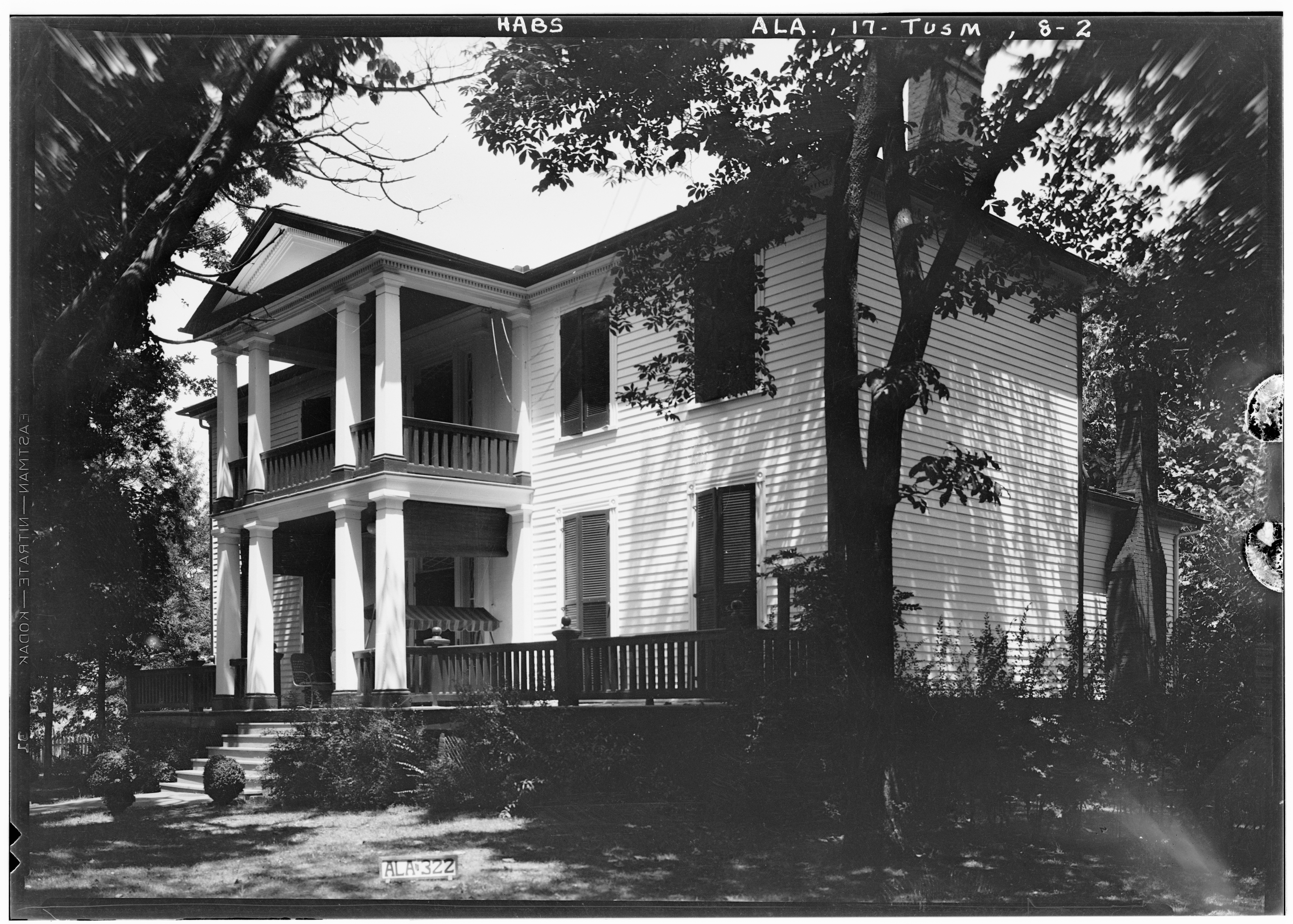
- The house in a 1933 HABS photo

- Location within Alabama Location within the United States
- Location: 801 E. North Commons, Tuscumbia, Alabama
- Coordinates: 34°44′26″N 87°41′35″W
- Area: 8.8 acres (3.6 ha)
- Built: 1837
- Architectural style: Classical Revival
- NRHP reference No.: 88000511
- Added to NRHP: May 4, 1988

Johnson's Woods (also known as the G. W. Carroll House) is a historic plantation house in Tuscumbia, Alabama, United States. The house was built in 1837 on land purchased by George W. Carroll in 1828. A settler from Maryland, Carroll became the county's wealthiest planter by 1850. Between 1855 and 1860, he moved to Arkansas, selling his plantation to William Mhoon. Upon Mhoon's death in 1869, the plantation passed to William A. Johnson, a former Tennessee River steamboat operator and Confederate Army soldier. In addition to farming, Johnson also revived his steamboat business, traded cotton in Memphis, and opened a mercantile business in Tuscumbia. After his death in 1891 and his wife's in 1905, the land passed to his son, John W. Johnson.

The Neoclassical house is L-shaped, and has a five-bay front façade. The double-height entry portico is supported by four narrow columns, with pilasters from the original, two-tiered portico which was removed in 1983. The portico is flanked by two sash windows on either side, two-over-two on the first floor and twelve-over-eight on the second. The double-paned door is surround by sidelights and a transom with diamond-shaped panes. The entry hall contains a staircase, and is flanked by a living room on one side and a dining room on the other. A side entry hall behind the dining room leads to the kitchen. A parlor was added behind the living room circa 1889, and a gabled room was added behind the kitchen circa 1904. Contributing outbuildings and structures include a smokehouse, plantation office, cotton shed, barn, corn crib, carriage house, commissary, animal shelter, and the cedar-lined entrance lane to the property.

The house was listed on the National Register of Historic Places in 1988.
