= Rock Creek Archeological District =

Archaeological site in Alabama, United States

- Rock Creek Archeological District (ACt44, ACt45)
- U.S. National Register of Historic Places
- Nearest city: Maud, Alabama
- Area: 40 acres (16 ha)
- NRHP reference No.: 88003068
- Added to NRHP: June 26, 1990

The Rock Creek Archeological District is a pair of archaeological sites near Maud, Colbert County, Alabama, United States. The sites contain remnants from the Archaic, Gulf Formational, Woodland, and Mississippian Periods. One of the sites, ACt 44, shows evidence of two major habitations, a hunting camp from the Late Archaic period (4000–2000 BCE) and a Late Mississippian farm village (1400–1600 CE), although ceramics and arrowheads from other eras have also been recovered. Most artifacts from the other site, ACt 45, date from the Gulf Formational period (1200–400 BCE). The sites were discovered by National Park Service archaeologist A. Wayne Prokopetz in 1975, with major surveys being completed by Christopher E. Hamilton in 1977 and by Memphis State University researchers in 1980. The district was listed on the National Register of Historic Places in 1990.
