= Tuscumbia Landing Site =

- U.S. National Register of Historic Places
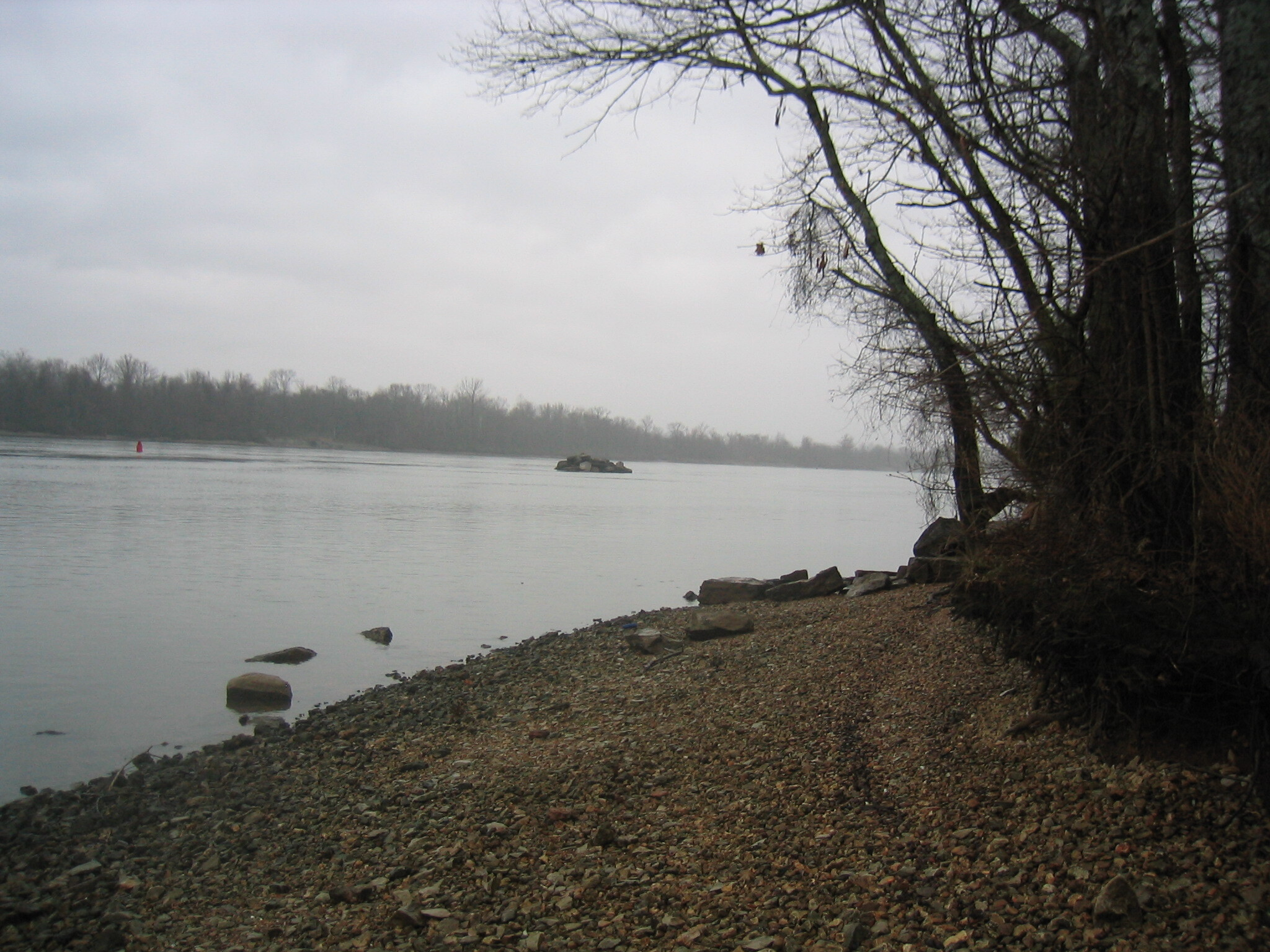
- Tuscumbia Landing Site in 2006

- Location within Alabama Location within the United States
- Nearest city: Sheffield, Alabama
- Coordinates: 34°44′56″N 87°43′31″W
- Area: 7 acres (2.8 ha)
- Built: 1824
- NRHP reference No.: 82002002
- Added to NRHP: June 10, 1982

The Tuscumbia Landing Site is a historic port site in Sheffield, Alabama, United States. The landing was established in 1824 at the mouth of Spring Creek on the Tennessee River. As large craft could not navigate Spring Creek to reach Tuscumbia, the landing was built to transfer goods to and from the town. The New Orleans and Tuscumbia Steamboat Company was created in 1825, and connected The Shoals with towns on the Mississippi and Ohio Rivers. Wagons were used to haul goods between the landing and the town until a horse-drawn railroad, the first railroad west of the Appalachian Mountains, was built from 1831 to 1832. The line was later extended to Decatur in 1834, bypassing the treacherous shoals on the Tennessee River, and was renamed the Tuscumbia, Courtland and Decatur Railroad. The landing was also a stop for many Muscogee and Cherokee along the Trail of Tears.

During the Civil War, the landing was heavily damaged in April 1862 by Colonel John Basil Turchin's troops; it was completely destroyed by General Grenville M. Dodge in April 1863, in the lead-up to Streight's Raid. Following the war, Florence became the port of choice in the Shoals, as the warehouses at Tuscumbia were never rebuilt. The site contains six limestone foundations of the main depot along the river, as well as foundation walls of a terminal at the top of a bluff and the remnants of a wagon road. The depot was built in 1832, and was three stories tall. A floating wharf was connected to the uppermost floor of the building, while the two lower floors were used for storage.

The site was listed on the National Register of Historic Places in 1982.
