= Tuscumbia Historic District =

Historic district in Alabama, United States

- U.S. National Register of Historic Places
- U.S. Historic district
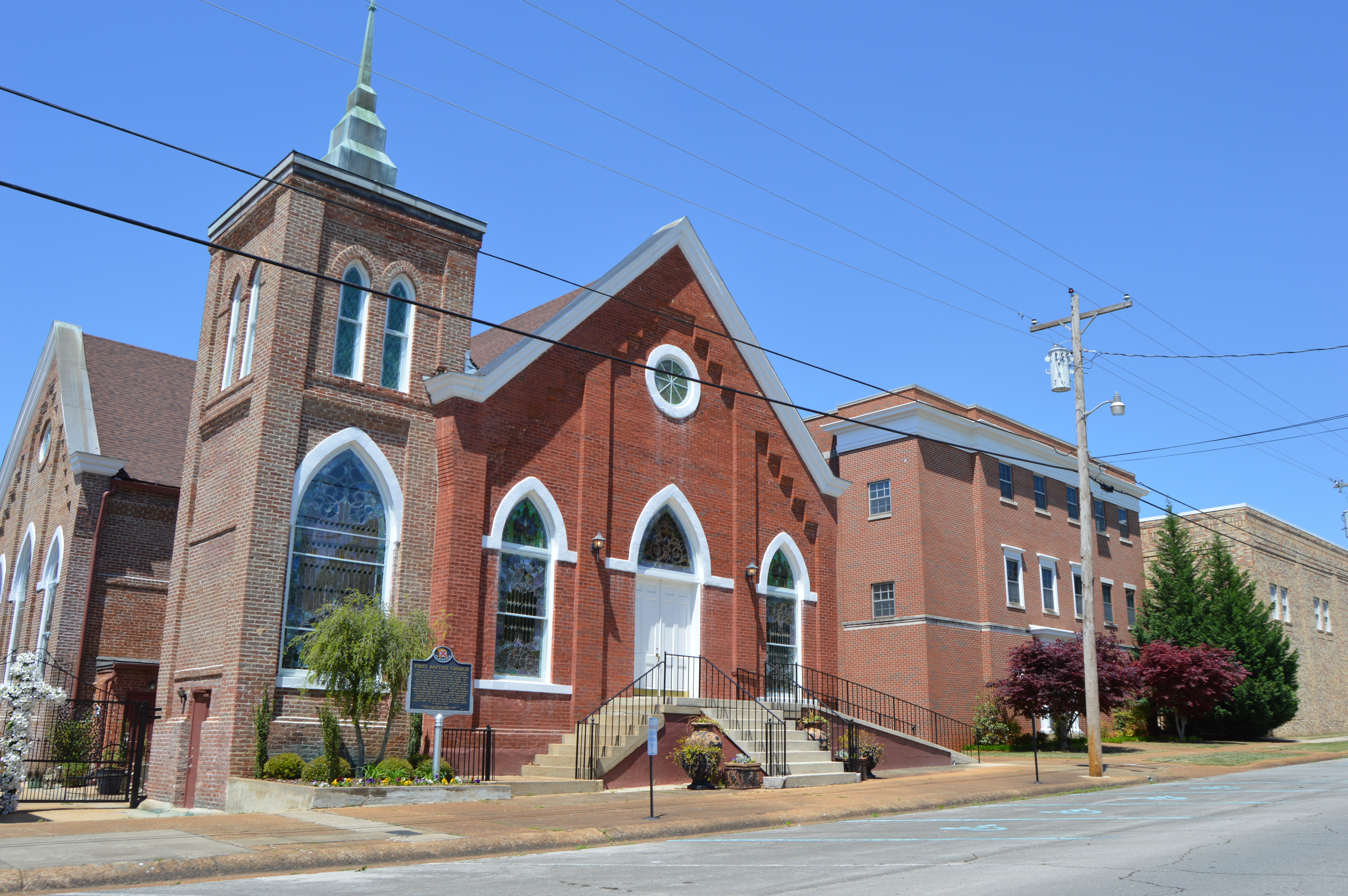
- The First Baptist Church in April 2014

- Location within Alabama Location within the United States
- Location: Roughly bounded by N. & E. Commons, Eight St. and Spring Rd., Hooks, W. 5th & S. Milton including Steel Bridge, Tuscumbia, Alabama
- Coordinates: 34°43′59″N 87°41′57″W
- Area: 232 acres (94 ha)
- NRHP reference No.: 85001158
- Added to NRHP: May 23, 1985

The Tuscumbia Historic District is a historic district in Tuscumbia, Alabama, United States. The district contains 461 contributing properties and covers about 232 acres (94 ha) of the town's original area. The first white settlers in Tuscumbia built a village next to Big Spring, at the site of what is today Spring Park. Many settlers, many from Virginia and Maryland, began to emigrate to The Shoals in the 1820s and 1830s. The oldest houses in the district are Tidewater-type cottages, a style native to the Middle Atlantic. Also built during the town's early period are some of the oldest commercial buildings in Alabama, including the Morgan-Donilan Building (built 1825) and a seven-building block known as Commercial Row (built in the mid-1830s). The town's economy declined in the 1840s, when many farmers left seeking more fertile soil, through the Civil War and Reconstruction.

Recovery came in the 1880s and 1890s, driven by industrial development in neighboring Sheffield. The majority of commercial buildings date from the 1880s through the 1930s, while residential buildings of the period display styles such as Queen Anne, Folk Victorian, Bungalow, and Tudor Revival. Other notable buildings in the district include the Colbert County Courthouse, built in 1909; St. John's Episcopal Church, built in 1852 as one of the earliest Carpenter Gothic churches in Alabama; and Deshler Stadium, a Works Projects Administration project completed in 1941.

The district was listed on the National Register of Historic Places in 1985.
