= Barton Hall (Alabama) =

Historic house in Alabama, United States

- U.S. National Register of Historic Places
- U.S. National Historic Landmark
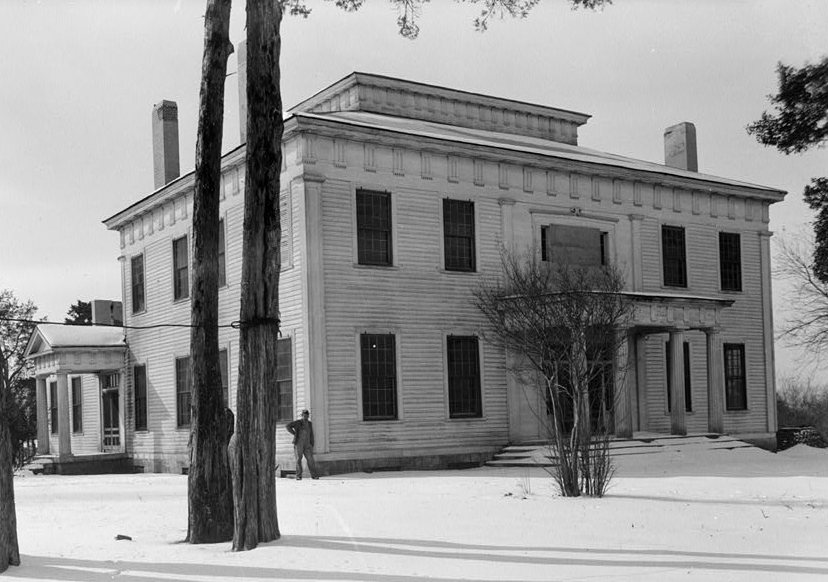
- HABS photo of Barton Hall, taken in 1935.

- Location within Alabama Location within the United States
- Location: west of Cherokee, Alabama
- Coordinates: 34°45′8.98″N 88°0′12.02″W
- Area: 4 acres (1.6 ha)
- Built: 1840
- Architectural style: Greek Revival
- NRHP reference No.: 73000337

Significant dates
- Added to NRHP: November 7, 1973
- Designated NHL: November 7, 1973

Barton Hall, also known as the Cunningham Plantation, is an antebellum plantation house near present-day Cherokee, Alabama, United States. Built in 1840, it is a stylistically rare example of Greek Revival architecture in Alabama, with elements from the late Federal period. The house was designated a National Historic Landmark in 1973 for its architecture.

== Description and history ==
Barton Hall is located in a rural setting about 4.0 miles (6.4 km) west of the town of Cherokee and 0.5 miles (0.80 km) south of United States Route 72. It is set on 4 acres (1.6 ha) of land, accessed via an elliptical drive from Cedar Lane. The house is a 2 1/2-story wood-frame structure, with a clapboarded exterior, and a truncated hip roof topped by a belvedere. Single-story gable-roofed wings extend to the rear. The main facade is five bays wide, with a symmetrical arrangement of windows around the central entrance. The central bay is set off from the others by fluted pilasters, which also appear at the building corners. The entrance is sheltered by a deep porch supported by fluted Doric columns, and featuring Doric triglyphs in its cornice. The porch is topped by a balcony accessed via a second-story entrance stylistically similar to the main entrance below. The entrance is flanked by sidelight windows and topped by a transom window and eared architrave.

Period interior features include a unique stairway which ascends in a series of double flights and bridge-like landings to an observatory on the rooftop that offered views of the plantation.

In 1840, Armestead Barton, a native of Tennessee, moved to the area and purchased 40,000 acres (16,000 ha), on which he began construction of this house. The house remained unfinished at the time of his death in 1847 and was completed two years later under his widow's supervision. The property was sold out of the Barton family in 1908. In 1967, a Barton descendant repurchased the house.

In November 2008, the noted photographer Charles Moore took his final documented images on this property. The home continues to be privately owned and occupied, and it is not open to the public.

== Gallery ==
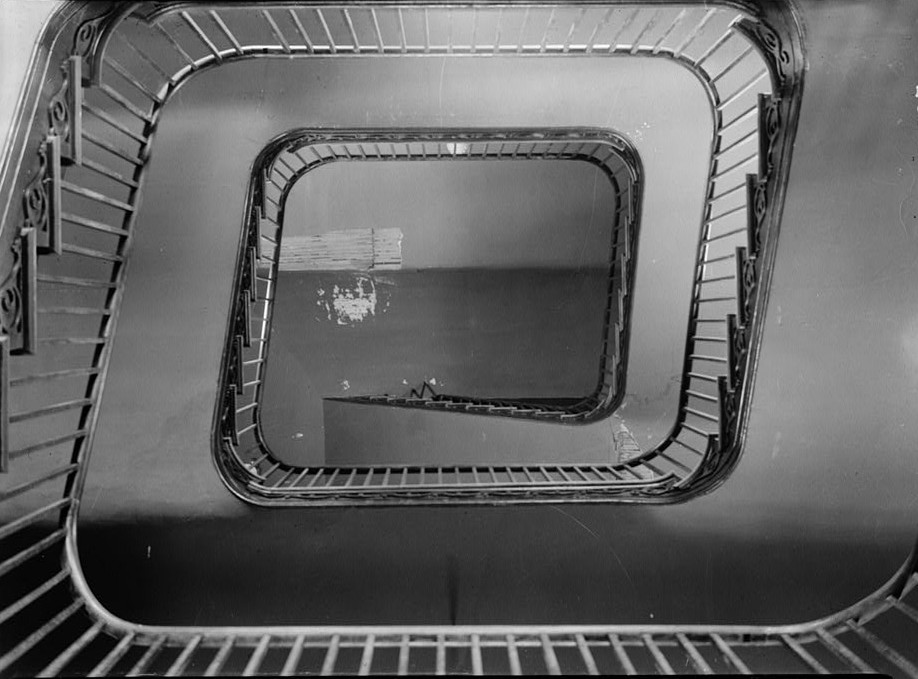
View of the stairwell, up to the observatory.

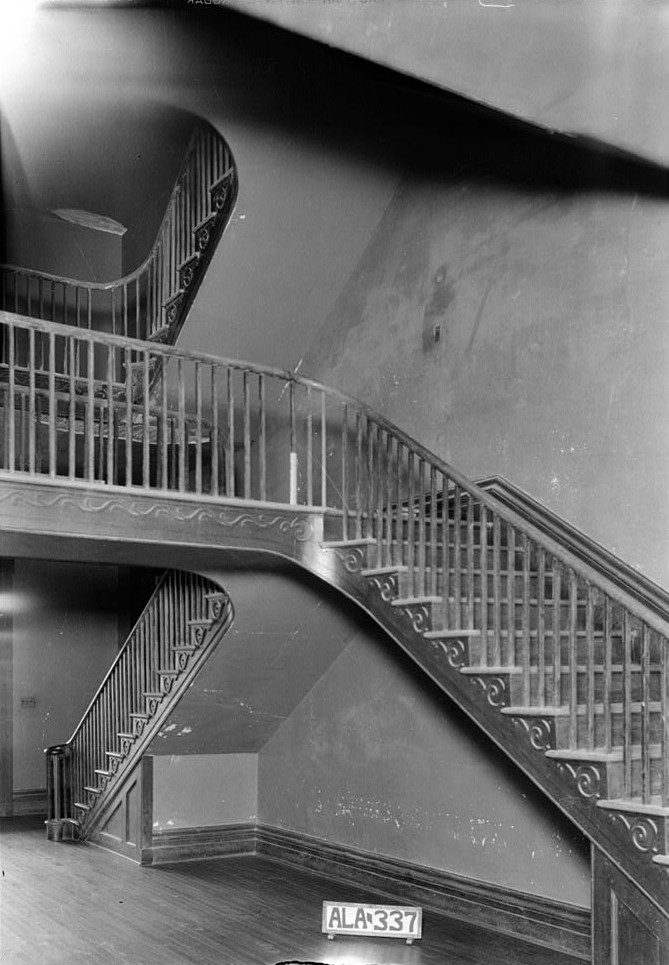
Stair treatment on the west side of the main hall.

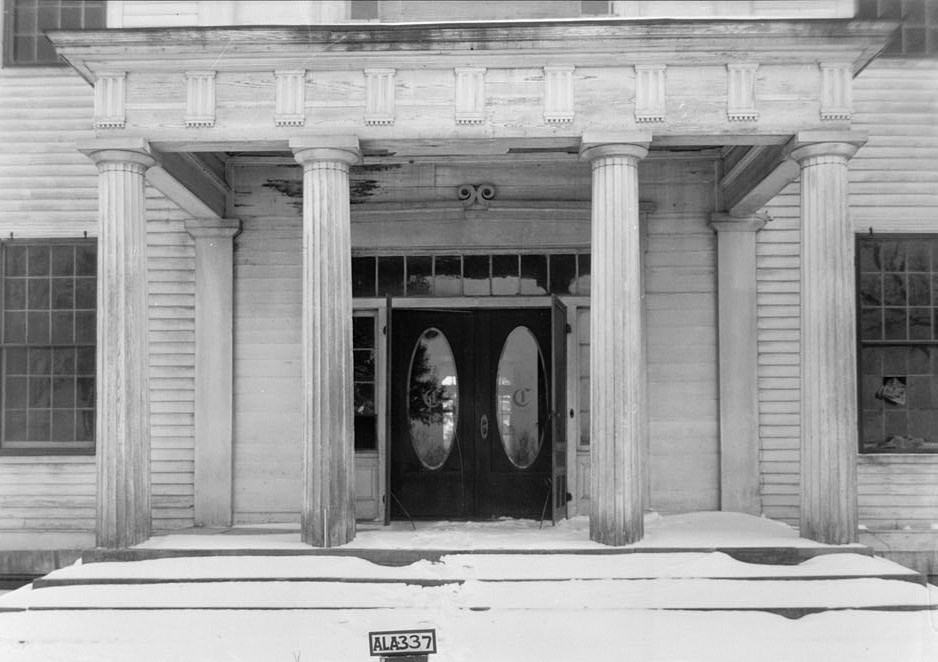
The front entrance porch.

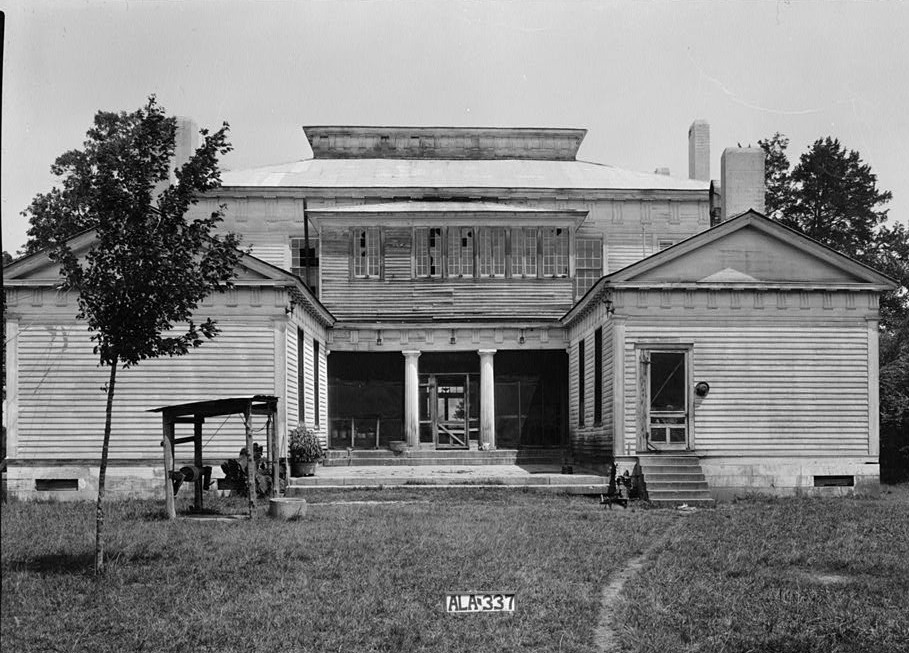
View of the rear courtyard.

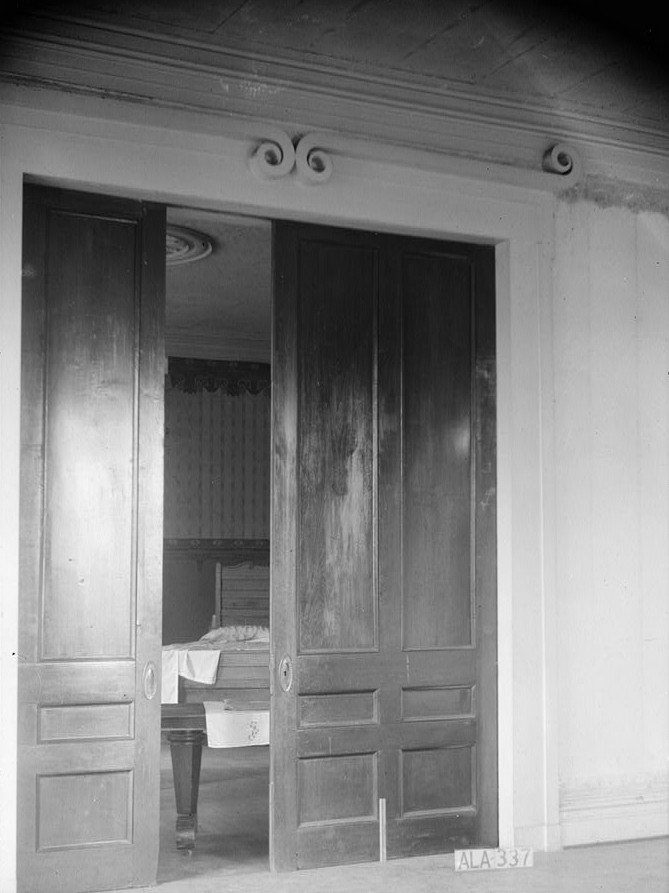
Pocket doors between the parlors.

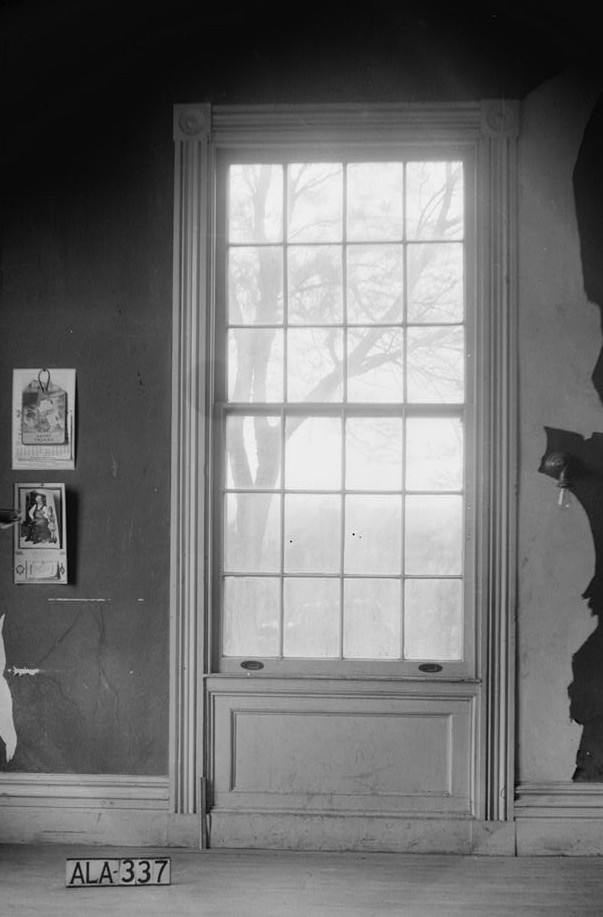
Window treatment in living room.

== See also ==
- List of National Historic Landmarks in Alabama
- National Register of Historic Places listings in Colbert County, Alabama
