= List of third-party and independent performances in United States House elections =

This is a list of notable performances of third-party and independent candidates in elections to the United States House of Representatives.

It is rare for candidates, other than those of the six parties which have succeeded as major parties (Federalist Party, Democratic-Republican Party, National Republican Party, Democratic Party, Whig Party, Republican Party), to take large shares of the vote in elections.

In some of the listed cases a faction or factions of a state's major party ran against each other, often making it difficult to ascertain which was the mainline candidate and which was the bolter; in such cases, those candidates which are not listed on a standard major party line are still listed, but are not considered traditional third-party victories as often these candidates sat in Congress as affiliated party members (barring cases like Joe Lieberman who, upon winning re-election in 2006 as a third-party candidate, sat as an Independent Democrat).

Listed below are House elections in which a third-party or independent candidate won at least 5.0% of the vote. Winners are shown in bold and marked "elected" or "re-elected". To be included a candidate must not run on one of the major parties tickets along with being on the minor party. In other words, they must solely be a minor party candidate.

== 1828–1829 ==
Notable third-party House performances (1828–1829) – 67 entries - 5 victories
Year	District	Party	Candidate	# Votes	% Votes	Place
1828	Alabama Middle	Independent (Note: Affiliation is actually not known.)	Seth Barron	3,346	27.49 / 100	2nd
1828	Alabama Southern	Independent	Samuel W. Oliver	3,354	31.28 / 100	2nd
1828	Alabama Southern	Independent	Francis Armstrong	2,929	27.32 / 100	3rd
1828	Kentucky 3rd	Independent	Matthews Flournoy	1,045	28.63 / 100	2nd
1828	Kentucky 6th	Independent	Thomas P. Wilson	3,222	45.43 / 100	2nd
1828	Kentucky 7th	Independent	William B. Booker	2,872	43.74 / 100	2nd
1828	Maine 1	Independent	Simon Nowall	337	7.46 / 100	2nd
1828	Maine 1	Independent	Nathaniel Appleton	319	7.07 / 100	3rd
1828	Maine 1	Independent	Samuel A. Bradley	260	5.76 / 100	4th
1828	Maine 2	Independent	John Adams	847	20.22 / 100	2nd
1828	Maine 6 - First Trial	Independent	Joshua Hall	358	10.06 / 100	3rd
1828	Maine 6 - First Trial	Independent	Samuel Upton	321	9.02 / 100	4th
1828	Maine 6 - Second Trial	Independent	Samuel Upton	627	22.83 / 100	3rd
1828	Maine 7	Independent	William Emerson	1,564	29.06 / 100	2nd
1828	Massachusetts 2	Independent	Ezra Mudge	284	11.7 / 100	3rd
1828	Massachusetts 3	Independent	Samuel Phillips	149	6.55 / 100	3rd
1828	Massachusetts 8	Independent	Jonas Sibley	184	6.83 / 100	2nd
1828	New York 7	Anti-Masonic	John Bogardus	731	10.76 / 100	3rd
1828	New York 24	Anti-Masonic	Moses Dixon	901	13.55 / 100	3rd
1828	New York 26	Anti-Masonic	Robert S. Rose	8,444	26.43 / 100	**Elected**
1828	New York 26	Anti-Masonic	Israel J. Richardson	4,886	15.29 / 100	5th
1828	New York 27	Anti-Masonic	Timothy Childs	6,520	54.61 / 100	**Elected**
1828	New York 29	Anti-Masonic	Phineas L. Tracy	6,924	54.61 / 100	**Re-elected as Anti-Masonic**
1828	New York 30	Anti-Masonic	Ebenezer F. Norton	5,226	45.02 / 100	**Elected**
1828	New York 30	Anti-Masonic	Daniel G. Garnsey	1,560	13.44 / 100	Lost re-election as Anti-Masonic; 4th
1828	Ohio's 12	Independent	George M. Cook	779	9.08 / 100	3rd
1828	Ohio's 13	Independent	Eli Baldwin	1,405	18.87 / 100	2nd
1828	Pennsylvania 13	Independent	William Piper	2,722	48.13 / 100	2nd
1828	South Carolina 6	Independent	Cobb	755	23.88 / 100	2nd
1828	Vermont 5 - First Trial	Anti-Masonic	William Cahoon	1,671	24.59 / 100	3rd
1828	Vermont 5 - Second Trial	Anti-Masonic	William Cahoon	1,366	19.55 / 100	3rd
1829	Maine 4 (special) – first trial	Independent	Reuel Williams	1,857	41.04 / 100	**Elected**
1829	Maine 4 (special) – first trial	Independent	Jesse Robinson	674	14.9 / 100	3rd
1829	Maine 4 (special) – second trial	Independent	Reuel Williams	2,238	45.4 / 100	2nd
1829	Maine 6 - Third Trial	Independent	John G. Deane	909	20.11 / 100	2nd
1829	Maine 6 - Third Trial	Independent	Samuel Upton	751	16.62 / 100	4th
1829	Maine 6 - Fourth Trial	Independent	John G. Deane	1,408	27.62 / 100	2nd
1829	Maine 6 - Fourth Trial	Independent	Samuel Upton	872	17.11 / 100	4th
1829	Maine 6 - Fifth Trial	Independent	John G. Deane	889	31.93 / 100	2nd
1829	Maine 6 - Fifth Trial	Independent	Samuel Upton	544	19.54 / 100	3rd
1829	Maine 6 - Fifth Trial	Independent	Samuel Williamson	412	14.8 / 100	4th
1829	North Carolina 2	Independent	George E. Spruill	103	6.11 / 100	2nd
1829	Pennsylvania 16 (special)	Anti-Masonic	Harmar Denny	4,208	57.66 / 100	**Elected**
1829	Tennessee 1	Independent	John A. Rogers	1,195	16.47 / 100	2nd
1829	Tennessee 1	Independent	William Priestly	1,179	16.24 / 100	3rd
1829	Tennessee 2	Independent	Thomas Dickens Arnold	4,496	48.82 / 100	2nd
1829	Tennessee 3	Independent	John Lowry	1,802	17.69 / 100	2nd
1829	Tennessee 5	Independent	William Trousdale	2,547	35.76 / 100	2nd
1829	Tennessee 8	Independent	John Hartwell Marable	3,085	47.06 / 100	Lost re-election 2nd
1829	Vermont 5 - Third Trial	Anti-Masonic	William Cahoon	1,213	18.37 / 100	3rd
1829	Vermont 5 - Fourth Trial	Anti-Masonic	William Cahoon	1,701	23.77 / 100	3rd
1829	Vermont 5 - Fifth Trial	Anti-Masonic	William Cahoon	2,050	30.71 / 100	2nd
1829	Vermont 5 - Sixth Trial	Anti-Masonic	William Cahoon	2,858	37.85 / 100	**Elected**
1829	Vermont 5 - Seventh Trial	Independent	Samuel Prentiss	3,834	48.63 / 100	**Elected**
1829	Vermont 5 - Seventh Trial	Anti-Masonic	William Cahoon	3,712	47.08 / 100	2nd
1829	Vermont 5 - Eighth Trial	Anti-Masonic	William Cahoon	3,912	57.9 / 100	**Elected**
1829	Virginia 5	Independent	George William Crump	468	42.05 / 100	2nd
1829	Virginia 8	Independent	Burwell Bassett	468	37.5 / 100	Lost re-election as an Independent; 2nd
1829	Virginia 8	Independent	Carter M. Braxton	323	20.81 / 100	3rd
1829	Virginia 10 (special)	Independent	Archibald Byrce	245	23.93 / 100	2nd
1829	Virginia 10 (special)	Independent	Hugh Nelson	184	17.97 / 100	3rd
1829	Virginia 13	Independent	Willoughby Newton	427	38.23 / 100	2nd
1829	Virginia 14	Independent	John Gibson	146	17.98 / 100	2nd
1829	Virginia 17	Independent	Samuel Kerceval	574	38.55 / 100	2nd
1829	Virginia 20	Independent	Fleming Bowyer Miller	1,189	44.99 / 100	2nd
1829	Virginia 21	Independent	Joseph Lowell	1,571	39.79 / 100	2nd
1829	Virginia 21	Independent	William Smith	799	20.24 / 100	3rd

== 1850–1851 ==
Notable third-party House performances (1850–1851) – 113 entries - 34 victories
Year	Date	State	District	Party	Candidate	# Votes	% Votes	Place
1850	January 21	Massachusetts	4th SeventhTrial	Free Soil	John G. Palfrey	4,947	35.88 / 100	2nd
1850	March 4	Massachusetts	4th Eighth Trial	Free Soil	John G. Palfrey	3,927	37.92 / 100	2nd
1850	May 27	Massachusetts	4th Ninth Trial	Free Soil	John G. Palfrey	4,970	47.57 / 100	**Elected**
1850	August 5	Missouri	1st	Benton Democrat (Note: Faction of the Democratic Party supportive of Senator Thomas Hart Benton and part of the Anti-Nebraska movement.)	Fermin A. Rosier	5,600	31.0 / 100	2nd
1850	August 5	Missouri	1st	Anti-Benton Democrat (Note: Faction of the Democratic Party opposed to Senator Thomas Hart Benton.)	James B. Bowlin	5,317	29.44 / 100	3rd
1850	August 5	Missouri	3rd	Anti-Benton Democrat	James S. Green	6,554	42.17 / 100	2nd
1850	August 5	Missouri	3rd	Benton Democrat	John G. Miller	2,411	15.51 / 100	3rd
1850	August 5	Missouri	4th	Anti-Benton Democrat	Willard Preble Hall	5,606	37.53 / 100	**Re-elected**
1850	August 5	Missouri	4th	Benton Democrat	James B. Gardenshire	3,826	25.61 / 100	3rd
1850	August 5	Missouri	5th	Benton Democrat	John S. Phelps	8,325	50.03 / 100	**Elected**
1850	August 5	Missouri	5th	Anti-Benton Democrat	William Shields	2,050	12.32 / 100	3rd
1850	August 19	Massachusetts	1st Special Election	Free Soil	Charles Sumner	473	15.14 / 100	2nd
1850	August 19	Massachusetts	2nd Special Election	Free Soil	John Pierpont	1,191	17.41 / 100	3rd
1850	August 19	Massachusetts	4th Tenth Trial	Free Soil	John G. Palfrey	3,010	42.56 / 100	**Elected**
1850	September 3	Vermont	1st	Free Soil Democratic	Merritt Clark	1,210	10.35 / 100	4th
1850	September 3	Vermont	3rd	Free Soil Democratic	Heman R. Beardsley	2,960	28.12 / 100	2nd
1850	September 3	Vermont	4th	Free Soil Democratic	Thomas Bartlett Jr.	7,009	55.35 / 100	**Elected**
1850	September 9	Maine	1st	Free Soil	M. Sweat	530	5.1 / 100	3rd
1850	September 9	Maine	3rd	Free Soil	Seth May	1,272	11.78 / 100	3rd
1850	September 9	Maine	7th	Free Soil	Stephen C. Foster	716	7.15 / 100	3rd
1850	September 9	Massachusetts	2nd Special Election; Second Trial	Free Soil	John Pierpont	1,446	15.64 / 100	3rd
1850	October 8	Ohio	16th	Independent Democrat	John Johnson	5,458	51.42 / 100	**Elected**
1850	October 8	Ohio	20th	Free Soil	Joshua Reed Giddings	6,896	77.75 / 100	**Re-elected**
1850	October 8	Ohio	21st	Free Soil	Joseph M. Root	1,120	7.98 / 100	3rd
1850	October 8	Pennsylvania	1st	American	Lewis Charles Levin	4,164	41.13 / 100	Lost re-election 2nd
1850	October 8	Pennsylvania	21st	American	Israel Cullen	539	5.14 / 100	3rd
1850	October 8	Pennsylvania	22nd	Free Soil; Supported by Whigs	John W. Howe	6,284	51.65 / 100	**Re-elected**
1850	November 5	New Jersey	1st	Native American	Joseph Franklin	1,084	8.1 / 100	3rd
1850	November 5	New York	3rd	Independent	John F. Rodman	2,164	28.48 / 100	2nd
1850	November 5	New York	4th	Independent Democrat	Dominick McGrath	541	6.35 / 100	3rd
1850	November 5	Wisconsin	1st	Free Soil; Supported by Whigs	Charles Durkee	7,512	57.4 / 100	**Re-elected**
1850	November 5	Wisconsin	3rd	Independent	James Duane Doty	11,159	67.51 / 100	**Re-elected**
1850	November 11	Massachusetts	1st	Free Soil	Benjamin B. Mufsey	1,167	13.17 / 100	3rd
1850	November 11	Massachusetts	2nd	Free Soil	Samuel E. Sewall	2,979	22.56 / 100	3rd
1850	November 11	Massachusetts	2nd Special Election; Third Trial	Free Soil	Samuel E. Sewall	2,984	21.72 / 100	3rd
1850	November 11	Massachusetts	3rd	Free Soil	Thomas W. Higginson	2,476	20.54 / 100	3rd
1850	November 11	Massachusetts	4th	Free Soil	John G. Palfrey	4,783	34.25 / 100	2nd
1850	November 11	Massachusetts	4th Eleventh Trial	Free Soil	John G. Palfrey	4,932	34.68 / 100	2nd
1850	November 11	Massachusetts	5th	Free Soil	Charles Allen	4,095	30.33 / 100	2nd
1850	November 11	Massachusetts	6th	Free Soil	Charles P. Huntington	2,101	15.0 / 100	3rd
1850	November 11	Massachusetts	7th	Free Soil	Joel Hayden	804	6.72 / 100	3rd
1850	November 11	Massachusetts	8th	Free Soil	Horace Mann	6,697	50.51 / 100	**Re-elected**
1850	November 11	Massachusetts	10th	Free Soil	Sampson Hart	1,054	17.92 / 100	3rd
1850	December 31	Pennsylvania	11th Special Election	Independent	Edmund L. Dana	3,283	47.52 / 100	2nd
1851	January 20	Massachusetts	2nd Second Trial	Free Soil	Samuel E. Sewall	1,630	18.97 / 100	3rd
1851	January 20	Massachusetts	2nd Special Election; Fourth Trial	Free Soil	Samuel E. Sewall	1,630	18.95 / 100	3rd
1851	January 20	Massachusetts	3rd Second Trial	Free Soil	Thomas W. Higginson	1,225	16.84 / 100	3rd
1851	January 20	Massachusetts	4th Second Trial	Free Soil	John G. Palfrey	2,986	33.85 / 100	2nd
1851	January 20	Massachusetts	4th Twelfth Trial	Free Soil	John G. Palfrey	3,001	34.09 / 100	2nd
1851	January 20	Massachusetts	5th Second Trial	Free Soil	Charles Allen	4,166	46.72 / 100	**Elected**
1851	January 20	Massachusetts	6th Second Trial	Free Soil	Samuel Williston	1,460	15.57 / 100	3rd
1851	January 20	Massachusetts	7th Second Trial	Free Soil	Joel Hayden	579	7.73 / 100	3rd
1851	January 20	Massachusetts	10th Second Trial	Free Soil	Sampson Hart	429	11.04 / 100	3rd
1851	January 20	Massachusetts	10th Second Trial	Unknown	Daniel Bishop	239	6.15 / 100	4th
1851	March 11	New Hampshire	1st	Free Soil; Supported by Whigs	Amos Tuck	7,791	51.23 / 100	**Re-elected**
1851	March 11	New Hampshire	2nd	Free Soil	Asa Fowler	2,060	15.18 / 100	3rd
1851	March 11	New Hampshire	4th	Free Soil	John H. White	1,118	13.02 / 100	3rd
1851	April 7	Massachusetts	2nd Third Trial	Free Soil	Samuel E. Sewall	1,773	19.01 / 100	3rd
1851	April 7	Massachusetts	4th Third Trial	Free Soil	John G. Palfrey	3,519	40.18 / 100	2nd
1851	April 7	Massachusetts	5th Third Trial	Free Soil	Charles Allen	4,166	51.11 / 100	**Elected**
1851	April 7	Massachusetts	7th Second Trial	Free Soil	Joel Hayden	586	7.96 / 100	3rd
1851	April 7	Massachusetts	4th Fourth Trial	Free Soil	John G. Palfrey	6,293	47.0 / 100	2nd
1851	August 4	Alabama	1st	Southern Rights	John Bragg	6,073	58.81 / 100	**Elected**
1851	August 4	Alabama	1st	Union	Charles C. Langdon	4,254	41.19 / 100	2nd
1851	August 4	Alabama	2nd	Union	James Abercrombie	7,598	56.24 / 100	**Elected**
1851	August 4	Alabama	2nd	Southern Rights	John Cochran	5,911	43.76 / 100	2nd
1851	August 4	Alabama	3rd	Southern Rights	Sampson Willis Harris	5,677	52.75 / 100	**Re-elected**
1851	August 4	Alabama	3rd	Union	William S. Mudd	5,085	47.25 / 100	2nd
1851	August 4	Alabama	4th	Union	William Russell Smith	4,164	50.3 / 100	**Elected**
1851	August 4	Alabama	4th	Southern Rights	John Erwin	4,114	49.7 / 100	2nd
1851	August 4	Alabama	5th	Union	George S. Houston	4,729	52.73 / 100	**Elected**
1851	August 4	Alabama	5th	Southern Rights	David Hubbard	4,240	47.27 / 100	2nd
1851	August 4	Alabama	6th	Union	Williamson Robert Winfield Cobb	3,708	73.99 / 100	**Re-elected**
1851	August 4	Alabama	6th	Southern Rights	Robert Murphy	1,303	26.0 / 100	2nd
1851	August 4	Alabama	7th	Union	Alexander White	5,744	51.68 / 100	**Elected**
1851	August 4	Alabama	7th	Southern Rights	Samuel F. Rice	5,371	48.32 / 100	2nd
1851	August 4	Indiana	4th	Free Soil	George Washington Julian	4,540	47.09 / 100	Lost re-election 2nd
1851	August 4	Kentucky	2nd	Independent Whig	Jeff Jennings	3,301	34.47 / 100	2nd
1851	August 4	Texas	1st	Unknown	B. Bush Wallace	1,148	8.49 / 100	3rd
1851	August 4	Texas	2nd	Unknown	Hugh McLeod	2,935	21.21 / 100	2nd
1851	August 4	Texas		Unknown	Henry N. Potter	1,231	8.89 / 100	4th
1851	August 6	Tennessee	6th	Independent Democrat	William Hawkins Polk	5,830	56.13 / 100	**Elected**
1851	August 14	North Carolina	2nd	Secessionist Whig	Thomas Lanier Clingman	6,600	70.07 / 100	**Re-elected as Secessionist Whig**
1851	August 14	North Carolina	5th	Secessionist Democrat	Abraham Watkins Venable	4,057	59.95 / 100	**Re-elected as Secessionist Democrat**
1851	August 14	North Carolina	5th	Unionist Democrat	Calvin Graves	2,710	40.05 / 100	2nd
1851	October 1	Maryland	1st	Independent Whig	Thomas Fielder Bowie	2,114	45.69 / 100	2nd
1851	October 1	Maryland	3rd	Independent	Andrew A. Lynch	2,894	34.75 / 100	2nd
1851	October 1	Maryland	6th	Independent Whig	Joseph Stewart Cottman	2,837	50.92 / 100	**Elected**
1851	October 6	Georgia	1st	Southern Rights	Joseph Webber Jackson	4,283	51.66 / 100	**Re-elected as Southern Rights**
1851	October 6	Georgia	1st	Union	Joseph Webber Jackson	4,007	48.84 / 100	2nd
1851	October 6	Georgia	2nd	Union	James Johnson	8,107	53.72 / 100	**Elected**
1851	October 6	Georgia	2nd	Southern Rights	Henry L. Benning	6,985	46.28 / 100	2nd
1851	October 6	Georgia	3rd	Southern Rights	David Jackson Bailey	6,011	50.67 / 100	**Elected**
1851	October 6	Georgia	3rd	Union	Absalom Harris Chappell	5,853	49.33 / 100	2nd
1851	October 6	Georgia	4th	Union	Charles Murphey	7,750	58.05 / 100	**Elected**
1851	October 6	Georgia	4th	Southern Rights	John P. Stell	5,601	41.95 / 100	2nd
1851	October 6	Georgia	5th	Union	Elijah Webb Chastain	13,882	64.98 / 100	**Elected**
1851	October 6	Georgia	5th	Southern Rights	William Henry Stiles	7,481	35.02 / 100	2nd
1851	October 6	Georgia	6th	Union	Junius Hillyer	6,937	71.1 / 100	**Elected**
1851	October 6	Georgia	6th	Southern Rights	Thomas F. Jones	2,819	28.9 / 100	2nd
1851	October 6	Georgia	7th	Union	Alexander H. Stephens	4,744	70.82 / 100	**Re-elected as Unionist**
1851	October 6	Georgia	7th	Southern Rights	David W. Lewis	1,955	29.18 / 100	2nd
1851	October 6	Georgia	8th	Union	Robert Toombs	4,704	64.95 / 100	**Re-elected as Unionist**
1851	October 6	Georgia	8th	Southern Rights	Robert McMillan	2,538	35.05 / 100	2nd
1851	October 23	Virginia	8th	Unknown	Robert W. Carter	29	38.67 / 100	2nd
1851	November 4	Mississippi	1st	Union	Benjamin D. Nabers	9,659	57.77 / 100	**Elected**
1851	November 4	Mississippi	1st	Southern Rights	Jacob Thompson	7,051	42.23 / 100	Lost re-election as Southern Rights; 2nd
1851	November 4	Mississippi	2nd	Union	John Allen Wilcox	6,927	52.77 / 100	**Elected**
1851	November 4	Mississippi	2nd	Southern Rights	Winfield S. Featherston	6,201	47.23 / 100	Lost re-election as Southern Rights; 2nd
1851	November 4	Mississippi	3rd	Union	John D. Freeman	7,732	51.15 / 100	**Elected**
1851	November 4	Mississippi	3rd	Southern Rights	William McWillie	7,485	48.85 / 100	Lost re-election as Southern Rights; 2nd
1851	November 4	Mississippi	4th	Southern Rights	Albert G. Brown	7,304	57.34 / 100	**Re-elected as Southern Rights**
1851	November 4	Mississippi	4th	Union	A. B. Dawson	5,433	42.66 / 100	2nd

== 1852–1853 ==
Notable third-party House performances (1852–1853) – 113 entries - 13 victories
Year	Date	State	District	Party	Candidate	# Votes	% Votes	Place
1852	August 2	Missouri	1st	Benton Democrat	Thomas Hart Benton	8,437	45.37 / 100	**Elected**
1852	August 2	Missouri	1st	Anti-Benton Democrat	Lewis V. Bogy	2,566	13.8 / 100	3rd
1852	August 2	Missouri	4th	Anti-Benton Democrat	James H. Birch	4,452	27.3 / 100	2nd
1852	August 2	Missouri	4th	Benton Democrat	Austin Augustus King	4,243	26.02 / 100	3rd
1852	September 7	Vermont	1st	Free Soil Democratic	John Pierpont	2,822	22.25 / 100	2nd
1852	September 7	Vermont	2nd	Old Democrat	Daniel Kellogg	3,196	18.73 / 100	2nd
1852	September 7	Vermont	2nd	Free Soil Democratic	Ryland Fletcher	2,863	16.78 / 100	3rd
1852	September 7	Vermont	3rd	Free Soil Democratic	A. Judson Rowell	2,989	24.4 / 100	3rd
1852	September 13	Maine	1st	Free Soil	Samuel Fessenden	1,358	8.54 / 100	3rd
1852	September 13	Maine	4th	Free Soil	Seth May	1,580	9.87 / 100	3rd
1852	October 12	Indiana	5th	Unknown	R. J. Hubbard	1,451	9.81 / 100	3rd
1852	October 12	Ohio	7th	Free Soil	Oliver W. Nixon	1,252	9.04 / 100	3rd
1852	October 12	Ohio	9th	Free Soil	George W. Sampson	768	6.94 / 100	3rd
1852	October 12	Ohio	13th	Free Soil	Jacob Brinkerhoff	2,390	15.76 / 100	3rd
1852	October 12	Ohio	14th	Free Soil	Norton Strange Townshend	3,030	19.7 / 100	3rd
1852	October 12	Ohio	15th	Free Soil	R. H. Vance	924	5.84 / 100	3rd
1852	October 12	Ohio	18th	Free Soil	Thomas Earl	1,708	12.56 / 100	3rd
1852	October 12	Ohio	19th	Free Soil	Edward Wade	5,274	40.46 / 100	**Elected**
1852	October 12	Ohio	20th	Free Soil	Joshua Reed Giddings	5,752	40.06 / 100	**Re-elected**
1852	October 12	Ohio	21st	Free Soil	Thomas S. Lee	1,220	7.86 / 100	3rd
1852	October 12	Pennsylvania	1st	American	Lewis Charles Levin	2,953	26.63 / 100	3rd
1852	October 12	Pennsylvania	3rd	American	John S. Painter	2,206	19.41 / 100	3rd
1852	October 12	Pennsylvania	4th	American	Oliver P. Cornman	2,063	16.43 / 100	3rd
1852	October 12	Pennsylvania	14th	Free Soil	George Horton	495	5.78 / 100	2nd
1852	October 12	Pennsylvania	21st	Free Soil	Neville B. Craig	641	6.15 / 100	3rd
1852	October 12	Pennsylvania	23rd	Free Soil	Joseph C. White	1,017	8.67 / 100	3rd
1852	October 12	Pennsylvania	25th	Free Soil	David A. Gould	940	8.55 / 100	3rd
1852	November 2	Illinois	1st	Free Soil	Newman Campbell	2,245	13.41 / 100	3rd
1852	November 2	Illinois	2nd	Free Soil	James H. Collins	2,149	13.33 / 100	3rd
1852	November 2	Illinois	3rd	Free Soil	John Howard Bryant	1,603	8.92 / 100	3rd
1852	November 2	Illinois	4th	Free Soil	Lewis M. Curtis	1,290	6.19 / 100	3rd
1852	November 2	Illinois	8th	Independent Democrat	William Henry Bissell	5,937	39.79 / 100	**Re-elected as Independent Democrat**
1852	November 2	Michigan	4th	Free Soil	Ephraim Calkins	1,048	5.05 / 100	3rd
1852	November 2	New Jersey	1st	Native American	Joseph Franklin	905	6.06 / 100	3rd
1852	November 2	New York	4th	Independent	Patrick Kelly	1,712	18.86 / 100	3rd
1852	November 2	New York	5th	Independent	Joseph C. Morton	818	7.82 / 100	3rd
1852	November 2	New York	17th	Free Soil	James Reddington	1,601	8.44 / 100	3rd
1852	November 2	New York	20th	Independent Whig	Joshua A. Spencer	1,542	9.08 / 100	3rd
1852	November 2	New York	22nd	Free Soil	Gerrit Smith	8,049	40.5 / 100	**Elected**
1852	November 2	New York	23rd	Independent; Supported by Whigs	Caleb Lyon	8,937	52.88 / 100	**Elected**
1852	November 2	New York	24th	Free Soil	Robert R. Raymond	1,458	10.28 / 100	3rd
1852	November 2	New York	25th	Free Soil	Samuel S. Cuyler	1,147	5.95 / 100	3rd
1852	November 2	New York	30th	Free Soil	John D. Landon	976	5.03 / 100	3rd
1852	November 2	New York	31st	Free Soil	Peter P. Murphy	1,358	10.67 / 100	3rd
1852	November 2	Vermont	3rd First Trial	Free Soil Democratic	Charles D. Kesson	2,294	19.44 / 100	3rd
1852	November 2	Virginia	15th Special Election	Independent People's	Waitman T. Willey	5,902	44.63 / 100	2nd
1852	November 2	Wisconsin	1st	Free Soil	Charles Durkee	5,731	31.94 / 100	Lost re-election 2nd
1852	November 2	Wisconsin	2nd	Free Soil	James L. Enos	1,497	7.41 / 100	3rd
1852	November 2	Wisconsin	3rd	Free Soil	Hiram McKee	2,168	8.25 / 100	3rd
1852	November 8	Massachusetts	1st	Free Soil	Rodney French	2,207	21.73 / 100	3rd
1852	November 8	Massachusetts	2nd	Free Soil	Gershorn B. Weston	4,302	33.17 / 100	2nd
1852	November 8	Massachusetts	2nd Special Election	Free Soil	John B. Alley	3,565	26.2 / 100	2nd
1852	November 8	Massachusetts	3rd	Free Soil	Charles Francis Adams Sr.	4,170	37.17 / 100	2nd
1852	November 8	Massachusetts	4th	Free Soil	Charles M. Ellis	1,028	14.55 / 100	3rd
1852	November 8	Massachusetts	4th Special Election	Free Soil	John A. Bolles	4,165	28.95 / 100	2nd
1852	November 8	Massachusetts	5th	Free Soil	Anson Burlingame	1,550	18.67 / 100	3rd
1852	November 8	Massachusetts	6th	Free Soil	George Wood	2,531	21.27 / 100	3rd
1852	November 8	Massachusetts	7th	Free Soil	John A. Bollet	2,599	20.89 / 100	3rd
1852	November 8	Massachusetts	7th	Independent	Gorham Brooks	793	6.37 / 100	4th
1852	November 8	Massachusetts	8th	Free Soil	Henry Wilson	3,614	28.38 / 100	2nd
1852	November 8	Massachusetts	8th	Independent	Ithamer W. Beard	721	5.66 / 100	4th
1852	November 8	Massachusetts	9th	Free Soil	Alexander De Witt	5,273	37.79 / 100	**Elected**
1852	November 8	Massachusetts	9th Special Election	Free Soil	Christopher A. Church	3,920	33.02 / 100	2nd
1852	November 8	Massachusetts	10th	Free Soil	Erastus Hopkins	2,545	18.79 / 100	3rd
1852	November 8	Massachusetts	11th	Free Soil	James T. Robinson	2,002	13.33 / 100	3rd
1852	December 13	Massachusetts	1st Second Trial	Independent	Abraham H. Howland	2,368	37.09 / 100	2nd
1852	December 13	Massachusetts	2nd Second Trial	Free Soil	Gershorn B. Weston	3,455	44.34 / 100	2nd
1852	December 13	Massachusetts	2nd Special Election; Second Trial	Free Soil	George Hood	4,821	45.73 / 100	2nd
1852	December 13	Massachusetts	3rd Second Trial	Free Soil	Charles Francis Adams Sr.	2,978	42.4 / 100	2nd
1852	December 13	Massachusetts	4th Special Election; Second Trial	Free Soil	John A. Bolles	4,055	45.1 / 100	2nd
1852	December 13	Massachusetts	6th Second Trial	Free Soil	George Wood	4,096	45.04 / 100	2nd
1852	December 13	Massachusetts	8th Second Trial	Free Soil	Henry Wilson	4,319	44.96 / 100	2nd
1852	December 13	Massachusetts	9th Second Trial	Free Soil	Alexander De Witt	4,039	41.38 / 100	**Elected**
1852	December 13	Massachusetts	10th Second Trial	Free Soil	Erastus Hopkins	1,507	20.67 / 100	3rd
1853	March 1	South Carolina	4th	Unknown	Francis Wilkinson Pickens	1,497	23.22 / 100	2nd
1853	March 1	South Carolina	4th	Unknown	Charles P. Sullivan	1,460	22.64 / 100	3rd
1853	March 1	South Carolina	4th	Unknown	J. Foster Marshall	1,405	21.79 / 100	4th
1853	March 1	South Carolina	5th	Unknown	Daniel Wallace	168	9.18 / 100	2nd
1853	March 1	South Carolina	6th	Unknown	F. J. Moses	2,270	45.41 / 100	2nd
1853	March 8	New Hampshire	1st	Free Soil; Supported by Whigs	Amos Tuck	8,962	46.85 / 100	Lost re-election 2nd
1853	March 8	New Hampshire	2nd	Free Soil	John Preston	1,742	11.5 / 100	3rd
1853	April 4	Connecticut	3rd	Free Soil	Albert G. Peck	1,800	15.21 / 100	3rd
1853	May 3	South Carolina	3rd Special Election	Unknown	A. W. Owens	1,848	44.54 / 100	2nd
1853	May 26	Virginia	1st	Unknown	Louis C. Finney	418	39.92 / 100	2nd
1853	May 26	Virginia	2nd	Independent Democrat	William D. Roberts	379	6.7 / 100	3rd
1853	May 26	Virginia	4th	Unknown	William C. Flournoy	394	14.56 / 100	3rd
1853	May 26	Virginia	5th	Independent	Thomas H. Arverett	428	5.15 / 100	3rd
1853	May 26	Virginia	11th	Independent Democrat	Charles S. Lewis	4,488	38.34 / 100	2nd
1853	August 1	Missouri	3rd	Anti-Benton Democrat	Claiborne Fox Jackson	6,674	49.43 / 100	2nd
1853	August 1	Missouri	7th	Benton Democrat	Albert Jackson	2,542	22.77 / 100	2nd
1853	August 1	Missouri	7th	Anti-Benton Democrat	Thomas B. English	2,424	21.72 / 100	3rd
1853	August 1	Missouri	7th	Benton Democrat	Fermin A. Rosier	1,750	15.68 / 100	4th
1853	August 4	North Carolina	2nd	Independent	W. C. Loftin	2,653	31.34 / 100	2nd
1853	August 4	North Carolina	3rd	Land Distribution Democrat	Walter F. Leake	3,351	37.56 / 100	2nd
1853	August 4	North Carolina	4th	Land Distribution Democrat	Abraham Watkins Venable	4,133	38.31 / 100	Lost re-election as Land Distribution Democrat; 2nd
1853	August 4	North Carolina	4th	Anti-Land Distribution Democrat	Augustis M. Lewis	2,454	22.75 / 100	3rd
1853	August 4	North Carolina	5th	Independent Democrat	Abraham Rencher	963	13.76 / 100	2nd
1853	August 8	Alabama	1st	Southern Rights	Philip Phillips	4,880	50.53 / 100	**Elected**
1853	August 8	Alabama	1st	Union	E. Lockwood	4,777	49.47 / 100	2nd
1853	August 8	Alabama	2nd	Union	James Abercrombie	7,474	56.14 / 100	**Re-elected**
1853	August 8	Alabama	3rd	Southern Rights	Sampson Willis Harris	6,394	79.48 / 100	**Re-elected**
1853	August 8	Alabama	3rd	Union	S. D. Moore	1,622	20.52 / 100	2nd
1853	August 8	Alabama	4th	Union	William Russell Smith	3,045	34.65 / 100	**Re-elected**
1853	August 8	Alabama	4th	Southern Rights	Sydenham Moore	2,974	33.84 / 100	2nd
1853	August 8	Alabama	6th	Union	Williamson Robert Winfield Cobb	5,221	58.24 / 100	**Re-elected**
1853	August 8	Alabama	7th	Southern Rights	James Ferguson Dowdell	6,078	65.51 / 100	**Elected**
1853	August 8	Alabama	7th	Union	Thomas G. Garrett	3,200	34.49 / 100	2nd
1853	October 3	Georgia	6th	Unknown	Hopkins Holsey	2,358	17.65 / 100	3rd
1853	October 3	Georgia	6th	Unknown	William M. Morton	2,229	16.68 / 100	4th
1853	November 2	Maryland	1st	Independent	John S. Stevenson	5,136	46.45 / 100	2nd
1853	November 2	Maryland	3rd	Independent	William P. Preston	5,061	46.27 / 100	2nd
1853	November 2	Maryland	5th	Independent	Francis Thomas	6,457	46.12 / 100	2nd
1853	November 2	Maryland	6th	Independent	Daniel Jenifer	4,158	46.75 / 100	2nd

== 1854–1855 ==
Notable third-party House performances (1854–1855) – 209 entries - 83 victories
Year	Date	State	District	Party	Candidate	# Votes	% Votes	Place
1854	August 7	Missouri	1st	Benton Democrat	Thomas Hart Benton	5,298	45.84 / 100	Lost re-election 2nd
1854	August 7	Missouri	2nd	Benton Democrat	Tully Cornick	6,877	45.86 / 100	2nd
1854	August 7	Missouri	4th	Benton Democrat	Shelton J. Howe	2,787	19.08 / 100	3rd
1854	August 7	Missouri	5th	Benton Democrat	Thomas Lawson Price	4,904	35.5 / 100	2nd
1854	August 7	Missouri	6th	Benton Democrat	Waldo P. Johnson	7,982	48.9 / 100	2nd
1854	September 6	California	At-large (2)	Broderick Democrat (Note: Faction of the California Democratic Party supportive of Senator David C. Broderick.)	James Churchman	10,006	6.09 / 100	5th
1854	September 6	California	At-large (2)	Broderick Democrat	James A. McDougall	9,968	6.07 / 100	Lost re-election 6th
1854	October 10	Indiana	1st	People's	Sam Hall	9,051	47.85 / 100	2nd
1854	October 10	Indiana	2nd	People's	Thomas C. Slaught	8,345	48.3 / 100	2nd
1854	October 10	Indiana	3rd	People's	George Grundy Dunn	9,989	54.53 / 100	**Elected**
1854	October 10	Indiana	4th	People's	William Cumback	9,061	51.92 / 100	**Elected**
1854	October 10	Indiana	5th	People's	David P. Holloway	9,419	64.25 / 100	**Elected**
1854	October 10	Indiana	6th	People's	Lucien Barbour	9,824	51.41 / 100	**Elected**
1854	October 10	Indiana	7th	People's	Harvey D. Scott	9,515	52.58 / 100	**Elected**
1854	October 10	Indiana	8th	People's	Daniel Mace	10,357	56.92 / 100	**Re-elected as People's**
1854	October 10	Indiana	9th	People's	Schuyler Colfax	9,989	54.85 / 100	**Elected**
1854	October 10	Indiana	10th	People's	Samuel Brenton	7,484	56.0 / 100	**Elected**
1854	October 10	Indiana	11th	People's	John U. Pettit	9,389	56.59 / 100	**Elected**
1854	October 10	Ohio	1st	Anti-Nebraska	Timothy C. Day	7,716	63.46 / 100	**Elected**
1854	October 10	Ohio	2nd	Anti-Nebraska	John Scott Harrison	7,562	66.03 / 100	**Re-elected as Anti-Nebraska**
1854	October 10	Ohio	3rd	Anti-Nebraska	Lewis D. Campbell	9,058	58.25 / 100	**Re-elected as Anti-Nebraska**
1854	October 10	Ohio	4th	Anti-Nebraska	Matthias H. Nichols	10,307	70.19 / 100	**Re-elected as Anti-Nebraska**
1854	October 10	Ohio	5th	Anti-Nebraska	Richard Mott	8,253	61.62 / 100	**Elected**
1854	October 10	Ohio	6th	Anti-Nebraska	Jonas R. Emrie	9,990	65.04 / 100	**Elected**
1854	October 10	Ohio	7th	Anti-Nebraska	Aaron Harlan	9,928	81.14 / 100	**Re-elected as Anti-Nebraska**
1854	October 10	Ohio	8th	Anti-Nebraska	Benjamin Stanton	11,000	75.84 / 100	**Elected**
1854	October 10	Ohio	9th	Anti-Nebraska	Cooper K. Watson	8,399	59.92 / 100	**Elected**
1854	October 10	Ohio	10th	Anti-Nebraska	Oscar F. Moore	8,865	65.32 / 100	**Elected**
1854	October 10	Ohio	11th	Anti-Nebraska	Valentine B. Horton	9,818	58.7 / 100	**Elected**
1854	October 10	Ohio	12th	Anti-Nebraska	Samuel Galloway	9,698	60.28 / 100	**Elected**
1854	October 10	Ohio	13th	Anti-Nebraska	John Sherman	8,617	59.8 / 100	**Elected**
1854	October 10	Ohio	14th	Anti-Nebraska	Philemon Bliss	8,788	59.26 / 100	**Elected**
1854	October 10	Ohio	15th	Anti-Nebraska	William R. Sapp	9,371	58.99 / 100	**Re-elected as Anti-Nebraska**
1854	October 10	Ohio	16th	Anti-Nebraska	Edward Ball	7,265	58.89 / 100	**Re-elected as Anti-Nebraska**
1854	October 10	Ohio	17th	Anti-Nebraska	Charles J. Albright	8,332	58.07 / 100	**Elected**
1854	October 10	Ohio	18th	Anti-Nebraska	Benjamin F. Leiter	8,738	63.36 / 100	**Elected**
1854	October 10	Ohio	19th	Anti-Nebraska	Edward Wade	7,699	71.07 / 100	**Re-elected as Anti-Nebraska**
1854	October 10	Ohio	20th	Anti-Nebraska	Joshua Reed Giddings	6,972	64.83 / 100	**Re-elected as Anti-Nebraska**
1854	October 10	Ohio	21st	Anti-Nebraska	John Bingham	9,860	65.31 / 100	**Elected**
1854	October 10	Pennsylvania	2nd	Independent Whig	Joseph Ripley Chandler	1,196	11.56 / 100	Lost re-election as Independent Whig; 3rd
1854	October 10	Pennsylvania	4th	American	Jacob Broom	6,747	49.63 / 100	**Elected**
1854	October 10	Pennsylvania	9th	Independent Whig	Anthony Ellmaker Roberts	6,259	39.38 / 100	**Elected**
1854	October 10	Pennsylvania	14th	Free Soil Democratic	Galusha A. Grow	13,062	95.22 / 100	**Re-elected as Free Soil Democratic**
1854	October 10	Pennsylvania	18th	Independent Whig	Jacob Croswell	3,217	27.64 / 100	2nd
1854	October 10	Pennsylvania	24th	Independent Democrat	Richard Arthurs	3,830	26.25 / 100	2nd
1854	October 10	South Carolina	1st	Unknown	I. D. Wilson	2,488	32.56 / 100	2nd
1854	October 10	South Carolina	3rd	Unknown	A. C. Garlington	3,051	33.16 / 100	2nd
1854	November 7	Illinois	1st	Anti-Nebraska Democrat	E. P. Ferry	927	7.68 / 100	3rd
1854	November 7	Illinois	2nd	Anti-Nebraska Democrat	Edward L. Mayo	996	7.63 / 100	4th
1854	November 7	New Jersey	1st	Temperance (Note: Early forerunner of the Prohibition Party.)	John W. Hazelton	3,949	27.05 / 100	3rd
1854	November 7	New Jersey	4th	Independent Anti-Nebraska	Peter Osborne	6,816	48.35 / 100	2nd
1854	November 7	New York	1st	American	William Valk	4,215	31.19 / 100	**Elected**
1854	November 7	New York	1st	Hard Shell Democrat (Note: Faction of the New York Democratic Party opposing reconciliation between the Democratic Party and Barnburner Democrats (who had defected in 1848 to support the Free Soil Party).)	Daniel B. Allen	2,769	20.49 / 100	2nd
1854	November 7	New York	1st	Soft Shell Democrat (Note: Faction of the New York Democratic Party which favored reconciliation between the Democratic Party and Barnburner Democrats (who had defected in 1848 to support the Free Soil Party).)	Frederick William Lord	2,227	16.48 / 100	4th
1854	November 7	New York	1st	Temperance	Gabriel Poilon Disosway	1,540	11.4 / 100	5th
1854	November 7	New York	3rd	Hard Shell Democrat	George D. Clinton	2,556	30.7 / 100	2nd
1854	November 7	New York	3rd	Soft Shell Democrat	William Miner	1,685	20.24 / 100	3rd
1854	November 7	New York	4th	Soft Shell Democrat	John Kelly	3,068	40.54 / 100	**Elected**
1854	November 7	New York	4th	Hard Shell Democrat	Michael Walsh	3,050	40.3 / 100	Lost re-election as Hard Shell; 2nd
1854	November 7	New York	4th	American	John W. Boyce	626	8.27 / 100	4th
1854	November 7	New York	5th	American	Thomas R. Whitney	3,320	30.86 / 100	**Elected**
1854	November 7	New York	5th	Hard Shell Democrat	Philip Hamilton	2,718	25.27 / 100	3rd
1854	November 7	New York	5th	Soft Shell Democrat	Abraham J. Berry	1,954	18.16 / 100	4th
1854	November 7	New York	6th	Hard Shell Democrat	John Wheeler	5,102	51.58 / 100	**Re-elected as Hard Shell**
1854	November 7	New York	6th	Soft Shell Democrat	John M. Murphy	2,533	25.61 / 100	2nd
1854	November 7	New York	8th	Hard Shell Democrat	James Langdon Curtis	3,069	32.52 / 100	2nd
1854	November 7	New York	8th	Soft Shell Democrat	Edward B. Fellows	1,473	15.61 / 100	3rd
1854	November 7	New York	9th	Hard Shell Democrat	Benjamin Brandeth	2,560	19.64 / 100	2nd
1854	November 7	New York	9th	Hard Shell Democrat	James R. Whiting	1,960	15.04 / 100	3rd
1854	November 7	New York	10th	Hard Shell Democrat	Charles S. Woodworth	4,564	38.59 / 100	2nd
1854	November 7	New York	10th	Soft Shell Democrat	Jonathan Stratton	2,053	17.36 / 100	3rd
1854	November 7	New York	12th	Soft Shell Democrat	Hugh W. McClelland	5,540	33.78 / 100	2nd
1854	November 7	New York	12th	Hard Shell Democrat	William H. Wilson	2,486	15.16 / 100	3rd
1854	November 7	New York	13th	Soft Shell Democrat	Henry A. Clum	2,075	18.86 / 100	2nd
1854	November 7	New York	13th	Hard Shell Democrat	Alanson Cook	1,971	17.92 / 100	3rd
1854	November 7	New York	14th	American	John W. Harcourt	4,270	28.45 / 100	2nd
1854	November 7	New York	14th	Soft Shell Democrat	John V. L. Pruyn	3,844	25.62 / 100	3rd
1854	November 7	New York	14th	Hard Shell Democrat	Hamilton David	2,255	15.03 / 100	4th
1854	November 7	New York	15th	Hard Shell Democrat	Orville Clark	6,358	35.34 / 100	2nd
1854	November 7	New York	15th	Soft Shell Democrat	Charles Hughes	2,471	16.48 / 100	Lost re-election as Soft Shell; 3rd
1854	November 7	New York	15th	Temperance	James M. Andrews	2,404	13.36 / 100	4th
1854	November 7	New York	16th	American	Jerome B. Bailey	3,121	27.06 / 100	2nd
1854	November 7	New York	16th	Soft Shell Democrat	Gorton T. Thomas	1,732	15.02 / 100	3rd
1854	November 7	New York	16th	Hard Shell Democrat	Joseph R. Flanders	1,125	9.75 / 100	4th
1854	November 7	New York	17th	Soft Shell Democrat	Francis E. Spinner	7,618	50.62 / 100	**Elected**
1854	November 7	New York	17th	Hard Shell Democrat	Nathaniel S. Benton	2,014	13.38 / 100	3rd
1854	November 7	New York	19th	Soft Shell Democrat	Lewis R. Palmer	6,444	41.33 / 100	2nd
1854	November 7	New York	19th	Free Soil	William B. Hawes	1,339	8.59 / 100	3rd
1854	November 7	New York	19th	Hard Shell Democrat	Hezekiah Sturgis	1,066	6.84 / 100	4th
1854	November 7	New York	20th	Soft Shell Democrat	William C. Johnson	5,172	30.4 / 100	2nd
1854	November 7	New York	20th	Independent Whig	Benjamin N. Huntington	4,759	27.98 / 100	3rd
1854	November 7	New York	21st	Hard Shell Democrat	Edward Tompkins	5,579	32.04 / 100	2nd
1854	November 7	New York	21st	Soft Shell Democrat	Oliver C. Crocker	2,077	11.93 / 100	3rd
1854	November 7	New York	22nd	Soft Shell Democrat	Leander Babcock	4,729	27.5 / 100	2nd
1854	November 7	New York	22nd	Free Soil	Charles G. Case	3,652	21.24 / 100	3rd
1854	November 7	New York	22nd	Hard Shell Democrat	William Lewis	3,281	19.08 / 100	4th
1854	November 7	New York	23rd	Soft Shell Democrat	Willard Ives	5,645	41.86 / 100	2nd
1854	November 7	New York	23rd	Hard Shell Democrat	Lysander Brown	1,513	11.22 / 100	3rd
1854	November 7	New York	24th	Soft Shell Democrat	Thomas G. Alvord	4,109	32.08 / 100	2nd
1854	November 7	New York	24th	American	B. Davis Noxon	3,409	26.62 / 100	3rd
1854	November 7	New York	25th	Soft Shell Democrat	George H. Middleton	6,910	43.5 / 100	2nd
1854	November 7	New York	25th	Hard Shell Democrat	William F. Aldrich	1,295	8.15 / 100	3rd
1854	November 7	New York	26th	Soft Shell Democrat	Andrew Oliver	6,871	47.74 / 100	**Re-elected as Soft Shell**
1854	November 7	New York	26th	Hard Shell Democrat	Thomas M. Howell	2,187	15.2 / 100	3rd
1854	November 7	New York	27th	Soft Shell Democrat	John G. McDowell	4,701	26.45 / 100	2nd
1854	November 7	New York	27th	Hard Shell Democrat	Stephen B. Cushing	2,183	12.28 / 100	3rd
1854	November 7	New York	28th	Soft Shell Democrat	George Hastings	4,450	27.72 / 100	Lost re-election as Soft Shell; 2nd
1854	November 7	New York	29th	Soft Shell Democrat	John Williams	5,609	47.94 / 100	**Elected**
1854	November 7	New York	29th	Hard Shell Democrat	Joseph Sibley	1,865	15.94 / 100	3rd
1854	November 7	New York	30th	Soft Shell Democrat	Albert P. Laning	3,901	23.62 / 100	2nd
1854	November 7	New York	30th	Hard Shell Democrat	Charles W. Belden	2,410	14.6 / 100	3rd
1854	November 7	New York	31st	Free Soil	Edward J. Chase	962	10.25 / 100	3rd
1854	November 7	New York	32nd	Soft Shell Democrat	Israel T. Hatch	5,388	35.15 / 100	2nd
1854	November 7	New York	32nd	Hard Shell Democrat	Nelson Randall	865	5.64 / 100	3rd
1854	November 7	New York	33rd	American	Francis S. Edwards	8,359	55.49 / 100	**Elected**
1854	November 7	New York	33rd	Soft Shell Democrat	Reuben Fenton	2,227	16.48 / 100	Lost re-election as Soft Shell; 2nd
1854	November 7	Wisconsin	3rd	Independent	Harvey G. Turner	1,924	8.06 / 100	3rd
1854	November 12	Massachusetts	1st	American	Robert Bernard Hall	5,353	63.7 / 100	**Elected**
1854	November 12	Massachusetts	2nd	American	James Buffington	8,064	68.25 / 100	**Elected**
1854	November 12	Massachusetts	2nd	Free Soil	Gresham B. Weston	774	6.55 / 100	4th
1854	November 12	Massachusetts	3rd	American	William S. Damrell	8,668	74.76 / 100	**Elected**
1854	November 12	Massachusetts	4th	American	Linus B. Comins	4,972	57.45 / 100	**Elected**
1854	November 12	Massachusetts	5th	American	Anson Burlingame	5,967	61.64 / 100	**Elected**
1854	November 12	Massachusetts	6th	American	Timothy Davis	7,428	65.39 / 100	**Elected**
1854	November 12	Massachusetts	7th	American	Nathaniel P. Banks	8,928	73.53 / 100	**Elected**
1854	November 12	Massachusetts	8th	American	Chauncey L. Knapp	7,004	62.8 / 100	**Elected**
1854	November 12	Massachusetts	9th	American	Alexander De Witt	8,795	76.97 / 100	**Re-elected as American**
1854	November 12	Massachusetts	10th	American	Henry Morris	7,723	65.35 / 100	**Elected** (Note: Died before he could take office.)
1854	November 12	Massachusetts	11th	American	Mark Trafton	6,640	50.52 / 100	**Elected**
1854	November 14	Delaware	At-large	American	Elisha D. Cullen	6,820	51.85 / 100	**Elected**
1855	March 13	New Hampshire	1st	American	James Pike	12,619	56.29 / 100	**Elected**
1855	March 13	New Hampshire	2nd	American	Mason Tappan	12,129	58.37 / 100	**Elected**
1855	March 13	New Hampshire	3rd	American	Aaron H. Cragin	12,126	58.39 / 100	**Elected**
1855	April 2	Connecticut	1st	American	Ezra Clark Jr.	8,521	52.11 / 100	**Elected**
1855	April 2	Connecticut	2nd	American	John Woodruff	9,876	55.5 / 100	**Elected**
1855	April 2	Connecticut	3rd	American	Sidney Dean	8,055	67.51 / 100	**Elected**
1855	April 2	Connecticut	4th	American	William W. Welch	9,701	56.07 / 100	**Elected**
1855	April 4	Rhode Island	1st	American	Nathan B. Durfee	6,283	75.97 / 100	**Elected**
1855	April 4	Rhode Island	2nd	American	Benjamin Babock Thurston	4,359	75.97 / 100	**Re-elected as American**
1855	May 24	Virginia	1st	Unknown	Robert Latane Montague	382	9.85 / 100	2nd
1855	May 24	Virginia	2nd	American	Samuel Watts	4,141	46.71 / 100	2nd
1855	May 24	Virginia	3rd	American	William C. Scott	5,466	47.88 / 100	2nd
1855	May 24	Virginia	4th	American	Littleton Waller Tazewell	2,700	38.73 / 100	2nd
1855	May 24	Virginia	5th	American	N. C. Claiborne	5,142	42.75 / 100	2nd
1855	May 24	Virginia	6th	American	Littlebury N. Ligon	2,976	43.32 / 100	2nd
1855	May 24	Virginia	7th	American	B. Johnson Barbour	886	13.77 / 100	2nd
1855	May 24	Virginia	7th	Independent	David Funsten	529	8.22 / 100	3rd
1855	May 24	Virginia	8th	American	Alexander Boteler	6,959	49.29 / 100	2nd
1855	May 24	Virginia	10th	American	William N. Pendleton	6,248	45.5 / 100	2nd
1855	May 24	Virginia	11th	American	John S. Carlile	8,333	51.2 / 100	**Elected**
1855	May 24	Virginia	12th	American	Waller Redd Staples	6,385	46.01 / 100	2nd
1855	May 24	Virginia	13th	American	Trigg	3,525	40.82 / 100	2nd
1855	August 2	North Carolina	1st	American	Robert Treat Paine	5,228	51.71 / 100	**Elected**
1855	August 2	North Carolina	2nd	American	Thomas J. Latham	3,464	33.95 / 100	2nd
1855	August 2	North Carolina	3rd	American	David Reid	4,863	45.06 / 100	2nd
1855	August 2	North Carolina	4th	American	James B. Shepard	4,223	38.33 / 100	2nd
1855	August 2	North Carolina	5th	American	Edwin Godwin Reade	7,061	65.28 / 100	**Elected**
1855	August 2	North Carolina	6th	American	Richard Clauselle Puryear	6,516	51.45 / 100	**Re-elected as American**
1855	August 2	North Carolina	7th	American	Samuel N. Stowe	4,104	37.83 / 100	2nd
1855	August 2	North Carolina	8th	American	Leander B. Carmichael	6,584	44.9 / 100	2nd
1855	August 2	Tennessee	1st	American	Nathaniel Green Taylor	7,511	48.57 / 100	Lost re-election as American; 2nd
1855	August 2	Tennessee	2nd	American	William Henry Sneed	6,249	52.15 / 100	**Elected**
1855	August 2	Tennessee	3rd	American	Josiah M. Anderson	7,331	48.22 / 100	2nd
1855	August 2	Tennessee	4th	American	William Cullom	5,563	48.04 / 100	Lost re-election as American; 2nd
1855	August 2	Tennessee	5th	American	Charles Ready	7,069	91.79 / 100	**Re-elected as American**
1855	August 2	Tennessee	6th	American	Powhattan Gordon	4,245	33.37 / 100	2nd
1855	August 2	Tennessee	7th	American	William Kendrick	5,922	42.76 / 100	2nd
1855	August 2	Tennessee	8th	American	Felix Zollicoffer	6,958	58.89 / 100	**Re-elected as American**
1855	August 2	Tennessee	9th	American	Emerson Etheridge	7,952	51.82 / 100	**Re-elected as American**
1855	August 2	Tennessee	10th	American	Thomas Rivers	5,860	53.29 / 100	**Elected**
1855	August 6	Alabama	1st	American	Percy Walker	5,653	52.4 / 100	**Elected**
1855	August 6	Alabama	2nd	American	Julius Caesar Alford	5,520	45.11 / 100	2nd
1855	August 6	Alabama	3rd	American	Thomas H. Watts	5,808	47.8 / 100	2nd
1855	August 6	Alabama	4th	American	William Russell Smith	5,787	59.83 / 100	**Re-elected as American**
1855	August 6	Alabama	6th	Know Nothing Independent	James M. Adams	3,697	37.13 / 100	2nd
1855	August 6	Alabama	7th	Know Nothing Independent	William B. Martin	5,220	42.72 / 100	2nd
1855	August 6	Kentucky	1st	American	W. G. Hughes	5,708	37.98 / 100	2nd
1855	August 6	Kentucky	2nd	American	John P. Campbell Jr.	7,533	55.29 / 100	**Elected**
1855	August 6	Kentucky	3rd	American	Warner Underwood	7,362	56.89 / 100	**Elected**
1855	August 6	Kentucky	4th	American	Fountain T. Fox	6,570	49.94 / 100	2nd
1855	August 6	Kentucky	5th	American	C. G. Wintersmith	6,628	48.37 / 100	2nd
1855	August 6	Kentucky	6th	American	George W. Dunlap	6,340	45.21 / 100	2nd
1855	August 6	Kentucky	7th	American	Humphrey Marshall	6,932	61.29 / 100	**Elected**
1855	August 6	Kentucky	8th	American	Alexander Keith Marshall	7,039	55.98 / 100	**Elected**
1855	August 6	Kentucky	9th	American	Leander Cox	8,085	55.06 / 100	**Re-elected as American**
1855	August 6	Kentucky	10th	American	Samuel F. Swope	7,490	51.72 / 100	**Elected**
1855	August 6	Texas	1st	American	Lemuel D. Evans	10,352	50.1 / 100	**Elected**
1855	August 6	Texas	2nd	American	John Hancock	9,427	39.24 / 100	2nd
1855	October 1	Georgia	1st	American	Samuel Varnadoe	4,544	42.38 / 100	2nd
1855	October 1	Georgia	2nd	American	Willis Hawkins	7,153	48.01 / 100	2nd
1855	October 1	Georgia	3rd	American	Robert Pleasant Trippe	6,116	53.97 / 100	**Elected**
1855	October 1	Georgia	4th	American	Benjamin Harvey Hill	6,813	49.74 / 100	2nd
1855	October 1	Georgia	5th	American	Lewis Tumblin	7,973	41.39 / 100	2nd
1855	October 1	Georgia	6th	American	Leonidas Franklin	5,227	36.22 / 100	2nd
1855	October 1	Georgia	7th	American	Nathaniel Greene Foster	4,792	51.13 / 100	**Elected**
1855	October 1	Georgia	8th	American	Lafayette Lamar	3,079	34.65 / 100	2nd
1855	November 5	Louisiana	1st	American	George Eustis Jr.	2,588	53.41 / 100	**Elected**
1855	November 5	Louisiana	2nd	American	Theodore Gaillard Hunt	5,811	48.46 / 100	Lost re-election as American; 2nd
1855	November 5	Louisiana	3rd	American	Preston Pond	4,616	49.39 / 100	2nd
1855	November 5	Louisiana	4th	American	William B. Lewis	6,491	41.95 / 100	2nd
1855	November 6	Maryland	1st	American	John Dennis	5,868	48.73 / 100	2nd
1855	November 6	Maryland	2nd	American	James Barroll Ricaud	8,484	56.58 / 100	**Elected**
1855	November 6	Maryland	3rd	American	James Morrison Harris	6,538	50.21 / 100	**Elected**
1855	November 6	Maryland	4th	American	Henry Winter Davis	7,988	51.6 / 100	**Elected**
1855	November 6	Maryland	5th	American	Henry William Hoffman	8,320	52.36 / 100	**Elected**
1855	November 6	Maryland	6th	American	William Watkins	4,746	46.07 / 100	2nd
1855	November 6	Mississippi	1st	American	J. H. Taylor	5,731	44.48 / 100	2nd
1855	November 6	Mississippi	2nd	American	L. E. Houston	5,554	48.36 / 100	2nd
1855	November 6	Mississippi	3rd	American	Joseph B. Cobb	5,894	44.52 / 100	2nd
1855	November 6	Mississippi	4th	American	William A. Lake	5,907	50.77 / 100	**Elected**
1855	November 6	Mississippi	5th	American	Giles M. Hillyer	4,489	40.64 / 100	2nd

== 1856–1857 ==
Notable third-party House performances (1856–1857) – 154 entries - 23 victories
Year	Date	State	District	Party	Candidate	# Votes	% Votes	Place
1856	August 4	Arkansas	1st	American	Hugh French Thomason	6,161	28.58 / 100	2nd
1856	August 4	Arkansas	2nd	American	Absalom Fowler	8,701	42.37 / 100	2nd
1856	August 4	Missouri	1st	Benton Democrat	Francis Preston Blair Jr.	6,035	43.84 / 100	**Elected**
1856	August 4	Missouri	2nd	American	Thomas Lilbourne Anderson	8,876	52.14 / 100	**Elected**
1856	August 4	Missouri	3rd	American	James Johnson Lindley	8,172	44.66 / 100	Lost re-election as American; 2nd
1856	August 4	Missouri	4th	American	James H. Moses	6,274	40.76 / 100	2nd
1856	August 4	Missouri	5th	American	Samuel H. Woodson	6,006	41.58 / 100	**Elected**
1856	August 4	Missouri	5th	Benton Democrat	Thomas Lawson Price	3,755	26.0 / 100	3rd
1856	August 4	Missouri	6th	American	Burr H. Emerson	6,911	41.29 / 100	2nd
1856	August 4	Missouri	7th	American	David E. Perrymen	4,883	31.14 / 100	2nd
1856	August 4	Missouri	7th	Benton Democrat	John D. Stephenson	2,556	16.3 / 100	3rd
1856	October 6	Florida	At-large	American	James M. Baker	5,650	46.92 / 100	2nd
1856	October 14	Ohio	1st	American	James F. Torrence	2,642	20.28 / 100	3rd
1856	October 14	Ohio	2nd	American	John Scott Harrison	3,229	24.26 / 100	Lost re-election as American; 3rd
1856	October 14	Ohio	6th	American	John A. Trimble	1,598	9.05 / 100	3rd
1856	October 14	Ohio	7th	American	Willard Ellsberry	1,011	6.69 / 100	3rd
1856	October 14	Ohio	8th	American	John W. Glover	1,239	7.2 / 100	3rd
1856	October 14	Ohio	10th	American	Oscar F. Moore	4,326	24.92 / 100	Lost re-election as American; 3rd
1856	October 14	Ohio	16th	American	John Haynes	1,382	9.16 / 100	3rd
1856	October 14	Ohio	17th	American	Joseph Davenport	2,013	11.91 / 100	3rd
1856	October 14	Pennsylvania	1st	Union (Note: The Union Party in Pennsylvania was a coalition of Republicans, Americans, Whigs and Democrats opposed to the local Democratic Party and its favorite son (and national party presidential nominee) James Buchanan, in an effort to prevent vote splitting between those parties involved.)	Edward B. Knight	7,275	43.38 / 100	2nd
1856	October 14	Pennsylvania	2nd	Union	Edward Joy Morris	6,411	51.58 / 100	**Elected**
1856	October 14	Pennsylvania	3rd	Union	William Millward	6,753	45.98 / 100	Lost re-election as Union; 2nd
1856	October 14	Pennsylvania	4th	American	Robert Foust	6,560	35.86 / 100	2nd
1856	October 14	Pennsylvania	5th	Union	Daniel H. Mulvaney	7,961	45.14 / 100	2nd
1856	October 14	Pennsylvania	6th	Union	John S. Bowen	7,851	47.85 / 100	2nd
1856	October 14	Pennsylvania	7th	Union	Samuel Carey Bradshaw	8,789	45.99 / 100	Lost re-election as Union; 2nd
1856	October 14	Pennsylvania	8th	Union	David Yoder	3,947	28.4 / 100	2nd
1856	October 14	Pennsylvania	9th	Union	Anthony Ellmaker Roberts	10,001	54.59 / 100	**Re-elected as Union**
1856	October 14	Pennsylvania	10th	Union	John Christian Kunkel	9,227	55.63 / 100	**Re-elected as Union**
1856	October 14	Pennsylvania	11th	Union	James Hepburn Campbell	6,418	41.74 / 100	Lost re-election as Union; 2nd
1856	October 14	Pennsylvania	12th	Union	Elhanan Smith	7,657	42.31 / 100	2nd
1856	October 14	Pennsylvania	13th	Union	Samuel E. Dimmick	5,065	31.07 / 100	2nd
1856	October 14	Pennsylvania	14th	Union	Galusha A. Grow	13,325	71.31 / 100	**Re-elected as Union**
1856	October 14	Pennsylvania	15th	Union	William H. Irvin	9,451	48.64 / 100	2nd
1856	October 14	Pennsylvania	16th	Union	Lemuel Todd	9,630	46.25 / 100	Lost re-election as Union; 2nd
1856	October 14	Pennsylvania	17th	Union	Joseph Pumroy	9,715	48.72 / 100	2nd
1856	October 14	Pennsylvania	18th	Union	John Rufus Edie	8,792	50.91 / 100	**Re-elected as Union**
1856	October 14	Pennsylvania	19th	Union	John Covode	10,409	54.4 / 100	**Re-elected as Union**
1856	October 14	Pennsylvania	20th	Union	Jonathan Knight	9,411	47.85 / 100	Lost re-election as Union; 2nd
1856	October 14	Pennsylvania	23rd	Union	William Stewart	8,552	61.0 / 100	**Elected**
1856	October 14	Pennsylvania	24th	Union	James S. Myers	9,114	48.25 / 100	2nd
1856	October 14	Pennsylvania	25th	Union	John Dick	8,944	67.97 / 100	**Re-elected as Union**
1856	October 14	South Carolina	2nd	Unknown	John Cunningham	342	7.87 / 100	3rd
1856	November 4	California	At-Large (2)	American	B. C. Whitman	36,078	16.68 / 100	3rd
1856	November 4	California	At-Large (2)	American	A. B. Dibble	35,325	16.34 / 100	4th
1856	November 4	Delaware	At-large	American	Elisha D. Cullen	6,360	43.95 / 100	Lost re-election 2nd
1856	November 4	Massachusetts	1st	American	Daniel Fisher	1,601	14.12 / 100	3rd
1856	November 4	Massachusetts	2nd	American	Darius Dunbar	1,132	7.03 / 100	3rd
1856	November 4	Massachusetts	3rd	American	Alfred B. Ely	1,435	8.47 / 100	3rd
1856	November 4	Massachusetts	4th	American	Benjamin F. Cooke	1,678	14.85 / 100	3rd
1856	November 4	Massachusetts	5th	American	William Appleton	6,513	49.74 / 100	2nd
1856	November 4	Massachusetts	6th	American	Benjamin Perley	1,121	7.75 / 100	3rd
1856	November 4	Massachusetts	7th	American	Isaac Story	2,049	11.74 / 100	3rd
1856	November 4	Massachusetts	9th	American	Alexander De Witt	4,414	26.57 / 100	Lost re-election 2nd
1856	November 4	Massachusetts	10th	American	William C. Fowler	4,081	27.34 / 100	2nd
1856	November 4	Massachusetts	11th	American	Mark Trafton	4,194	27.41 / 100	Lost re-election 3rd
1856	November 4	New Jersey	4th	American	Charles Ingalls	2,355	13.54 / 100	3rd
1856	November 4	New Jersey	5th	American	Frederick B. Betts	5,640	26.34 / 100	3rd
1856	November 4	New York	1st	American	Richard Jennings	5,892	31.2 / 100	2nd
1856	November 4	New York	2nd	American	Edward T. Wood	5,476	26.0 / 100	3rd
1856	November 4	New York	2nd	Independent	Alexander McCue	1,123	5.33 / 100	4th
1856	November 4	New York	3rd	American	Augustine Joseph Hickey Duganne	2,905	27.03 / 100	2nd
1856	November 4	New York	4th	American	W. F. Gould	1,735	15.02 / 100	2nd
1856	November 4	New York	5th	American	Daniel L. Northrup	3,798	26.93 / 100	2nd
1856	November 4	New York	5th	Independent Democrat	Philip Hamilton	1,169	8.29 / 100	4th
1856	November 4	New York	6th	American	Aras Williams	3,658	24.1 / 100	3rd
1856	November 4	New York	7th	American	George Briggs	4,461	27.98 / 100	2nd
1856	November 4	New York	7th	Independent American	John Bullock	854	5.36 / 100	4th
1856	November 4	New York	8th	American	Shepard Knapp	3,651	24.52 / 100	3rd
1856	November 4	New York	9th	American	Marcius L. Cobb	5,084	27.91 / 100	3rd
1856	November 4	New York	10th	American	Charles W. Trotter	3,936	25.11 / 100	3rd
1856	November 4	New York	11th	American	John Fream	5,902	33.36 / 100	2nd
1856	November 4	New York	12th	American	Isaac Teller	3,116	15.32 / 100	3rd
1856	November 4	New York	13th	American	John I. Fonda	4,108	29.19 / 100	3rd
1856	November 4	New York	14th	American	Eli Perry	5,095	28.27 / 100	2nd
1856	November 4	New York	15th	American	John Cramer	5,633	24.79 / 100	2nd
1856	November 4	New York	16th	American	Henry H. Ross	4,129	27.0 / 100	3rd
1856	November 4	New York	18th	American	Abel Smith	5,936	27.26 / 100	3rd
1856	November 4	New York	22nd	American	James D. Clover	1,671	7.55 / 100	3rd
1856	November 4	New York	24th	American	Henry G. Beach	1,720	10.76 / 100	3rd
1856	November 4	New York	25th	American	William Fosgate	3,644	18.26 / 100	3rd
1856	November 4	New York	26th	American	Andrew Oliver	4,264	24.12 / 100	Lost re-election as American; 2nd
1856	November 4	New York	27th	American	Abraham Lawrence	1,219	5.55 / 100	3rd
1856	November 4	New York	28th	American	Samuel Hallet	4,895	24.89 / 100	2nd
1856	November 4	New York	29th	American	George Clark	3,156	20.66 / 100	3rd
1856	November 4	New York	30th	American	Gilbert M. Cooley	2,758	12.74 / 100	3rd
1856	November 4	New York	31st	American	Washington Hunt	4,694	35.27 / 100	2nd
1856	November 4	New York	32nd	American	Solomon G. Haven	5,548	27.92 / 100	Lost re-election as American; 3rd
1856	November 4	New York	33rd	American	Francis S. Edwards	3,251	17.35 / 100	Lost re-election 3rd
1857	May 28	Virginia	1st	American	John Critcher	2,825	42.92 / 100	2nd
1857	May 28	Virginia	3rd	American	A. Judson Crane	2,931	36.28 / 100	2nd
1857	May 28	Virginia	4th	American	Robert S. Collier	1,132	24.03 / 100	2nd
1857	May 28	Virginia	7th	American	Edgar Snowden	3,941	42.5 / 100	2nd
1857	May 28	Virginia	9th	American	J. D. Imboden	2,463	24.74 / 100	2nd
1857	May 28	Virginia	10th	American	W. M. Dunnington	2,821	28.51 / 100	2nd
1857	May 28	Virginia	11th	American	John S. Carlile	6,653	46.17 / 100	Lost re-election 2nd
1857	May 28	Virginia	13th	American	Elbert S. Martin	5,249	49.67 / 100	2nd
1857	August 3	Alabama	1st	American	John McCaskill	4,310	38.05 / 100	2nd
1857	August 3	Alabama	2nd	American	Batt Peterson	4,464	37.57 / 100	2nd
1857	August 3	Alabama	3rd	American	Thomas J. Judge	6,418	49.66 / 100	2nd
1857	August 3	Alabama	4th	American	William Russell Smith	4,952	43.5 / 100	Lost re-election 2nd
1857	August 3	Alabama	5th	Southern Rights Democrat	David Hubbard	3,956	44.91 / 100	2nd
1857	August 3	Kentucky	1st	American	Owen Grimes	2,945	24.68 / 100	2nd
1857	August 3	Kentucky	2nd	American	James Leeper Johnson	6,173	46.12 / 100	2nd
1857	August 3	Kentucky	3rd	American	Warner Underwood	6,359	50.81 / 100	**Re-elected**
1857	August 3	Kentucky	4th	American	William Clayton Anderson	6,861	49.41 / 100	2nd
1857	August 3	Kentucky	5th	American	Bryan Young	4,996	40.38 / 100	2nd
1857	August 3	Kentucky	6th	American	John A. Moore	5,950	44.34 / 100	2nd
1857	August 3	Kentucky	7th	American	Humphrey Marshall	6,085	55.0 / 100	**Re-elected**
1857	August 3	Kentucky	8th	American	Roger W. Hanson	6,451	49.52 / 100	2nd
1857	August 3	Kentucky	9th	American	Leander Cox	7,534	48.04 / 100	Lost re-election 2nd
1857	August 3	Kentucky	10th	American	William L. Rankin	4,185	32.36 / 100	2nd
1857	August 3	Texas	1st	American	Lemuel D. Evans	9,929	39.29 / 100	Lost re-election 2nd
1857	August 3	Texas	2nd	American	William E. Howth	4,505	18.13 / 100	2nd
1857	August 6	North Carolina	1st	American	William N. H. Smith	5,255	49.82 / 100	2nd
1857	August 6	North Carolina	2nd	Write-In	Write-Ins	616	9.4 / 100	2nd
1857	August 6	North Carolina	3rd	American	O. P. Meares	1,488	19.02 / 100	2nd
1857	August 6	North Carolina	4th	Independent	Scattering	910	10.74 / 100	2nd
1857	August 6	North Carolina	5th	American	John Adams Gilmer	5,692	54.02 / 100	**Elected**
1857	August 6	North Carolina	6th	American	Richard Clauselle Puryear	6,950	47.51 / 100	Lost re-election 2nd
1857	August 6	North Carolina	7th	American	Atlas J. Dargan	573	8.15 / 100	2nd
1857	August 6	North Carolina	8th	American	Zebulon Baird Vance	3,211	26.25 / 100	2nd
1857	August 6	Tennessee	1st	American	Nathaniel Green Taylor	7,471	49.42 / 100	2nd
1857	August 6	Tennessee	2nd	American	Horace Maynard	5,556	50.89 / 100	**Elected**
1857	August 6	Tennessee	3rd	American	William Heiskell	6,800	47.02 / 100	2nd
1857	August 6	Tennessee	4th	American	Joseph Pickett	5,232	44.84 / 100	2nd
1857	August 6	Tennessee	5th	American	Charles Ready	6,151	51.25 / 100	**Re-elected**
1857	August 6	Tennessee	7th	American	D. E. McElrath	1,665	16.19 / 100	2nd
1857	August 6	Tennessee	8th	American	Felix Zollicoffer	6,088	52.18 / 100	**Re-elected**
1857	August 6	Tennessee	9th	American	Emerson Etheridge	8,466	49.63 / 100	Lost re-election 2nd
1857	August 6	Tennessee	10th	American	William H. Stevens	5,697	48.68 / 100	2nd
1857	October 5	Georgia	1st	American	Francis S. Bartow	5,082	44.39 / 100	2nd
1857	October 5	Georgia	2nd	American	Samuel C. Elam	6,365	43.94 / 100	2nd
1857	October 5	Georgia	3rd	American	Robert Pleasant Trippe	5,803	51.69 / 100	**Re-elected**
1857	October 5	Georgia	4th	American	M. M. Tidwell	6,939	46.42 / 100	2nd
1857	October 5	Georgia	5th	American	J. W. Hooper	5,686	36.15 / 100	2nd
1857	October 5	Georgia	6th	Independent Democrat	Simmons	5,958	43.46 / 100	2nd
1857	October 5	Georgia	7th	American	Joshua Hill	4,800	51.48 / 100	**Elected**
1857	October 5	Georgia	8th	American	Thomas W. Miller	3,870	42.9 / 100	2nd
1857	October 6	Mississippi	1st	American	James L. Alcorn	2,738	36.24 / 100	2nd
1857	October 6	Mississippi	2nd	American	Charles Clark	2,625	34.7 / 100	2nd
1857	October 6	Mississippi	4th	American	William A. Lake	5,130	44.97 / 100	Lost re-election 2nd
1857	November 3	Louisiana	1st	American	George Eustis Jr.	2,336	60.39 / 100	**Re-elected**
1857	November 3	Louisiana	2nd	American	Glendy Burke	4,892	49.71 / 100	2nd
1857	November 3	Louisiana	3rd	American	George W. Watterson	3,512	35.38 / 100	2nd
1857	November 3	Louisiana	3rd	Independent Democrat	Laurent J. Sigur	2,145	21.61 / 100	3rd
1857	November 3	Louisiana	4th	American	W. H. Sparks	5,205	36.48 / 100	2nd
1857	November 4	Maryland	1st	American	Teagle Townsend	6,165	49.3 / 100	2nd
1857	November 4	Maryland	2nd	American	James Barroll Ricaud	8,751	52.42 / 100	**Re-elected**
1857	November 4	Maryland	3rd	American	James Morrison Harris	8,761	61.63 / 100	**Re-elected**
1857	November 4	Maryland	4th	American	Henry Winter Davis	10,515	72.55 / 100	**Re-elected**
1857	November 4	Maryland	5th	American	Henry William Hoffman	8,208	49.49 / 100	Lost re-election 2nd
1857	November 4	Maryland	6th	American	William J. Blackstone	4,837	43.99 / 100	2nd

== 1858–1859 ==
Notable third-party House performances (1858–1859) – 143 entries - 60 victories
Year	Date	State	District	Party	Candidate	# Votes	% Votes	Place
1858	August 2	Arkansas	1st	American	W. A. Crosby	2,853	13.52 / 100	2nd
1858	August 2	Arkansas	2nd	Independent Democrat	Thomas Stevenson Drew	3,452	15.1 / 100	2nd
1858	August 2	Arkansas	2nd	American	James A. Jones	3,104	13.58 / 100	3rd
1858	August 2	Missouri	1st	American	Samuel Miller Breckinridge	5,668	29.28 / 100	3rd
1858	August 2	Missouri	2nd	Independent Democrat	Thomas Lilbourne Anderson	10,502	63.3 / 100	**Re-elected as Independent Democrat**
1858	August 2	Missouri	4th	American	James H. Adams	7,824	38.61 / 100	2nd
1858	August 2	Missouri	5th	American	Samuel H. Woodson	7,942	46.92 / 100	**Re-elected**
1858	August 2	Missouri	5th	Unionist Democrat	George R. Smith	2,038	12.04 / 100	3rd
1858	August 2	Missouri	6th	American	John M. Richardson	8,050	37.49 / 100	2nd
1858	August 2	Missouri	7th	Independent	C. C. Zeigler	5,808	37.49 / 100	2nd
1858	October 4	Florida	At-large	Independent Democrat	John Westcott	3,661	37.57 / 100	2nd
1858	October 11	South Carolina	2nd	Unknown	James Gadsden	649	23.8 / 100	2nd
1858	October 11	South Carolina	5th	Unknown	Thomas O. Vernon	4,924	40.6 / 100	2nd
1858	October 12	Indiana	3rd	Anti-Lecompton Democrat	George W. Carr	1,432	7.47 / 100	3rd
1858	October 12	Indiana	7th	Anti-Lecompton Democrat	John G. Davis	10,893	58.95 / 100	**Re-elected as Anti-Lecompton Democrat**
1858	October 12	Pennsylvania	1st	People's (Note: Virtually identical to the Union slate that ran in 1856, it was a coalition of Republicans, Americans, Whigs and Democrats who were opposed to the Lecompton Constitution, in opposition to the local Democratic Party that had largely endorsed it, in an effort to prevent vote splitting between those parties involved.)	John W. Ryan	6,492	41.0 / 100	2nd
1858	October 12	Pennsylvania	1st	Anti-Lecompton Democrat	G. W. Nebinger	2,442	15.42 / 100	3rd
1858	October 12	Pennsylvania	2nd	People's	Edward Joy Morris	5,653	58.38 / 100	**Re-elected as People's**
1858	October 12	Pennsylvania	3rd	People's	John Paul Verree	6,977	54.24 / 100	2nd
1858	October 12	Pennsylvania	4th	People's	William Millward	9,749	59.25 / 100	**Re-elected as People's**
1858	October 12	Pennsylvania	5th	People's	John Wood	9,701	57.37 / 100	**Elected**
1858	October 12	Pennsylvania	6th	Anti-Lecompton Democrat	John Hickman	6,786	40.76 / 100	**Re-elected as Anti-Lecompton Democrat**
1858	October 12	Pennsylvania	6th	Lecompton Democrat	Charles D. Manly	5,185	31.15 / 100	2nd
1858	October 12	Pennsylvania	6th	People's	John Martin Broomall	4,676	28.09 / 100	3rd
1858	October 12	Pennsylvania	7th	People's	Henry Clay Longnecker	8,325	50.76 / 100	**Elected**
1858	October 12	Pennsylvania	8th	Anti-Lecompton Democrat	John Schwartz	7,321	50.07 / 100	**Elected**
1858	October 12	Pennsylvania	8th	Lecompton Democrat	Jehu Glancy Jones	7,302	49.94 / 100	Lost re-election as Lecompton Democrat; 2nd
1858	October 12	Pennsylvania	9th	People's	Thaddeus Stevens	9,513	60.0 / 100	**Elected**
1858	October 12	Pennsylvania	10th	People's	John Weinland Killinger	8,900	61.46 / 100	**Elected**
1858	October 12	Pennsylvania	11th	People's	James Hepburn Campbell	7,153	47.2 / 100	**Elected**
1858	October 12	Pennsylvania	11th	Lecompton Democrat	William Lewis Dewart	4,387	28.95 / 100	Lost re-election as Lecompton Democrat; 2nd
1858	October 12	Pennsylvania	11th	Anti-Lecompton Democrat	Joseph W. Cake	3,614	23.85 / 100	3rd
1858	October 12	Pennsylvania	12th	People's	George W. Scranton	10,043	61.89 / 100	**Elected**
1858	October 12	Pennsylvania	13th	People's	David K. Shoemaker	6,566	45.05 / 100	2nd
1858	October 12	Pennsylvania	14th	People's	Galusha A. Grow	11,165	76.87 / 100	**Re-elected as People's**
1858	October 12	Pennsylvania	15th	People's	James Tracy Hale	9,238	55.69 / 100	**Elected**
1858	October 12	Pennsylvania	16th	People's	Benjamin Franklin Junkin	8,646	50.13 / 100	**Elected**
1858	October 12	Pennsylvania	17th	People's	Edward McPherson	9,348	50.72 / 100	**Elected**
1858	October 12	Pennsylvania	18th	People's	Samuel Steel Blair	9,114	57.71 / 100	**Elected**
1858	October 12	Pennsylvania	19th	People's	John Covode	9,149	52.81 / 100	**Re-elected as People's**
1858	October 12	Pennsylvania	20th	People's	Jonathan Knight	5,794	38.5 / 100	2nd
1858	October 12	Pennsylvania	21st	People's	James K. Moorhead	6,539	57.27 / 100	**Elected**
1858	October 12	Pennsylvania	22nd	People's	Robert McKnight	5,438	55.25 / 100	**Elected**
1858	October 12	Pennsylvania	22nd	Anti-Tax	Thomas Williams	3,903	39.65 / 100	2nd
1858	October 12	Pennsylvania	23rd	People's	William Stewart	6,721	64.02 / 100	**Re-elected as People's**
1858	October 12	Pennsylvania	24th	People's	Chapin Hall	9,012	52.42 / 100	**Elected**
1858	October 12	Pennsylvania	25th	People's	Elijah Babbitt	6,360	60.73 / 100	**Elected**
1858	November 2	Delaware	At-large	People's (Note: Similar to the Pennsylvania People's slate, it was a coalition of Republicans, Americans, Whigs and Democrats who were opposed to the Lecompton Constitution, in opposition to the local Democratic Party that had largely endorsed it, in an effort to prevent vote splitting between those parties involved.)	William H. Morris	7,452	48.64 / 100	2nd
1858	November 2	Massachusetts	3rd	American	Moses G. Cobb	1,462	12.32 / 100	3rd
1858	November 2	Massachusetts	4th	American	Newell Thompson	1,396	14.83 / 100	3rd
1858	November 2	Massachusetts	7th	American	Elihu Baker	810	6.86 / 100	3rd
1858	November 2	Massachusetts	8th	American	Josiah H. Temple	576	5.47 / 100	3rd
1858	November 2	New Jersey	1st	American	John T. Jones	3,739	21.4 / 100	3rd
1858	November 2	New Jersey	3rd	Anti-Lecompton Democrat	Garnett Adrain	9,713	51.21 / 100	**Re-elected as Anti-Lecompton Democrat**
1858	November 2	New Jersey	4th	Anti-Lecompton Democrat	Jetur R. Riggs	8,837	52.01 / 100	**Elected**
1858	November 2	New York	2nd	Independent	Edward C. Littlefield	5,531	31.5 / 100	2nd
1858	November 2	New York	2nd	American	Edward T. Backhouse	974	5.55 / 100	4th
1858	November 2	New York	3rd	Anti-Administration Democrat (Note: Like Anti-Lecompton Democrats, Anti-Administration Democrats were those generally opposed to the adopted policy of the national Democratic Party as well as the Buchanan Presidency.)	Hiram Walbridge	2,874	31.7 / 100	3rd
1858	November 2	New York	4th	Independent Democrat	Thomas J. Barr	3,949	39.78 / 100	**Elected**
1858	November 2	New York	4th	Independent	Thomas Stephens	2,671	26.91 / 100	2nd
1858	November 2	New York	5th	American	Gilbert Dean	821	7.09 / 100	3rd
1858	November 2	New York	8th	Anti-Administration Democrat	Horace F. Clark	9,035	58.77 / 100	**Re-elected as Anti-Administration Democrat**
1858	November 2	New York	9th	Anti-Administration Democrat	John B. Haskin	7,637	48.32 / 100	**Re-elected as Anti-Administration Democrat**
1858	November 2	New York	10th	American	J. D. Friend	1,587	11.5 / 100	3rd
1858	November 2	New York	14th	Anti-Administration Democrat	John Hazard Reynolds	9,571	52.58 / 100	**Elected**
1858	November 2	New York	16th	American	Charles M. Watson	1,589	10.79 / 100	3rd
1858	November 2	New York	22nd	American	Albertus Perry	1,065	5.34 / 100	3rd
1858	November 2	New York	23rd	Independent	Caleb Lyon	7,177	43.93 / 100	2nd
1858	November 2	New York	25th	American	William H. Sisson	1,631	9.12 / 100	3rd
1858	November 2	New York	28th	American	Goldsmith Dennison	1,651	9.38 / 100	3rd
1858	November 2	New York	29th	American	James L. Angle	1,393	10.11 / 100	3rd
1858	November 2	New York	30th	American	James W. Black	2,264	12.91 / 100	3rd
1858	November 2	New York	31st	American	John H. White	2,132	18.38 / 100	3rd
1858	November 2	New York	33rd	American	William S. Johnson	1,886	11.28 / 100	3rd
1859	May 26	Virginia	2nd	Independent	Pretlow	1,372	29.52 / 100	2nd
1859	May 26	Virginia	2nd	Independent	Chandler	235	5.06 / 100	3rd
1859	May 26	Virginia	3rd	Independent Democrat	Daniel Coleman DeJarnette Sr.	5,581	50.45 / 100	**Elected**
1859	May 26	Virginia	5th	Unknown	Speed	226	9.87 / 100	2nd
1859	May 26	Virginia	6th	Independent Democrat	Shelton Leake	5,003	59.17 / 100	**Elected**
1859	May 26	Virginia	7th	Independent Democrat	Henry W. Thomas	5,139	46.47 / 100	2nd
1859	May 26	Virginia	8th	Opposition	Alexander Boteler	6,619	50.65 / 100	**Elected**
1859	May 26	Virginia	9th	Independent Democrat	John T. Harris	5,345	52.17 / 100	**Elected**
1859	May 26	Virginia	10th	Unknown	Berkshire	1,718	38.9 / 100	2nd
1859	May 26	Virginia	11th	Opposition	J. M. Laidley	7,228	44.44 / 100	2nd
1859	May 26	Virginia	13th	Independent Democrat	Elbert S. Martin	6,382	53.36 / 100	**Elected**
1859	August 1	Alabama	1st	Opposition	F. B. Shepard	4,258	36.68 / 100	2nd
1859	August 1	Alabama	2nd	Opposition	J. E. Sappington	615	18.88 / 100	2nd
1859	August 1	Alabama	3rd	Opposition	Thomas J. Judge	6,666	49.21 / 100	2nd
1859	August 1	Alabama	5th	Independent Democrat	William A. Hewlett	4,298	41.88 / 100	2nd
1859	August 1	Kentucky	1st	Opposition	William Morrow	2,248	16.3 / 100	2nd
1859	August 1	Kentucky	2nd	Opposition	James S. Jackson	7,199	47.56 / 100	2nd
1859	August 1	Kentucky	3rd	Opposition	Francis Bristow	7,164	56.24 / 100	**Elected**
1859	August 1	Kentucky	4th	American	William Clayton Anderson	7,204	50.01 / 100	**Elected**
1859	August 1	Kentucky	5th	Opposition	Joshua Jewett	5,066	42.24 / 100	Lost re-election as Opposition; 2nd
1859	August 1	Kentucky	6th	Opposition	Green Adams	8,164	53.03 / 100	**Elected**
1859	August 1	Kentucky	7th	Opposition	Robert Mallory	6,416	52.67 / 100	**Elected**
1859	August 1	Kentucky	8th	Opposition	John Marshall Harlan	6,865	49.76 / 100	2nd
1859	August 1	Kentucky	9th	Opposition	Laban T. Moore	8,505	50.83 / 100	**Elected**
1859	August 1	Kentucky	10th	Opposition	Thomas Laurens Jones	5,839	38.58 / 100	2nd
1859	August 1	Texas	1st	Independent	William Beck Ochiltree	2,858	10.79 / 100	2nd
1859	August 1	Texas	2nd	Independent Democrat	Andrew Jackson Hamilton	16,316	51.18 / 100	**Elected**
1859	August 4	North Carolina	1st	Independent Democrat	William N. H. Smith	6,045	52.22 / 100	**Elected**
1859	August 4	North Carolina	3rd	Independent Democrat	Malcolm J. McDuffie	1,284	21.2 / 100	2nd
1859	August 4	North Carolina	4th	Independent Democrat	Linn B. Sanders	2,446	29.79 / 100	2nd
1859	August 4	North Carolina	5th	American	John Adams Gilmer	6,361	58.07 / 100	**Re-elected**
1859	August 4	North Carolina	6th	American	James Madison Leach	8,566	52.78 / 100	**Elected**
1859	August 4	North Carolina	7th	Independent Democrat	Samuel H. Walkup	4,075	42.58 / 100	2nd
1859	August 4	North Carolina	8th	American	Zebulon Baird Vance	8,006	55.84 / 100	**Re-elected**
1859	August 4	Tennessee	1st	Opposition	Thomas Amos Rogers Nelson	9,060	50.19 / 100	**Elected**
1859	August 4	Tennessee	1st	Opposition	Horace Maynard	6,940	55.01 / 100	**Re-elected as Opposition**
1859	August 4	Tennessee	3rd	Opposition	Reese Bowen Brabson	8,374	50.19 / 100	**Elected**
1859	August 4	Tennessee	4th	Opposition	William Brickly Stokes	6,633	51.85 / 100	**Elected**
1859	August 4	Tennessee	5th	Opposition	Robert H. Hatton	6,719	53.48 / 100	**Elected**
1859	August 4	Tennessee	5th	Independent	Charles Ready	5,844	46.52 / 100	Lost re-election as Independent; 2nd
1859	August 4	Tennessee	7th	Opposition	Theodore H. Gibbs	2,711	22.42 / 100	2nd
1859	August 4	Tennessee	8th	Opposition	James Minor Quarles	6,994	52.87 / 100	**Elected**
1859	August 4	Tennessee	9th	Opposition	Emerson Etheridge	9,437	50.02 / 100	**Elected**
1859	August 4	Tennessee	10th	Opposition	John L. Sneed	5,648	47.71 / 100	2nd
1859	September 3	California	At-Large (2)	Lecompton Democrat	John Chilton Burch	57,508	28.44 / 100	**Elected**
1859	September 3	California	At-Large (2)	Lecompton Democrat	Charles L. Scott	56,509	27.95 / 100	**Re-elected as Lecompton Democrat**
1859	September 3	California	At-Large (2)	Anti-Lecompton Democrat	Joseph C. McKibbin	43,484	21.5 / 100	Lost re-election as Anti-Lecompton Democrat; 3rd
1859	October 3	Georgia	1st	Opposition	Alexander T. McIntyre	3,881	34.97 / 100	2nd
1859	October 3	Georgia	2nd	Opposition	Marcellus Douglas	6,437	42.54 / 100	2nd
1859	October 3	Georgia	3rd	Opposition	Thomas Hardeman Jr.	5,636	50.69 / 100	**Elected**
1859	October 3	Georgia	4th	Opposition	William F. Wright	6,053	40.54 / 100	2nd
1859	October 3	Georgia	5th	Independent	J. H. Shackleford	2,162	14.91 / 100	2nd
1859	October 3	Georgia	6th	Independent	A. T. Lytle	3,251	25.21 / 100	2nd
1859	October 3	Georgia	7th	Opposition	Joshua Hill	4,492	50.79 / 100	**Re-elected as Opposition**
1859	October 3	Georgia	8th	Opposition	Ambrose R. Wright	4,507	47.85 / 100	2nd
1859	October 3	Mississippi	1st	Opposition	G. Q. Martin	445	5.51 / 100	2nd
1859	October 3	Mississippi	1st	Unionist Democrat	Franklin Smith	2,376	22.81 / 100	2nd
1859	November 7	Louisiana	1st	American	John Edward Bouligny	2,215	49.55 / 100	**Elected**
1859	November 7	Louisiana	1st	States Rights	Charles Bienvenu	459	10.27 / 100	3rd
1859	November 7	Louisiana	2nd	American	L. D. Nichols	4,459	43.01 / 100	2nd
1859	November 7	Louisiana	3rd	American	T. Cannon	801	10.75 / 100	2nd
1859	November 7	Louisiana	4th	American	M. A. Jones	3,878	25.58 / 100	2nd
1859	November 8	Maryland	1st	American	Teagle Townsend	6,384	47.94 / 100	2nd
1859	November 8	Maryland	2nd	American	Edwin Hanson Webster	9,237	52.03 / 100	**Elected**
1859	November 8	Maryland	3rd	American	James Morrison Harris	9,612	69.47 / 100	**Re-elected**
1859	November 8	Maryland	4th	American	Henry Winter Davis	10,068	78.27 / 100	**Re-elected**
1859	November 8	Maryland	4th	Independent	William G. Harrison	2,796	21.74 / 100	2nd
1859	November 8	Maryland	5th	American	Henry William Hoffman	8,716	49.62 / 100	2nd
1859	November 8	Maryland	6th	American	Alexander Burton Hagner	5,353	45.79 / 100	2nd

== 1878 ==
Notable third-party House performances (1878) – 68 entries – 4 victories
Year	District	Party	Candidate	# Votes	% Votes	Place
1878	Alabama 1	Greenback	Warner Bailey	2,941	30.90 / 100	2nd
1878	Alabama 3	Independent	French Strange	676	9.64 / 100	2nd
1878	Alabama 5	Greenback	Theodore Nunn	2,734	29.49 / 100	2nd
1878	Alabama 8	Greenback	William M. Lowe	10,323	55.49 / 100	**Elected**
1878	Arkansas 2	Greenback	John G. Bradley	8,399	42.80 / 100	2nd
1878	Delaware at-large	Greenback	John G. Jackson	2,966	21.90 / 100	2nd
1878	Iowa 3	Greenback	S. T. Spangler	5,406	18.63 / 100	3rd
1878	Iowa 4	Greenback	Luman H. Weller	5,742	20.38 / 100	2nd
1878	Iowa 8	Greenback	George C. Hieks	7,760	25.40 / 100	2nd
1878	Iowa 9	Greenback	L. Q. Hoggatt	12,338	41.09 / 100	2nd
1878	Illinois 3	Independent	Benjamin Sibley	2,306	12.78 / 100	3rd
1878	Illinois 5	Greenback	John M. King	4,804	23.24 / 100	3rd
1878	Illinois 7	Greenback	Alexander Campbell	6,512	28.29 / 100	2nd
1878	Illinois 8	Greenback	Chris C. Strawn	6,575	29.01 / 100	2nd
1878	Illinois 9	Greenback	Alexander H. McKeighan	3,749	15.56 / 100	3rd
1878	Illinois 10	Greenback	Alson Jessup Streeter	3,496	13.17 / 100	3rd
1878	Illinois 11	Greenback	William H. Pogue	3,034	13.82 / 100	3rd
1878	Illinois 12	Greenback	John Mathers	4,611	17.53 / 100	3rd
1878	Illinois 14	Greenback	Jesse Harper	4,451	15.00 / 100	3rd
1878	Illinois 16	Greenback	Jesse Harper	2,139	9.07 / 100	3rd
1878	Illinois 17	Greenback	William E. Moberly	1,598	6.49 / 100	3rd
1878	Illinois 18	Greenback	S. J. Davis	2,454	9.02 / 100	3rd
1878	Indiana 2	Greenback	William L. Green	2,103	6.69 / 100	3rd
1878	Indiana 3	Greenback	John F. Willy	1,588	6.10 / 100	3rd
1878	Indiana 6	Greenback	Reuben A. Riley	2,044	6.06 / 100	3rd
1878	Indiana 7	Greenback	Gilbert De La Matyr	18,720	51.15 / 100	**Elected**
1878	Indiana 8	Greenback	Henry A. White	6,929	21.51 / 100	3rd
1878	Indiana 11	Greenback	David Moss	3,866	11.89 / 100	3rd
1878	Indiana 13	Greenback	William C. Williams	3,462	10.76 / 100	3rd
1878	Kansas 1	Greenback	E. Gale	5,716	11.19 / 100	3rd
1878	Kansas 2	Greenback	P. P. Elder	9,962	23.54 / 100	3rd
1878	Kansas 3	Greenback	F. Doster	11,055	24.90 / 100	2nd
1878	Louisiana 3	Independent Democrat	W. B. Merchant	3,666	17.34 / 100	3rd
1878	Maine 4	Greenback	George W. Ladd	12,921	56.14 / 100	**Elected**
1878	Massachusetts 7	Greenback	Samuel M. Stevens	2,831	11.87 / 100	3rd
1878	Maryland 6	Greenback	Horace Resley	1,907	6.69 / 100	2nd
1878	Mississippi 1	Greenback	Reuben Davis	6,533	5.27 / 100	2nd
1878	Missouri 5	Greenback	J. J. Ware	8,022	40.25 / 100	3rd
1878	Missouri 9	Greenback	Nicholas Ford	17,430	51.68 / 100	**Elected**
1878	Missouri 10	Greenback	E. J. Broaddus	5,682	18.12 / 100	3rd
1878	New Hampshire 2	Greenback	Cyrus A. Sulloway	2,075	8.33 / 100	3rd
1878	New Hampshire 3	Greenback	James W. Johnson	1,496	6.27 / 100	3rd
1878	New Jersey 1	Greenback	C. C. Grosscup	9,879	31.85 / 100	2nd
1878	New Jersey 3	Greenback	Washington Hope	3,843	12.56 / 100	3rd
1878	New Jersey 4	Greenback	George H. Larison	4,111	16.18 / 100	3rd
1878	New Jersey 5	Greenback	Erastus Potter	3,268	13.48 / 100	3rd
1878	New York 1	Greenback	Samuel J. Crooks	1,430	5.27 / 100	3rd
1878	New York 12	Greenback	Nicholas Smith	2,421	10.60 / 100	3rd
1878	New York 14	Greenback	William Voorhis	3,261	12.22 / 100	3rd
1878	New York 15	Greenback	John R. Erkson	3,524	12.24 / 100	3rd
1878	New York 20	Greenback	Frederick F. Wendell	2,588	8.27 / 100	3rd
1878	New York 26	Greenback	Martin L. Walley	1,638	6.05 / 100	3rd
1878	New York 28	Greenback	Epenetus Howe	1,883	6.53 / 100	3rd
1878	New York 29	Greenback	Ralph Beaumont	8,174	24.43 / 100	3rd
1878	New York 33	Greenback	Silas Vinton	4,689	20.58 / 100	3rd
1878	Ohio 5	Greenback	Stephen Johnson	2,392	7.91 / 100	3rd
1878	Ohio 6	Greenback	William C. Holgate	2,544	8.28 / 100	3rd
1878	Ohio 13	Greenback	George E. Geddes	1,487	5.81 / 100	3rd
1878	Ohio 14	Greenback	Thomas J. McGinnis	2,491	8.62 / 100	3rd
1878	Pennsylvania 10	Greenback	A. Brower Longaker	7,329	25.77 / 100	2nd
1878	Pennsylvania 13	Greenback	Charles N. Brumm	7,128	35.38 / 100	2nd
1878	Pennsylvania 15	Greenback	DeWitt C. DeWitt	9,320	34.85 / 100	2nd
1878	Pennsylvania 16	Greenback	T.F. Davis	10,163	37.44 / 100	2nd
1878	Rhode Island 1	Greenback	Lycurgus Sayles	575	7.30 / 100	3rd
1878	Virginia 5	Independent	William A. Witcher	4,267	33.31 / 100	2nd
1878	West Virginia 1	Greenback	James Bassell	4,087	12.62 / 100	3rd
1878	Wisconsin 2	Greenback	Horace A. Tenney	2,376	9.70 / 100	3rd
1878	Wisconsin 4	Greenback	Truman H. Judd	1,351	5.74 / 100	3rd

== 1894 ==
Notable third-party House performances (1894) – 68 entries – 1 victory
Year	District	Party	Candidate	# Votes	% Votes	Place
1894	Alabama 1	Populist	Guy C. Sibley	1,898	23.11 / 100	2nd
1894	Alabama 2	Populist	John D. Gardner	5,324	35.37 / 100	2nd
1894	Alabama 6	Populist	John B. Sanford	2,622	25.56 / 100	2nd
1894	Alabama 7	Populist	Milford W. Howard	6,838	66.45 / 100	**Elected**
1894	Alabama 8	Populist	Lee Crandall	6,474	42.11 / 100	2nd
1894	Arkansas 1	Populist	Russ Coffman	1,299	17.74 / 100	2nd of 2
1894	Arkansas 4	Populist	J.H. Cherry	1,557	15.39 / 100	3rd
1894	Arkansas 5	Populist	W.M. Peel	759	5.72 / 100	3rd
1894	California 1	Populist	Roger F. Grigsby	7,246	19.74 / 100	3rd
1894	California 2	Populist	Burdell Cornell	8,946	19.95 / 100	3rd
1894	California 3	Populist	W.A. Vann	5,162	14.88 / 100	3rd
1894	California 4	Populist	B.K. Collier	5,627	18.42 / 100	3rd
1894	California 7	Populist	B.K. Collier	10,719	24.97 / 100	3rd
1894	Florida 1	Populist	D.L. McKinnon	2,135	14.69 / 100	2nd
1894	Florida 2	Populist	Montholom Atkinson	2,334	20.19 / 100	2nd
1894	Georgia 1	Populist	George H. Miller	2,672	16.52 / 100	3rd
1894	Georgia 5	Populist	Robert Todd	5,042	40.54 / 100	2nd
1894	Georgia 6	Populist	W.S. Whitaker	6,045	34.24 / 100	2nd
1894	Georgia 7	Populist	William H. Felton	4,256	21.21 / 100	3rd
1894	Georgia 8	Populist	W.T. Carter	7,433	41.25 / 100	2nd
1894	Iowa 1	Populist	J.O. Beebe	2,065	6.09 / 100	3rd
1894	Kansas 2	Populist	F. A. Willard	13,811	32.70 / 100	2nd
1894	Kansas 4	Populist	S. M. Scott	18,790	39.82 / 100	2nd
1894	Louisiana 4	Populist	B. W. Bailey	5,932	32.61 / 100	2nd
1894	Louisiana 6	Populist	M. R. Wilson	2,230	21.84 / 100	2nd
1894	Maine 2	Populist	Elbert Y. Turner	1,693	5.96 / 100	3rd
1894	Maine 3	Populist	George C. Sheldon	1,986	7.62 / 100	3rd
1894	Michigan 4	Populist	Sullivan W. Cook	3,744	10.14 / 100	3rd
1894	Michigan 12	Populist	Andrew E. Anderson	3,076	9.40 / 100	3rd
1894	Mississippi 1	Populist	J. A. Brown	843	20.97 / 100	2nd
1894	Mississippi 2	Populist	R. J. Lyle	1,067	20.90 / 100	2nd
1894	Mississippi 4	Populist	J.H. Jamison	3,751	41.65 / 100	2nd
1894	Mississippi 5	Populist	W.P. Ratliff	2,873	33.73 / 100	2nd
1894	Mississippi 6	Populist	A.C. Hathorn	2,638	25.66 / 100	2nd
1894	Mississippi 7	Populist	A.M. Newman	1,355	26.44 / 100	2nd
1894	Nebraska 2	Populist	D. Clem Deaver	3,962	15.56 / 100	3rd
1894	Nebraska 3	Populist	John M. Devine	11,738	31.61 / 100	2nd
1894	New Jersey 5	Socialist Labor	Frederick W. Ball	2,511	8.38 / 100	3rd
1894	New York 11	Socialist Labor	Francis H. Koenig	1,448	6.19 / 100	3rd
1894	North Carolina 2	Populist	Howard F. Freeman	5,314	18.03 / 100	3rd
1894	North Carolina 3	Populist	Cyrus Thompson	9,705	35.46 / 100	2nd
1894	Ohio 4	Populist	Joseph White	2,323	7.12 / 100	3rd
1894	Ohio 5	Populist	Henry L. Goll	2,015	6.02 / 100	3rd
1894	Ohio 9	Populist	George Candee	2,964	7.84 / 100	3rd
1894	Ohio 11	Populist	William A. Crawford	3,115	8.55 / 100	3rd
1894	Ohio 17	Populist	William F. Lloyd	2,268	5.80 / 100	3rd
1894	Tennessee 1	Prohibition	R. S. Cheves	2,662	9.11 / 100	3rd
1894	Tennessee 3	Prohibition	Frank P. Dickey	1,669	5.11 / 100	3rd
1894	Tennessee 5	Populist	W. W. Erwin	9,543	44.80 / 100	2nd
1894	Tennessee 6	Populist	W. W. Erwin	4,783	22.98 / 100	3rd
1894	Tennessee 9	Populist	Atwood Pierson	7,983	42.88 / 100	2nd
1894	Tennessee 10	Populist	R. J. Rawlings	1,454	14.45 / 100	3rd
1894	Texas 1	Populist	J.J. Burroughs	10,037	37.01 / 100	2nd
1894	Texas 2	Populist	B.A. Calhoun	16,025	40.73 / 100	2nd
1894	Texas 3	Populist	J.M. Perdue	12,411	44.53 / 100	2nd
1894	Texas 4	Populist	James H. Davis	13,703	36.68 / 100	2nd
1894	Texas 6	Populist	J.M. Perdue	19,621	48.38 / 100	2nd
1894	Texas 7	Populist	I.N. Barber	17,092	47.59 / 100	2nd
1894	Texas 8	Populist	C.H. Jenkins	16,104	49.42 / 100	2nd
1894	Texas 9	Populist	W.O. Hutchinson	16,591	47.33 / 100	2nd
1894	Texas 10	Populist	J.C. McBride	7,847	25.40 / 100	3rd
1894	Texas 12	Populist	A.V. Gates	4,545	16.50 / 100	3rd
1894	Texas 13	Populist	D.B. Gilliland	13,321	38.75 / 100	2nd
1894	Virginia 3	Populist	James M. Gregory	1,788	9.64 / 100	3rd
1894	Virginia 4	Populist	J. Haskins Hobson	1,116	6.11 / 100	3rd
1894	Virginia 6	Populist	O. C. Rucker	3,550	15.78 / 100	3rd
1894	Wisconsin 1	Populist	Hamilton Utley	2,828	7.30 / 100	3rd
1894	Wyoming at-large	Populist	Shakespeare E. Sealey	2,906	15.19 / 100	3rd

== 1896 ==
Notable third-party House performances (1896) – 25 entries
Year	District	Party	Candidate	# Votes	% Votes	Place
1896	Alabama 2	Populist	John C. Fonville	3,856	18.43 / 100	3rd
1896	Alabama 6	Populist	George S. Youngblood	3,295	17.88 / 100	3rd
1896	Colorado 1	Populist	Lafayette Pence	34,223	39.68 / 100	2nd
1896	Georgia 1	Populist	George H. Miller	2,672	16.25 / 100	2nd
1896	Georgia 2	Populist	John A. Sibley	3,035	21.14 / 100	2nd
1896	Georgia 6	Populist	A.A. Murphy	4,696	36.31 / 100	2nd
1896	Georgia 7	Populist	J.W. McGarrity	4,256	21.21 / 100	2nd
1896	Georgia 8	Populist	G.L. Anderson	2,962	20.08 / 100	2nd
1896	Georgia 10	Populist	John T. West	7,105	41.25 / 100	2nd
1896	Mississippi 1	Populist	A. W. Kearley	752	9.05 / 100	2nd
1896	Mississippi 2	Populist	R.J. Lyle	1,087	20.90 / 100	2nd
1896	Mississippi 4	Populist	R.K. Prewitt	3,086	25.85 / 100	2nd
1896	Mississippi 5	Populist	W.P. Ratliff	2,873	33.73 / 100	2nd
1896	Mississippi 6	Populist	A.C. Hathorn	2,683	25.66 / 100	2nd
1896	Mississippi 7	Populist	G.M. Cain	897	10.37 / 100	2nd
1896	New York 11	Socialist Labor	Herman Miller	2,011	8.05 / 100	3rd
1896	Texas 1	Populist	Joe H. Eagle	15,189	44.02 / 100	2nd
1896	Texas 3	Populist	W.E. Farmer	16,351	43.53 / 100	2nd
1896	Texas 4	Populist	J.L. White	16,351	37.06 / 100	2nd
1896	Texas 6	Populist	Jerome C. Kearby	19,621	48.08 / 100	2nd
1896	Texas 7	Populist	W.F. Douthitt	11,632	24.53 / 100	2nd
1896	Texas 8	Populist	C.H. Jenkins	17,510	44.68 / 100	2nd
1896	Texas 9	Populist	Reddin Andrews	6,787	17.13 / 100	3rd
1896	Texas 12	Populist	Taylor McRae	3,730	10.65 / 100	3rd
1896	Utah's at-large	Populist	Andrew Bowen	27,813	35.87 / 100	2nd

== 1898 ==
Notable third-party House performances (1898) – 13 entries
Year	District	Party	Candidate	# Votes	% Votes	Place
1898	Georgia 7	Populist	S.B. Austin	1,252	19.42 / 100	2nd
1898	Georgia 9	Populist	Jefferson P. Brooks	3,466	27.20 / 100	2nd
1898	New York 9	Socialist Labor	Lucien Sanial	2,396	11.65 / 100	3rd
1898	New York 11	Socialist Labor	Howard Balkam	2,310	10.10 / 100	3rd
1898	Rhode Island 1	Socialist Labor	Edward W. Theinert	1,117	5.43 / 100	3rd
1898	Rhode Island 2	Socialist Labor	Charles H. Dana	1,462	8.31 / 100	3rd
1898	Tennessee 6	Prohibition	N. P. Gill	1,021	6.97 / 100	3rd
1898	Texas 3	Populist	H.D. Wood	9,169	33.75 / 100	2nd
1898	Texas 4	Populist	J.L. Whittle	10,709	37.06 / 100	2nd
1898	Texas 8	Populist	N.J. Shads	11,138	34.85 / 100	2nd
1898	Texas 12	Populist	A.B. Surber	2,110	7.24 / 100	3rd
1898	Virginia 2	Independent Republican	William S. Holland	3,445	15.78 / 100	3rd
1898	Virginia 8	Independent	Edward Hughes	616	8.45 / 100	2nd

== 1908–1909 ==
Notable third-party House performances (1908–1909) – 29 entries
Year	District	Party	Candidate	# Votes	% Votes	Place
1908	California 1	Socialist	D.N. Cunningham	2,898	7.61 / 100	3rd
1908	California 3	Socialist	Owen H. Philbrick	4,052	9.33 / 100	3rd
1908	California 5	Socialist	E. H. Misner	3,640	6.35 / 100	3rd
1908	California 8	Socialist	Noble A. Richardson	5,025	9.56 / 100	3rd
1908	Florida 1	Socialist	C.C. Allen	1,297	9.78 / 100	2nd
1908	Florida 2	Socialist	A.N. Jackson	862	6.10 / 100	2nd
1908	Idaho at-large	Socialist	Halbert Barton	6,248	6.66 / 100	3rd
1908	Illinois 5	Socialist	Morris Siskind	1,285	5.27 / 100	3rd
1908	Illinois 7	Socialist	George Koop	4,183	15.40 / 100	3rd
1908	Illinois 17	Prohibition	William P. Allin	2,228	5.39 / 100	3rd
1908	Massachusetts 2	Independence League	George W. Curtis	1,623	5.75 / 100	3rd
1908	Massachusetts 6	Socialist	Franklin H. Wentworth	2,418	7.59 / 100	3rd
1908	Massachusetts 13	Independence League	Charles W. Copeland	1,436	6.17 / 100	3rd
1908	Montana at-large	Socialist	Lewis J. Duncan	5,318	7.92 / 100	3rd
1908	New York 2	Independence League	Edward Walsh	1,886	6.57 / 100	3rd
1908	New York 7	Independence League	William T. Smith	1,841	6.06 / 100	3rd
1908	New York 9	Socialist	Morris Hillquit	2,483	21.56 / 100	2nd
1908	New York 10	Socialist	Morris Brown	1,754	9.00 / 100	3rd
1908	New York 11	Independence League	Alexander Porter	1,853	5.29 / 100	3rd
1908	New York 12	Independence League	James D. Bush	1,482	5.38 / 100	3rd
1908	New York 14	Socialist	Philip Schmitt	3,055	7.37 / 100	3rd
1908	New York 14	Independence League	Herbert Wade	2,485	6.00 / 100	4th
1908	New York 16	Socialist	John Parr	1,966	7.96 / 100	3rd
1908	New York 16	Independence League	Edwin D. Ackerman	1,334	5.40 / 100	4th
1908	Ohio 3	Independent	J. Eugene Harding	19,306	28.55 / 100	Lost re-election 2nd
1908	Ohio 9	Socialist	Charles H. Miller	3,285	5.38 / 100	3rd
1908	Oklahoma 1	Socialist	Winston T. Banks	2,827	5.47 / 100	3rd
1908	Oklahoma 2	Socialist	Charles P. Randall	4,443	7.93 / 100	3rd
1908	Oklahoma 4	Socialist	M.C. Carter	5,769	13.25 / 100	3rd
1908	Oklahoma 5	Socialist	W.D. Davis	5,478	9.84 / 100	3rd
1908	Wyoming at-large	Socialist	James Morgan	2,486	6.62 / 100	3rd
1909	Washington 2	Socialist	Emil Herman	1,396	5.69 / 100	3rd

== 1916 ==
Notable third-party House performances (1916) – 52 entries - 2 victories
Year	District	Party	Candidate	# Votes	% Votes	Place
1916	Arizona at-large	Socialist	J.R. Barnette	3,060	5.85 / 100	3rd
1916	California 3	Socialist	Ben Cooper	4,555	6.17 / 100	3rd
1916	California 4	Socialist	Allen K. Gifford	3,775	5.61 / 100	3rd
1916	California 6	Socialist	Luella Twining	7,558	8.67 / 100	3rd
1916	California 7		Harry M. Mckee	17,576	7.32 / 100	3rd
1916	California 7	Prohibition	J.F. Butler	4,042	5.32 / 100	4th
1916	Colorado 4	Socialist	Emery D. Cox	2,695	5.73 / 100	3rd
1916	Florida 1	Socialist	Frank L. Sullivan	1,158	6.20 / 100	3rd
1916	Florida 2	Prohibition	Frances P. Coffin	1,156	9.20 / 100	3rd
1916	Florida 4	Socialist	A.N. Jackson	1,592	7.44 / 100	3rd
1916	Illinois 5	Socialist	Charles Toepper	1,500	7.06 / 100	3rd
1916	Illinois 7	Socialist	Carl D. Thompson	8,372	8.97 / 100	3rd
1916	Louisiana 3	Progressive	Whitmell P. Martin	6,481	49.02 / 100	**Re-elected**
1916	Maryland 2	Prohibition	John S. Green	3,513	7.14 / 100	3rd
1916	Massachusetts 6	Socialist	Charles W. Fitzgerald	2,049	6.30 / 100	3rd
1916	Minnesota 7	Prohibition	Engebret E. Lobeck	11,961	30.07 / 100	2nd
1916	Nebraska 2	Socialist	G.C. Porter	2,922	6.34 / 100	3rd
1916	Nevada at-large	Socialist	Martin J. Scanlan	5,125	15.85 / 100	3rd
1916	New York 3	Socialist	William A. Ross	1,552	6.56 / 100	3rd
1916	New York 4	Socialist	Richard Haffner	2,451	13.33 / 100	3rd
1916	New York 5	Socialist	Hans A. Hansen	1,357	5.35 / 100	3rd
1916	New York 9	Socialist	Ludwig Lore	2,815	6.24 / 100	3rd
1916	New York 10	Socialist	William M. Feigenbaum	1,813	18.60 / 100	3rd
1916	New York 12	Socialist	Meyer London	6,103	47.42 / 100	**Elected**
1916	New York 13	Socialist	Hilda G. Claessens	1,813	15.46 / 100	3rd
1916	New York 14	Socialist	William I. Sockheim	1,813	15.09 / 100	3rd
1916	New York 18	Socialist	Irving Ottenberg	2,407	9.09 / 100	3rd
1916	New York 20	Socialist	Morris Hillquit	4,129	32.83 / 100	2nd
1916	New York 21	Socialist	Alexander Braunstein	1,434	5.40 / 100	3rd
1916	New York 22	Socialist	Max B. Gullah	2,244	6.70 / 100	3rd
1916	New York 23	Socialist	George Dobsevage	5,810	10.66 / 100	3rd
1916	New York 24	Socialist	Mary G. Schonberg	3,710	7.75 / 100	3rd
1916	New York 30	Socialist	Herbert M. Merrill	2,126	5.05 / 100	3rd
1916	Ohio 3	Socialist	Jeremiah F. Meuchner	4,699	6.69 / 100	3rd
1916	Ohio 9	Socialist	Thomas C. Devine	3,091	5.63 / 100	3rd
1916	Oklahoma 1	Socialist	J.H. Reese	3,671	9.17 / 100	3rd
1916	Oklahoma 2	Socialist	J.A. Lewis	3,511	12.15 / 100	3rd
1916	Oklahoma 3	Socialist	H.M. Shelton	6,862	17.86 / 100	3rd
1916	Oklahoma 4	Socialist	Allen C. Adams	8,026	20.32 / 100	3rd
1916	Oklahoma 5	Socialist	Robert L. Allen	5,294	14.69 / 100	3rd
1916	Oklahoma 6	Socialist	O.M. Morris	6,727	18.74 / 100	3rd
1916	Oklahoma 7	Socialist	H.H. Stallard	8,140	24.59 / 100	2nd
1916	Oklahoma 8	Socialist	Joseph Ottl	5,158	13.93 / 100	3rd
1916	Oregon 2	Socialist	James H. Barkley	6,028	14.14 / 100	2nd
1916	Pennsylvania 15	Socialist	Patrick A. McGowan	1,789	5.77 / 100	3rd
1916	Texas 3	Socialist	J.L. Scroggin	2,014	11.72 / 100	2nd
1916	Texas 4	Socialist	W.J. Lennon	1,460	6.86 / 100	3rd
1916	Texas 12	Socialist	Leeland G. Baker	1,517	6.45 / 100	3rd
1916	Texas 13	Socialist	J.A. Pressly	2,489	6.29 / 100	3rd
1916	Texas 16	Socialist	T.B. Holiday	2,826	7.95 / 100	2nd
1916	Wisconsin 4	Socialist	Winfield R. Gaylord	11,380	32.67 / 100	3rd
1916	Wisconsin 11	Socialist	Henry M. Parks	2,252	6.68 / 100	3rd

== 1920–1921 ==
Notable third-party House performances (1920–1921) – 110 entries - 2 victories
Year	District	Party	Candidate	# Votes	% Votes	Place
1920	California 1	Independent	C. A. Bodwell Jr.	18.569	33.3 / 100	2nd
1920	California 4	Socialist	Milton Harlan	9,289	15.45 / 100	2nd
1920	California 5	Socialist	Thomas Conway	10,952	17.89 / 100	2nd
1920	California 7	Socialist	Harry M. McKee	8,449	12.78 / 100	2nd
1920	California 9	Prohibition	Charles Hiram Randall	36,675	34.78 / 100	Lost re-election 2nd
1920	California 9	Socialist	Mary E. Garbutt	5,819	5.52 / 100	3rd
1920	California 10	Socialist	Upton Sinclair	20,439	17.34 / 100	2nd
1920	Idaho 1	Independent	Riley Rice	8,605	14.72 / 100	3rd
1920	Illinois 4	Socialist	Charles Baranek	2,753	5.79 / 100	3rd
1920	Illinois 5	Socialist	William Neumann	3,290	10.37 / 100	3rd
1920	Illinois 6	Socialist	William F. Kruse	9,937	7.12 / 100	3rd
1920	Illinois 7	Socialist	Samuel Holland	12,097	7.65 / 100	3rd
1920	Illinois 21	Farmer–Labor	Duncan McDonald	8,970	10.79 / 100	3rd
1920	Illinois 22	Farmer–Labor	C. J. Hayes	11,929	13.12 / 100	3rd
1920	Illinois 25	Farmer–Labor	John H. Reed	5,690	6.74 / 100	3rd
1920	Iowa 2	Farmer–Labor	F. B. Althouse	6,058	10.76 / 100	2nd
1920	Iowa 9	Independent	Hattie T. Harl	10,607	17.93 / 100	2nd
1920	Kentucky 6	Independent	Harry V. Dill	8,231	11.1 / 100	3rd
1920	Maryland 2	Independent	Samuel C. Appleby	5,679	6.87 / 100	3rd
1920	Maryland 4	Independent	Walter E. Knickman	8,417	11.12 / 100	3rd
1920	Massachusetts 7	Prohibition	George F. Hogan	5,121	8.71 / 100	3rd
1920	Massachusetts 8	Independent	John D. Lynch	7,407	9.96 / 100	3rd
1920	Massachusetts 12	Independent (Note: On ballot as "The People's Candidate.")	William H. O'Brien	4,813	8.64 / 100	3rd
1920	Massachusetts 16	Labor	George Richards	7,239	15.23 / 100	2nd
1920	Minnesota 1	Farmer–Labor	Julius J. Reiter	21,158	29.57 / 100	2nd
1920	Minnesota 2	Independent	H. A. Fuller	19,274	25.57 / 100	2nd
1920	Minnesota 3	Independent	R. A. Pomadt	14,034	19.81 / 100	3rd
1920	Minnesota 4	Independent	Carl W. Cummins	4,702	7.11 / 100	3rd
1920	Minnesota 5	Farmer–Labor	Lynn Thompson	22,584	23.65 / 100	2nd
1920	Minnesota 5	Independent	Ernest Lundeen	9,573	10.03 / 100	3rd
1920	Minnesota 6	Independent	Charles August Lindbergh	21,587	31.04 / 100	2nd
1920	Minnesota 7	Independent	Ole J. Kvale	35,370	45.61 / 100	2nd
1920	Minnesota 9	Independent	N. E. Thormodson	28,443	38.28 / 100	2nd
1920	Minnesota 10	Farmer–Labor	John G. Soltis	18,590	23.1 / 100	2nd
1920	Mississippi 4	Socialist	J. A. Washington	598	6.24 / 100	2nd
1920	Mississippi 6	Socialist	T. J. Lyon	610	5.45 / 100	3rd
1920	Nebraska 3	Independent	Marie Weekes	15,516	21.84 / 100	3rd
1920	Nebraska 6	Independent	Lucien Stebbins	6,222	8.17 / 100	3rd
1920	Nevada at-large	Independent	Paul Jones	3,349	12.46 / 100	3rd
1920	New Jersey 7	Socialist	Frank Hubschmidtt	2,939	5.6 / 100	3rd
1920	New York 2	Socialist	William Burke Sr.	5,872	6.58 / 100	3rd
1920	New York 3	Socialist	Harry W. Laidler	5,257	14.13 / 100	3rd
1920	New York 6	Socialist	William W. Passage	6,867	9.16 / 100	3rd
1920	New York 7	Socialist	Jean Jacques Coronel	6,561	14.89 / 100	3rd
1920	New York 8	Socialist	Victor H. Lawn	9,124	14.48 / 100	3rd
1920	New York 9	Socialist	Wilhelmus B. Robinson	7,420	9.34 / 100	3rd
1920	New York 10	Socialist	James Oneal	11,529	22.35 / 100	3rd
1920	New York 12	Socialist	Meyer London	10,212	54.13 / 100	**Elected**
1920	New York 13	Socialist	Charles W. Irvin	4,925	35.42 / 100	2nd
1920	New York 14	Socialist	Algernon Lee	8,443	31.73 / 100	2nd
1920	New York 16	Socialist	Bertha Mailly	2,748	7.56 / 100	3rd
1920	New York 18	Farmer–Labor	J. A. O'Leary	9,998	25.65 / 100	3rd
1920	New York 18	Socialist	Marie MacDonald	5,668	14.54 / 100	4th
1920	New York 19	Socialist	Esther Friedman	5,667	8.02 / 100	3rd
1920	New York 20	Socialist	Morris Hillquit	9,442	42.83 / 100	2nd
1920	New York 22	Socialist	Patrick J. Murphy	6,580	14.75 / 100	3rd
1920	New York 23	Socialist	Abraham Josephson	22,949	23.25 / 100	3rd
1920	New York 24	Socialist	George W. Orr	15,500	16.5 / 100	3rd
1920	New York 30	Socialist	Harry Christian	6,242	9.33 / 100	3rd
1920	New York 38	Socialist	Charles Messinger	8,369	9.72 / 100	3rd
1920	New York 39	Socialist	George Weber	3,943	5.28 / 100	3rd
1920	New York 40	Socialist	Augustus Meas	5,389	6.67 / 100	3rd
1920	New York 41	Socialist	Martin B. Heisler	4,836	8.62 / 100	3rd
1920	New York 42	Socialist	John H. Gibbons	3,218	6.8 / 100	3rd
1920	New York 43	Socialist	Gust C. Peterson	4,273	6.08 / 100	3rd
1920	North Dakota 1	Nonpartisan League	John Miller Baer	32,072	42.42 / 100	Lost re-election as Nonpartisan; 2nd
1920	North Dakota 2	Nonpartisan League	Ole H. Olson	32,618	48.35 / 100	2nd
1920	Oklahoma 3	Socialist	Robert L. Allen	4,227	6.84 / 100	3rd
1920	Oklahoma 4	Socialist	J. E. Bartos	3,438	5.31 / 100	3rd
1920	Oklahoma 6	Socialist	J. V. Kelachny	3,212	5.87 / 100	3rd
1920	Oklahoma 7	Socialist	Orville E. Enfield	4,251	9.81 / 100	3rd
1920	Oklahoma 8	Socialist	H. C. Geist	3,304	5.7 / 100	3rd
1920	Oregon 1	Socialist	Harlin Talbert	8,258	9.85 / 100	2nd
1920	Pennsylvania 1	Socialist	H. J. Nelson	3,509	6.02 / 100	3rd
1920	Pennsylvania 4	Socialist	L. L. Klein	2,969	5.22 / 100	3rd
1920	Pennsylvania 13	Socialist	Charles E. Yeager	6,245	8.31 / 100	3rd
1920	Pennsylvania 18	Labor	George A. Herring	4,110	6.16 / 100	3rd
1920	Pennsylvania 19	Socialist Labor	William T. Welsh	9,842	15.0 / 100	3rd
1920	Pennsylvania 22	Socialist	S. E. Miller	3,234	5.46 / 100	3rd
1920	Pennsylvania 25	Independent Republican	Milton William Shreve	19,706	43.04 / 100	**Re-elected as Ind. Republican**
1920	Pennsylvania 28	Prohibition	Willis James Hulings	20,676	40.59 / 100	Lost re-election as Prohibition; 2nd
1920	Pennsylvania 29	Socialist	James J. Marshall	3,604	7.65 / 100	3rd
1920	Pennsylvania 30	Socialist	Charles A. Fike	4,847	8.55 / 100	2nd
1920	Pennsylvania 31	Socialist	Albert R. Jerling	2,280	6.97 / 100	2nd
1920	Pennsylvania 32	Socialist	Earl O. Gunther	4,552	8.62 / 100	2nd
1920	Pennsylvania 32	Prohibition	George E. Briggs	3,953	7.49 / 100	3rd
1920	South Dakota 1	Nonpartisan League	Engebert J. Holter	15,810	22.63 / 100	2nd
1920	South Dakota 2	Nonpartisan League	Frank Whalen	18,357	25.54 / 100	2nd
1920	South Dakota 3	Nonpartisan League	O. E. Farnam	4,765	11.82 / 100	3rd
1920	Texas 2	American	G. E. H. Meyer	1,671	7.15 / 100	2nd
1920	Texas 6	American	Clyde Essex	3,668	15.45 / 100	2nd
1920	Texas 8	Black and Tan Republican	M. H. Broyles	5,750	17.35 / 100	3rd
1920	Texas 8	American	J. M. Gibson	1,918	5.79 / 100	4th
1920	Texas 10	American	B. G. Neighbors	7,597	34.52 / 100	2nd
1920	Texas 11	American	W. D. Lewis	4,124	20.89 / 100	2nd
1920	Texas 17	American	W. D. Cowan	4,298	16.15 / 100	2nd
1920	Washington 1	Farmer–Labor	James A. Duncan	28,154	31.01 / 100	2nd
1920	Washington 2	Farmer–Labor	William Morley Bouck	26,398	40.17 / 100	2nd
1920	Washington 3	Farmer–Labor	Homer Bone	27,824	30.56 / 100	2nd
1920	Washington 4	Farmer–Labor	Knute Hill	10,735	17.87 / 100	3rd
1920	Wisconsin 2	Socialist	Jacob F. Miller	4,969	8.45 / 100	3rd
1920	Wisconsin 4	Socialist	Robert Buech	22,137	38.55 / 100	2nd
1920	Wisconsin 5	Socialist	Victor L. Berger	34,004	45.47 / 100	Lost re-election 2nd
1920	Wisconsin 6	Socialist	Edward C. Damrow	5,714	10.32 / 100	3rd
1920	Wisconsin 7	Prohibition	Robert H. Clarke	8,929	18.85 / 100	2nd
1920	Wisconsin 8	Socialist	George W. Lippert	14,661	26.51 / 100	2nd
1920	Wisconsin 11	Socialist	John P. Jensen	6,524	14.63 / 100	2nd
1920	Wyoming at-large	Labor	James Morgan	6,021	10.67 / 100	3rd
1921	California 9	Prohibition	Charles Hiram Randall	21,056	37.99 / 100	2nd
1921	Pennsylvania at-large	Prohibition	Bryan E. P. Brugh	74,837	7.25 / 100	3rd

== 1928–1929 ==
Notable third-party House performances (1928–1929) – 14 entries - 1 victory
Year	District	Party	Candidate	# Votes	% Votes	Place
1928	California 4	Independent	Harry W. Hutton	16,838	25.12 / 100	2nd
1928	California 10	Socialist	Harry Sherr	19,659	6.11 / 100	2nd
1928	Illinois 1	Independent	William Harrison	5,861	11.44 / 100	3rd
1928	Minnesota 2	Farmer–Labor Party	L.A. Fritsche	33,092	46.27 / 100	2nd
1928	Minnesota 3	Farmer–Labor Party	Henry M. Arens	15,749	17.64 / 100	3rd
1928	Minnesota 6	Farmer–Labor Party	John Knutsen	28,276	33.69 / 100	2nd
1928	New York 6	Socialist	Bernard J. Riley	7,026	5.34 / 100	3rd
1928	New York 8	Socialist	William M. Feigenbaum	10,551	5.71 / 100	3rd
1928	New York 10	Socialist	Abraham I. Shiplacoff	3,645	6.79 / 100	3rd
1928	New York 14	Socialist	August Claessens	1,648	5.40 / 100	3rd
1928	New York 38	Independent	William MacFarlane	38,324	29.16 / 100	3rd
1928	Wisconsin 4	Socialist	Walter Polakowski	18,885	22.08 / 100	3rd
1929	Minnesota 7	Farmer–Labor Party	Ole J. Kvale	24,777	73.17 / 100	**Elected**
1929	New York 21	Socialist	Frank Crosswaith	3,561	5.06 / 100	3rd

== 1930 ==
Notable third-party House performances (1930) – 21 entries – 1 victory
Year	District	Party	Candidate	# Votes	% Votes	Place
1930	Georgia 8	Independent	W.N. Phillips	369	6.80 / 100	2nd
1930	Minnesota 1	Farmer–Labor Party	Matthew Fitzpatrick	24,357	34.95 / 100	2nd
1930	Minnesota 2	Farmer–Labor Party	L.A. Fritsche	33,092	46.27 / 100	2nd
1930	Minnesota 3	Farmer–Labor Party	Francis H. Shoemaker	21,118	28.42 / 100	2nd
1930	Minnesota 4	Farmer–Labor Party	Claus V. Hammerstrom	16,180	22.14 / 100	2nd
1930	Minnesota 6	Farmer–Labor Party	John Knutsen	19,461	26.76 / 100	2nd
1930	Minnesota 7	Farmer–Labor Party	Paul John Kvale	58,334	81.20 / 100	**Re-elected**
1930	Minnesota 8	Farmer–Labor Party	William L. Carss	29,001	32.91 / 100	2nd
1930	New York 3	Socialist	Joseph A. Weil	1,443	5.28 / 100	3rd
1930	New York 6	Socialist	Norman Thomas	21,938	22.10 / 100	3rd
1930	New York 8	Socialist	Baruch Charney Vladeck	23,662	16.88 / 100	3rd
1930	New York 9	Socialist	Wilhelmus B. Robinson	5,783	7.09 / 100	3rd
1930	New York 10	Socialist	Abraham I. Shiplacoff	5,050	12.36 / 100	3rd
1930	New York 12	Socialist	Marx Lewis	941	5.19 / 100	3rd
1930	New York 14	Socialist	Jacob Panken	6,793	25.86 / 100	2nd
1930	New York 17	Socialist	Heywood Broun	6,841	14.88 / 100	3rd
1930	New York 21	Socialist	Frank Crosswaith	3,699	5.24 / 100	3rd
1930	New York 25	Independent	John H. Holzworth	14,086	13.80 / 100	3rd
1930	Wisconsin 4	Socialist	William F. Quick	20,789	36.22 / 100	3rd
1930	Wisconsin 7	Independent	Merlin Hull	5,606	14.63 / 100	2nd

== 1936 ==
Notable third-party House performances (1936) – 19 entries – 8 victories
Year	District	Party	Candidate	# Votes	% Votes	Place
1936	California 4	California Progressive	Franck R. Havenner	64,063	58.46 / 100	**Elected**
1936	California 5	Communist	Lawrence Ross	4,545	5.20 / 100	2nd
1936	California 14	California Progressive	Lawrence Ross	12,874	12.40 / 100	2nd
1936	Massachusetts 8	Union	Nelson F. Wright	6,010	5.25 / 100	3rd
1936	Massachusetts 14	Union	Lawrence O. Witter	12,872	11.68 / 100	3rd
1936	Minnesota 1	Minnesota Farmer–Labor	Chester Watson	27,753	23.09 / 100	2nd
1936	Minnesota 2	Minnesota Farmer–Labor	Henry M. Arens	39,489	32.55 / 100	2nd
1936	Minnesota 4	Minnesota Farmer–Labor	Howard Y. Williams	48,039	38.03 / 100	2nd
1936	Minnesota 5	Minnesota Farmer–Labor	Dewey Johnson	67,349	47.83 / 100	**Elected**
1936	Minnesota 6	Minnesota Farmer–Labor	C. A. Ryan	47,707	39.61 / 100	2nd
1936	Minnesota 7	Minnesota Farmer–Labor	Paul John Kvale	56,310	49.67 / 100	**Re-elected**
1936	Minnesota 8	Minnesota Farmer–Labor	John T. Bernard	69,788	49.67 / 100	**Elected**
1936	Minnesota 9	Farmer–Labor Party	Rich T. Buckler	48,256	48.45 / 100	**Re-elected**
1936	New York 40	Union	Melvin A. Payne	13,593	7.54 / 100	3rd
1936	New York 42	Union	Anthony Fitzgibbons	6,840	6.76 / 100	3rd
1936	Rhode Island 2	Union	James J. Dunn	10,068	6.86 / 100	3rd
1936	Wisconsin 3	Progressive	Gardner R. Withrow	61,593	51.15 / 100	**Re-elected**
1936	Wisconsin 9	Progressive	Merlin Hull	61,593	80.73 / 100	**Re-elected**
1936	Wisconsin 10	Progressive	James J. Dunn	49,005	51.54 / 100	**Re-elected**

== 1938 ==
Notable third-party House performances (1938) – 42 entries – 3 victories
Year	District	Party	Candidate	# Votes	% Votes	Place
1938	California 1	Townsend	Ernest S. Mitchell	43,320	37.04 / 100	2nd
1938	California 3	Communist	Nora Conklin	8,271	6.43 / 100	2nd
1938	California 6	Communist	Dave L. Saunders	7,015	5.56 / 100	2nd
1938	California 11	Townsend	Ralph D. Horton	12,713	8.70 / 100	3rd
1938	California 12	Townsend	Russell R. Hand	7,903	6.41 / 100	3rd
1938	California 17	Townsend	Fred C. Wagner	8,870	9.24 / 100	3rd
1938	Connecticut 1	Socialist	Edward C. Roffler	24,357	15.66 / 100	3rd
1938	Connecticut 2	Socialist	Thomas E. Bowman	6,333	6.36 / 100	3rd
1938	Connecticut 3	Socialist	Harry Watstein	17,111	13.27 / 100	3rd
1938	Connecticut 4	Socialist	Charles H. McLevy	35,328	24.87 / 100	3rd
1938	Minnesota 2	Minnesota Farmer–Labor	C. F. Gaarenstroom	25,060	20.50 / 100	3rd
1938	Minnesota 3	Minnesota Farmer–Labor	Henry Teigan	50,505	42.79 / 100	Lost re-election 2nd
1938	Minnesota 4	Minnesota Farmer–Labor	Howard Y. Williams	40,558	35.76 / 100	2nd
1938	Minnesota 5	Minnesota Farmer–Labor	Dewey W. Johnson	40,656	36.78 / 100	Lost re-election 2nd
1938	Minnesota 6	Minnesota Farmer–Labor	Harry W. Christenson	36,023	28.51 / 100	2nd
1938	Minnesota 7	Minnesota Farmer–Labor	Paul J. Kvale	36,023	36.69 / 100	Lost re-election 2nd
1938	Minnesota 8	Minnesota Farmer–Labor	John Toussaint Bernard	54,381	41.42 / 100	Lost re-election 2nd
1938	Minnesota 9	Minnesota Farmer–Labor	Richard Thompson Buckler	44,017	41.99 / 100	**Elected**
1938	Nebraska 1	Independent	Catherine F. McGerr	6,153	6.35 / 100	3rd
1938	New York 3	American Labor	Bernard Kleban	4,898	11.20 / 100	3rd
1938	New York 5	American Labor	Joseph Dermody	8,352	10.73 / 100	3rd
1938	New York 7	American Labor	Bernard Reswick	9,734	19.45 / 100	3rd
1938	New York 9	American Labor	Spencer K. Binyon	12,199	10.98 / 100	3rd
1938	New York 11	American Labor	John V. Murphy	4,527	6.60 / 100	3rd
1938	New York 13	American Labor	Eugene P. Connolly	3,541	16.96 / 100	3rd
1938	New York 15	American Labor	Daniel L. McDonough	3,103	9.39 / 100	3rd
1938	New York 17	American Labor	George Backer	6,120	8.33 / 100	3rd
1938	New York 18	American Labor	Martin C. Kyne	3,440	8.10 / 100	3rd
1938	New York 19	American Labor	Joseph Schlossberg	15,033	18.58 / 100	3rd
1938	New York 20	American Labor	Vito Marcantonio	18,960	59.74 / 100	**Elected**
1938	New York 23	American Labor	Isidore Nagler	67,273	28.39 / 100	2nd
1938	New York 24	American Labor	Bartholmew F. Murphy	40,931	17.08 / 100	3rd
1938	New York 36	American Labor	Charles P. Russell	19,020	21.50 / 100	3rd
1938	New York 39	American Labor	Edward J. Wagner	5,460	5.48 / 100	3rd
1938	Tennessee 1	Independent	James P. Kivett	4,382	10.94 / 100	3rd
1938	Wisconsin 2	Progressive	Harry Sauthoff	40,656	43.25 / 100	Lost re-election 2nd
1938	Wisconsin 3	Progressive	Gardner R. Withrow	36,509	42.02 / 100	Lost re-election 2nd
1938	Wisconsin 5	Progressive	Alfred Benson	29,874	27.40 / 100	3rd
1938	Wisconsin 6	Progressive	Adam F. Poltl	13,258	15.42 / 100	3rd
1938	Wisconsin 7	Progressive	Gerald J. Boileau	32,442	38.05 / 100	Lost re-election 2nd
1938	Wisconsin 8	Progressive	George J. Schneider	29,035	31.52 / 100	Lost re-election 2nd
1938	Wisconsin 10	Progressive	Bernard J. Gehrmann	45,874	57.54 / 100	**Re-elected**

== 1940 ==
Notable third-party House performances (1940) – 35 entries – 4 victories
Year	District	Party	Candidate	# Votes	% Votes	Place
1940	California 1	Communist	Albert J. Lima	5,647	5.09 / 100	2nd
1940	California 3	Prohibition	C. H. Farman	10,539	7.08 / 100	2nd
1940	California 13	Prohibition	Charles Hiram Randall	36,406	21.67 / 100	2nd
1940	Minnesota 1	Minnesota Farmer–Labor	Endre B. Anderson	20,700	34.19 / 100	3rd
1940	Minnesota 2	Minnesota Farmer–Labor	Endre B. Anderson	11,534	8.49 / 100	3rd
1940	Minnesota 3	Minnesota Farmer–Labor	Henry G. Teigan	50,222	34.19 / 100	2nd
1940	Minnesota 4	Minnesota Farmer–Labor	George L. Siegel	32,898	28.25 / 100	2nd
1940	Minnesota 5	Minnesota Farmer–Labor	Dewey W. Johnson	52,289	34.29 / 100	2nd
1940	Minnesota 7	Minnesota Farmer–Labor	Harold L. Peterson	42,356	32.55 / 100	2nd
1940	Minnesota 8	Minnesota Farmer–Labor	John Toussaint Bernard	39,252	28.52 / 100	2nd
1940	Minnesota 9	Minnesota Farmer–Labor	Rich T. Buckler	48,999	43.43 / 100	**Re-elected**
1940	New York 2	American Labor	Matthew Napear	20,827	5.08 / 100	3rd
1940	New York 4	American Labor	Michael Giaratano	3,636	5.52 / 100	3rd
1940	New York 6	American Labor	Irving B. Altman	31,945	14.13 / 100	3rd
1940	New York 8	American Labor	Benjamin Brenner	52,972	13.83 / 100	3rd
1940	New York 11	American Labor	Wellington Roe	5,193	5.50 / 100	3rd
1940	New York 12	American Labor	Bernard Harkavy	3,664	15.39 / 100	2nd
1940	New York 13	American Labor	Geno Bardi	2,534	8.67 / 100	3rd
1940	New York 15	American Labor	Joseph Curran	4,623	10.48 / 100	3rd
1940	New York 16	American Labor	Thomas Darcey	3,874	6.08 / 100	3rd
1940	New York 17	American Labor	Morris Watson	5,625	5.39 / 100	3rd
1940	New York 18	American Labor	Shaemas O'Sheal	3,612	6.11 / 100	3rd
1940	New York 19	American Labor	Benjamin M. Zelman	9,209	8.15 / 100	3rd
1940	New York 20	American Labor	Vito Marcantonio	25,254	62.49 / 100	**Re-elected**
1940	New York 23	American Labor	George Thomas	35,233	14.91 / 100	3rd
1940	New York 24	American Labor	George Thomas	35,233	10.39 / 100	3rd
1940	Wisconsin 1	Progressive	Stanley W. Slagg	28,308	22.81 / 100	2nd
1940	Wisconsin 2	Progressive	Harry Sauthoff	60,481	44.20 / 100	**Elected**
1940	Wisconsin 3	Progressive	Gardner R. Withrow	52,131	44.03 / 100	2nd
1940	Wisconsin 4	Progressive	Leonard C. Fons	52,907	32.84 / 100	2nd
1940	Wisconsin 5	Progressive	James M. Pasch	54,501	32.81 / 100	2nd
1940	Wisconsin 6	Progressive	Walter D. Corrigan	19,387	16.66 / 100	3rd
1940	Wisconsin 7	Progressive	Gerald J. Boileau	40,558	35.66 / 100	2nd
1940	Wisconsin 8	Progressive	Michael F. Kresky	49,005	44.15 / 100	2nd
1940	Wisconsin 10	Progressive	Bernard J. Gehrmann	50,776	47.96 / 100	**Re-elected**

== 1942 ==
Notable third-party House performances (1942) – 8 entries – 2 victories
Year	District	Party	Candidate	# Votes	% Votes	Place
1942	California 1	Communist	Albert J. Lima	5,703	6.79 / 100	2nd
1942	New York 3	American Labor	Joseph A. Weil	3,693	11.77 / 100	3rd
1942	New York 9	American Labor	Albert Slade	10,957	11.35 / 100	3rd
1942	New York 15	American Labor	John Rogan	2,798	11.14 / 100	3rd
1942	Wisconsin 2	Progressive	Harry Sauthoff	43,412	50.20 / 100	**Re-elected**
1942	Wisconsin 3	Progressive	Gardner R. Withrow	31,092	42.64 / 100	2nd
1942	Wisconsin 5	Progressive	Rory A. Roush	16,409	15.99 / 100	3rd
1942	Wisconsin 9	Progressive	Merlin Hull	37,919	61.82 / 100	**Re-elected**

== 1950 ==
Notable third-party House performances (1950) – 8 entries - 1 victory
Year	District	Party	Candidate	# Votes	% Votes	Place
1950	New York 3	Liberal (NY)	Mark Starr	51,024	6.77 / 100	3rd of 4
1950	New York 8	American Labor	Antonio Iandiorio	4,119	6.03 / 100	3rd of 4
1950	New York 13	American Labor	Ralph Shapiro	6,247	6.47 / 100	3rd of 3
1950	New York 14	American Labor	Helen Phillips	9,859	9.28 / 100	3rd of 3
1950	New York 17	American Labor	Robert T. Leicester	5,492	5.12 / 100	3rd of 3
1950	New York 19	American Labor	Bernard Harkavy	8,597	9.74 / 100	3rd of 3
1950	New York 20	American Labor	John W. Darr Jr.	5,717	6.18 / 100	3rd of 3
1950	Ohio 9	Independent	Henry Frazier Reams Sr.	51,024	36.55 / 100	**Elected**

== 1968 ==
Notable third-party House performances (1968) – 24 entries
Year	District	Party	Candidate	# Votes	% Votes	Place
1968	Alabama 2	National Democratic Party of Alabama	Richard C. Boone	11,446	10.43 / 100	3rd
1968	Alabama 3	National Democratic Party of Alabama	Wilbur Johnston	8,031	8.40 / 100	2nd
1968	California 7	Peace and Freedom	Huey P. Newton	12,279	7.52 / 100	3rd
1968	Colorado 1	Independent	Gordon G. Barnewall	25,499	19 / 100	3rd
1968	Massachusetts 3	Independent	Chandler H. Stevens	53,047	27.70 / 100	2nd
1968	New York 1	Conservative (NY)	Harold Haar	19,470	8.83 / 100	3rd
1968	New York 3	Conservative (NY)	Daniel L. Rice	14,556	7.71 / 100	3rd
1968	New York 6	Conservative (NY)	Thomas J. Adams Jr.	20,511	12.42 / 100	3rd
1968	New York 8	Conservative (NY)	Charles Witteck Jr.	14,714	8.54 / 100	3rd
1968	New York 9	Liberal (NY)	Rose L. Rubin	8,935	6.39 / 100	3rd
1968	New York 12	Conservative (NY)	Ralph J. Carrano	5,422	8.22 / 100	3rd
1968	New York 14	Conservative (NY)	Alice A. Capatosto	5,422	8.22 / 100	3rd
1968	New York 15	Conservative (NY)	Stephen P. Marion	7,920	7.64 / 100	3rd
1968	New York 16	Liberal (NY)	Joseph Kottler	7,883	5.25 / 100	3rd
1968	New York 17	Conservative (NY)	Richard J. Callahan	9,030	5.87 / 100	3rd
1968	New York 22	Liberal (NY)	Carlos Rosario	3,552	6.47 / 100	3rd
1968	New York 25	Conservative (NY)	Anthony J. DeVito	14,463	6.75 / 100	3rd
1968	New York 26	Conservative (NY)	A. Lining Burnet	16,877	8.83 / 100	3rd
1968	New York 27	Conservative (NY)	Frederick P. Roland	14,239	7.20 / 100	3rd
1968	New York 32	Conservative (NY)	Albert J. Bushong	10,393	6.96 / 100	3rd
1968	New York 36	Conservative (NY)	Leo Kesselring	9,916	5.04 / 100	3rd
1968	Tennessee 5	American Independent	William F. Burton Jr.	11,412	9.11 / 100	3rd
1968	Virginia 1	Independent	J. Cornelius Fauntleroy Jr.	19,229	14.57 / 100	2nd
1968	Virginia 5	Independent	Ruth L. Harvey	21,196	18.69 / 100	2nd

== 1970 ==
Notable third-party House performances (1970) – 19 entries
Year	District	Party	Candidate	# Votes	% Votes	Place
1970	Alabama 1	National Democratic Party of Alabama	Noble Beasley	13,798	13.18 / 100	3rd
1970	Alabama 2	National Democratic Party of Alabama	Percy Smith Jr.	13,281	13.08 / 100	3rd
1970	Alabama 3	National Democratic Party of Alabama	Detroit Lee	8,537	10.87 / 100	2nd
1970	Alabama 5	National Democratic Party of Alabama	T.Y. Rogers	24,863	24.09 / 100	2nd
1970	Louisiana 1	Independent	Luke Fontana	9,602	12.65 / 100	2nd
1970	Massachusetts 3	Independent	Philip J. Philbin	45,278	26.67 / 100	3rd
1970	Massachusetts 9	Independent	Daniel J. Houton	17,395	20.47 / 100	2nd
1970	Mississippi 2	Independent	Eugene Carter	8,092	26.67 / 100	2nd
1970	New York 3	Conservative (NY)	Lois Camardi	12,925	7.45 / 100	3rd
1970	New York 4	Conservative (NY)	Donald A. Derham	12,701	7.89 / 100	3rd
1970	New York 6	Conservative (NY)	John J. Flynn	26,244	22.72 / 100	2nd
1970	New York 7	Conservative (NY)	Christopher T. Acer	11,515	9.25 / 100	2nd
1970	New York 9	Liberal (NY)	Rose L. Rubin	8,935	6.39 / 100	3rd
1970	New York 13	Liberal (NY)	Herbert Dicker	9,925	7.48 / 100	3rd
1970	New York 17	Conservative (NY)	Richard J. Callahan	9,586	6.05 / 100	3rd
1970	New York 18	Liberal (NY)	Charles Taylor	6,385	10.52 / 100	2nd
1970	New York 20	Conservative (NY)	Francis C. Saunders	6,315	6.75 / 100	3rd
1970	New York 21	Conservative (NY)	George B. Smaragdas	7,561	16.29 / 100	2nd
1970	North Carolina 6	American Independent	Lynwood Bullock	3,849	5.33 / 100	3rd

== 1974 ==
Notable third-party House performances (1974) – 5 entries
Year	District	Party	Candidate	# Votes	% Votes	Place
1974	California 1	American Independent	Dorothy D. Paradis	22,881	14.22 / 100	2nd
1974	California 32	American Independent	Virgil V. Badalich	8,874	9.22 / 100	2nd
1974	District of Columbia at-large	Independent	James G. Banks	21,874	21.03 / 100	2nd
1974	Massachusetts 4	Independent	Jon Rotenberg	52,785	34.73 / 100	2nd
1974	Massachusetts 7	Independent	James J. Murphy	30,959	20.22 / 100	2nd

== 1980 ==
Notable third-party House performances (1980) – 5 entries
Year	District	Party	Candidate	# Votes	% Votes	Place
1980	New Mexico 2	Independent	Dorothy Runnels	45,343	27.99 / 100	3rd
1980	South Carolina 4	Libertarian	Thomas P. Waldenfels	6,984	7.1 / 100	2nd
1980	South Carolina 5	Libertarian	Thomas Campbell	14,252	12.5 / 100	2nd
1980	Vermont at-large	Citizens	Robin Lloyd	25,280	12.94 / 100	2nd
1980	Vermont at-large	Liberty Union	Peter Diamondstone	15,218	7.79 / 100	3rd

== 1984 ==
Notable third-party House performances (1984) – 9 entries
Year	District	Party	Candidate	# Votes	% Votes	Place
1984	Arizona 2	Independent	Lorenzo Torrez	14,869	12.27 / 100	2nd
1984	Arkansas 2	Independent	Jim Taylor	25,073	14.45 / 100	3rd
1984	California 22	Libertarian	Michael B. Yauch	32,036	14.75 / 100	2nd
1984	California 35	Peace and Freedom	Kevin Akin	32,036	14.53 / 100	2nd
1984	Colorado 6	Independent	John Heckman	20,333	10.60 / 100	2nd
1984	Massachusetts 8	Communist	Laura Ross	15,810	8.08 / 100	2nd
1984	Mississippi 1	Independent	John Hargett	17,991	11.64 / 100	2nd
1984	New York 19	Conservative (NY)	Alice Farrell	8,472	5.18 / 100	2nd
1984	Virginia 3	Independent	Roger L. Coffey	28,556	14.38 / 100	2nd

== 1996 ==
Notable third-party House performances (1996) – 15 entries - 2 victories
Year	District	Party	Candidate	# Votes	% Votes	Place
1996	California 1	Libertarian	Emil Rossi	15,354	6.91 / 100	3rd
1996	California 39	Libertarian	Jack Dean	10,137	5.29 / 100	3rd
1996	Illinois 2	Libertarian	Frank Stratman	10,880	5.93 / 100	2nd
1996	Illinois 4	Libertarian	William Passmore	5,587	6.43 / 100	2nd
1996	Minnesota 5	Grassroots	Erika Anderson	13,102	5.32 / 100	3rd
1996	Minnesota 8	Reform	Stan Estes	16,639	6.04 / 100	3rd
1996	Missouri 8	Independent	Jo Ann Emerson	112,472	50.47 / 100	**Elected**
1996	New York 19	Conservative	Joe DioGuardi	27,424	12.43 / 100	3rd
1996	New York 21	Libertarian	Lee Wasserman	16,794	7.00 / 100	3rd
1996	New York 23	Independence	Thomas Loughlin	10,835	5.59 / 100	3rd
1996	Ohio 2	Natural Law	Kathleen McKnight	13,905	5.36 / 100	3rd
1996	Ohio 7	Natural Law	Dawn Johnson	13,478	5.78 / 100	3rd
1996	Ohio 17	Natural Law	James Cahaney	21,685	9.04 / 100	2nd
1996	South Carolina 2	Natural Law	Maurice Raiford	17,713	10.05 / 100	2nd
1996	Vermont at-large	Independent	Bernie Sanders	140,678	55.23 / 100	**Re-elected**

== 1998 ==
Notable third-party House performances (1998) – 16 entries – 1 victory
Year	District	Party	Candidate	# Votes	% Votes	Place
1998	Arkansas 3	Reform	Ralph Forbes	36,917	19.26 / 100	2nd
1998	California 18	Libertarian	Linda M. Degroat	18,089	13.21 / 100	2nd
1998	California 19	Libertarian	Jonathan Richter	34,044	20.61 / 100	2nd
1998	California 21	Reform	John Evans	30,994	21.09 / 100	2nd
1998	California 25	Libertarian	Bruce Acker	38,669	25.33 / 100	2nd
1998	California 26	Libertarian	Juan Carlos Ros	6,556	7.84 / 100	2nd
1998	California 26	Green	Maria Armoudian	4,858	5.81 / 100	3rd
1998	California 31	Green	Krista Lieberg-Wong	4,377	5.01 / 100	3rd
1998	California 35	American Independent	Gordon Michael Mego	9,413	10.68 / 100	2nd
1998	California 48	Natural Law	Sharon K. Miles	12.87	12.87 / 100	2nd
1998	California 48	Libertarian	Daniel L. Muhe	18,509	10.24 / 100	3rd
1998	California 52	Libertarian	Lynn Badler	21,933	14.28 / 100	2nd
1998	California 52	Natural Law	Adrienne Pelton	15,380	10.02 / 100	3rd
1998	Florida 5	Reform	Jack Gargan	67,147	33.72 / 100	2nd
1998	Michigan 4	Libertarian	Dan Marsh	10,404	6.11 / 100	2nd
1998	Vermont at-large	Independent	Bernie Sanders	136,403	63.40 / 100	**Re-elected**

== 2000 ==
Notable third-party House performances (2000) – 48 entries - 2 victories
Year	District	Party	Candidate	# Votes	% Votes	Place
2000	Alabama 1	Libertarian	Dick Coffee	14,031	8.47 / 100	2nd
2000	Alabama 3	Libertarian	John Sophocleus	21,119	12.46 / 100	2nd
2000	Alabama 5	Libertarian	Alan Barksdale	22,110	10.55 / 100	2nd
2000	Alabama 6	Libertarian	Terry Reagin	28,189	11.65 / 100	2nd
2000	Alaska at-large	Green	Anna C. Young	22,440	8.18 / 100	3rd
2000	California 31	Green	Krista Lieberg-Wong	10,294	9.12 / 100	2nd
2000	California 31	Libertarian	Michael McGuire	7,138	6.32 / 100	3rd
2000	California 31	Natural Law	Richard D. Griffin	5,882	5.21 / 100	4th
2000	California 34	Natural Law	Julia F. Simon	9,262	6.23 / 100	3rd
2000	California 40	Natural Law	Frank N. Schmit	19,029	10.07 / 100	2nd
2000	California 40	Libertarian	Jay Lindberg	18,924	10.01 / 100	3rd
2000	California 43	Libertarian	Bill Reed	29,755	15.63 / 100	2nd
2000	California 43	Natural Law	Nat Adam	20,376	10.70 / 100	3rd
2000	Colorado 4	Natural Law	Dan Sewell Ward	19,721	7.50 / 100	2nd
2000	Colorado 4	Libertarian	Kordon L. Baker	19,713	7.50 / 100	3rd
2000	Colorado 5	Libertarian	Kerry Kantor	37,719	12.31 / 100	2nd
2000	Florida 9	Reform	Jon Duffey	46,474	18.10 / 100	2nd
2000	Florida 10	Natural Law	Josette Green	26,908	13.87 / 100	2nd
2000	Florida 10	Independent	Randy Heine	20,296	10.46 / 100	3rd
2000	Florida 11	Libertarian	Charlie Westlake	27,197	15.39 / 100	2nd
2000	Florida 14	Natural Law	Sam Farling	41,988	14.75 / 100	2nd
2000	Illinois 4	Libertarian	Stephanie Sailor	11,476	11.37 / 100	2nd
2000	Illinois 5	Libertarian	Matt Beauchamp	20,728	12.72 / 100	2nd
2000	Indiana 2	Independent	Bill Frazier	19,077	9.15 / 100	3rd
2000	Kansas 1	Libertarian	Jack Warner	25,843	10.66 / 100	2nd
2000	Kentucky 6	Reform	Gatewood Galbraith	32,436	11.98 / 100	3rd
2000	Minnesota 4	Independence	Tom Foley	55,899	20.59 / 100	3rd
2000	Minnesota 8	Independent	Mike Darling	19,667	6.35 / 100	3rd
2000	New Mexico 1	Green	Dan Kerlinsky	13,656	6.41 / 100	3rd
2000	Texas 2	Libertarian	Gary Lyndon Dye	15,939	8.91 / 100	2nd
2000	Texas 6	Libertarian	Frank Brady	30,056	11.89 / 100	2nd
2000	Texas 8	Libertarian	Gil Guillory	21,368	8.37 / 100	2nd
2000	Texas 10	Libertarian	Michael Davis	37,203	15.45 / 100	2nd
2000	Texas 15	Libertarian	Frank Jones	13,167	10.93 / 100	2nd
2000	Texas 17	Libertarian	Debra Monde	11,180	5.47 / 100	3rd
2000	Texas 19	Libertarian	John Turnbow	15,579	8.38 / 100	2nd
2000	Texas 20	Libertarian	Alex De Pena	15,087	12.31 / 100	2nd
2000	Texas 28	Libertarian	William Stallknecht	15,156	10.96 / 100	2nd
2000	Texas 30	Libertarian	Kelly Rush	9,798	8.24 / 100	2nd
2000	Vermont at-large	Independent	Bernie Sanders	196,118	69.21 / 100	**Re-elected**
2000	Virginia 5	Independent	Virgil Goode	143,312	67.38 / 100	**Re-elected**
2000	Virginia 10	Independent	Brian Brown	28,107	9.90 / 100	2nd
2000	Virginia 10	Independent	Marc Rossi	16,031	5.70 / 100	3rd
2000	Washington 7	Green	Joe Szwaja	52,142	19.62 / 100	2nd
2000	Washington 7	Libertarian	Joel Grus	20,197	7.60 / 100	3rd
2000	West Virginia 1	Libertarian	Richard Kerr	25,843	12.22 / 100	2nd
2000	West Virginia 2	Libertarian	John Brown	12,543	5.59 / 100	3rd
2000	West Virginia 3	Libertarian	Jeff Robinson	13,979	8.69 / 100	2nd

== 2002 ==
Notable third-party House performances (2002) – 17 entries - 1 victory
Year	District	Party	Candidate	# Votes	% Votes	Place
2002	Alabama 4	Libertarian	Tonny H. McLenden	20,858	12.95 / 100	2nd
2002	Alabama 6	Libertarian	J. Holden McAllister	19,639	9.90 / 100	2nd
2002	Alaska at-large	Green	Russell F. DeForest	14,435	6.35 / 100	3rd
2002	Arizona 1	Libertarian	Edwin Porr	8,990	5.15 / 100	3rd
2002	California 8	Green	Jay Pond	10,033	6.25 / 100	3rd
2002	California 12	Libertarian	Maad Abu-Ghazaleh	10,033	7.10 / 100	3rd
2002	District of Columbia at-large	Independent	Pat Kidd	7,733	6.03 / 100	2nd
2002	Minnesota 5	Green	Tim Davis	17,825	7.1 / 100	3rd
2002	North Carolina 3	Libertarian	Gary Goodson	13,486	9.31 / 100	2nd
2002	Ohio 5	Independent	John Green	10,096	5.36 / 100	3rd
2002	Ohio 17	Independent	James Traficant	28,045	15.19 / 100	3rd
2002	Pennsylvania 3	Green	AnnDrea Benson	33,554	22.32 / 100	2nd
2002	Pennsylvania 10	Green	Kurt Shotko	11,613	7.10 / 100	2nd
2002	Vermont at-large	Independent	Bernie Sanders	144,880	64.26 / 100	**Re-elected**
2002	Virginia 2	Green	D.C. Amarasinghe	20,589	16.49 / 100	2nd
2002	Virginia 11	Constitution	Frank Creel	26,892	16.47 / 100	2nd
2002	Washington 5	Libertarian	Rob Chase	10,379	5.13 / 100	3rd

== 2004 ==
Notable third-party House performances (2004) – 33 entries - 1 victory
Year	District	Party	Candidate	# Votes	% Votes	Place
2004	Arizona 1	Libertarian	John Crockett	13,260	5.2 / 100	3rd
2004	Arizona 3	Libertarian	Mark Yannone	44,962	19.9 / 100	2nd
2004	Arizona 6	Libertarian	Craig Stritar	51,285	20.6 / 100	2nd
2004	California 12	Green	Patricia Gray	23,038	9.12 / 100	3rd
2004	California 19	Green	Larry Mullen	15,863	6.74 / 100	3rd
2004	California 28	Libertarian	Kelley Ross	9,339	5.75 / 100	3rd
2004	California 32	Libertarian	Leland Faegre	21,002	14.99 / 100	2nd
2004	California 33	Libertarian	Robert "Bob" Weber	21,513	11.42 / 100	2nd
2004	California 41	Libertarian	Peymon Mottahedeh	37,332	17.05 / 100	2nd
2004	Florida 11	Libertarian	Robert Johnson	31,579	14.2 / 100	2nd
2004	Florida 21	Libertarian	Frank Gonzalez	54,736	27.2 / 100	2nd
2004	Illinois 2	Libertarian	Stephanie Sailor	26,990	11.51 / 100	2nd
2004	Massachusetts 4	Independent	Chuck Morse	62,293	22.09 / 100	2nd
2004	Minnesota 4	Independence	Peter Vento	29,099	9.2 / 100	3rd
2004	Minnesota 5	Green	Jay Pond	17,984	5.7 / 100	3rd
2004	Mississippi 1	Reform	Barbara Dale Washer	58,256	20.99 / 100	2nd
2004	Mississippi 3	Independent	Jim Giles	40,426	13.78 / 100	2nd
2004	Mississippi 3	Reform	Lamonica L. Magee	18,068	6.16 / 100	3rd
2004	New York 29	Conservative	Mark Assini	17,272	6.4 / 100	3rd
2004	Ohio 10	Independent	Barbara Anne Ferris	18,343	6.39 / 100	3rd
2004	Pennsylvania 5	Libertarian	Tom Martin	26,239	12.0 / 100	2nd
2004	Pennsylvania 10	Constitution	Veronica Hannevig	14,805	7.16 / 100	2nd
2004	South Carolina 1	Green	James Dunn	25,674	12.1 / 100	2nd
2004	Texas 3	Independent	Paul Jenkins	16,966	8.07 / 100	2nd
2004	Texas 3	Libertarian	James Vessels	13,287	6.32 / 100	3rd
2004	Texas 10	Libertarian	Robert William Fritsche	35,569	15.4 / 100	2nd
2004	Texas 13	Libertarian	Marion Smith	15,793	7.69 / 100	2nd
2004	Texas 29	Libertarian	Clifford Lee Messina	4,868	5.86 / 100	2nd
2004	Texas 30	Libertarian	John E. Davis	10,821	6.97 / 100	2nd
2004	Vermont at-large	Independent	Bernie Sanders	205,774	67.46 / 100	**Re-elected**
2004	Virginia 1	Independent Green	William A. Lee	57,434	20.04 / 100	2nd
2004	Virginia 7	Independent Green	Brad Blanton	74,325	24.3 / 100	2nd
2004	Wisconsin 7	Green	Mike Miles	17,984	5.7 / 100	2nd

== 2006 ==
Notable third-party House performances (2006) – 40 entries (Note: Include 1 special election in 2007.)
Year	District	Party	Candidate	# Votes	% Votes	Place
2006	Arizona 6	Libertarian	Jason M. Blair	51,285	25.2 / 100	2nd
2006	California 4	Libertarian	Dan Warren	14,076	5.08 / 100	3rd
2006	California 7	Libertarian	Camden McConnell	22,486	16.01 / 100	2nd
2006	California 8	Green	Krissy Keefer	13,653	7.39 / 100	3rd
2006	California 29	Green	Bill Paparian	8,197	5.72 / 100	3rd
2006	California 32	Libertarian	Leland Faegre	15,627	17.04 / 100	2nd
2006	California 35	American Independent	Gordon Mego	8,343	8.47 / 100	2nd
2006	California 35	Libertarian	Paul Ireland	7,665	7.78 / 100	3rd
2006	California 37	Libertarian	Herb Peters	17,246	17.6 / 100	2nd
2006	Colorado 1	Green	Thomas D. Kelly	32,825	20.23 / 100	2nd
2006	Colorado 4	Reform	Eric Eidsness	27,133	11.28 / 100	3rd
2006	Florida 12	Independent	Joe Viscusi	34,976	19.42 / 100	2nd
2006	Illinois 8	Moderate	Bill Scheurer	9,319	5.08 / 100	3rd
2006	Kentucky 6	Libertarian	Paul Ard	27,015	14.54 / 100	2nd
2006	Louisiana 6	Libertarian	Richard Fontanesi	19,648	17.19 / 100	2nd
2006	Maine 1	Independent	Dexter J. Kamilewicz	22,029	7.84 / 100	3rd
2006	Maryland 5	Green	Steve Warner	33,464	16.46 / 100	2nd
2006	Massachusetts 1	Independent	William H. Szych	48,574	23.48 / 100	2nd
2006	Massachusetts 8	Socialist Workers	Laura Garza	12,449	8.99 / 100	2nd
2006	Massachusetts 10	Independent	Peter A. White	16,808	6.29 / 100	3rd
2006	Minnesota 5	Independence	Tammy Lee	51,456	21.01 / 100	3rd
2006	Minnesota 6	Independence	John Paul Binkowski	23,557	7.8 / 100	3rd
2006	Mississippi 3	Independent	Jim Giles	25,999	16.1 / 100	2nd
2006	Mississippi 3	Reform	Lamonica L. Magee	10,060	6.23 / 100	3rd
2006	Oklahoma 1	Independent	Bill Wortman	10,085	5.49 / 100	3rd
2006	Pennsylvania 14	Green	Titus North	17,720	9.91 / 100	2nd
2006	Rhode Island 1	Independent	Kenneth A. Capalbo	13,634	7.57 / 100	3rd
2006	Rhode Island 2	Independent	Rod Driver	52,729	27.31 / 100	2nd
2006	Tennessee 9	Independent	Jake Ford	38,243	22.16 / 100	2nd
2006	Texas 16	Libertarian	Gordon R. Strickland	16,572	21.33 / 100	2nd
2006	Texas 20	Libertarian	Michael Idrogo	9,897	12.65 / 100	2nd
2006	Texas 22 (Note: A special election and general election were held the same day. While write-in candidate Shelley Sekula-Gibbs came in 2nd place in the general election, she is not listed here because of her status as the de facto Republican nominee.)	Libertarian	Bob Smither	22,166	18.69 / 100	2nd
2006	Texas 22	Libertarian	Bob Smither	9,009	6.06 / 100	3rd
2006	Texas 28	Constitution	Ron Avery	9,383	12.07 / 100	3rd
2006	Utah 3	Constitution	Jim Noorlander	14,533	8.79 / 100	3rd
2006	Virginia 4	Independent Green	Albert P. Burckard	46,487	23.44 / 100	2nd
2006	Virginia 6	Independent	Barbara Jean Pryor	25,129	12.32 / 100	2nd
2006	Virginia 6	Independent	Andre D. Peery	24,731	12.12 / 100	3rd
2006	Virgin Islands at-large	Independent	Warren Mosler	10,800	37.08 / 100	2nd
2007	California 37	Green	Daniel Brezenoff	1,274	5.37 / 100	3rd

== 2008 ==
Notable third-party House performances (2008) – 59 entries (Note: Include 3 special elections in 2009.)
Year	District	Party	Candidate	# Votes	% Votes	Place
2008	American Samoa at-large	Independent	Eni Faleomavaega	7,498	60.38 / 100	**Elected**
2008	American Samoa at-large	Independent	Amata Coleman Radewagen	4,349	35.02 / 100	2nd
2008	Arkansas 2	Green	Deb McFarland	64,398	21.38 / 100	2nd
2008	Arkansas 3	Green	Abel Tomlinson	58,850	20.35 / 100	2nd
2008	Arkansas 4	Green	Joshua Drake	32,603	12.95 / 100	2nd
2008	California 1	Green	Carol Wolman	24,793	8.54 / 100	3rd
2008	California 8	Independent	Cindy Sheehan	46,118	16.17 / 100	2nd
2008	California 15	Green	Peter Myers	12,123	5.08 / 100	3rd
2008	California 26	Libertarian	Ted Brown	18,476	6.92 / 100	3rd
2008	California 27	Libertarian	Tim Denton	14,171	6.66 / 100	3rd
2008	California 37	Independent	Nicholas Dibs	42,774	24.41 / 100	2nd
2008	California 38	Libertarian	Christopher Agrella	29,113	18.27 / 100	2nd
2008	California 47	American Independent	Robert Lauten	6,274	5.08 / 100	3rd
2008	District of Columbia at-large	D.C. Statehood Green	Maude Hills	16,693	6.75 / 100	2nd
2008	Florida 13	Independent	Jan Schneider	20,289	5.51 / 100	3rd
2008	Florida 14	Independent	Burt Saunders	54,750	14.44 / 100	3rd
2008	Florida 19	Independent	Ben Graber	20,214	6.61 / 100	3rd
2008	Florida 20	Independent	Margaret Hostetter	58,958	22.52 / 100	2nd
2008	Illinois 3	Green	Jerome Pohlen	12,607	5.35 / 100	3rd
2008	Illinois 4	Green	Omar N. López	11,053	7.92 / 100	3rd
2008	Illinois 11	Green	Jason Wallace	22,635	7.12 / 100	3rd
2008	Indiana 3	Libertarian	William R. Larsen	14,877	5.26 / 100	3rd
2008	Kentucky 5	Independent	Jim Holbert	33,444	15.89 / 100	2nd
2008	Louisiana 6	Independent	Michael Jackson	36,198	11.59 / 100	3rd
2008	Massachusetts 4	Independent	Susan Allen	19,848	6.64 / 100	3rd
2008	Minnesota 3	Independence	David Dillon	38,970	10.56 / 100	3rd
2008	Minnesota 5	Independence	Bill McGaughey	22,318	6.92 / 100	3rd
2008	Minnesota 6	Independence	Bob Anderson	40,643	10.04 / 100	3rd
2008	Missouri 1	Libertarian	Robb E. Cunningham	36,700	13.14 / 100	3rd
2008	New Jersey 7	Independent	Michael Hsing	15,826	5.66 / 100	3rd
2008	New Mexico 3	Independent	Carol Miller	35,789	12.77 / 100	3rd
2008	New York 9	Conservative	Alfred F. Donohue	8,378	6.95 / 100	2nd
2008	Northern Mariana Islands at-large	Independent	Gregorio Sablan	2,474	24.35 / 100	**Elected**
2008	Northern Mariana Islands at-large	Independent	John Gonzales	1,855	18.26 / 100	3rd
2008	Northern Mariana Islands at-large	Independent	Juan Lizama	1,819	17.9 / 100	4th
2008	Northern Mariana Islands at-large	Independent	Luis Crisostimo	946	9.31 / 100	5th
2008	Ohio 2	Independent	David Krikorian	58,710	17.7 / 100	3rd
2008	Oklahoma 3	Independent	Forrest Michael	17,756	6.72 / 100	3rd
2008	Oregon 1	Independent Party	Joel Haugen	58,279	17.54 / 100	2nd
2008	Oregon 4	Constitution	Jaynee Germond	43,133	12.91 / 100	2nd
2008	Pennsylvania 14	Green	Titus North	23,214	8.74 / 100	2nd
2008	Puerto Rico at-large	New Progressive	Pedro Pierluisi	1,010,285	53.05 / 100	**Elected**
2008	Puerto Rico at-large	Popular Democratic	Alfredo Salazar Jr.	810,093	42.54 / 100	2nd
2008	Rhode Island 1	Independent	Kenneth A. Capalbo	15,108	7.13 / 100	3rd
2008	Tennessee 6	Independent	Chris Baker	66,764	25.58 / 100	2nd
2008	Texas 1	Independent	Roger L. Owen	26,814	12.42 / 100	2nd
2008	Texas 2	Libertarian	Craig Wolfe	21,813	11.08 / 100	2nd
2008	Texas 5	Libertarian	Ken Ashby	31,967	25.58 / 100	2nd
2008	Texas 9	Libertarian	Brad Walters	9,760	6.35 / 100	2nd
2008	Texas 11	Libertarian	John R. Strohm	25,051	11.67 / 100	2nd
2008	Texas 15	Independent	Benjamin Eloy Mendoza	16,348	10.3 / 100	2nd
2008	Texas 15	Libertarian	Mette A. Baker	12,000	7.56 / 100	3rd
2008	Texas 21	Libertarian	James Arthur Strohm	60,879	20.0 / 100	2nd
2008	Utah 3	Constitution	Jim Noorlander	17,408	6.11 / 100	3rd
2008	Wisconsin 4	Independent	Michael D. LaForest	29,282	11.52 / 100	2nd
2008	Wisconsin 5	Independent	Robert R. Raymond	69,715	20.15 / 100	2nd
2009	California 32	Libertarian	Christopher Agrella	1,356	5.18 / 100	3rd
2009	Illinois 5	Green	Matt Reichel	2,911	6.6 / 100	3rd
2009	New York 23	Conservative	Doug Hoffman	69,553	45.98 / 100	2nd

== 2010 ==
Notable third-party House performances (2010) – 66 entries (Note: Include 1 special election in 2011.)
Year	District	Party	Candidate	# Votes	% Votes	Place
2010	Alabama 1	Constitution	David M. Walter	26,294	16.95 / 100	2nd
2010	Arizona 1	Libertarian	Nicole Patti	14,869	6.55 / 100	3rd
2010	Arizona 3	Libertarian	Michael Shoen	10,748	5.16 / 100	3rd
2010	California 4	Green	Benjamin Emery	22,179	7.29 / 100	3rd
2010	California 11	American Independent	David Christensen	12,439	5.17 / 100	3rd
2010	California 16	Libertarian	Edward M. Gonzalez	12,304	7.88 / 100	3rd
2010	California 26	American Independent	David L. Miller	12,784	6.14 / 100	3rd
2010	California 28	Libertarian	Carlos Rodriguez	10,229	8.05 / 100	3rd
2010	California 36	Libertarian	Herb Peters	10,840	5.64 / 100	3rd
2010	California 37	Independent	Nick Dibs	10,560	8.41 / 100	3rd
2010	California 42	Libertarian	Mark Lambert	12,115	5.93 / 100	3rd
2010	California 45	American Independent	Bill Lussenheide	13,188	6.38 / 100	3rd
2010	California 47	Independent	Ceci Iglesias	7,443	7.76 / 100	3rd
2010	Florida 1	Independent	Joe Cantrell	22,763	10.86 / 100	2nd
2010	Florida 1	Independent	John Krause	17,869	8.53 / 100	3rd
2010	Florida 6	Independent	Steven E. Schonberg	71,632	28.54 / 100	2nd
2010	Florida 17	Independent	Roderick Vereen	17,009	13.79 / 100	2nd
2010	Idaho 1	Independent	Dave Olson	14,365	5.81 / 100	3rd
2010	Idaho 2	Independent	Brian Schad	13,500	6.76 / 100	3rd
2010	Illinois 2	Green	Anthony Williams	10,564	5.65 / 100	3rd
2010	Illinois 3	Green	Laurel Lambert Schmidt	10,028	6.02 / 100	3rd
2010	Illinois 4	Green	Robert J. Burns	6,808	8.32 / 100	3rd
2010	Illinois 18	Green	Sheldon Schafer	11,256	5.09 / 100	3rd
2010	Indiana 4	Libertarian	John Duncan	10,423	5.15 / 100	3rd
2010	Indiana 5	Libertarian	Richard Reid	18,266	7.73 / 100	3rd
2010	Indiana 8	Libertarian	John Cunningham	10,240	5.03 / 100	3rd
2010	Indiana 9	Libertarian	Greg Knott	12,070	5.35 / 100	3rd
2010	Louisiana 4	Independent	Artis Cash	8,962	5.31 / 100	3rd
2010	Louisiana 5	Independent	Tom Gibbs Jr.	33,279	21.43 / 100	2nd
2010	Massachusetts 1	Independent	Michael Engel	10,841	5.11 / 100	3rd
2010	Massachusetts 9	Independent	Philip Dunkelbarger	12,833	5.6 / 100	3rd
2010	Massachusetts 10	Independent	Maryanne Lewis	16,673	5.9 / 100	3rd
2010	Minnesota 1	Independence	Steven Wilson	13,243	5.3 / 100	3rd
2010	Minnesota 4	Independence	Steve Carlson	14,207	6.15 / 100	3rd
2010	Minnesota 6	Independence	Bob Anderson	17,698	5.93 / 100	3rd
2010	Missouri 7	Libertarian	Kevin Craig	13,866	6.23 / 100	3rd
2010	Missouri 9	Libertarian	Christopher Dwyer	46,817	22.26 / 100	2nd
2010	Montana at-large	Libertarian	Mike Fellows	20,691	5.74 / 100	3rd
2010	Nebraska 3	Independent	Dan Hill	20,036	11.98 / 100	3rd
2010	New York 12	Conservative	Alice Gaffney	4,482	5.17 / 100	2nd
2010	New York 15	Independence	Craig Schley	6,865	6.14 / 100	3rd
2010	New York 23	Conservative	Douglas L. Hoffman	10,507	5.76 / 100	3rd
2010	Northern Mariana Islands at-large	Covenant	Joe Camacho	2,744	24.17 / 100	2nd
2010	Ohio 2	Libertarian	Marc Johnston	16,259	6.84 / 100	3rd
2010	Ohio 5	Libertarian	Brian Smith	11,831	5.7 / 100	3rd
2010	Ohio 16	Libertarian	Jeffery Blevins	14,342	6.63 / 100	3rd
2010	Oklahoma 1	Independent	Angelia O'Dell	45,656	23.2 / 100	2nd
2010	Pennsylvania 15	Independent	Jake Towne	15,248	7.45 / 100	3rd
2010	Rhode Island 2	Independent	John O. Matson	14,584	8.35 / 100	3rd
2010	South Carolina 4	Constitution	Dave Edwards	11,059	5.1 / 100	3rd
2010	South Dakota at-large	Independent	B. Thomas Marking	19,134	5.99 / 100	3rd
2010	Tennessee 3	Independent	Savas T. Kryiakidis	17,077	10.54 / 100	3rd
2010	Texas 1	Libertarian	Charles F. Parkes III	14,811	10.27 / 100	2nd
2010	Texas 2	Libertarian	David W. Smith	16,711	11.39 / 100	2nd
2010	Texas 7	Libertarian	Bob Townsend	31,704	17.98 / 100	2nd
2010	Texas 13	Independent	Keith Dyer	11,192	8.61 / 100	2nd
2010	Texas 16	Libertarian	Bill Collins	4,319	5.09 / 100	3rd
2010	Texas 24	Libertarian	David Sparks	22,609	18.43 / 100	2nd
2010	Texas 27	Libertarian	Ed Mishou	5,372	5.04 / 100	3rd
2010	Texas 31	Libertarian	Bill Oliver	26,735	17.46 / 100	2nd
2010	Virginia 6	Independent	Jeffrey Vanke	21,649	12.95 / 100	2nd
2010	Virginia 6	Libertarian	Stuart Bain	15,309	9.16 / 100	3rd
2010	Virginia 7	Independent Green	Floyd Bayne	15,164	6.5 / 100	3rd
2010	Virgin Islands at-large	Independent	Jeffrey Moorhead	4,880	18.7 / 100	2nd
2010	Washington 7	Independent	Bob Jeffers-Schroder	47,741	17.03 / 100	2nd
2011	New York 26	Tea Party	Jack Davis	10,029	8.99 / 100	3rd

== 2012 ==
Notable third-party House performances (2012) – 54 entries
Year	District	Party	Candidate	# Votes	% Votes	Place
2012	Alaska at-large	Libertarian	Jim McDermott	15,028	5.19 / 100	3rd
2012	Arizona 1	Libertarian	Kim Allen	15,227	6.05 / 100	3rd
2012	Arizona 7	Libertarian	Joe Cobb	23,338	18.25 / 100	2nd
2012	Arizona 9	Libertarian	Powell E. Gammill	16,620	6.64 / 100	3rd
2012	Arkansas 3	Green	Rebekah Kennedy	39,318	16.01 / 100	2nd
2012	Arkansas 3	Libertarian	David Pangrac	19,875	8.09 / 100	3rd
2012	California 13	Independent	Marilyn M. Singleton	38,146	13.22 / 100	2nd
2012	California 23	Independent	Terry Phillips	57,842	26.78 / 100	2nd
2012	California 29	Independent	David R. Hernandez	38,994	25.94 / 100	2nd
2012	California 33	Independent	Bill Bloomfield	146,660	46.04 / 100	2nd
2012	Colorado 5	Independent	Dave Anderson	53,318	17.35 / 100	2nd
2012	Colorado 5	Libertarian	Jim Pirtle	22,778	7.41 / 100	3rd
2012	Colorado 5	Green	Misha Luzov	18,284	5.95 / 100	4th
2012	District of Columbia at-large	Libertarian	Bruce Majors	16,254	5.93 / 100	2nd
2012	Florida 4	Independent	Jim Klauder	75,236	23.83 / 100	2nd
2012	Florida 20	Independent	Randall Terry	29,553	12.1 / 100	2nd
2012	Florida 21	Independent	W. Michael Trout	37,776	13.28 / 100	2nd
2012	Florida 21	Independent	Cesar Henao	25,361	8.92 / 100	3rd
2012	Florida 25	Independent	Stanley Blumenthal	31,664	15.81 / 100	2nd
2012	Florida 25	Independent	Eddie Gonzalez (VoteForEddie.com)	17,099	8.54 / 100	3rd
2012	Illinois 2	Independent	Marcus Lewis	40,006	13.44 / 100	3rd
2012	Illinois 5	Green	Nancy Wade	15,359	5.68 / 100	3rd
2012	Illinois 12	Green	Paula Bradshaw	17,045	5.61 / 100	3rd
2012	Illinois 13	Independent	John Hartman	21,319	7.24 / 100	3rd
2012	Indiana 6	Libertarian	Rex Bell	15,962	5.8 / 100	3rd
2012	Kansas 3	Libertarian	Joel Balam	92,675	31.55 / 100	2nd
2012	Kansas 4	Libertarian	Thomas Jefferson	16,058	6.2 / 100	3rd
2012	Louisiana 4	Libertarian	Randall Lord	61,637	24.7 / 100	2nd
2012	Louisiana 5	Independent	Ron Caesar	37,486	14.41 / 100	2nd
2012	Louisiana 5	Libertarian	Clay Steven Grant	20,194	7.76 / 100	3rd
2012	Louisiana 6	Libertarian	Rufus Holt Craig	32,185	10.49 / 100	2nd
2012	Louisiana 6	Independent	Richard Torregano	30,975	10.1 / 100	3rd
2012	Massachusetts 7	Independent	Karla Romero	41,199	16.29 / 100	2nd
2012	Massachusetts 9	Independent	Daniel Botelho	32,655	9.09 / 100	3rd
2012	Minnesota 4	Independence	Steve Carlson	21,135	6.07 / 100	3rd
2012	Mississippi 3	Reform	John Luke Pannell	58,605	19.98 / 100	2nd
2012	Mississippi 4	Libertarian	Ron Williams	17,982	6.3 / 100	3rd
2012	Missouri 7	Libertarian	Kevin Craig	16,668	5.23 / 100	3rd
2012	New York 4	Conservative	Frank Scaturro	15,603	5.88 / 100	3rd
2012	New York 7	Conservative	James Murray	7,816	5.24 / 100	2nd
2012	New York 24	Green	Ursula Rozum	22,670	7.74 / 100	3rd
2012	Ohio 4	Libertarian	Chris Kalla	16,141	5.16 / 100	3rd
2012	Puerto Rico at-large	New Progressive	Pedro Pierluisi	905,066	48.44 / 100	**Elected**
2012	Puerto Rico at-large	Popular Democratic	Rafael Cox Alomar	881,181	47.16 / 100	2nd
2012	Rhode Island 1	Independent	David S. Vogel	12,504	6.1 / 100	3rd
2012	Rhode Island 2	Independent	Abel G. Collins	20,212	9.08 / 100	3rd
2012	South Carolina 6	Green	Nammu Y. Muhammad	12,920	5.53 / 100	2nd
2012	Tennessee 6	Independent	Scott Beasley	34,766	14.41 / 100	2nd
2012	Tennessee 6	Green	Pat Riley	22,092	9.16 / 100	3rd
2012	Texas 13	Libertarian	John Robert Deek	12,701	6.15 / 100	2nd
2012	Texas 17	Libertarian	Ben Easton	35,978	20.07 / 100	2nd
2012	Texas 19	Libertarian	Richard Peterson	28,824	15.01 / 100	2nd
2012	Texas 29	Libertarian	James Stanczak	4,996	5.23 / 100	2nd
2012	U.S. Virgin Islands at-large	Independent	Warren Mosler	3,276	17.09 / 100	2nd

== 2014 ==
Notable third-party House performances (2014) – 67 entries
Year	District	Party	Candidate	# Votes	% Votes	Place
2014	Alaska at-large	Libertarian	Jim McDermott	21,290	7.61 / 100	3rd
2014	Arizona 7	Libertarian	Joe Cobb	10,715	14.79 / 100	2nd
2014	Arizona 7	Americans Elect	Rebecca Dewitt	3,858	5.32 / 100	3rd
2014	Arizona 8	Americans Elect	Stephen Dolgos	41,066	24.04 / 100	2nd
2014	Arkansas 3	Libertarian	Grant Brand	39,305	20.59 / 100	2nd
2014	California 5	Independent	James Hinton	41,535	24.27 / 100	2nd
2014	California 20	Independent	Ronald Paul Kabat	35,010	24.82 / 100	2nd
2014	California 28	Independent	Steve Stokes	28,268	23.5 / 100	2nd
2014	California 33	Independent	Marianne Williamson	14,335	13.2 / 100	4th
2014	California 44	Peace and Freedom	Adam Shbeita	9,192	13.35 / 100	2nd
2014	District of Columbia at-large	Independent	Tim Krepp	9,101	5.29 / 100	3rd
2014	Florida 1	Independent	Mark Wichern	15,281	6.49 / 100	3rd
2014	Florida 4	Independent	Paula Moser-Bartlett	35,663	15.69 / 100	2nd
2014	Florida 4	Independent	Gary L. Koniz	13,690	6.02 / 100	3rd
2014	Florida 13	Libertarian	Lucas Overby	55,318	24.74 / 100	2nd
2014	Illinois 5	Green	Nancy Wade	11,305	6.14 / 100	3rd
2014	Illinois 12	Green	Paula Bradshaw	11,840	5.65 / 100	3rd
2014	Indiana 3	Libertarian	Scott Wise	11,130	7.48 / 100	3rd
2014	Louisiana 2	Independent	David Brooks	16,327	7.37 / 100	3rd
2014	Louisiana 2	Libertarian	Samuel Davenport	15,237	6.88 / 100	4th
2014	Louisiana 3	Independent	Russell Richard	28,342	12.0 / 100	2nd
2014	Louisiana 4	Libertarian	Randall Lord	55,236	26.57 / 100	2nd
2014	Maine 1	Independent	Richard P. Murphy	27,410	8.87 / 100	3rd
2014	Maine 2	Independent	Blaine Richardson	31,337	11.05 / 100	3rd
2014	Minnesota 2	Independence	Paula Overby	12,319	5.01 / 100	3rd
2014	Minnesota 4	Independence	Dave Thomas	14,059	5.82 / 100	3rd
2014	Minnesota 5	Independence	Lee Bauer	12,001	5.08 / 100	3rd
2014	Minnesota 6	Independence	John Denney	12,457	5.26 / 100	3rd
2014	Mississippi 2	Independent	Troy Ray	36,465	24.53 / 100	2nd
2014	Mississippi 2	Reform	Shelly Shoemake	11,493	7.73 / 100	3rd
2014	Missouri 1	Libertarian	Robb E. Cunningham	8,906	5.45 / 100	3rd
2014	Missouri 4	Libertarian	Herschel L. Young	9,793	5.56 / 100	3rd
2014	Missouri 7	Libertarian	Kevin Craig	12,584	7.68 / 100	3rd
2014	Nebraska 2	Libertarian	Steven Laird	9,021	5.27 / 100	3rd
2014	Nevada 2	Independent American	Janine Hansen	11,792	6.33 / 100	3rd
2014	New York 8	Conservative	Alan Bellone	6,286	7.15 / 100	2nd
2014	New York 9	Conservative	Daniel G. Cavanagh	9,149	9.54 / 100	2nd
2014	New York 10	Conservative	Ross Brady	11,284	10.7 / 100	2nd
2014	New York 13	Green	Daniel Vila Rivera	9,231	10.72 / 100	2nd
2014	New York 21	Green	Matthew J. Funiciello	18,404	10.9 / 100	3rd
2014	North Dakota at-large	Libertarian	Jack Seaman	14,531	5.84 / 100	3rd
2014	Northern Mariana Islands at-large	Independent	Gregorio Sablan	8,549	65.29 / 100	**Elected**
2014	Ohio 8	Constitution	James J. Condit Jr.	10,257	5.45 / 100	3rd
2014	Oklahoma 2	Independent	John Douthitt	8,518	5.38 / 100	3rd
2014	Pennsylvania 10	Independent	Nicholas Troiano	22,734	12.61 / 100	3rd
2014	South Carolina 4	Libertarian	Curtis E. McLaughlin Jr.	21,969	14.74 / 100	2nd
2014	Tennessee 1	Independent	Robert D. Franklin	9,906	7.09 / 100	2nd
2014	Tennessee 1	Green	Robert N. Smith	9,869	7.08 / 100	3rd
2014	Tennessee 4	Independent	Robert Rankin Doggart	9,246	6.36 / 100	3rd
2014	Tennessee 6	Independent	Mike Winton	9,634	5.94 / 100	3rd
2014	Texas 3	Green	Paul Blair	24,876	17.99 / 100	2nd
2014	Texas 5	Libertarian	Ken Ashby	15,264	14.64 / 100	2nd
2014	Texas 8	Libertarian	Ken Petty	14,947	10.68 / 100	2nd
2014	Texas 9	Libertarian	Johnny Johnson	7,894	9.18 / 100	2nd
2014	Texas 11	Libertarian	Ryan T. Lange	11,635	9.73 / 100	2nd
2014	Texas 20	Libertarian	Jeffrey C. Blunt	21,410	24.34 / 100	2nd
2014	Texas 21	Green	Antonio Diaz	27,831	14.73 / 100	2nd
2014	Texas 21	Libertarian	Ryan Shields	25,505	13.49 / 100	3rd
2014	Texas 26	Libertarian	Mark Boler	24,526	17.34 / 100	2nd
2014	Texas 28	Libertarian	William Aikens	10,153	13.34 / 100	2nd
2014	Texas 29	Libertarian	James Stanczak	9,822	20.45 / 100	2nd
2014	Texas 30	Libertarian	Max W. Koch III	7,154	6.76 / 100	2nd
2014	Texas 30	Independent	Eric LeMonte Williams	5,598	5.29 / 100	3rd
2014	Texas 33	Libertarian	Jason Reeves	6,823	13.49 / 100	2nd
2014	Virginia 6	Libertarian	Will Hammer	22,161	12.33 / 100	2nd
2014	Virginia 6	Independent Green	Elaine Hildebrandt	21,447	11.93 / 100	3rd
2014	Virginia 9	Independent	William Carr	39,412	24.21 / 100	2nd

== 2016 ==
Notable third-party House performances (2016) – 68 entries (Note: Include 2 special elections in 2017.)
Year	District	Party	Candidate	# Votes	% Votes	Place
2016	Alabama 2	Independent (Write-In)	Rebecca Gerritson	25,027	9.05 / 100	3rd
2016	Alaska at-large	Libertarian	Jim McDermott	31,770	10.31 / 100	3rd
2016	Arizona 1	Green	Ray Parrish	16,746	5.97 / 100	3rd
2016	Arizona 8	Green	Mark Salazar	93,954	31.43 / 100	2nd
2016	Arkansas 1	Libertarian	Mark West	57,181	23.72 / 100	2nd
2016	Arkansas 3	Libertarian	Steve Isaacson	63,715	22.68 / 100	2nd
2016	Arkansas 4	Libertarian	Kerry Hicks	61,274	25.1 / 100	2nd
2016	California 12	Independent	Preston Picus	41,618	18.36 / 100	2nd
2016	California 40	Independent	Roman Gabriel Gonzalez	28,593	28.05 / 100	2nd
2016	Colorado 2	Libertarian	Richard Longstreth	27,136	5.93 / 100	3rd
2016	Colorado 3	Libertarian	Gaylon Kent	18,903	5.05 / 100	3rd
2016	Colorado 5	Libertarian	Mike McRedmond	24,872	6.87 / 100	3rd
2016	District of Columbia at-large	Libertarian	Martin Moulton	18,713	6.22 / 100	2nd
2016	Colorado 7	Libertarian	Martin L. Buchanan	18,186	5.02 / 100	3rd
2016	Florida 26	Independent	Jose Peixoto	16,502	5.88 / 100	2nd
2016	Idaho 2	Constitution	Anthony Tomkins	25,005	7.67 / 100	3rd
2016	Illinois 12	Green	Paula Bradshaw	18,780	6.0 / 100	3rd
2016	Indiana 1	Libertarian	Donna Dunn	47,051	18.48 / 100	2nd
2016	Indiana 3	Libertarian	Pepper Snyder	19,828	6.9 / 100	3rd
2016	Indiana 9	Libertarian	Russel Brooksbank	17,425	5.4 / 100	3rd
2016	Kansas 1	Independent	Alan LaPolice	67,739	26.26 / 100	2nd
2016	Kansas 1	Libertarian	Kerry Burt	19,366	7.51 / 100	3rd
2016	Kansas 2	Libertarian	James Bales	19,333	6.5 / 100	3rd
2016	Kansas 3	Libertarian	Steve Hohe	27,791	8.1 / 100	3rd
2016	Kansas 4	Independent	Miranda Allen	19,021	6.91 / 100	3rd
2016	Massachusetts 1	Independent	Frederick O. Mayock	57,226	18.0 / 100	2nd
2016	Massachusetts 1	Libertarian	Thomas Simmons	27,427	8.63 / 100	3rd
2016	Massachusetts 9	Independent	Paul Harrington	26,086	6.92 / 100	3rd
2016	Minnesota 2	Independence	Paula Overby	28,507	7.8 / 100	3rd
2016	Minnesota 4	Legal Marijuana Now	Susan Pendergast Sindt	27,100	7.74 / 100	3rd
2016	Minnesota 5	Legal Marijuana Now	Dennis Schuller	30,758	8.51 / 100	3rd
2016	Mississippi 4	Libertarian	Ric McCluskey	14,687	5.27 / 100	3rd
2016	Missouri 7	Libertarian	Benjamin T. Brixey	17,076	5.06 / 100	3rd
2016	Nevada 1	Independent	Reuben D'Silva	13,897	7.38 / 100	3rd
2016	New Hampshire 1	Independent	Shawn Patrick O'Connor	34,612	9.45 / 100	3rd
2016	New York 8	Conservative	Daniel J. Cavanagh	14,468	6.75 / 100	2nd
2016	New York 9	Conservative	Alan Bellone	16,617	7.66 / 100	2nd
2016	New York 16	Independent (Note: Listed on ballot as "People's Choice.")	Derickson K. Lawrence	10,840	5.33 / 100	2nd
2016	New York 22	Reform	Martin Babinec	32,303	12.57 / 100	3rd
2016	North Dakota at-large	Libertarian	Jack Seaman	23,528	6.95 / 100	3rd
2016	Northern Mariana Islands at-large	Independent	Gregorio Sablan	10,605	100.0 / 100	**Elected**
2016	Ohio 7	Independent	Dan Phillip	21,694	7.01 / 100	3rd
2016	Oklahoma 2	Independent	John McCarthy	16,644	6.19 / 100	3rd
2016	Oklahoma 5	Libertarian	Zachary Knight	17,113	6.1 / 100	3rd
2016	Oregon 3	Independent	David Walker	74,807	20.17 / 100	2nd
2016	Oregon 3	Progressive	David Delk	26,979	7.27 / 100	3rd
2016	Rhode Island 2	Independent	Jeffrey C. Johnson	16,253	7.09 / 100	3rd
2016	Tennessee 1	Independent	Robert Franklin	15,673	6.2 / 100	3rd
2016	Tennessee 6	Independent	David Ross	20,241	7.12 / 100	3rd
2016	Texas 4	Libertarian	Cody Wommack	29,577	12.01 / 100	2nd
2016	Texas 5	Libertarian	Ken Ashby	37,406	19.39 / 100	2nd
2016	Texas 11	Libertarian	Nicholas Landholt	23,677	10.5 / 100	2nd
2016	Texas 13	Libertarian	Calvin DeWeese	14,725	6.66 / 100	2nd
2016	Texas 16	Libertarian	Jaime O. Perez	17,491	9.98 / 100	2nd
2016	Texas 19	Libertarian	Troy Bonar	17,376	8.54 / 100	2nd
2016	Texas 20	Libertarian	Jeffrey C. Blunt	29,055	15.48 / 100	2nd
2016	Texas 31	Libertarian	Scott J. Ballard	14,676	5.16 / 100	3rd
2016	Texas 32	Libertarian	Ed Rankin	43,490	18.98 / 100	2nd
2016	Texas 32	Green	Gary Stuard	22,813	9.96 / 100	3rd
2016	Texas 36	Green	Hal J. Ridley Jr.	24,890	11.39 / 100	2nd
2016	Utah 1	Libertarian	Craig Bowden	16,296	5.87 / 100	3rd
2016	Vermont at-large	Liberty Union	Erica Clawson	29,410	9.96 / 100	2nd
2016	West Virginia 3	Libertarian	Zane R. Lawhorn	16,777	8.15 / 100	3rd
2016	Wisconsin 4	Independent	Robert R. Raymond	33,494	11.67 / 100	2nd
2016	Wisconsin 4	Libertarian	Andy Craig	32,183	11.22 / 100	3rd
2016	Wisconsin 6	Independent	Jeff Dahlke	19,716	5.52 / 100	3rd
2017	Montana at-large	Libertarian	Mark Wicks	21,682	5.66 / 100	3rd
2017	Utah 3	United Utah	Jim Bennett	13,745	9.3 / 100	3rd

== 2018 ==
Notable third-party House performances (2018) – 29 entries (Note: Include 1 special election.)
Year	District	Party	Candidate	# Votes	% Votes	Place
2018	Alaska at-large	Independent/Undeclared	Alyse Galvin (Note: Also listed as the de facto Democratic nominee.)	109,615	45.84 / 100	2nd
2018	Arizona 7	Green	Gary Swing	17,194	14.31 / 100	2nd
2018	California 5	No party preference	Anthony Mills	37,676	21.8 / 100	2nd
2018	California 13	Green	Laura Wells	21,183	11.8 / 100	2nd
2018	California 20	No party preference	Ronald Paul Kabat	27,522	20.7 / 100	2nd
2018	California 34	Green	Kenneth Mejia	26,160	26.0 / 100	2nd
2018	California 40	Green	Rodolfo Cortez Barragan	18,131	22.2 / 100	2nd
2018	Florida 23	Independent	Tim Canova	13,676	5.0 / 100	3rd
2018	Illinois 1	Independent	Thomas Rudbeck	16,752	6.8 / 100	2nd
2018	Kansas 2	Libertarian	Kelly Standley	14,402	5.54 / 100	3rd
2018	Louisiana 2	Independent	Jesse Schmidt	20,463	8.7 / 100	2nd
2018	Louisiana 2	Independent	Belden "Noonie Man" Batiste	17,255	7.3 / 100	3rd
2018	Maine 1	Independent	Marty Grohman	29,569	8.7 / 100	3rd
2018	Maine 2	Independent	Tiffany Bond	16,208	5.8 / 100	3rd
2018	Michigan 13 (special)	U.S. Taxpayers	Marc Sosnowski	17,094	8.9 / 100	2nd
2018	Michigan 13	Working Class	Sam Johnson	21,978	11.3 / 100	2nd
2018	Mississippi 2	Independent	Troy Ray	45,277	21.7 / 100	2nd
2018	Mississippi 2	Reform	Irving Harris	14,354	6.5 / 100	3rd
2018	New Mexico 3	Libertarian	Christopher Manning	13,185	5.4 / 100	3rd
2018	New York 6	Green	Tom Hillgardner	10,582	9.15 / 100	2nd
2018	New York 7	Conservative (NY)	Joseph Lieberman	8,107	5.5 / 100	2nd
2018	New York 14	Working Families	Joe Crowley (Note: Lost bid for the Democratic renomination. Listed on ballot as the de facto Working Families nominee.)	8,505	6.62 / 100	3rd
2018	New York 17	Reform	Joe Ciardullo	21,674	12.05 / 100	2nd
2018	Oregon 3	Independent (OR)	Mark Koller (Note: Co-nominated by Pacific Green Party and Oregon Progressive Party.)	20,798	5.51 / 100	3rd
2018	Texas 20	Libertarian	Jeffrey Blunt	32,727	19.1 / 100	2nd
2018	Texas 28	Libertarian	Arthur Thomas IV	21,647	15.59 / 100	2nd
2018	Texas 30	Libertarian	Shawn Jones	16,318	8.95 / 100	2nd
2018	Utah 1	United Utah	Eric Eliason	21,872	11.05 / 100	3rd
2018	Washington 2	Libertarian	Brian Luke	78,928	28.5 / 100	2nd

== 2020 ==
Notable third-party House performances (2020) – 18 entries
Year	District	Party	Candidate	# Votes	% Votes	Place
2020	Alaska at-large	Independent/Undeclared	Alyse Galvin	159,856	45.3 / 100	2nd
2020	District of Columbia at-large	Libertarian Party	Patrick Hynes	9,678	2.96 / 100	2nd
2020	Illinois 7	Independent	Tracy Jennings	19,355	6.24 / 100	3rd
2020	Illinois 8	Libertarian	Preston Gabriel Nelson	68,327	26.84 / 100	2nd
2020	Massachusetts 7	Independent	Roy A. Owens Sr.	38,675	12.5 / 100	2nd
2020	Massachusetts 8	Independent	Jonathan D. Lott	72,060	18.7 / 100	2nd
2020	Minnesota 1	Grassroots	Bill Rood	21,448	5.8 / 100	3rd
2020	Minnesota 2	Legal Marijuana Now	Adam Charles Weeks (Note: Died before election.)	24,751	5.8 / 100	3rd
2020	Minnesota 4	Grassroots	Susan Sindt	29,537	7.6 / 100	3rd
2020	Minnesota 5	Legal Marijuana Now	Michael Moore	37,979	9.5 / 100	3rd
2020	Minnesota 8	Grassroots	Judith Schwartzbacker	22,190	5.6 / 100	3rd
2020	New York 16	Conservative	Patrick McManus	41,085	15.8 / 100	2nd
2020	Puerto Rico at-large	Citizens' Victory Movement	Zayira Jordán Conde	154,751	12.9 / 100	3rd
2020	Puerto Rico at-large	Project Dignity	Ada Norah Henriquez	90,457	7.8 / 100	4th
2020	Puerto Rico at-large	Puerto Rican Independence	Luis Roberto Piñero	76,398	6.4 / 100	5th
2020	Rhode Island 1	Independent	Jeffrey Lemire	35,457	15.8 / 100	2nd
2020	Rhode Island 1	Independent	Frederick Wysocki	28,300	12.6 / 100	3rd
2020	South Dakota at-large	Libertarian	Randy Luallin	75,748	19.04 / 100	2nd
2020	Texas 33	Independent	Carlos Quintanilla	8,071	5.1 / 100	3rd
2020	Virgin Islands at-large	Independent	Shekima George	1,992	11.34 / 100	2nd

== 2022 ==
Notable third-party House performances (2022) – 19 entries
Year	District	Party	Candidate	# Votes	% Votes	Place
2022	Alabama 1	Libertarian	Alexander Remrey	26,197	15.7 / 100	2nd
2022	Alabama 6	Libertarian	Andria Chieffo	27,792	15.1 / 100	2nd
2022	Arizona 5	Independent	Clint Smith	18,581	5.9 / 100	3rd
2022	California 10	Green	Michael Kerr	52,904	21.1 / 100	2nd
2022	Florida 6	Libertarian	Joe Hannoush	74,207	24.7 / 100	2nd
2022	Florida 18	Independent	Keith Hayden	56,647	25.3 / 100	2nd
2022	Louisiana 6	Libertarian	Rufus Craig	30,709	13.0 / 100	2nd
2022	Maine 2	Independent	Tiffany Bond	21,555	6.9 / 100	3rd
2022	Minnesota 7	Legal Marijuana Now	Travis Johnson	16,421	5.4 / 100	3rd
2022	Montana 2	Independent	Gary Buchanan	46,917	21.9 / 100	2nd
2022	Nebraska 3	Legal Marijuana Now	Mark Elworth Jr.	12,982	5.9 / 100	3rd
2022	New York 9	Conservative	Menachem Raitport	24,123	15.3 / 100	2nd
2022	North Dakota at-large	Independent	Cara Mund	89,644	37.6 / 100	2nd
2022	South Dakota at-large	Libertarian	Collin Duprel	27,020	22.6 / 100	2nd
2022	Texas 19	Independent	Nathan Lewis	37,158	19.6 / 100	2nd
2022	Texas 26	Libertarian	Mike Kolls	81,208	30.7 / 100	2nd
2022	Utah 4	United Utah	January Walker	16,717	6.6 / 100	3rd
2022	Wisconsin 8	Independent	Paul Boucher	48,757	16.0 / 100	2nd
2022	Wisconsin 8	Libertarian	Jacob VandenPlas	32,043	10.5 / 100	3rd

== 2024 ==
Notable third-party House performances (2024) – 21 entries
Year	District	Party	Candidate	# Votes	% Votes	Place
2024 (special)	Colorado 4	Libertarian	Hannah Goodman	8,628	5.3 / 100	3rd
2024	California 37	No party preference (Note: Rey is a member of the Working Class Party, but ran as No Party Preference because the Working Class Party does not currently have ballot access in California.)	Juan Rey	42,547	21.5 / 100	2nd
2024	District of Columbia at-large	DC Statehood Green	Kymone Freeman	21,114	6.9 / 100	2nd
2024	District of Columbia at-large	Independent	Michael A. Brown	18,738	6.2 / 100	4th
2024	Idaho 2	Libertarian	Todd Corsetti	21,310	5.3 / 100	3rd
2024	Illinois 4	Working Class	Ed Hershey	11,293	5.1 / 100	3rd
2024	Maine 1	Independent	Ethan Alcorn	19,778	5.1 / 100	3rd
2024	Massachusetts 1	Independent	Nadia Milleron	88,842	36.3 / 100	2nd
2024	Massachusetts 2	Independent	Cornelius Shea	87,837	31.7 / 100	2nd
2024	Nevada 2	Independent	Greg Kidd	139,095	36.0 / 100	2nd
2024	North Carolina 3	Libertarian	Gheorghe Cormos	71,394	22.5 / 100	2nd
2024	North Carolina 6	Constitution	Kevin Hayes	103,247	30.8 / 100	2nd
2024	North Carolina 9	Independent	Shelane Etchison	21,874	5.9 / 100	3rd
2024	Ohio 7	Independent	Dennis Kucinich	50,321	12.8 / 100	3rd
2024	Oklahoma 1	Independent	Mark Sanders	15,766	5.0 / 100	3rd
2024	Oklahoma 4	Independent	James Stacy	19,870	6.5 / 100	3rd
2024	Texas 19	Independent	Nathan Lewis	27,386	10.3 / 100	2nd
2024	Texas 19	Libertarian	Bernard Johnson	23,889	9.0 / 100	3rd
2024	Texas 30	Libertarian	Jrmar Jefferson	34,906	15.1 / 100	2nd
2024	Utah 2	Constitution	Cassie Easley	18,897	5.5 / 100	3rd
2024	Vermont at-large	Independent	Adam Ortiz	19,284	5.5 / 100	3rd
2024	West Virginia 1	Independent	Wes Holden	25,595	7.4 / 100	3rd

== 2026 ==
Notable third-party House performances (2026) – 18 entries
Year	District	Party	Candidate	# Votes	% Votes	Place
2026	Alaska at-large	Nonpartisan	Bill Hill	116,932	41.7 / 100	2nd
2026	Alaska at-large (RCV)	Nonpartisan	Bill Hill	132,961	48.7 / 100	2nd
2026	Arizona 3	No Labels	Alan Aversa	9,068	6.1 / 100	2nd
2026	Arizona 3	Green	David Redkey	7,782	5.2 / 100	3rd
2026	California 6	No party preference	Kevin Kiley	110,876	41.1 / 100	2nd
2026	Colorado 1	Independent	Shimon Blau	16,650	5.5 / 100	3rd
2026	District of Columbia at-large	DC Statehood Green	Kymone Freeman	12,114	5.8 / 100	3rd
2026	Idaho 1	Independent	Sarah Zabel	23,106	6.1 / 100	3rd
2026	Illinois 4	Independent	Chris Getty	14,920	9.2 / 100	3rd
2026	Massachusetts 1	Independent	Nadia Milleron	93,791	34.6 / 100	2nd
2026	Minnesota 5	Independent	DeVelle Jackson	24,110	7.0 / 100	3rd
2026	Montana 2	Independent	Michael Eisenhauer	17,196	7.8 / 100	3rd
2026	Nevada 2	Independent American	Lynn Chapman	17,636	5.5 / 100	3rd
2026	New York 15	PSL	Andre Easton	10,647	8.7 / 100	3rd
2026	Northern Mariana Islands at-large	Independent	Galvin Deleon Guerrero	4,675	36.3 / 100	2nd
2026	Pennsylvania 3	Independent	Dennis Mahoney	17,619	6.4 / 100	2nd
2026	Virgin Islands at-large	Independent	Shelley Moorhead	3,586	21.2 / 100	2nd
2026	Wyoming at-large	Libertarian	Shawn Johnson	13,667	7.4 / 100	3rd
