= List of oldest buildings in Alabama =

This article attempts to list the oldest extant buildings in the state of Alabama in the United States. Some dates are approximate and based upon dendochronology, architectural studies, and historical records. The area that is now Alabama was originally inhabited by Native Americans. The settlement of Mobile began in 1702 as the first capital of the colony of French Louisiana, and the region was colonized and traded between French, British, Spanish, and American forces during the 1700s. No documented buildings remain standing in the state from this period, though Fort Toulouse has been accurately reconstructed. There is one remaining example nearby, the 1757 French colonial LaPointe-Krebs House in Pascagoula, Mississippi. The oldest existing structures within the state reflect a wave of American settlement into the Tennessee River valley, including the establishment of Huntsville in 1805.

To be listed here a site must:

- date to Alabama statehood in 1819 or prior; or
- be the oldest building in a region, large city, or oldest of its type (government building, style, etc.)

== List ==
Building	Image	Location	First built	Type	Notes
Mississippian Mounds, e.g. Moundville		Throughout state	800–1600	Earthen mounds	Though no original Native American buildings remain above ground, a number of constructed platform mounds have been preserved including the 58 ft tall Mound B at the Moundville Site.
Joel Eddins House		Huntsville	1808	House	The oldest documented building in the state. This European American influenced log cabin was moved from Ardmore, Alabama to its current location at Burritt on the Mountain museum in 2007.
Jude-Crutcher House		Huntsville	1812	House	Second oldest building and oldest surviving log dogtrot style house in the state. The breezeway has been enclosed and the exterior is now covered in clapboard. 2132 Winchester Rd NW, Huntsville AL, 35810
Poplar Grove (LeRoy Pope House)		Huntsville	1813	House	The third oldest building in the state, and the oldest masonry building in the state. Constructed by LeRoy Pope, the "Father of Huntsville", and visited by General Andrew Jackson on his return from the Battle of Horseshoe Bend. The original federal style facade has seen the later addition of a Greek Revival portico.
Urquhart House		Huntsville	1813	House	Tied with Poplar Grove as third oldest building in the state. Vacant. 199 Routt Rd, Toney, Alabama, 35773
Perkins-Winston House		Huntsville	1815	House	Early Huntsville home.
William Reed House		Birmingham	1816	House	Early homestead. 888 Twin Lake Dr NE Birmingham, AL 35215, United States
Hill of Howth		Boligee	1816	House	Early homestead.
Rev Thomas Newton House		Ashville	1817	House	Early homestead. Barton Lane, Asheville AL 35953, United States
Lucas Tavern (Old Alabama Town)		Montgomery	1818	Tavern/Inn	Oldest surviving tavern in the state and the oldest building in the city of Montgomery. It is famous for hosting the Marquis de Lafayette during his 1825 trip through Alabama. Now stands at Old Alabama Town.
John Looney House		Ashville	1818	House	The oldest two story dogtrot house in the state.
Cedarwood		Moundville	1818	House	Possibly the earliest surviving plantation in the black belt region of Alabama. Restored and relocated to The University of West Alabama in Livingston .
Hickman Cabin (Joseph Wheeler Plantation)		Wheeler	1818	House	A log dogtrot home.
Erskine House		Huntsville	1818	House	Early Huntsville home. 517 Franklin St SE, Huntsville, AL 35801, United States
Phelps-Jones House		Huntsville	1818	House	Early Huntsville home.
The Molett House		Orrville	1819	House	The oldest house in Alabama owned and occupied by the family that built it. It is also documented in the Historic American Buildings Survey (HABS), 1934.
Sadler House		McCalla	1819	House	This home may have originally consisted of an circa 1819 log pen that was later expanded upon.
Weeden House		Huntsville	1819	House	Early Huntsville home.
McGuire-Strickland House		Tuscaloosa	1820	House	The oldest building in the city of Tuscaloosa.
Goode–Hall House		Town Creek	1824	House	This Tennessee Valley plantation house is one of the deep South's outstanding expressions of Jeffersonian Palladian architecture.
G&J Sutherland Store		Tuscumbia	1824	Store	Possibly the state's oldest surviving commercial building. The white building in the picture, its exterior details have been changed with time.
Masonic Lodge #3		Perdue Hill	1824	Courthouse/Masonic Lodge	Former courthouse and Masonic lodge originally built in Claiborne, one of early Alabama's largest settlements. Visited and reportedly dedicated by the Marquis de Lafayette in 1825 during his tour of the United States. Moved to its present location in Perdue Hill in 1884.
Indian Springs Baptist Church		McWilliams	1825	Church	Possibly the state's oldest surviving religious building. Indian Springs Road, Beatrice, AL 36425, United States
Old Rock Jail		Rockford	1825	Jail	The state's oldest jail.
Lassiter House		Autaugaville	1825	House	One of the state's earliest examples of the I-house form.
Vincent-Doan House		Mobile	1827	House	The state's oldest surviving example of French colonial influenced architecture and the oldest building in the city of Mobile.
John McMahon House		Courtland	1828	House	Architecturally significant example of an early Alabama Federal-style structure that reflects the carryover of Atlantic Seaboard architectural forms introduced by Virginia settlers.
Bride's Hill		Wheeler	1828	House	Oldest surviving example of a Tidewater-type cottage in Alabama. Vacant.
Dancy-Polk House		Decatur	1829	House	Oldest building in the city of Decatur.
Collins-Marston House		Mobile	1832	House	Possibly the state's oldest surviving example of a creole cottage style house.
Old State Bank		Decatur	1833	Bank	The first state bank and oldest bank building in the state.
Barton Academy		Mobile	1836	School	The first public school in the state of Alabama.
Somerville Courthouse		Somerville	1837	Courthouse	The oldest surviving masonry courthouse in the state. The structure bears much resemblance to the first Alabama state house, once located in Cahawba.
Arlington Antebellum Home & Gardens		Birmingham	1845	House	The oldest building in the city of Birmingham.
Langdon Hall		Auburn	1846	Church	The oldest building in the city of Auburn.
Old Shelby County Courthouse		Columbiana	1854	Courthouse	Original courthouse for the county of Shelby County, replaced by a larger marble courthouse in 1908. The structure still stands and is currently the Shelby County Museum and Archives.
Bryce Hospital		Tuscaloosa	1861	Mental Health Institution	Alabama's first and oldest state mental health facility.
Rickwood Field		Birmingham	1910	Baseball park	The oldest surviving professional baseball park in the United States.

== Demolished early Alabama buildings ==
Issac Bett House, Burnt Corn Alabama

The existing house once located at 308 Conti Street (now moved) in Mobile may contain portions of a 1796 structure.

Sandy Hill Plantation

The Oaks

Shelby Hotel

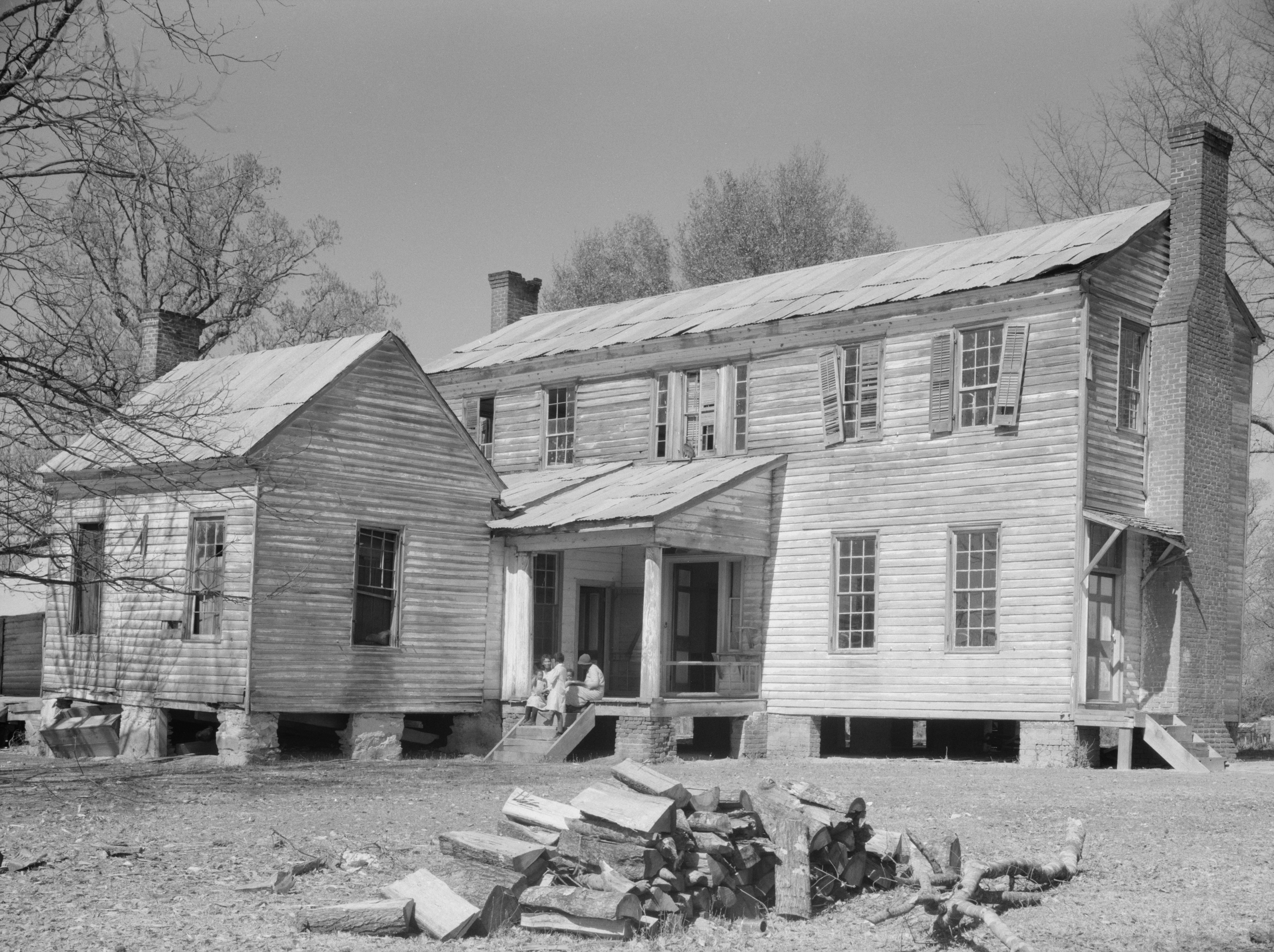
Sandy Hill Plantation (Pettway Plantation) built circa 1816.

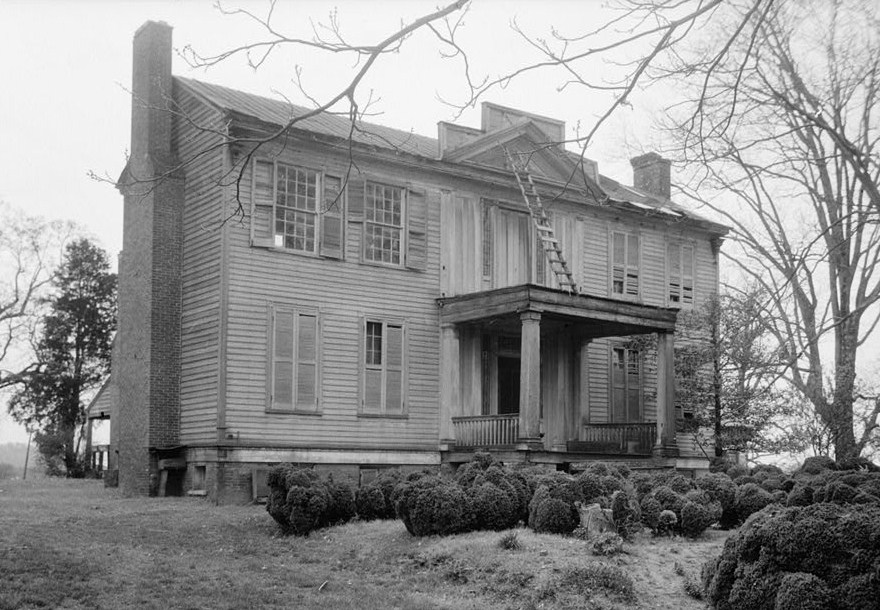
The Oaks built circa 1818.

== See also ==
- List of the oldest buildings in the United States
- History of Alabama
- List of the oldest buildings in Florida
- List of the oldest buildings in Georgia
- List of the oldest buildings in Mississippi
- List of the oldest buildings in Tennessee
- Timeline of architectural styles
- List of National Historic Landmarks in Alabama
- National Register of Historic Places listings in Alabama
- Alabama Register of Landmarks and Heritage
