= 1883 United States House of Representatives elections =

Historical US federal election

There were several special elections to the United States House of Representatives in 1883 during the 47th and 48th Congresses.

== 47th Congress ==
District	Incumbent			This race	
District	Member	Party	First elected	Results	Candidates
Alabama 8	William M. Lowe	Greenback	1878; 1880 (lost); 1882 (won election contest)	Incumbent died October 12, 1882. New member elected January 3, 1883 and seated January 15, 1883. Democratic gain. Winner was not elected to the next term on November 7, 1882, which had already been won by fellow Democrat Luke Pryor.	▌ ✓ Joseph Wheeler (Democratic) 62.14%; ▌John B. McClellan (Independent) 37.86%
Ohio 16	Jonathan T. Updegraff	Republican	1878	Incumbent died November 30, 1882. New member elected January 2, 1883. Republican hold. Winner also elected to the next term in the 17th district.	▌ ✓ Joseph D. Taylor (Republican) 53.52%; ▌Ross J. Alexander (Democratic) 46.48%
Indiana 9	Godlove S. Orth	Republican	1862; 1870 (retired); 1872; 1874 (retired); 1878	Incumbent died December 16, 1882. New member elected January 9, 1883 and seated January 17, 1883. Republican hold. Winner was not a candidate to the next term, see below.	▌ ✓ Charles T. Doxey (Republican) 53.33%; ▌Thomas B. Ward (Democratic) 46.67%

== 48th Congress ==
District	Incumbent			This race	
District	Member	Party	First elected	Results	Candidates
Ohio 17	Jonathan T. Updegraff	Republican	1878	Incumbent member-elect had been redistricted and re-elected but died November 30, 1882, before the term began. New member elected January 2, 1883 and seated December 3, 1883. Republican hold. Winner also elected to finish the current term in the 16th district.	▌ ✓ Joseph D. Taylor (Republican) 53.85%; ▌Ross J. Alexander (Democratic) 46.15%
West Virginia 3	John E. Kenna	Democratic	1876	Incumbent resigned March 4, 1883, when elected U.S. Senator. New member elected May 15, 1883 and seated December 3, 1883. Democratic hold.	▌ ✓ Charles P. Snyder (Democratic) 53.41%; ▌Louis Trager (Republican) 46.59%
Alabama 1	Thomas H. Herndon	Democratic	1878	Incumbent died March 28, 1883. New member elected July 3, 1883 and seated December 3, 1883. Democratic hold.	▌ ✓ James T. Jones (Democratic) 81.05%; ▌Philip Joseph (Republican) 18.95%
Iowa 6	Marsena E. Cutts	Republican	1880; 1883 (lost election contest); 1882	Incumbent died September 1, 1883. New member elected October 9, 1883 and seated December 3, 1883. Democratic gain. John C. Cook had successfully contested Cutts's 1880 election. Cook had beaten Cutts in the 1882 election, but Cutts, meanwhile, had already won election to the next term. So Cook only served one day: March 3, 1883, before the new term began. Cutts, however, never served in the new term, as he died of tuberculosis before being seated.	▌ ✓ John C. Cook (Democratic) 50.41%; ▌E. H. Stiles (Republican) 49.59%
Kansas 2	Dudley C. Haskell	Republican	1876	Incumbent died December 16, 1883. New member elected October 9, 1883 and seated March 21, 1884. Republican hold.	▌ ✓ Edward H. Funston (Republican) 57.36%; ▌Samuel A. Riggs (Democratic) 42.64%
North Carolina 1	Walter F. Pool	Republican	1882	Incumbent died August 25, 1883. New member elected November 20, 1883 and seated December 3, 1883. Democratic gain.	▌ ✓ Thomas G. Skinner (Democratic) 51.62%; ▌Charles C. Pool (Republican) 48.36%
