= National Register of Historic Places listings in Lawrence County, Alabama =

Location of Lawrence County in Alabama

This is a list of the National Register of Historic Places listings in Lawrence County, Alabama.

This is intended to be a complete list of the properties and districts on the National Register of Historic Places in Lawrence County, Alabama, United States. Latitude and longitude coordinates are provided for many National Register properties and districts; these locations may be seen together in an online map.

There are 12 properties and districts listed on the National Register in the county.

This National Park Service list is complete through NPS recent listings posted January 16, 2026.

== Current listings ==
	Name on the Register	Image	Date listed	Location	City or town	Description
1	Archeological Site No. 1LA102		December 14, 1985 (#85003117)	Address Restricted	Haleyville	
2	Boxwood Plantation Slave Quarter	Boxwood Plantation Slave Quarter	July 10, 2013 (#13000470)	20416 AL 20; 34°38′02″N 87°06′49″W	Courtland	
3	Bride's Hill	Bride's Hill	July 9, 1986 (#86001544)	Lock Rd. 34°40′13″N 87°14′40″W	Wheeler	A boundary decrease was approved June 3, 2025.
4	Courtland Historic District	Courtland Historic District	May 13, 1991 (#91000597)	Roughly bounded by Clinton, Madison, Van Buren, Jefferson, Ussery, Tennessee, Monroe and Academy Sts. 34°40′03″N 87°18′34″W	Courtland	Includes a boundary increase on June 26, 1998.
5	Goode-Hall House	Goode-Hall House	October 1, 1974 (#74000418)	North of Town Creek off State Route 101; 34°43′31″N 87°23′24″W	Town Creek	
6	Thomas Holland House	Thomas Holland House	October 1, 1991 (#91001478)	Off Alternate U.S. Route 72 south of Hillsboro; 34°35′45″N 87°12′20″W	Hillsboro	Destroyed by fire in 1997
7	Ice House	Ice House	June 22, 2000 (#00000712)	844 Seminary St. 34°28′56″N 87°17′24″W	Moulton	
8	Dr. Robert Price Irwin House		December 18, 2025 (#100012394)	560 Main Street; 34°28′43″N 87°17′28″W	Moulton	
9	John McMahon House	John McMahon House	December 11, 1987 (#87001454)	Junction of South Lane and Jefferson St. 34°40′07″N 87°18′21″W	Courtland	
10	Moulton Courthouse Square Historic District	Moulton Courthouse Square Historic District	August 14, 1998 (#98001026)	Roughly bounded by Lawrence, Main, Court, and Market Sts. 34°28′52″N 87°17′30″W	Moulton	
11	Wheeler Hydroelectric Project	Wheeler Hydroelectric Project	July 26, 2016 (#16000431)	24455 AL 101; 34°48′22″N 87°22′55″W	Rogersville	
12	Joseph Wheeler Plantation	Joseph Wheeler Plantation	April 13, 1977 (#77000209)	East of Courtland off State Route 20; 34°38′56″N 87°15′21″W	Wheeler	

== See also ==
- List of National Historic Landmarks in Alabama
- National Register of Historic Places listings in Alabama
