= 1910 Alabama House of Representatives election =

- November 8, 1910

All 106 seats in the Alabama House of Representatives 54 seats needed for a majority
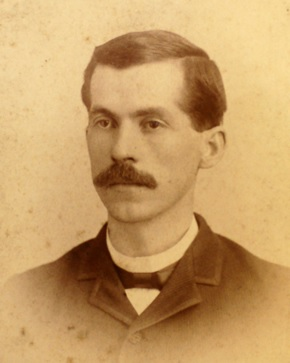

	Majority party	Minority party
Leader	Archibald H. Carmichael (did not stand)	—
Party	Democratic	Republican
Leader since	March 5, 1907	—
Leader's seat	Colbert Co.	—
Last election	104 seats	2 seats
Seats won	102	4
Seat change	▼2	▲2
- Results: Democratic gain Democratic hold Republican gain Republican hold
Speaker before election
Archibald H. Carmichael
Democratic
Elected Speaker
Edward B. Almon
Democratic

The 1910 Alabama House of Representatives election took place on Tuesday, November 8, 1910, to elect 106 representatives to serve four-year terms in the Alabama House of Representatives. 102 Democrats and 4 Republicans were elected to the 1911 House.

Newly-elected representative Edward B. Almon of Colbert County was elected speaker on the second ballot over J. Lee Long, 50 votes to 48, on January 10, 1911. Both had tied for 49 votes on the first ballot.

== General election results ==
Counties not listed were won by Democrats in both the 1906 and 1910 elections:

- Chilton: Republican W. L. Popwell was elected. (Note: Affiliation not listed in initial reports; identified as a Republican by 1912) Republican J. Osmond Middleton won this seat in 1906.
- Fayette: Republican Sim T. Wright was elected. Democrat W. M. Cannon won this seat in 1906.
- Shelby: Republican W. H. Sturdivant was elected. Democrat Hosea Parson won this seat in 1906.
- Winston: Republican James E. Edmunds was elected. Republican W. M. Barton won this seat in 1906.

== See also ==
- Category:1910 elections in Alabama
  - 1910 United States House of Representatives elections in Alabama
  - 1910 Alabama gubernatorial election
- 1910 United States elections
