= 1883 Alabama's 8th congressional district special election =

On January 3, 1883, Democrat Joseph Wheeler was elected to finish the term of Greenback William M. Lowe in the United States House of Representatives. He represented Alabama's 8th congressional district. He was seated January 15, 1883, for the term ending March 3, 1883.

== Background ==
In the 1878 United States House of Representatives elections, Lowe was elected to serve in the 46th United States Congress. He lost re-election to Wheeler in 1880, but successfully contested the election and was reseated June 3, 1882. Lowe then died October 12, 1882.

== Results ==
- ✓ Joseph Wheeler (Democratic) 62.14%
- John B. McClellan (Independent) 37.86%

== Next term ==
Wheeler had not been elected to the next term on November 7, 1882, which was won by fellow Democrat Luke Pryor.

== See also ==
- 1882 United States House of Representatives elections#Special elections
