= Sylvan Grove, Alabama =

Unincorporated community in Alabama, United States

- Unincorporated community
- Location within Alabama Location within the United States
- Coordinates: 31°21′14″N 85°27′56″W
- Country: United States
- State: Alabama
- County: Dale
- Elevation: 351 ft (107 m)
- Time zone: UTC-6 (Central (CST))
  - Summer (DST): UTC-5 (CDT)
- Area code: 334
- GNIS feature ID: 157138

Sylvan Grove, also spelled Sylvangrove, is an unincorporated community in Dale County, Alabama, United States.

== History ==
A post office operated under the name Sylvan Grove from 1858 to 1902.

A portion of the 15th Regiment Alabama Infantry came from Sylvan Grove.

== Notable person ==
- Archibald Hill Carmichael, politician who represented Alabama's 8th congressional district in the United States House of Representatives from November 1933 to January 1937. He was the son of Jesse Malcolm Carmichael, who served as State Auditor of Alabama from 1880 to 1884 and 1905–1907, and moved to Sylvan Grove from Georgia at a young age.
