= Eddins =

Eddins is a surname. Notable people with the surname include:

- Boyd L. Eddins (born 1933), American politician
- Rick L. Eddins, American politician
- Robert Eddins (1988–2016), American football linebacker
- William Eddins (born 1964), American pianist and conductor

== See also ==
- Joel Eddins House
