= William Willis Garth =

American politician and lawyer (1828–1912)

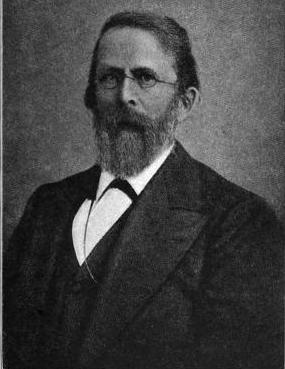

Member of the U.S. House of Representatives from Alabama's 8th district
- In office March 4, 1877 – March 3, 1879
- Preceded by: Constituency established
- Succeeded by: William M. Lowe

Personal details
- Born: October 28, 1828 Morgan County, Alabama, US
- Died: February 25, 1912 (aged 83) Huntsville, Alabama, US
- Resting place: Maple Hill Cemetery
- Party: Democratic
- Relations: Patrick Henry (cousin); Thomas Fearn (father-in-law); Alexander Spotswood (2nd-great-grandson); Martha Washington; Dolley Madison
- Parent: Jesse Winston Garth (father)
- Education: University of Virginia
- Occupation: Politician, lawyer

Military service
- Allegiance: Confederate States of America
- Branch/service: Confederate States Army
- Rank: Lieutenant colonel
- Battles/wars: Mexican–American War; American Civil War

William Willis Garth (October 28, 1828 – February 25, 1912) was an American politician and lawyer. A Democrat, he was a member of the United States House of Representatives from Alabama.

== Early life and education ==
Garth was born on October 28, 1828, in Morgan County, Alabama, the third of five children born to politician Jesse Winston Garth and Unity Spottswood Dandridge Garth. Through his father, he was a cousin of politician Founding Father Patrick Henry. Through his mother, he was the great-great-grandson of Governor Alexander Spotswood, and a relative to First Ladies Martha Washington and Dolley Madison.

Garth's mother died while he was a child. He spent his childhood in Virginia, where he received his education. He studied classics at Lagrange, Virginia and at Emory & Henry College, graduating in 1843. He later studied at the University of Virginia School of Law. He was subsequently admitted to the Alabama State Bar.

== Career ==
Garth volunteered in the Mexican–American War between his studied at Emory & Henry and the University of Virginia. After being admitted to the bar, he commenced practice in Decatur. In 1855, he moved to Huntsville, where he also practiced law. During the American Civil War, he was a lieutenant colonel in the Confederate States Army, serving under James Longstreet. He was discharged after contracting typhoid fever. After the war ended, he returned to practicing law in Huntsville. He oversaw the Memphis and Charleston Railroad during the war.

Garth was a Democrat. He served in the United States House of Representatives from March 4, 1877, to March 3, 1879, representing Alabama's 8th district. During his tenure, he voted in favor of the Posse Comitatus Act. The Huntsville Weekly Democrat described him as a "Jeffersonian Democrat". He lost the following election to Greenback candidate William M. Lowe, who managed to gain Republican support.

After serving in Congress, Garth returned to practicing law in Huntsville. For a time, he was president of the First National Bank.

== Personal life and death ==
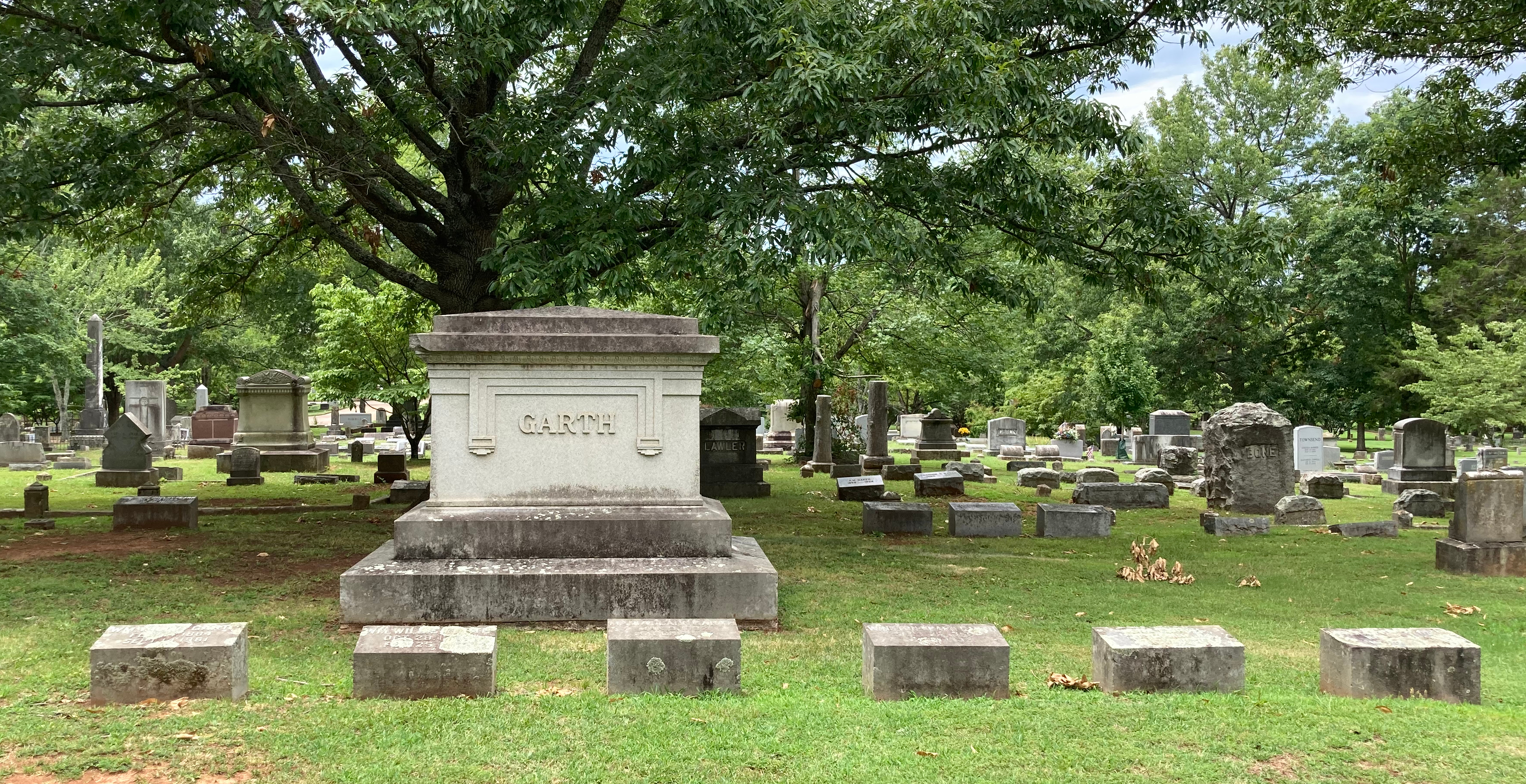
Garth's grave at Maple Hill Cemetery

On June 25, 1855, Garth married Maria Eliza Fearn, the daughter of politician Thomas Fearn; they had one son together. The 1860 United States census estimated his net worth at $52,000. In 1881, he purchased Drake Farm, which was sold to the Jones family in 1939. He was Anglican and a vestryman of his church, specifically its senior warden. He died on February 25, 1912, aged 83, in Huntsville, from a fall he sustained two weeks prior which dislocated his shoulder. He was buried at Maple Hill Cemetery.

U.S. House of Representatives
Preceded by District created	Member of the U.S. House of Representatives from Alabama's 8th congressional district March 4, 1877 - March 3, 1879	Succeeded by William M. Lowe
