= Bride's Hill =

Historic house in Alabama, United States

- U.S. National Register of Historic Places
- Alabama Register of Landmarks and Heritage
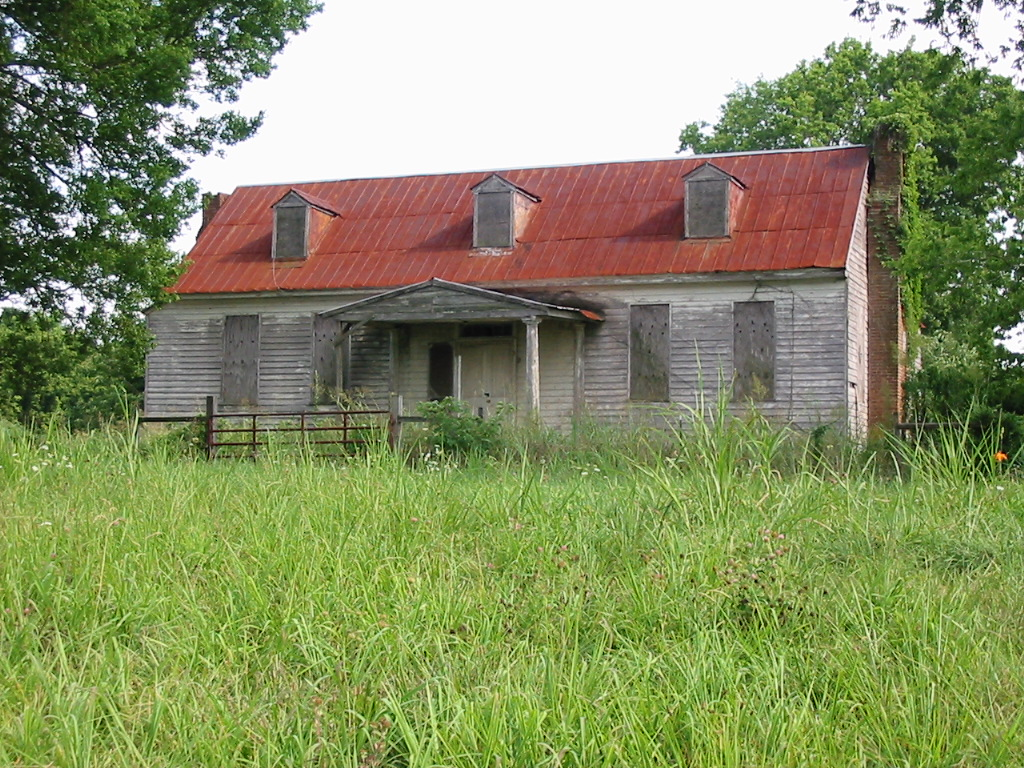
- Bride's Hill in 2005

- Location within Alabama Location within the United States
- Nearest city: Wheeler, Alabama
- Coordinates: 34°40′13″N 87°14′40″W
- Built: 1830
- MPS: Tidewater Cottages in the Tennessee Valley TR
- NRHP reference No.: 86001544; 100011918 (decrease)

Significant dates
- Added to NRHP: July 9, 1986
- Boundary decrease: June 3, 2025
- Designated ARLH: April 16, 1985

Bride's Hill, known also as Sunnybrook, is a historic plantation house near Wheeler, Alabama. It is significant as an example of a Tidewater-type cottage. It was added to the Alabama Register of Landmarks and Heritage on April 16, 1985, and to the National Register of Historic Places on July 9, 1986.

== History ==
A member of the Dandridge family, cousins of America's first First Lady (Martha Washington), is believed to have built Bride's Hill. Its deep cellar, lighted by oblong ground-level windows, houses a basement kitchen-dining room. On the main floor a broad central hall, with a graceful reverse-flight stairway rising to the low half-story above, separates two large rooms. Allegedly a separate brick kitchen structure once stood to the rear. When absorbed into the vast Joseph Wheeler estate in 1907, the house and surrounding farm became known as Sunnybrook. Located in rural Lawrence County, the house has been unoccupied since the 1980s and is in a state of disrepair.

== Architecture ==
Brought to the early Alabama plantation frontier by settlers from the Tidewater and Piedmont regions of Virginia, this vernacular house-type is usually a story-and-a-half in height, and characterized by prominent end chimneys flanking a steeply pitched roof often pierced by dormer windows.

Robert Gamble, in his book The Alabama Catalog, Historic American Buildings Survey: A Guide to the Early Architecture of the State gives this description of Bride's Hill architecture: —

this house was developed according to the double-square formula employed by colonial Virginia house builders, the front elevation of Bride's Hill is almost exactly twice as long as it is high, counting the slope of the roof. Another rare-perhaps unique-feature of this important early Alabama house is the cantilevered chimney pent, the narrow, shed-roofed projection that abuts the left chimney...another pent [is] to the rear of the right chimney.

== See also ==
- National Register of Historic Places listings in Lawrence County, Alabama
