= Slavery and States' Rights =

1894 speech by Joseph Wheeler

"Slavery and States' Rights" was a speech given by former Confederate States Army general Joseph Wheeler on July 31, 1894. The speech deals with the American Civil War and is considered to be a "Lost Cause" view of the war's causation. It is generally understood to argue that the United States (the Union) was to blame for the war, and downplays slavery as a cause.

== Overview ==
The Richmond, Virginia Dispatch stated, "The House of Representatives being in Committee of the Whole, on appropriations and expenditures, and having under consideration the bill to remove the charge of desertion standing against Patrick Kelleher, late private, Company C, Thirty-eighth Illinois Volunteers, Mr. Wheeler, of Alabama, as a member of the Committee on Military Affairs, made a speech."

In his speech, Wheeler argued that the northern states, before the Civil War, had failed to comply with the terms of the United States Constitution. In particular, he argued that slaves were property and that Northern states had infringed on the constitutional property rights of the enslavers. He also argued that not only had the northern states encouraged secession but that, in the past, they had sought secession. Thus, secession was a right of the Confederacy. As an aside, Wheeler insinuated that the northern states were themselves to blame for slavery.

=== Wheeler Alleged that the Union Violated the Constitution ===
Wheeler explained (paraphrased), "I refute allegations that the responsibility of the war rested altogether upon the southern people. Many States of the North enacted laws making it a criminal offence for any official to comply with his oath of office." Wheeler argued that the failure of northern states to comply with the fugitive slave laws violated the Constitution. (See: nullification)

Wheeler quoted Daniel Webster in his speech, "How absurd it is to suppose that when different parties enter into a compact for certain purposes either can disregard any one provision, and expect, nevertheless, the other to observe the rest!"

He also noted from the Constitution, "No person held to service or labor in one State under the laws thereof, escaping into another, shall, in consequence of any law or regulation therein, be discharged from such service or labor, but shall be delivered up on claim of the party to whom such service or labor may be due."

He quoted Webster further, "If the Northern States refuse, willfully and deliberately, to carry into effect that part of the Constitution which respects the restoration of fugitive slaves, and Congress provides no remedy, the South would no longer be bound to observe the compact."

Wheeler continues, "Then followed the election of Abraham Lincoln...The South was of necessity alarmed. They were seized with the fear that the extreme leaders of the Republican party would not stop at any excess and would deprive them of their property." (e.g., enslaved people)

Wheeler quoted Webster, "Look at the proceedings of the anti-slavery conventions in Ohio, Massachusetts, and at Syracuse, in the State of New York. They pledge their lives, their fortunes, and their sacred honor to violate the Constitution; they pledge their sacred honor to commit treason!"

=== Wheeler Alleged that the Southern Colonies had Opposed Slavery ===
Wheeler also argued that northerners were to blame for slavery. He said, "When the people of the South settled on the shores of Maryland, Virginia, the Carolinas, and Georgia, they had no intention of encouraging or even tolerating the institution of slavery. The thrifty New England seamen, solely with the view of profit, urged slavery upon all the Colonies".

Wheeler continues, "Oglethorpe and his colonists were possibly the most determined in resisting the importation, sale and use of African slaves; and for twenty years they were successful in the enforcement of the law which prohibited the landing of slaves in Georgia."

Wheeler added, "The evil of this traffic soon became apparent to the people of the South, and when the Constitution was framed in 1787, the South demanded that the fundamental law of our land should inhibit this traffic of importing human beings from Africa. The South was resisted by the New England slave-traders."

One might construe that Wheeler was arguing that northern capitalists first "tricked" southerners into enslaving people. Then, once enslavers had heavily invested in this property, the northern states waged what Wheeler called "a war upon the institution of slavery."

=== Wheeler Alleges That Secession is a Right ===
Wheeler argued that the right of the Confederacy to secede from the United States was a historically proven right.

Wheeler quoted Horace Greeley, "If the Declaration of Independence justifies the secession from the British Empire of three million colonists in 1776, we do not see why it would not justify the secession of five millions of southerns from the Federal Union in 1861."

He also mentioned the Shay Rebellion in Massachusetts, the Whiskey Rebellion in Pennsylvania, the Dorr Rebellion in Rhode Island, and the Hartford Convention in Connecticut.

Wheeler added, "For more than half a century the South had been taught by their northern brethren that when the people of a State found that it was not to their advantage to remain in the Union it was not only their privilege but their duty to peacefully withdraw from it."

Wheeler then quoted from John Quincy Adams, "If the day should ever come when the affections of the people of these States shall be alienated from each other...far better will it be for the people of the disunited States to part in friendship from each other than to be held together by constraint."

Wheeler notes, "Mr. Adams and the people of New England generally regarded these views as the correct interpretation of the original compact which bound the people together."

Wheeler adds (reading from the Congressional Globe, volume XI, page 977), "Three years later, on January 24, 1842, Mr. Adams presented the petition of sundry citizens of Haverhill, in the State of Massachusetts, praying that Congress will immediately adopt measures favorably to dissolve the union of these States."

Wheeler continues, "On page 980, Adams spoke, 'I hold that it is no perjury, that it is no high-treason, but the exercise of a sacred right to offer such a petition.'"

Wheeler goes on, "Mr. Gilmer, page 983, introduced the following resolution: Resolved, That in presenting to the consideration of this House a petition for the dissolution of the Union, the member from Massachusetts (Mr. Adams) has justly incurred the censure of this House."

Wheeler went on to argue that the failure of the House to pass Gilmer's resolution was a clear demonstration that the House agreed with Adams's statements.

Wheeler also read from the Acts and resolutions passed by the Legislature of Massachusetts in the year 1844", page 319, "2. Resolved, That the project of the annexation of Texas, unless arrested on the threshold, may drive these States into a dissolution of the Union."

=== Wheeler Alleges That the Northern Press Advocated Secession ===
The final part of Wheeler's speech treated the Northern press's sentiments. He argued that the North had indicated the South was free to secede.

From the New York Tribune of November 9, 1860, "If the cotton States shall become satisfied that they can do better out of the Union than in it, we insist on letting them go in peace. We hope never to live in a republic whereof one section is pinned to the residue by bayonets."

From the Tribune, of November 16, "If the fifteen slave States, or even the eight cotton States alone, shall quietly, decisively say to the rest: 'We prefer to be henceforth separated from you,' we shall insist that they be permitted to go in peace. Whenever the people of the cotton States shall have definitely and decisively made up their minds to separate from the rest of us, we shall urge that the proper steps be taken to give full effect to their decision."

And from the Tribune of November 19, "Whenever the slave States or the cotton States only shall unitedly and coolly say to the rest, "We want to get out of the Union", we shall urge that their request be acceded to."

From the New York Herald of November 26, "Coercion, in any event, is out of the question. A union held together by the bayonet would be nothing better than a military despotism."

From the Herald of November 24, "We have no desire to prevent secession by coercion."

From the New York Daily Tribune of November 30, "We insist that they cannot be prevented, and that the attempt must not be made. If you choose to leave the Union, leave it. If you are better by yourselves, go."

From the New York Times of December 3, Wheeler quoted Horace Greeley: "If seven or eight contiguous States shall present themselves authentically at Washington, saying: 'We hate the Federal Union; we have withdrawn from it; we will give you the choice between acquiescing in our secession and arranging amicably all incidental questions on the one hand, and attempting to subdue us on the other', we could not stand up for coercion, for subjugation, for we do not think it would be just."

Greeley was an abolitionist, and Wheeler continued, "We hold the right of self-government even when invoked in behalf of those who deny it to others. Any attempt to compel them by force would be contrary to the fundamental ideas on which human liberty is based. If the slave States, the cotton States, or the gulf States choose to form an independent nation, they have a clear, moral right to do so."

Wheeler then read from the Commercial (an Ohio newspaper), "We are not in favor of retaking the property of the United States now in possession of the seceders."

Wheeler quoted from General Winfield Scott, "Wayward sisters, part in peace."

Wheeler stated, "In obedience to all this advice, the Southern States did secede, and almost immediately the vast Federal armies were raised."

Wheeler ended his speech by describing the magnitude of casualties killed in the war.

== See also ==
- Constitution of the Confederate States
- Cornerstone Speech
- Neo-Confederate
