= William Richardson (Alabama politician) =

Confederate Army soldier and politician

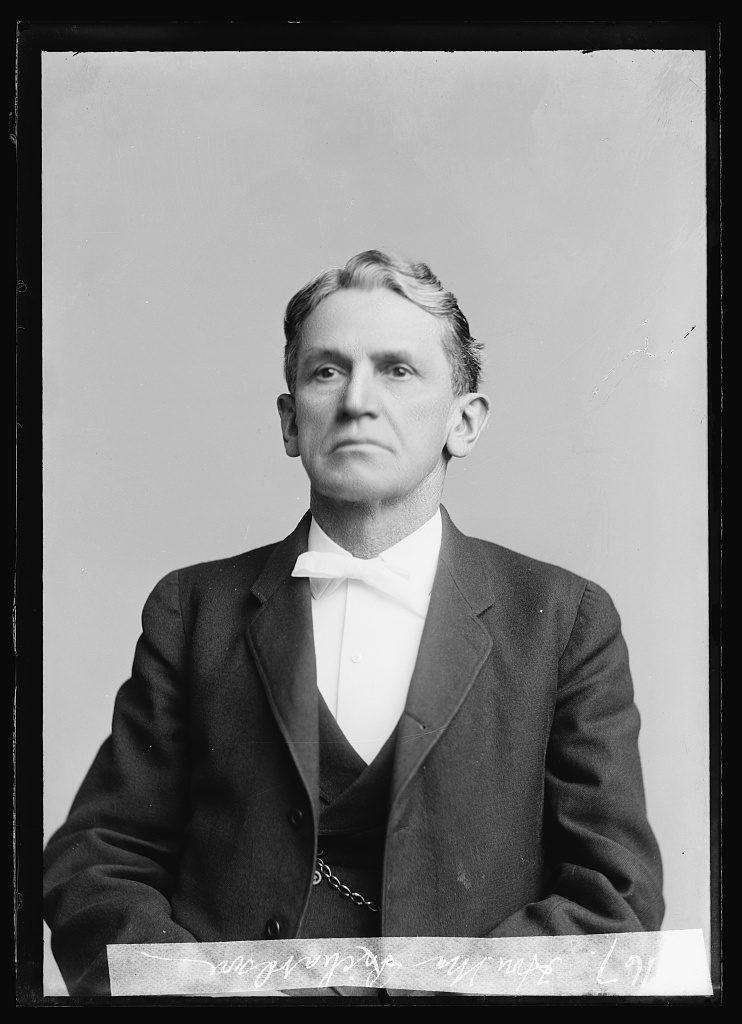

Member of the U.S. House of Representatives from Alabama's 8th district
- In office August 6, 1900 – March 31, 1914
- Preceded by: Joseph Wheeler
- Succeeded by: Christopher C. Harris

Member of the Alabama House of Representatives
- In office 1865–1867

Personal details
- Born: May 8, 1839 Athens, Alabama, US
- Died: March 31, 1914 (aged 74) Atlantic City, New Jersey, US
- Resting place: Maple Hill Cemetery, Huntsville, Alabama, US
- Party: Democratic
- Spouse: Elizabeth Rucker
- Profession: Attorney

Military service
- Allegiance: Confederate States of America
- Branch/service: Confederate States Army
- Rank: Captain
- Unit: 50th Alabama Infantry

William Richardson (May 8, 1839 – March 31, 1914) was an American politician and lawyer.

Born in Athens, Alabama, to William Richardson and Anne Davis, Richardson served in the Civil War, fighting for the Confederacy.

== Civil War ==
Richardson enlisted in Co. K, 50th Regiment Alabama Infantry and was wounded in the battle of Shiloh and was taken prisoner. He escaped from prison, was caught, and about to be shot as a spy at Murfreesboro when "on the morning air there came to our ears with heartfelt welcome the famous rebel yell," and General Forrest with his "critter company" rescued him. This account is given in Andrew Nelson Lytle's Bedford Forrest and His Horse Critters. William then joined Company E of the 50th Alabama Infantry Regiment, and was again wounded at Chickamauga. He was paroled in April 1865 in Marietta, Georgia.

== Political office ==
After the war, Richardson returned to Limestone County and served in the Alabama House of Representatives between 1865 and 1867 from that district. He studied law and was admitted to the bar at Huntsville in 1867. Between 1875 and 1886, he served as judge of the probate and county courts of Madison County. Richardson played a major role in the election of George Smith Houston as governor the next year. He was a delegate to the Democratic National Convention in 1904.

He was elected as a Democrat to the Fifty-sixth congress to fill the vacancy caused by the resignation of Joseph Wheeler. He was reelected to the Fifty-seventh and to the six succeeding Congresses. He served until his death.

== Personal life ==
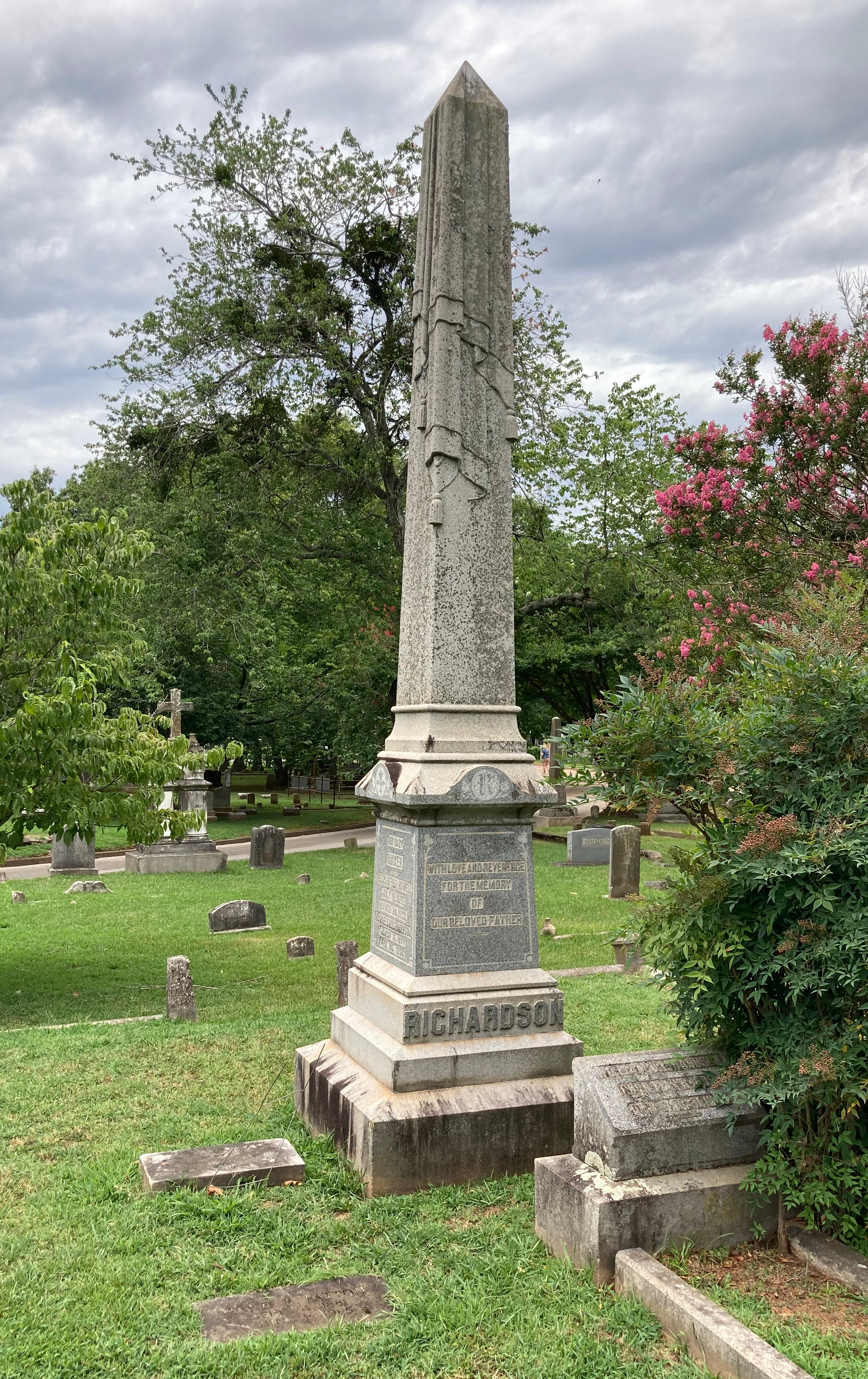
Richardson's grave at Maple Hill Cemetery

Richardson married his cousin, Elizabeth Rucker, of Lynchburg, Virginia in 1872, and they were the parents of five children.

Richardson died on March 31, 1914, in Atlantic City, New Jersey, where he had gone for his health, and is buried in Maple Hill Cemetery in Huntsville.

== See also ==
- List of members of the United States Congress who died in office (1900–1949)

== Notes ==
U.S. House of Representatives
Preceded by Joseph Wheeler	Member of the U.S. House of Representatives from Alabama's 8th congressional district August 6, 1900 – March 31, 1914	Succeeded by Christopher C. Harris
