= Christopher Columbus Harris =

American politician (1842–1935)

C.C. Harris
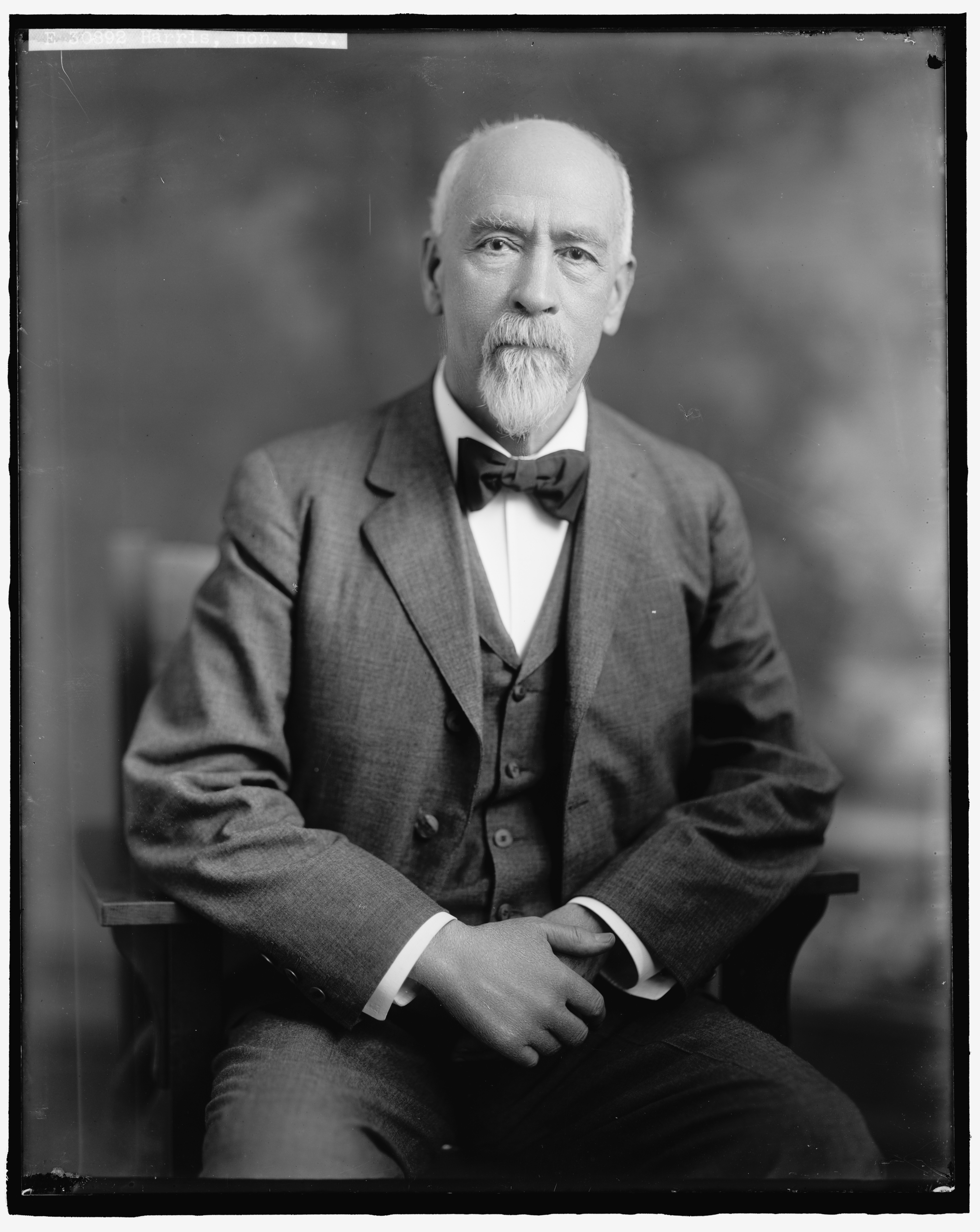

Member of the U.S. House of Representatives from Alabama
- In office May 11, 1914 – March 3, 1915
- Preceded by: William N. Richardson
- Succeeded by: Edward B. Almon
- Constituency: 8th District

Personal details
- Born: Christopher Columbus Harris; January 28, 1842 Lawrence County, Alabama
- Died: December 28, 1935 (aged 93) Decatur, Alabama
- Resting place: Decatur City Cemetery
- Party: Democratic
- Profession: Lawyer, banker

Christopher Columbus Harris (January 28, 1842 – December 28, 1935) was an American lawyer, banker, and Confederate Civil War veteran who represented Alabama's 8th congressional district in the United States House of Representatives from 1914 to 1915.

== Early life ==
Harris was born in Lawrence County, Alabama near the community of Mount Hope. His education consisted of both the public schools and private tutoring.

=== Civil War ===
When the American Civil War began, Harris enlisted in the Confederate States of America army. He was assigned to the Sixteenth Alabama Infantry, Company F. He progressed through the ranks, attaining the rank of lieutenant. At a point, Harris was captured and taken as a prisoner of war by the Union. He was held at Camp Chase, Ohio, until the war ended.

== Postwar activities ==
Upon returning to Alabama, Harris served as Clerk of the Circuit Court of Lawrence County from 1865 to 1867. He studied law and began to practice in Moulton, Alabama. In 1872, Harris moved to the larger city of Decatur, Alabama, where he continued his practice of law. In 1887 he was instrumental in establishing the First National Bank of Decatur and served as its president until 1913.

== Politics ==
In that year he established the Bank of Commerce and became its president. He also became the chairman of the Democratic executive committee for the 8th district and was elected to fill the unexpired term of William Richardson, who had died in office. He served from May 1914 until March 1915. He did not seek reelection.

== Later life ==
After his Washington work, Harris returned to Alabama and served as president of City National Bank in Decatur. He was later named to the Chairmanship of the bank.

=== Death and burial ===
He died December 28, 1935 at the age of 93. He is buried in the Decatur City Cemetery, Decatur, Alabama.

U.S. House of Representatives
Preceded by William N. Richardson	Member of the U.S. House of Representatives from Alabama's 8th congressional district May 11, 1914 – March 3, 1915	Succeeded by Edward B. Almon
