= Archibald H. Carmichael =

American politician

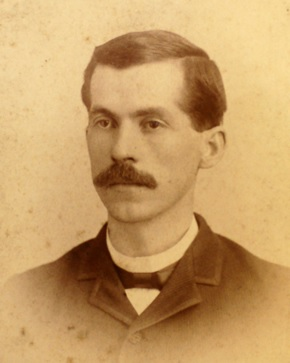

Member of the U.S. House of Representatives from Alabama's 8th district
- In office November 14, 1933 – January 3, 1937
- Preceded by: Edward B. Almon
- Succeeded by: John Sparkman

Member of the Alabama Senate from the 31st district
- In office January 14, 1919 – January 10, 1923
- Preceded by: W. H. Key
- Succeeded by: John P. Middleton

Speaker of the Alabama House of Representatives
- In office January 12, 1915 – January 14, 1919
- Preceded by: Edward B. Almon
- Succeeded by: Henry P. Merritt
- In office February 26, 1907 – January 10, 1911; Pro tempore: February 26, 1907 – March 4, 1907
- Preceded by: William L. Martin
- Succeeded by: Edward B. Almon

Member of the Alabama House of Representatives from Colbert County
- In office January 12, 1915 – January 14, 1919
- Preceded by: Edward B. Almon
- Succeeded by: W. H. Shaw
- In office January 8, 1907 – January 10, 1911
- Succeeded by: Edward B. Almon

Personal details
- Born: Archibald Hill Carmichael; June 17, 1864 Sylvan Grove, Alabama, U.S.
- Died: July 15, 1947 (aged 83) Tuscumbia, Alabama, U.S.
- Party: Democratic
- Spouse: Annie Sugg
- Education: University of Alabama

Archibald Hill Carmichael (June 17, 1864 – July 15, 1947) was an American Democratic politician who represented Alabama's 8th congressional district in the United States House of Representatives from November 1933 to January 1937.

== Early life ==
Archibald Hill Carmichael was born in Dale County, Alabama, near the community of Sylvan Grove. His father, Jesse Malcolm Carmichael, who fought in the Civil War and lost a hand at the Battle of Antietam, served as Alabama Secretary of State. The younger Carmichael received his education in public schools and studied at the University of Alabama School of Law, graduating in 1886. He was admitted to the bar that same year and moved to north Alabama to practice law in Tuscumbia. Carmichael married Annie Sugg in 1890.

== Political life ==
Carmichael served four years (1890–1894) as solicitor for the 8th judicial district of Alabama. In 1901 he was a delegate to the Alabama state constitutional convention. It was this convention which drafted the Alabama constitution presently in use in Alabama today and which is one of the longest such documents in the world. Carmichael served in the Alabama House of Representatives from 1907 until 1911 and then again from 1915 until 1919. During those tenure's he served as the Speaker of the House in 1907 and 1911. Active in partisan politics Carmichael was a delegate to the Democratic National Convention in 1916, 1928 and 1932.

=== School boards ===
Carmichael was active in both state and local education issues. In fact, he held three elected positions at the same time. He was elected to the Alabama State Senate from 1919 to 1923; the Alabama State Board of Education from 1919 to 1947 and the local Tuscumbia Board of Education from 1920 to 1947. During that same period, he was appointed as a trustee of the University of Alabama from 1924 to 1947.

=== U.S. Congress ===
Carmichael's first election to the U.S. House of Representatives came on November 7, 1933, when he was elected to fill the unexpired term of Edward B. Almon who had died while in office. Carmichael was elected to a full term in the 74th Congress serving from 1935 to 1937. During this session, the Social Security Act became law. He did not seek re-election.

=== Later career and death ===
After leaving Congress, he returned to Alabama, where he continued to practice law until his death.

Archibald Hill Carmichael died in Tuscumbia on July 15, 1947, at the age of 83.

== Notes ==
U.S. House of Representatives
Preceded by Edward B. Almon	Member of the U.S. House of Representatives from Alabama's 8th congressional district 1933–1937	Succeeded by John J. Sparkman
