= Burritt on the Mountain =

Historic house in Alabama, United States

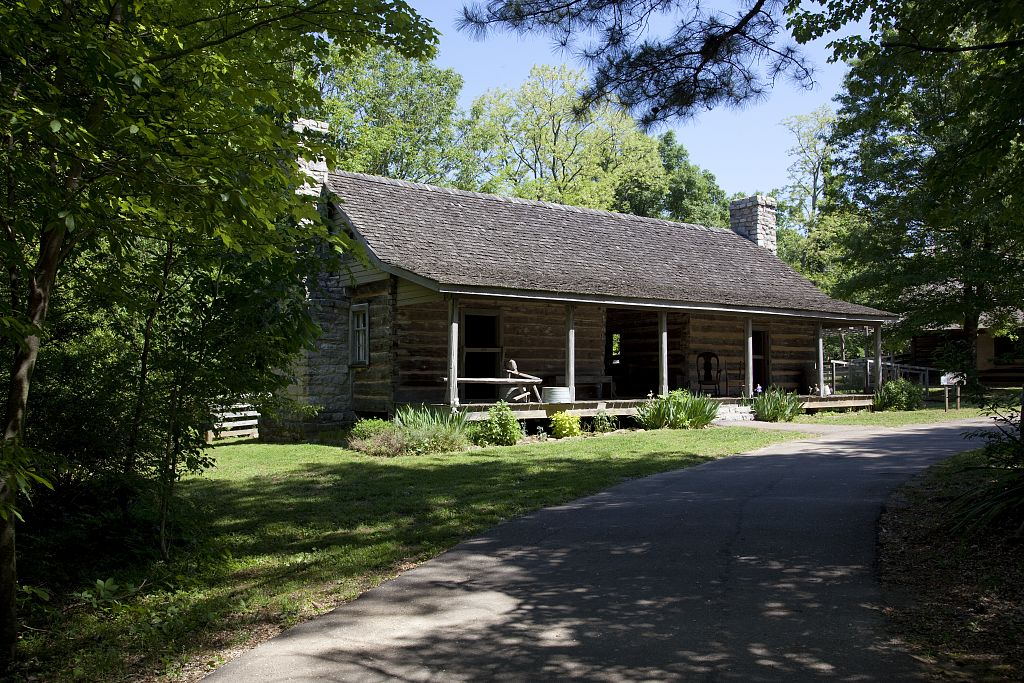
- The Smith-Williams House, one of several 19th century structures at the museum
- Established: 1955
- Location: Huntsville, Alabama
- Coordinates: 34°42′57″N 86°32′22″W
- Type: Open-air museum
- Website: www.burrittonthemountain.com

Burritt on the Mountain is an open-air museum in Huntsville, Alabama. The museum grounds on Round Top Mountain, a plateau connected to Monte Sano Mountain, were the estate of local physician William Burritt, who willed his house and land to the city for use as a museum upon his death in 1955. A number of 19th-century rural structures have been added to Burritt's mansion, both in the interest of historical preservation and life re-enactment.

== History ==
William Henry Burritt was born in Huntsville in 1869. A great-great-grandson of Rev. Blackleach Burritt, he followed in his father, grandfather's and great-grandfather's footsteps, becoming a physician and set up practice in 1891. In 1900 he moved to St. Louis, Missouri, with his second wife. There he became involved in managing farming, logging, and mining operations, and in rubber production, where he received 22 patents for his tire inventions. Burritt returned to Huntsville after his wife's death in 1934 and designed an eccentric mansion surrounded by 167 acres (68 ha) where he would farm and raise goats in his retirement. In addition to eclectic decorative design, the house featured straw insulation, inspired by a visit on a hot day to a Missouri farm. On June 6, 1936, the day Burritt moved into the mansion, it burned to the ground due to an electrical fire, exacerbated by the straw insulation and its protective metal panels. The mansion was rebuilt, and Burritt lived there until his death in 1955.

Having no heirs, Burritt donated his house and property to the city for the purpose of establishing a museum. The museum began purchasing rural log houses and barns that were in danger of demolition and relocating them to the grounds. Three structures were moved to the museum between 1964 and 1974. The park is divided into two areas: 1850 and 1900, with buildings, furniture, and tools from each time period. Today, twelve 19th century structures have been fully restored and are part of the museum.

== Exhibits ==
Major 19th-century buildings in the historic park include the Balch House, originally built in 1887 near Harvest; the Chandler House, a dogtrot house from Lester in Limestone County; an 1884 church that originally stood in downtown Madison; the Meals House, an 1845 cabin from near Lester; the Smith-Williams House, an 1868 marriage of two 1840s structures originally from McKay Hollow at the foot of Monte Sano; and an 1890s barn from near Minor Hill, Tennessee. The museum also features two buildings that are listed on the National Register of Historic Places: the Burritt Mansion, and the Joel Eddins House. Non-historic structures include a welcome center, administrative building, a replica of a four-room Rosenwald school, and an events center designed to look like the demolished Hotel Monte Sano.

=== William Burritt Mansion ===
- William Burritt Mansion
- U.S. National Register of Historic Places
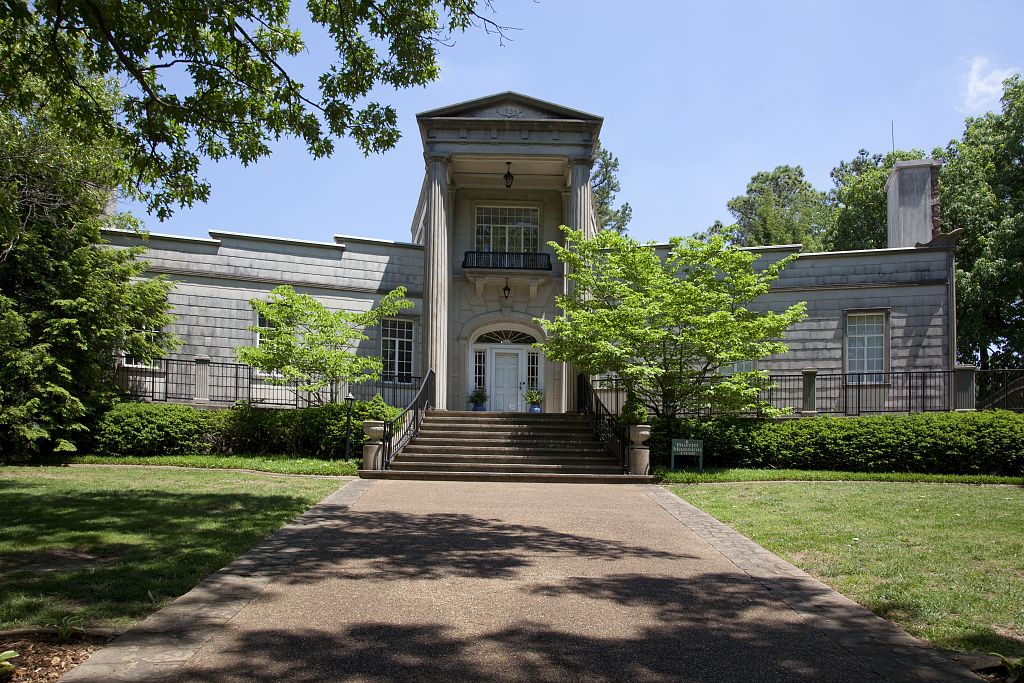
- The Mansion in May 2010

- Location within Huntsville, Alabama Location within Alabama Location within the United States
- Location: 3101 Burritt Dr., SE., Huntsville, Alabama
- Area: less than one acre
- Built: 1938
- Architect: William Burritt, Edgar Love
- Architectural style: Classical Revival
- NRHP reference No.: 92000627
- Added to NRHP: May 29, 1992

The Burritt Mansion has a two-story, octagonal main section with 4 one-story wings forming an X shape. Off the rear of the house on the east end is a conservatory. The exterior walls are covered in grey asbestos shingles, mimicking a stone construction. All of the roofs, except the pedimented portico, are flat and hidden by a stepped parapet topped with concrete caps. The two-story main entry portico is supported by two fluted Doric columns. The front door is in a Federal Style with sidelights and topped with a fanlight. The second story of the portico features a small balcony. On the face of the pediment, a panel reads "1935", the construction date of the original house. A terrace runs the length of the front of the house. Small porches with entries similar to the main entry are between the wings on the south and north sides of the house. Windows on the first floor are casements with eight panes on each side and eight panes in a transom-like panel above. The house has chimneys at the ends of the north, south, and west wings, and two interior chimneys in the north wing and in the center of the main block.

The main entry opens into a hall containing a spiral staircase. The west wing (off the entry hall to the left) is a large parlor, while the south wing (to the right) is the master suite, consisting of a study and bedroom. The northeastern part of the main block is a dining room, off of which the north wing contains the kitchen and a bedroom, and the east wing contains a sitting room and a bedroom. Upstairs, an observatory room sits on the front of the house, with a view of the city below, and behind it are a bedroom and small kitchen. Many of the rooms have been converted into gallery space which host rotating exhibits, usually historical and cultural topics relating to North Alabama. The house was listed on the National Register in 1992.

=== Joel Eddins House ===
The Eddins House was built in 1810 near Ardmore in Limestone County. The 1 1/2-story hall and parlor log home was moved to Burritt in 2007. The house was listed on the National Register in 1996.
