= Edward B. Almon =

American politician (1860–1933)

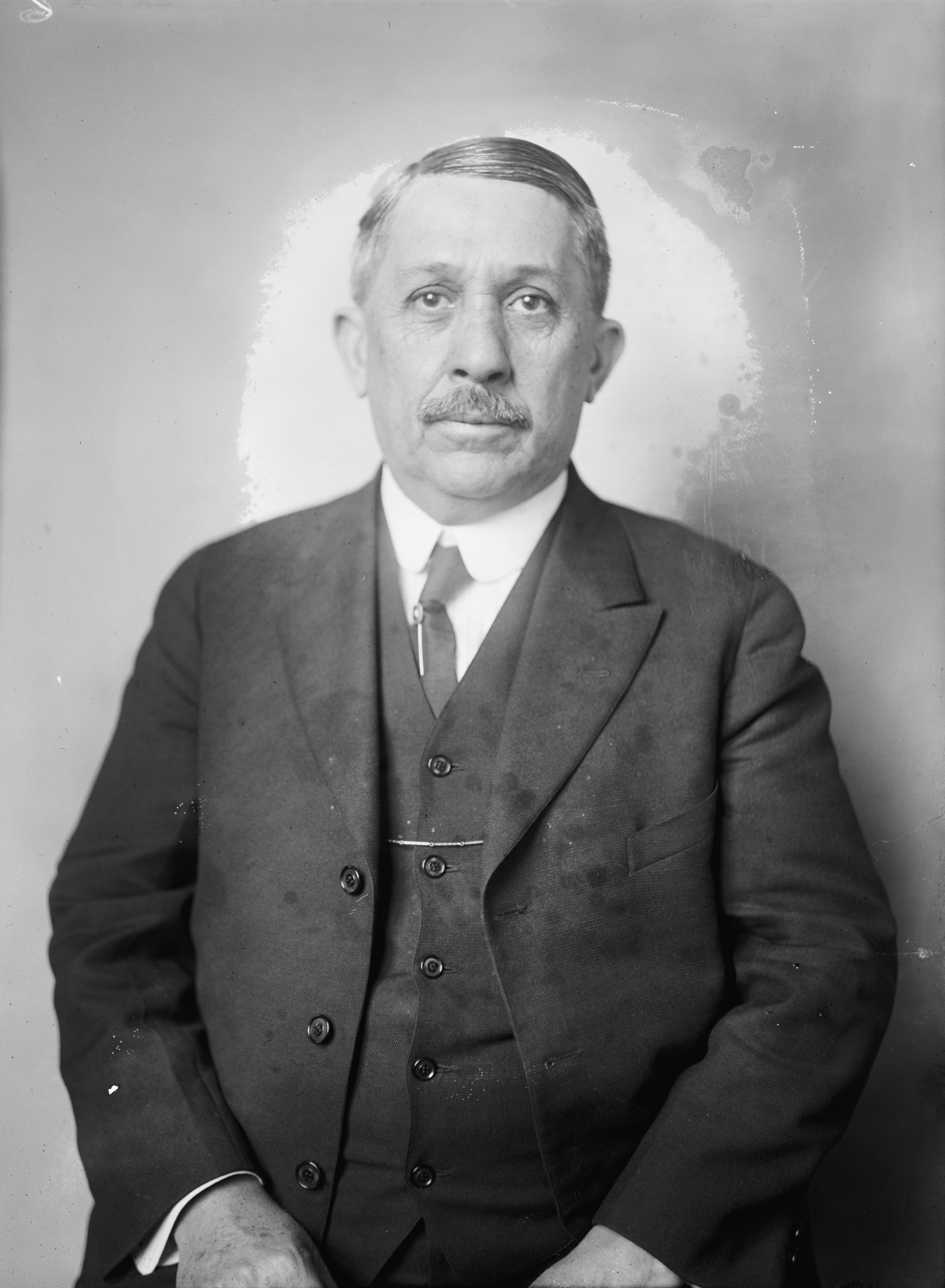

Member of the U.S. House of Representatives from Alabama's 8th district
- In office March 4, 1915 – June 22, 1933
- Preceded by: Christopher C. Harris
- Succeeded by: Archibald H. Carmichael

Speaker of the Alabama House of Representatives
- In office January 10, 1911 – January 12, 1915
- Preceded by: Archibald H. Carmichael
- Succeeded by: Archibald H. Carmichael

Member of the Alabama House of Representatives from Colbert County
- In office January 10, 1911 – January 12, 1915
- Preceded by: Archibald H. Carmichael
- Succeeded by: Archibald H. Carmichael

Member of the Alabama Senate from the 31st district
- In office November 15, 1892 – November 13, 1896
- Preceded by: L. D. Godfrey
- Succeeded by: W. H. Matthews

Personal details
- Born: Edward Berton Almon; April 18, 1860 Lawrence, Alabama, U.S.
- Died: June 22, 1933 (aged 73) Washington, D.C., U.S.
- Party: Democratic
- Spouse: Luie Clopper
- Education: University of Alabama

Edward Berton Almon (April 18, 1860 – June 22, 1933) was an American, and a Democratic member of the United States House of Representatives who represented northwest Alabama's 8th congressional district.

== Early life ==
Almon was born near Moulton, Alabama in Lawrence County, April 18, 1860, son of George W. and Nancy (Eubank) Almon. He graduated from the State Normal School in Florence, Alabama (the predecessor of the University of North Alabama) and then the University of Alabama School of Law in 1883. He passed the bar exam and entered the legal profession in 1885 in Tuscumbia, Alabama. He married Luie Clopper on December 13, 1887, and they had two daughters, Lottie and Louise.

== Career ==
Almon entered the political arena in 1892 when he was elected to the Alabama Senate, and served from 1892 to 1894. He was a Presidential Elector for Alabama in 1896. Elected circuit court judge in 1898, he served until 1906. From 1910 to 1915 Almon served in the Alabama House of Representatives including one year (1911) as Speaker. His successor, Archibald Hill Carmichael also served as Speaker of the Alabama House both immediately before and after Almon.

In 1914, Almon ran as a Democratic Party candidate for the United States House of Representatives and won. He took office on March 3, 1915, and served nine terms until his death on June 22, 1933. During his term in the U.S. House he served as Chairman of the House Committee on Roads from 1931 until 1933. On April 5, 1917, Almon was one of the 50 representatives who voted against declaring war on Germany, despite his district being one of the areas most heavily in favor of the war. During the 65th Congress, both bodies passed the Sedition Act which criminalized certain kinds of political dissent in the United States. The 67th Congress repealed the act.

== Death ==
Almon died in Washington, D.C., on June 22, 1933, aged 73. He is interred at Oakwood Cemetery, Tuscumbia, Alabama. He was succeeded by Archibald Hill Carmichael.

== See also ==
- 65th United States Congress
- 67th United States Congress
- List of members of the United States Congress who died in office (1900–1949)

U.S. House of Representatives
| Preceded by Christopher Columbus Harris | Member of the U.S. House of Representatives from Alabama's 8th congressional district 1915–1933 | Succeeded by Archibald Hill Carmichael |
