= Alabama's 8th congressional district =

Former congressional district

Coordinates: 34°52′53.13″N 87°13′3.76″W

- Obsolete district
- Population (1960): 383,625
- Created: 1870
- Eliminated: 1970
- Years active: 1873-1973

Alabama's 8th congressional district, now obsolete, was established in 1877.

Alabama currently has seven congressional districts represented in the United States House of Representatives.

According to the U.S. Census Bureau, Alabama was apportioned eight congressional seats as a result of the 1880 census. In 1893-1913 there were nine seats, and in 1913-1933 there were ten seats, the maximum ever for Alabama. In 1970, Alabama lost its eighth seat when population growth slowed to qualify for only seven seats.

The 8th seat was elected at-large from the entire state until the 45th Congress, when an 8th district was established as a separate district in the northwestern part of the state. The district occupied an area now held by Alabama's 5th congressional district, with the exception of a portion of Morgan County, which is part of the 4th district. Franklin County, which was part of the 8th district until after the 1890 census, is also part of the modern 4th district.

The district was eliminated in reapportionment at the end of the 92nd United States Congress in 1973. Robert E. Jones Jr. was the district's last representative.

== History ==
The district was eliminated in the 1970 redistricting cycle after the 1970 United States census.

== List of members representing the district ==
Member	Party	Years	Cong ress	Electoral history	Population / Counties
District created March 3, 1877
William W. Garth (Huntsville)	Democratic	March 4, 1877 – March 3, 1879	45th	Elected in 1876. Lost re-election.	1877–1883: Population 130,173; Colbert, Franklin, Jackson, Lauderdale, Lawrence, Limestone, Madison, Morgan
William M. Lowe (Huntsville)	Greenback	March 4, 1879 – March 3, 1881	46th	Elected in 1878. Lost re-election.	1877–1883: Population 130,173; Colbert, Franklin, Jackson, Lauderdale, Lawrence, Limestone, Madison, Morgan
Joseph Wheeler (Wheeler)	Democratic	March 4, 1881 – June 3, 1882	47th	Elected in 1880. Lost election contest.	1877–1883: Population 130,173; Colbert, Franklin, Jackson, Lauderdale, Lawrence, Limestone, Madison, Morgan
William M. Lowe (Huntsville)	Greenback	June 3, 1882 – October 12, 1882	47th	Won election contest. Died.	1877–1883: Population 130,173; Colbert, Franklin, Jackson, Lauderdale, Lawrence, Limestone, Madison, Morgan
Vacant		October 12, 1882 – January 15, 1883	47th		1877–1883: Population 130,173; Colbert, Franklin, Jackson, Lauderdale, Lawrence, Limestone, Madison, Morgan
Joseph Wheeler (Wheeler)	Democratic	January 15, 1883 – March 3, 1883	47th	Elected January 3, 1883 to finish Lowe's term and seated January 15, 1883. Had not been elected to the next term.	1877–1883: Population 130,173; Colbert, Franklin, Jackson, Lauderdale, Lawrence, Limestone, Madison, Morgan
Luke Pryor (Athens)	Democratic	March 4, 1883 – March 3, 1885	48th	Elected in 1882. Retired.	1883–1893: Population 168,502; Colbert, Franklin, Jackson, Lauderdale, Lawrence, Limestone, Madison, Morgan
Joseph Wheeler (Wheeler)	Democratic	March 4, 1885 – April 20, 1900	49th 50th 51st 52nd 53rd 54th 55th 56th 57th	Elected in 1884. Re-elected in 1886. Re-elected in 1888. Re-elected in 1890. Re-elected in 1892. Re-elected in 1894. Re-elected in 1896. Re-elected in 1898. Re-elected in 1900. Resigned.	1883–1893: Population 168,502; Colbert, Franklin, Jackson, Lauderdale, Lawrence, Limestone, Madison, Morgan
Joseph Wheeler (Wheeler)	Democratic	March 4, 1885 – April 20, 1900	49th 50th 51st 52nd 53rd 54th 55th 56th 57th	Elected in 1884. Re-elected in 1886. Re-elected in 1888. Re-elected in 1890. Re-elected in 1892. Re-elected in 1894. Re-elected in 1896. Re-elected in 1898. Re-elected in 1900. Resigned.	1893–1903: Population 176,088; Colbert, Jackson, Lauderdale, Lawrence, Limestone, Madison, Morgan
Vacant		April 20, 1900 – August 6, 1900	57th		1893–1903: Population 176,088; Colbert, Jackson, Lauderdale, Lawrence, Limestone, Madison, Morgan
William N. Richardson (Huntsville)	Democratic	August 6, 1900 – March 31, 1914	57th 58th 59th 60th 61st 62nd 63rd	Elected to finish Wheeler's term. Re-elected in 1902. Re-elected in 1904. Re-elected in 1906. Re-elected in 1908. Re-elected in 1910. Re-elected in 1912. Died.	1893–1903: Population 176,088; Colbert, Jackson, Lauderdale, Lawrence, Limestone, Madison, Morgan
William N. Richardson (Huntsville)	Democratic	August 6, 1900 – March 31, 1914	57th 58th 59th 60th 61st 62nd 63rd	Elected to finish Wheeler's term. Re-elected in 1902. Re-elected in 1904. Re-elected in 1906. Re-elected in 1908. Re-elected in 1910. Re-elected in 1912. Died.	1903–1913: Population 194,491; Colbert, Jackson, Lauderdale, Lawrence, Limestone, Madison, Morgan
William N. Richardson (Huntsville)	Democratic	August 6, 1900 – March 31, 1914	57th 58th 59th 60th 61st 62nd 63rd	Elected to finish Wheeler's term. Re-elected in 1902. Re-elected in 1904. Re-elected in 1906. Re-elected in 1908. Re-elected in 1910. Re-elected in 1912. Died.	1913–1923: Population 218,342; Colbert, Jackson, Lauderdale, Lawrence, Limestone, Madison, Morgan
Vacant		March 31, 1914 – May 11, 1914	63rd		1913–1923: Population 218,342; Colbert, Jackson, Lauderdale, Lawrence, Limestone, Madison, Morgan
Christopher C. Harris (Decatur)	Democratic	May 11, 1914 – March 3, 1915	63rd	Elected to finish Richardson's term. Retired.	1913–1923: Population 218,342; Colbert, Jackson, Lauderdale, Lawrence, Limestone, Madison, Morgan
Edward B. Almon (Tuscumbia)	Democratic	March 4, 1915 – June 22, 1933	64th 65th 66th 67th 68th 69th 70th 71st 72nd 73rd	Elected in 1914. Re-elected in 1916. Re-elected in 1918. Re-elected in 1920. Re-elected in 1922. Re-elected in 1924. Re-elected in 1926. Re-elected in 1928. Re-elected in 1930. Re-elected in 1932. Died.	1913–1923: Population 218,342; Colbert, Jackson, Lauderdale, Lawrence, Limestone, Madison, Morgan
Edward B. Almon (Tuscumbia)	Democratic	March 4, 1915 – June 22, 1933	64th 65th 66th 67th 68th 69th 70th 71st 72nd 73rd	Elected in 1914. Re-elected in 1916. Re-elected in 1918. Re-elected in 1920. Re-elected in 1922. Re-elected in 1924. Re-elected in 1926. Re-elected in 1928. Re-elected in 1930. Re-elected in 1932. Died.	1923–1933: Population 254,529; Colbert, Jackson, Lauderdale, Lawrence, Limestone, Madison, Morgan
Edward B. Almon (Tuscumbia)	Democratic	March 4, 1915 – June 22, 1933	64th 65th 66th 67th 68th 69th 70th 71st 72nd 73rd	Elected in 1914. Re-elected in 1916. Re-elected in 1918. Re-elected in 1920. Re-elected in 1922. Re-elected in 1924. Re-elected in 1926. Re-elected in 1928. Re-elected in 1930. Re-elected in 1932. Died.	1923–1943: Population 282,241; Colbert, Jackson, Lauderdale, Lawrence, Limestone, Madison, Morgan
Vacant		June 22, 1933 – November 14, 1933	73rd		1923–1943: Population 282,241; Colbert, Jackson, Lauderdale, Lawrence, Limestone, Madison, Morgan
Archibald H. Carmichael (Tuscumbia)	Democratic	November 14, 1933 – January 3, 1937	73rd 74th	Elected to finish Almon's term. Re-elected in 1934. Retired.	1923–1943: Population 282,241; Colbert, Jackson, Lauderdale, Lawrence, Limestone, Madison, Morgan
John Sparkman (Huntsville)	Democratic	January 3, 1937 – November 5, 1946	75th 76th 77th 78th 79th	Elected in 1936. Re-elected in 1938. Re-elected in 1940. Re-elected in 1942. Re-elected in 1944. Re-elected in 1946 but resigned when elected U.S. Senator.	1923–1943: Population 282,241; Colbert, Jackson, Lauderdale, Lawrence, Limestone, Madison, Morgan
John Sparkman (Huntsville)	Democratic	January 3, 1937 – November 5, 1946	75th 76th 77th 78th 79th	Elected in 1936. Re-elected in 1938. Re-elected in 1940. Re-elected in 1942. Re-elected in 1944. Re-elected in 1946 but resigned when elected U.S. Senator.	1943–1953: Population 300,112; Colbert, Jackson, Lauderdale, Lawrence, Limestone, Madison, Morgan
Vacant		November 5, 1946 – January 28, 1947	79th		1943–1953: Population 300,112; Colbert, Jackson, Lauderdale, Lawrence, Limestone, Madison, Morgan
Robert E. Jones Jr. (Scottsboro)	Democratic	January 28, 1947 – January 3, 1963	80th 81st 82nd 83rd 84th 85th 86th 87th	Elected to finish Sparkman's term. Re-elected in 1948. Re-elected in 1950. Re-elected in 1952. Re-elected in 1954. Re-elected in 1956. Re-elected in 1958. Re-elected in 1960. Redistricted to the at-large district.	1943–1953: Population 300,112; Colbert, Jackson, Lauderdale, Lawrence, Limestone, Madison, Morgan
Robert E. Jones Jr. (Scottsboro)	Democratic	January 28, 1947 – January 3, 1963	80th 81st 82nd 83rd 84th 85th 86th 87th	Elected to finish Sparkman's term. Re-elected in 1948. Re-elected in 1950. Re-elected in 1952. Re-elected in 1954. Re-elected in 1956. Re-elected in 1958. Re-elected in 1960. Redistricted to the at-large district.	1953–1963: Population 321,459; Colbert, Jackson, Lauderdale, Lawrence, Limestone, Madison, Morgan
District inactive		January 3, 1963 – January 3, 1965	88th	All representatives elected at large.	
Robert E. Jones Jr. (Scottsboro)	Democratic	January 3, 1965 – January 3, 1973	89th 90th 91st 92nd	Redistricted from the at-large district and re-elected in 1964. Re-elected in 1966. Re-elected in 1968. Re-elected in 1970. Redistricted to the 5th district.	1965–1973: Population 383,625; Colbert, Jackson, Lauderdale, Lawrence, Limestone, Madison, Morgan
District eliminated January 3, 1973

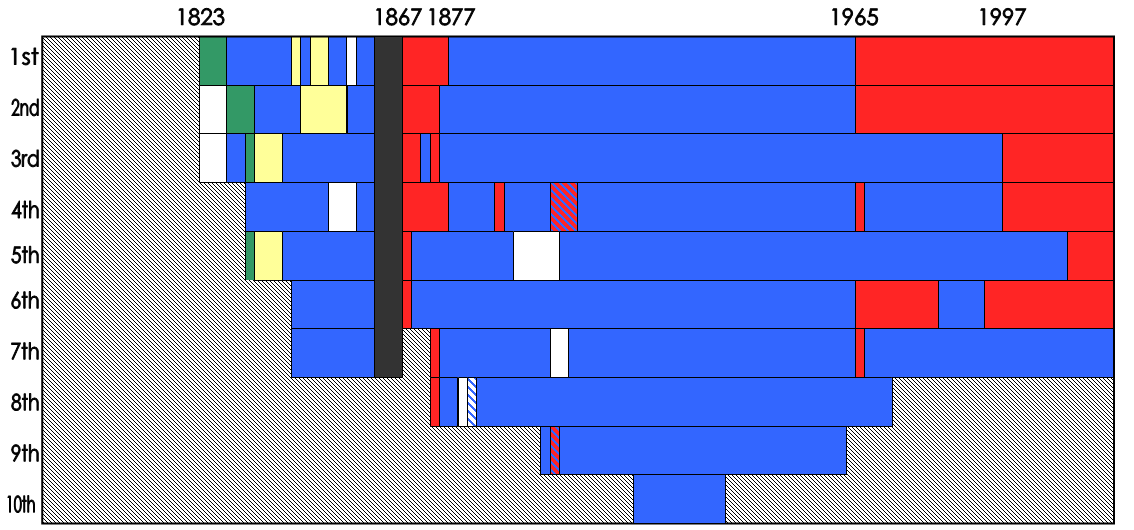
A diagrammatic history of the Alabama House Delegation
