= Urquhart House =

Historic house in Alabama, United States

- U.S. National Register of Historic Places
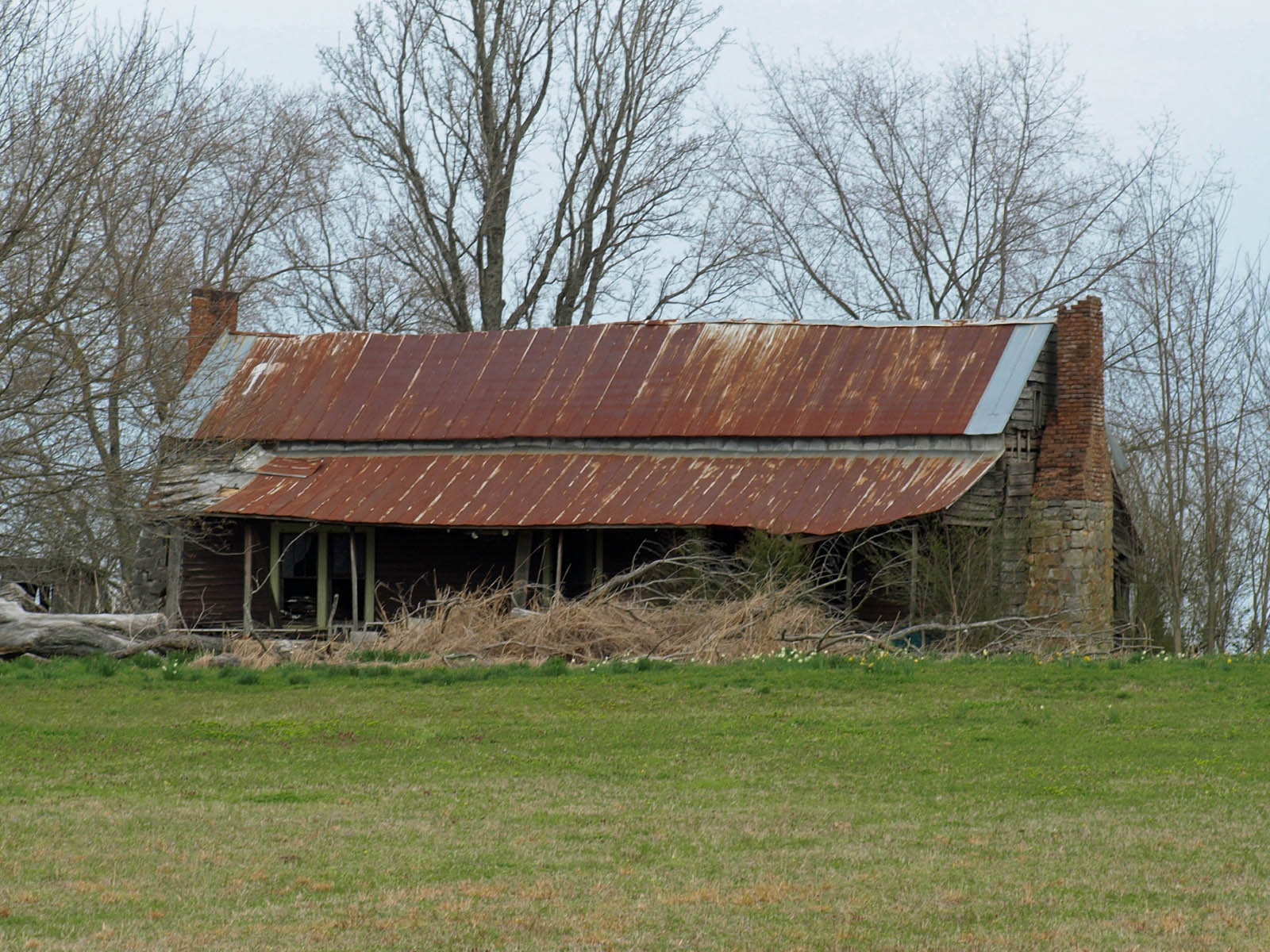
- The house in March 2013

- Location within Huntsville, Alabama Location within Alabama Location within the United States
- Nearest city: Huntsville, Alabama
- Coordinates: 34°51′1″N 86°38′12″W
- Area: 6 acres (2.4 ha)
- Built: 1813
- Architectural style: Federal, Dogtrot
- NRHP reference No.: 92000034
- Added to NRHP: February 13, 1992

The Urquhart House (pronounced Er- Kit) is a historic residence in Huntsville, Alabama. The property was acquired by Allen Urquhart in 1813, and the house was built soon after. The dogtrot house was built in several phases, with the eastern "pen" being the original section. It was originally built as a one-room log house with a 7-foot (2.1-meter) ceiling. The house was extensively modified around 1835; the ceiling was raised to 9 feet 2 inches (2.79 m), and many Federal-period details were added, including beaded chair rails and baseboards, an elaborate mantle, and lath and plastered walls. The second floor and western pen may have been added at this time; most of the original details were removed from the western pen in the early 20th century, making it difficult to date its construction. When it was completed, the house's dogtrot form was established, including loft rooms over both pens and the breezeway. An addition was made in the 1860s or 1870s to the rear of the western pen which features a Greek Revival mantle. In circa 1915–1930, a kitchen was added to the rear of this room, and an enclosed porch was built in the ell along the rear of the house. A front porch was added in the middle of the 20th century.

The house was listed on the National Register of Historic Places in 1992. It was included on the Alabama Historical Commission's Places In Peril list for 2013; after years of neglect, the building is nearing collapse.
