= Sadler House (McCalla, Alabama) =

- U.S. National Register of Historic Places
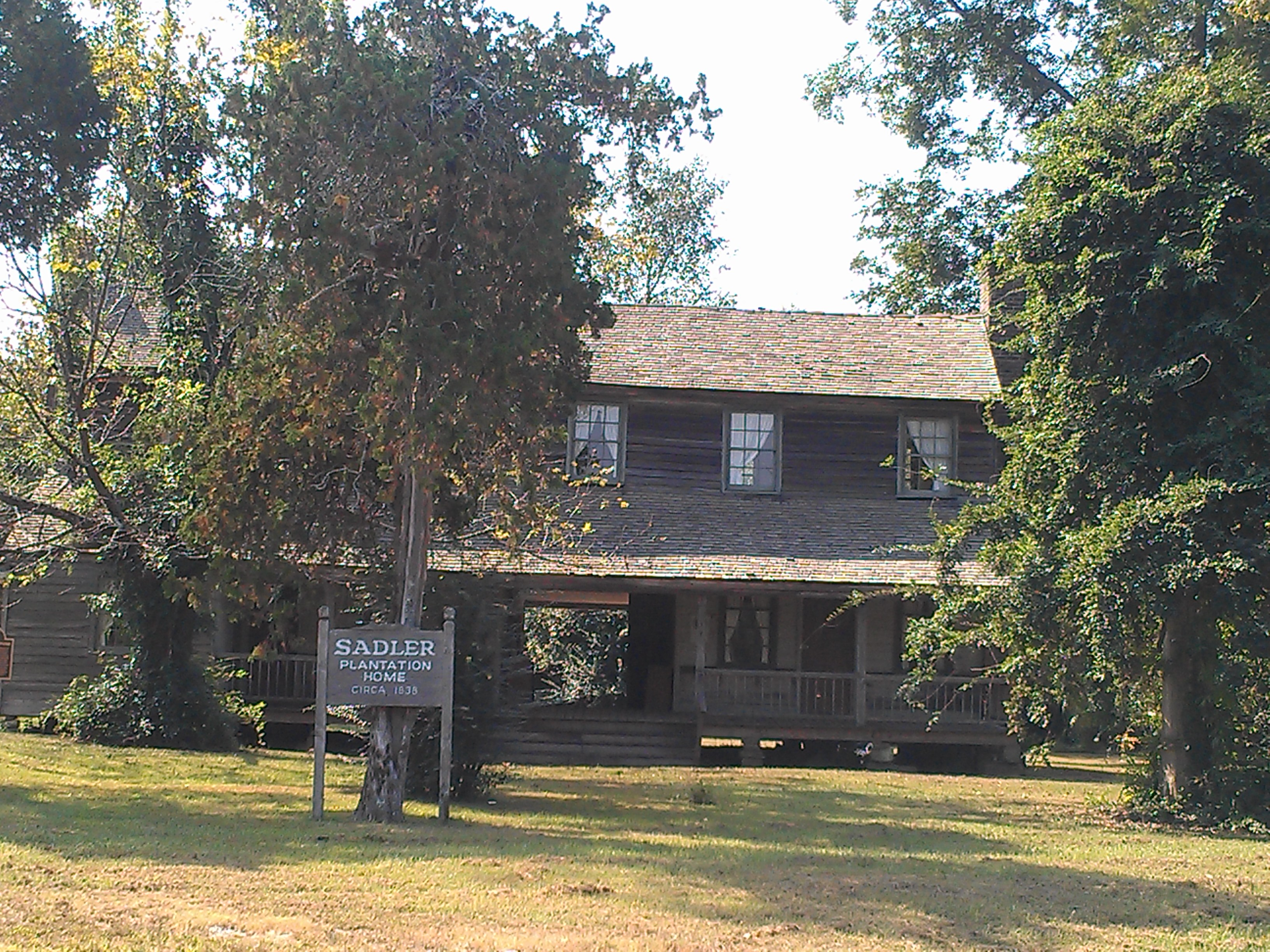

- Location within Alabama Location within the United States
- Nearest city: McCalla, Alabama
- Coordinates: 33°19′0″N 87°0′50″W
- Area: 1 acre (0.40 ha)
- Built: 1838
- Architect: Isaac Wellington Sadler
- Architectural style: Greek Revival, Federal
- NRHP reference No.: 75000315
- Added to NRHP: April 23, 1975

The Sadler House is a frontier I-House with Georgian architectural elements in McCalla, Alabama. The original single pen log house was built by John Loveless, who moved to Alabama from South Carolina in 1816. The home's uniqueness is illustrated by and due to its original constructed form of a single pen log structure, now cocooned within the I-house, and the complex joinery details (akin to furniture joinery) used to hold the structural elements of the original house in place.

After Loveless's death, his widow, Martha Daniel sold the two story clapboard-covered log cabin to Isaac Wellington Sadler. The house was expanded in 1838 by Sadler, a planter and teacher. The two-story wood-frame house has a shed-roofed addition to the rear and a matching front porch structure. The interior is arranged around an open center hall running as a breezeway through the house with two rooms on either side. The hall and one parlor have faux-painted wainscoting. The detailing of the trim in the formal parlor is Greek Revival, while the remainder of the doors are a plain board-and-batten pattern.

The Sadler House was placed on the National Register of Historic Places on April 23, 1975. It is owned by the West Jefferson Historical Society.
