= Archeological Site No. 1LA102 =

Archaeological site in Alabama, United States

- U.S. National Register of Historic Places
- Nearest city: Haleyville, Alabama
- Area: 1 acre (0.40 ha)
- NRHP reference No.: 85003117
- Added to NRHP: December 14, 1985

Archeological Site No. 1LA102 is a bluff shelter site in Lawrence County, Alabama. The shelter measures 58 meters (190 feet) in length, between 11 and 15 meters (36 and 49 ft) deep, with ceiling heights between 5 and 7 meters (16 and 23 ft). There is a small spring in the back of the shelter, which along with the dry, level floor, offered an excellent habitation area. The site is believed to have been inhabited beginning in the late Lithic stage through the Late Woodland period. Excavations have uncovered trash pits, hearths, and post-mold patterns, as well as food remains and a partially restorable vessel.

The site was listed on the National Register of Historic Places in 1985.
