= Joel Eddins House =

Historic house in Alabama, United States

- U.S. National Register of Historic Places
- Alabama Register of Landmarks and Heritage
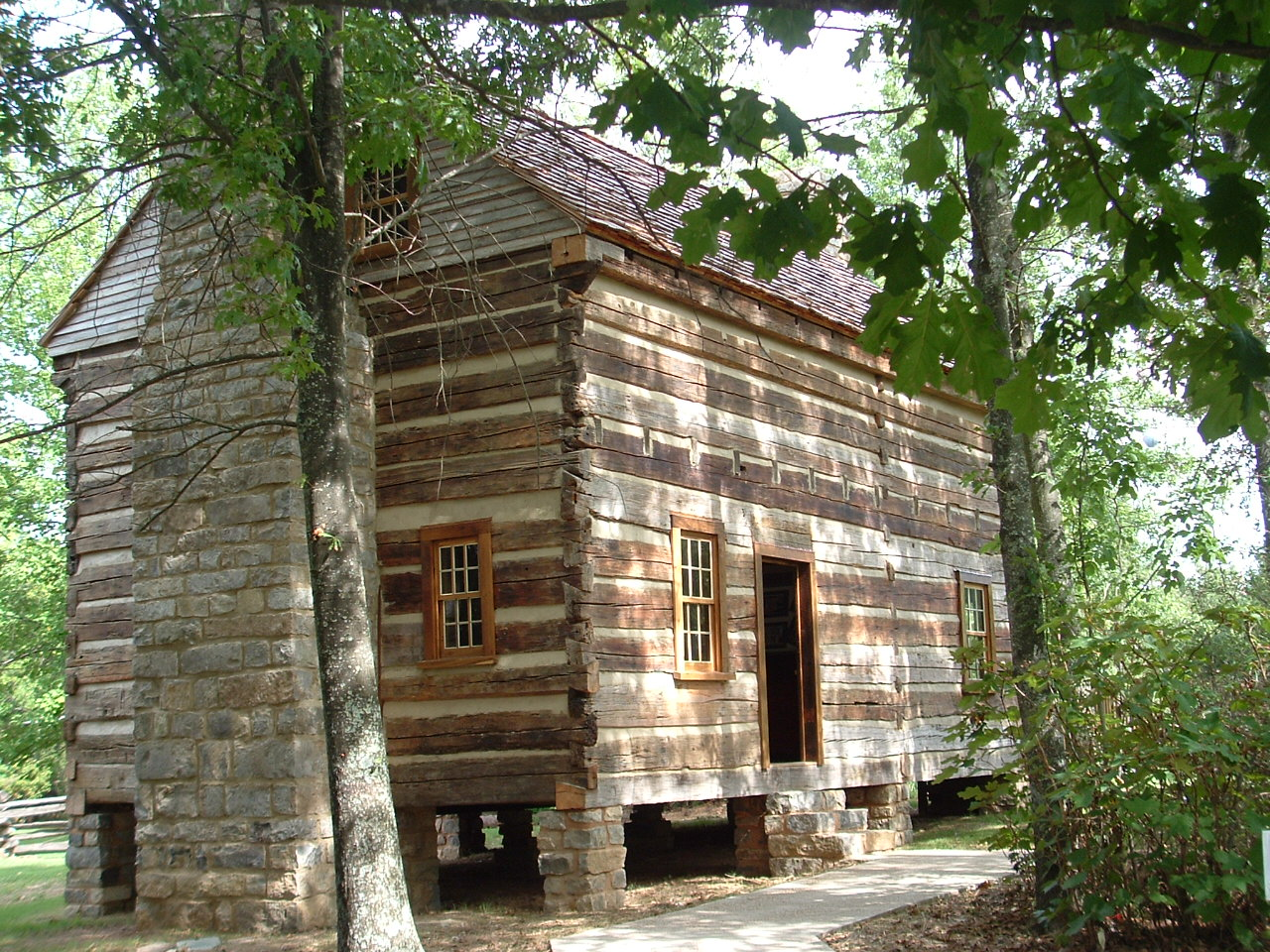
- The House in 2016

- Location within Huntsville, Alabama Location within Alabama Location within the United States
- Location: Burritt on the Mountain, Huntsville, Alabama
- Coordinates: 34°43′01″N 86°32′23″W
- Area: 28 acres (11 ha)
- Built: 1810
- Built by: Joel Eddins
- Architectural style: Hall and parlor
- NRHP reference No.: 96001004

Significant dates
- Added to NRHP: September 12, 1996
- Designated ARLH: November 2, 1990

The Joel Eddins House is a hall-and-parlor log house on the grounds of Burritt on the Mountain in Huntsville, Alabama, and is the oldest documented building in the state. The house was built in 1810 near present-day Ardmore in Limestone County, Alabama, by Joel Eddins, a settler from Abbeville County, South Carolina. It was moved from its original site to Burritt in 2007. The 1 1/2-story house is a hall-and-parlor style, not commonly found in Alabama. An addition was built in the 1930s to the rear, which wrapped around part of the east side; it was not retained when the house was moved to Burritt. The gable roof has brick chimneys on the ends. The main entry opens into the larger "hall" room, which contains a fireplace on the west wall and doors on the other two. A quarter-turn staircase in the northeast corner leads to the upper floor. The eastern door leads to the "parlor" with another fireplace and staircase. The upper floor rooms are the same size as those below, and are not connected. Each room has two small, four-pane windows on either side of the chimney. The 1930s addition contained a bedroom, bathroom, and kitchen. The house was listed on the National Register of Historic Places in 1996.
