= Joseph Wheeler Plantation =

- Pond Spring, The General Joe Wheeler Home
- U.S. National Register of Historic Places
- U.S. Historic district
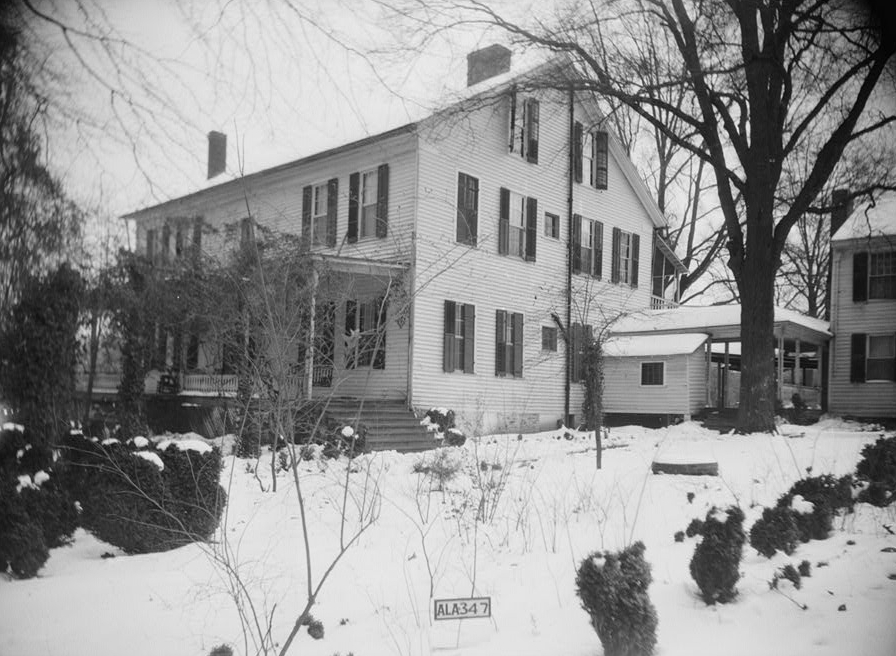
- The Wheeler House, built in the 1870s. It is the youngest of the three houses on the property.

- Location within Alabama Location within the United States
- Nearest city: Wheeler, Alabama
- Coordinates: 34°38′56″N 87°15′21″W
- Built: 1818-80
- NRHP reference No.: 77000209
- Added to NRHP: April 13, 1977

The Joseph Wheeler Plantation, formally known as The Joseph Wheeler Plantation, is a historic plantation complex and historic district in the Tennessee River Valley in Wheeler, Alabama. The property contains twelve historically significant structures dating from 1818 to the 1880s. It was added to the National Register of Historic Places on April 13, 1977, due to its association with Joseph Wheeler.

== History ==
The plantation at Pond Spring was first established by the John P. Hickman family in 1818. They were among the earliest settlers of Lawrence County. By 1820 Hickman's family had grown to 11 members and he owned 56 slaves. Benjamin Sherrod, a planter from Halifax County, North Carolina with more than 300 slaves, bought Pond Spring and its 1,760 acres (710 ha) from Hickman in 1827. In the 1830s his son, Felix Sherrod, greatly expanded the larger of the two log dogtrot cabins on the property into what today is known as the Sherrod House. It is a vernacular interpretation of the Federal style. The smaller dogtrot came to be used as housing for slaves.

Upon Felix's death the plantation was inherited by his son, also named Benjamin. Benjamin Sherrod married Daniella Jones from the nearby Caledonia plantation in 1859, but he died prematurely in 1861. Daniella Sherrod met Joseph Wheeler, a general in the Confederate States Army from Augusta, Georgia, during his visit to the area in 1863. They married following the American Civil War and lived in New Orleans for the next four years. They returned to Lawrence County in the early 1870s and built a new home, adjacent to the older Sherrod House.

Beginning in 1880, Wheeler served multiple terms as a United States representative from Alabama until he retired from politics in 1900. In 1898, Wheeler volunteered for the Spanish–American War and received an appointment to major general of volunteers by President William McKinley. He assumed command of the cavalry division, which included Theodore Roosevelt's Rough Riders. Wheeler next served in the Philippine–American War in 1899. He commanded the First Brigade in Arthur MacArthur's Second Division during the Philippine–American War until January 1900. During this period, Wheeler was mustered out of the volunteer service and commissioned a brigadier general in the regular army, both on June 16, 1900. He retired on September 10, 1900, and moved to New York City, where he died in 1906.

His daughter, Annie, lived on the plantation until her death in 1955. It remained in the Wheeler family until 1993, when it was donated by them to the state of Alabama and the Alabama Historical Commission.

== Visiting ==
The property is managed by the Alabama Historical Commission. AHC has completed restoring the Wheeler House, which is now open to the public.

== See also ==
- National Register of Historic Places listings in Lawrence County, Alabama
