= William M. Lowe =

American politician (1842–1882)

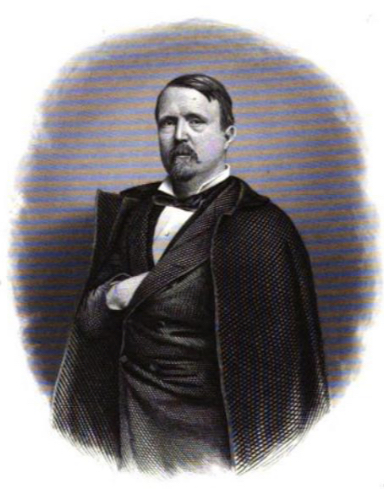

Member of the U.S. House of Representatives from Alabama's 8th district
- In office June 3, 1882 – October 12, 1882
- Preceded by: Joseph Wheeler
- Succeeded by: Joseph Wheeler
- In office March 4, 1879 – March 3, 1881
- Preceded by: William Willis Garth
- Succeeded by: Joseph Wheeler

Member of the Alabama House of Representatives
- In office 1870–1878

Personal details
- Born: William Manning Lowe; June 12, 1842 Huntsville, Alabama, U.S.
- Died: October 12, 1882 (aged 40) Huntsville, Alabama, U.S.
- Cause of death: Tuberculosis
- Resting place: Maple Hill Cemetery
- Party: Greenback
- Education: University of Virginia

Military service
- Allegiance: Confederate States
- Branch/service: Confederate States Army
- Years of service: 1861–1865
- Rank: Lieutenant colonel
- Battles/wars: American Civil War

William Manning Lowe (June 12, 1842 – October 12, 1882) was an American politician and Confederate Civil War veteran who served the state of Alabama in the U.S. House of Representatives between 1879 and 1881 and in 1882.

== Biography ==
William M. Lowe was born on June 12, 1842, in Huntsville, Alabama. He attended the Wesleyan University at Florence, Alabama and the University of Virginia.

=== Civil War ===
During the American Civil War he enlisted in the Confederate States Army, eventually rising to the rank of lieutenant colonel.

=== Legal career ===
He studied law, was admitted to the bar, and practiced in Huntsville. He was solicitor of the fifth judicial circuit between 1865 and 1867.

=== Political career ===
In 1870, he was elected to the Alabama House of Representatives, and was a delegate to the Alabama constitutional convention of 1875.

=== Congressional election dispute ===
Lowe was elected in 1878 as a Greenback to the U.S. House of Representatives, but in initial results was defeated for reelection by Joseph Wheeler in 1880, 601 votes for Lowe having been declared illegal by election judges. In a highly contentious recount that lasted over a year, Lowe successfully contested Wheeler's election and assumed the office on June 3, 1882.

Lowe only served four months in Congress prior to his death.

=== Death and burial ===
Lowe died of tuberculosis at his home in Huntsville on October 12, 1882. He was buried in Maple Hill Cemetery in Huntsville.

Following Lowe's death, Wheeler won a special election to fill the vacant congressional seat and served the remaining weeks of the term.

== See also ==
- List of members of the United States Congress who died in office (1790–1899)

== Notes ==
U.S. House of Representatives
Preceded by William W. Garth	Member of the U.S. House of Representatives from Alabama's 8th congressional district March 4, 1879 - March 3, 1881	Succeeded by Joseph Wheeler
Preceded by Joseph Wheeler	Member of the U.S. House of Representatives from Alabama's 8th congressional district June 3, 1882 - October 12, 1882	Succeeded by Vacant
