= Joseph Wheeler =

American military officer and politician (1836–1906)

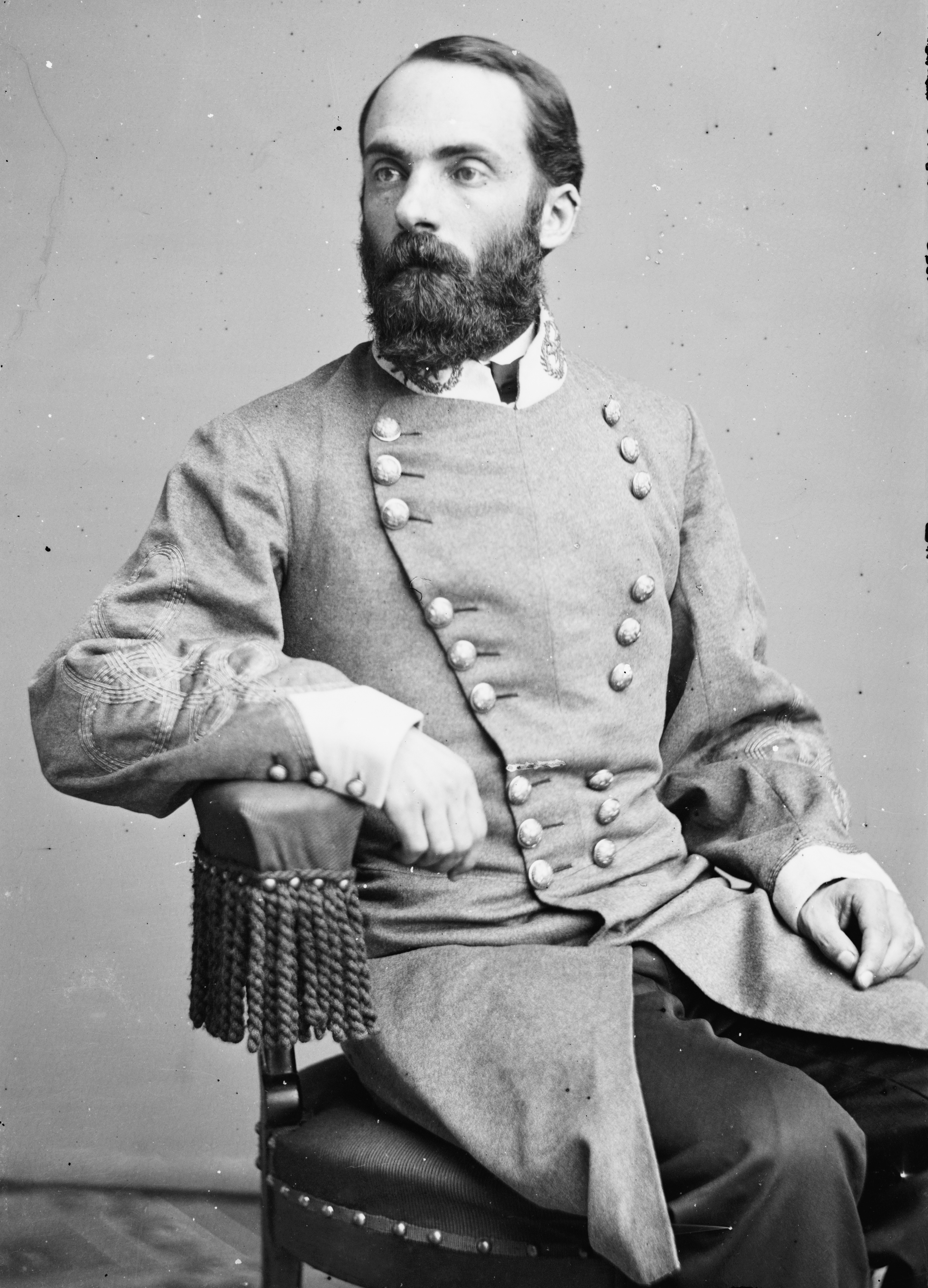
- Wheeler in uniform, c. 1862

Member of the U.S. House of Representatives from Alabama's 8th district
- In office March 4, 1885 – April 20, 1900
- Preceded by: Luke Pryor
- Succeeded by: William Richardson
- In office January 15, 1883 – March 3, 1883
- Preceded by: William M. Lowe
- Succeeded by: Luke Pryor
- In office March 4, 1881 – June 3, 1882
- Preceded by: William M. Lowe
- Succeeded by: William M. Lowe

Personal details
- Born: September 10, 1836 Augusta, Georgia, U.S.
- Died: January 25, 1906 (aged 69) New York City, U.S.
- Resting place: Arlington National Cemetery
- Party: Democratic
- Education: United States Military Academy
- Nickname(s): Fightin' Joe, Little Joe, the War Child

Military service
- Allegiance: United States; Confederate States
- Branch/service: United States Army; Confederate States Army
- Years of service: 1859–1861 (U.S.); 1861–1865 (C.S.); 1898–1900 (U.S.)
- Rank: Major General (C.S.); Major general (U.S.)
- Battles/wars: See battles: American Indian Wars; American Civil War; Battle of Shiloh; Siege of Corinth; Kentucky Campaign; Stones River Campaign; Chickamauga campaign; Tullahoma campaign; Chattanooga campaign; Knoxville campaign; Atlanta campaign; Savannah campaign; Carolinas campaign; Spanish–American War; Battle of San Juan Hill; Philippine–American War

Joseph "Fighting Joe" Wheeler (September 10, 1836 – January 25, 1906) was an American military officer and politician. He was a cavalry general in the Confederate States Army during the American Civil War, and then a general in the United States Army during both the Spanish-American and Philippine–American Wars near the turn of the twentieth century. For much of the Civil War, he was the senior cavalry general in the Army of Tennessee and fought in most of its battles in the Western Theater.

Between the Civil War and the Spanish–American War, Wheeler served multiple terms as a U.S. representative from the state of Alabama as a Democrat.

== Early life ==
Although of old New England ancestry (descended from the English Puritans who came to New England during the Puritan migration to New England), Joseph Wheeler was born near Augusta, Georgia, and spent some of his early childhood growing up with relatives in Derby, Connecticut, while also spending about half of each year in Georgia. Joseph Wheeler and Julia Knox Hull Wheeler were his parents. He was the grandson of Brigadier General William Hull, a veteran of the American Revolution.

Wheeler was partially brought up in the northern United States, and was appointed to the United States Military Academy at West Point from the state of New York.

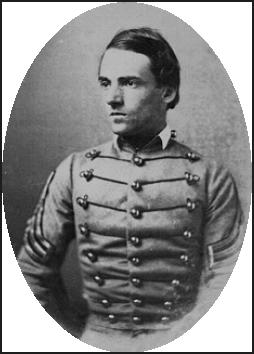
Wheeler at West Point

Wheeler entered West Point in July 1854, barely meeting the height requirement at the time for entry. He graduated on July 1, 1859, placing 19th out of 22 cadets, and was commissioned a brevet second lieutenant in the 1st U.S. Dragoons. He attended the U.S. Army Cavalry School located in Carlisle, Pennsylvania, and upon completion was transferred on June 26, 1860, to the Regiment of Mounted Rifles stationed in the New Mexico Territory.

It was while stationed in New Mexico and fighting in a skirmish with Indians that Joseph Wheeler picked up the nickname "Fighting Joe". On September 1, 1860, he was promoted to the rank of second lieutenant.

== Civil War ==
=== Early service ===
At the start of the Civil War, Wheeler entered the Confederate States Army on March 16 as a first lieutenant in the Georgia state militia artillery and then was assigned to Fort Barrancas off of Pensacola, Florida, reporting to Maj. Gen. Braxton Bragg. His resignation from the U.S. Army was accepted on April 22, 1861. He was ordered to Huntsville, Alabama, to take command of the newly formed 19th Alabama Infantry Regiment and was promoted to colonel on September 4.

Wheeler and the 19th Alabama fought well under Bragg at the Battle of Shiloh in April 1862. During the Siege of Corinth in April and May, Wheeler's men on picket duty repeatedly clashed with U.S. patrols. Serving as acting brigade commander, Wheeler burned the bridges over the Tuscumbia River to cover the Confederate retreat to Tupelo, Mississippi.

=== Middle Tennessee ===
From September to October, Wheeler transferred to the cavalry branch and commanded the 2nd Cavalry Brigade of the Left Wing in the Army of Mississippi. During the Confederate Heartland Offensive, Wheeler aggressively maintained contact with the U.S. Army. He began to suffer from poor relations with Nathan Bedford Forrest, when Bragg reassigned most of Forrest's men to Wheeler, sending Forrest to Murfreesboro, Tennessee to recruit a new brigade. Wheeler fought at the Battle of Perryville in October and, after the fight, performed an excellent rearguard action protecting the army's retreat. He was promoted to brigadier general on October 30 and led the cavalry belonging to the Second Corps, Army of Tennessee, from November to December. During the action at La Vergne, Tennessee, on November 27, Wheeler was wounded by an artillery shell that exploded near him.

In December 1862, the U.S. Army of the Cumberland began to advance from Nashville against Bragg's army. Now commanding all of the Army of Tennessee's cavalry, Wheeler skirmished aggressively to delay their advance. He drove into the rear of the U.S. army, destroying hundreds of wagons and capturing more than 700 prisoners. After the Battle of Stones River, as Bragg's army withdrew to the Duck River line, Wheeler struck the U.S. supply lines at Harpeth Shoals on January 12–13, burning three steamboats and capturing more than 400 prisoners. Bragg recommended that Wheeler be promoted as a "just reward", and he became a major general on January 20, 1863.

Wheeler led the army's Cavalry Corps from January to November 24, then from December to November 15, 1864. For his actions on January 12–13, 1863, Wheeler and his troopers received the Thanks of the Confederate Congress on May 1, 1863.

In February 1863, Wheeler and Forrest attacked Fort Donelson at Dover, Tennessee, but the small U.S. garrison repulsed them. Forrest angrily told Wheeler, "Tell [General Bragg] that I will be in my coffin before I will fight again under your command". Bragg dealt with this rivalry in the Tullahoma Campaign by assigning Wheeler to guard the army's right flank while Forrest guarded the left. A Union cavalry advance on Shelbyville on June 27 trapped Wheeler and 50 of his men on the north side of the Duck River, forcing Wheeler to plunge his horse over a 15-foot embankment and escape through the rain-swollen river.

=== Chickamauga and Chattanooga ===
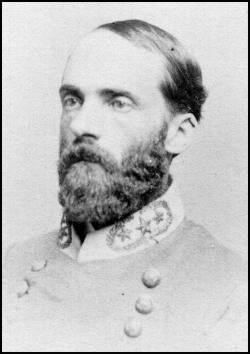
Joseph Wheeler during the Civil War

Wheeler and his troopers guarded the army's left flank at the Battle of Chickamauga in September 1863. After the routed U.S. army collected in Chattanooga, Gen. Bragg sent Wheeler's men into central Tennessee to destroy railroads and Federal supply lines in a major raid. On October 2, his attack at Anderson's Cross Roads (also known as Powell's Crossroads) destroyed more than 700 U.S. supply wagons, tightening the Confederate siege of Chattanooga. Pursued by U.S. soldiers, Wheeler advanced to McMinnville and captured its 600-man garrison. There were more actions at Murfreesboro and Farmington. Still, by October 9, Wheeler safely crossed the Tennessee River at Muscle Shoals, Alabama. The extensive raid and a subsequent northern movement to assist Longstreet in his siege of Knoxville would cause the mounted arm of the army to miss the Chattanooga campaign (November 23–25). Wheeler covered Bragg's retreat from Chattanooga following the Union breakthrough at Missionary Ridge on November 25 and received a wound in his foot as his cavalry and Maj. Gen. Patrick Cleburne's infantry fought at the Battle of Ringgold Gap on November 27.

=== Georgia and the Carolinas ===
During U.S. Maj. Gen. William Tecumseh Sherman's Atlanta campaign, Wheeler's cavalry corps screened the flanks of the Army of Tennessee as Gen. Joseph E. Johnston drew back from several positions toward Atlanta. In July, Sherman sent two large cavalry columns to destroy the railroads supplying the defenders of Atlanta. With fewer than 5,000 cavalrymen, Wheeler defeated the enemy raids, capturing one of the two commanding generals, Maj. Gen. George Stoneman (the highest-ranking U.S. prisoner of war). In August, Wheeler's corps crossed the Chattahoochee River in an attempt to destroy the railroad Sherman was using to supply his force from Chattanooga. Wheeler's men captured the town of Dalton, but he failed to defeat the U.S. garrison protected in a nearby fort. Wheeler then took his men into East Tennessee, crossing the Tennessee River above Knoxville. His raid continued to the west, causing minor interruptions in the Nashville and Chattanooga Railroad and then continued south through Franklin, Tennessee, until he recrossed the Tennessee at Tuscumbia, Alabama. The raid Wheeler was ordered to undertake was described by historian Ed Bearss as a "Confederate disaster" because it caused minimal damage to the United States while denying Gen. John Bell Hood, now in command of the Army of Tennessee, the direct support of his cavalry arm. Without accurate intelligence of Sherman's dispositions, Hood lost the Battle of Jonesborough and was forced to evacuate Atlanta. Wheeler rendezvoused with Hood's army in early October after destroying the railroad bridge at Resaca. That said, the blame for this defeat cannot be laid at Wheeler's feet.

In late 1864, Wheeler's cavalry did not accompany Hood on his Franklin–Nashville Campaign back into Tennessee and was virtually the only effective Confederate force to oppose Sherman's March to the Sea to Savannah. However, his resistance to Sherman did little to comfort Georgia civilians, and lax discipline within his command caused great dissatisfaction. Robert Toombs said, "I hope to God he will never get back to Georgia". Maj. Gen. D. H. Hill wrote that "the whole of Georgia is full of bitter complaints of Wheeler's cavalry". A telling encounter between Wheeler and Sherman is documented in one of Sherman's reports. This incident occurred after Gen. Jefferson C. Davis decided to dismantle a pontoon bridge to distance his army from a group of escaped slaves who sought refuge and safety with the Union forces. According to Sherman's account, Wheeler ordered his cavalry to charge the refugees. This action forced the men, women, and children into the water, where it is presumed many drowned.

Wheeler and his men continued to attempt to stop Sherman in the 1865 Carolinas campaign. He defeated a U.S. cavalry force under Brig. Gen. Judson Kilpatrick in South Carolina at the Battle of Aiken on February 11. He was replaced as cavalry chief by Lt. Gen. Wade Hampton III and fought under him at the Battle of Bentonville on March 19–20. While attempting to cover Confederate President Jefferson Davis's flight south and west in May, Wheeler was captured at Conyer's Station just east of Atlanta. He had intended to reach the Trans-Mississippi and Gen. Edmund Kirby Smith, still resisting out west, and had with him three officers from his staff and 11 privates when he was taken. Wheeler was imprisoned for two months, first at Fort Monroe and then in solitary confinement at Fort Delaware, where he was paroled on June 8.

During his career in the Confederate States Army, Wheeler was wounded three times, lost 36 staff officers to combat, and a total of 16 horses were shot from under him. Military historian Ezra J. Warner believed that Wheeler's actions leading cavalry in the conflict "were second only to those of Bedford Forrest".

== U.S. House of Representatives ==
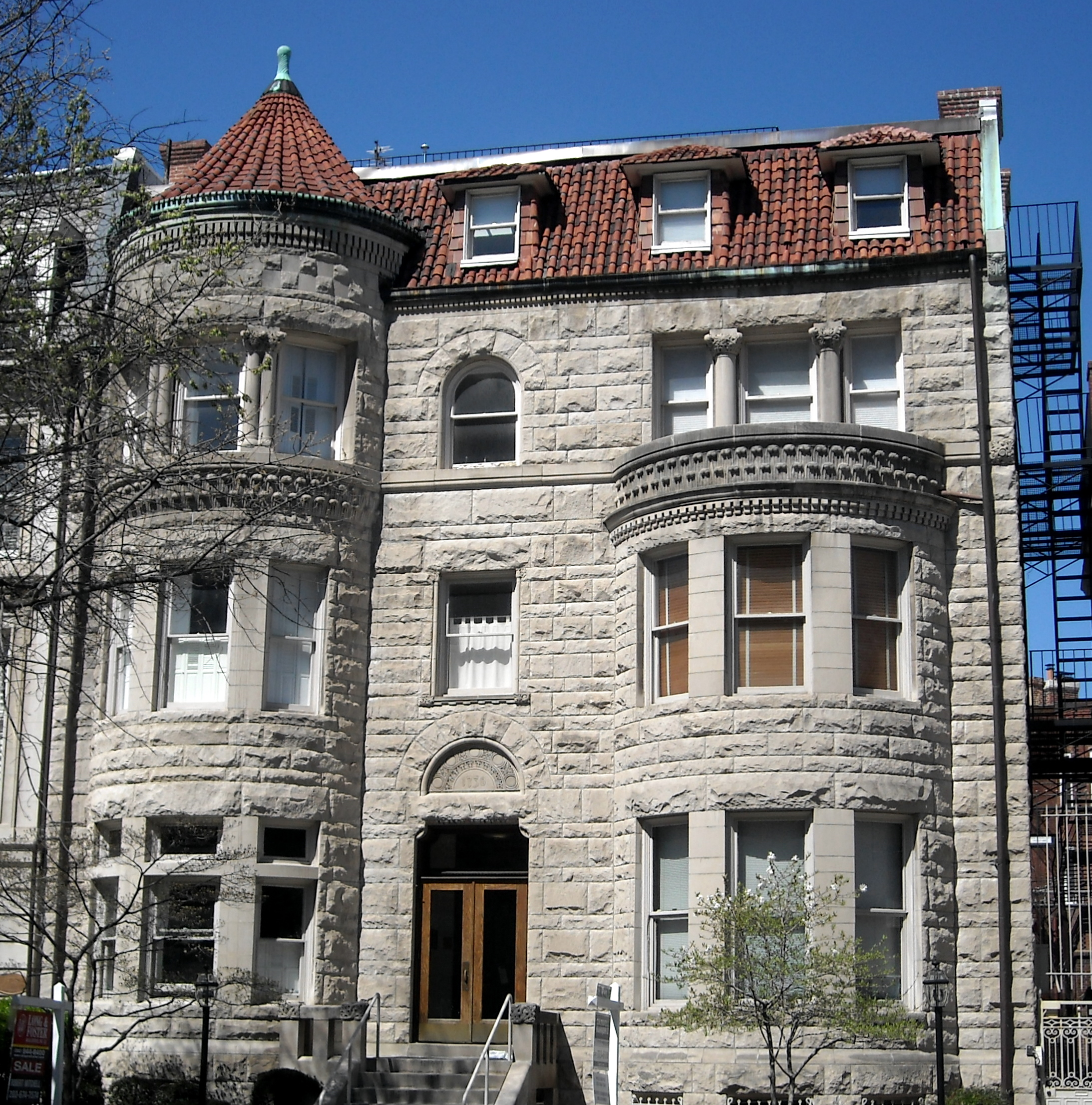
Wheeler's former residence in Washington, D.C.

After the war, Wheeler became a planter and a lawyer near Courtland, Alabama, where he married and raised a family. His home, Pond Spring, in an area now known as Wheeler, Alabama, is a historical site owned by the Alabama Historical Commission.

In 1880, Wheeler was elected from Alabama as a Democrat to the United States House of Representatives. Wheeler's opponent, Greenback incumbent William M. Lowe, contested the election. After a contentious legal battle that lasted over a year, Lowe was declared the winner and assumed the seat on June 3, 1882. Lowe served only four months before dying of tuberculosis. Wheeler won a special election to return and serve the remaining weeks of the term.

Wheeler supported the election of Luke Pryor in 1882 and did not run for reelection, but was elected again in 1884 and re-elected to seven subsequent terms before resigning in 1900. While in Congress, Wheeler strove to heal the breach between the slave states and the United States and championed policies to help rebuild the southern U.S. economy. At the 1884 Democratic National Convention, Wheeler supported Grover Cleveland to be the Democratic Party's nominee for President of the United States.

In foreign policy, Wheeler was outspokenly Anglophile; he sought a closer relationship between the United States and the British Empire and is regarded as one of the earliest advocates of what would later be called the "Special Relationship" between the United States of America and the United Kingdom. When he was asked during the 1888 United States presidential election if he believed that President Grover Cleveland was "as pro-British as people say", Wheeler replied by saying, "No, but he ought to be". While in Washington DC between 1886 and 1887, he formed a friendship with Lionel Sackville-West, 2nd Baron Sackville, the British Envoy Extraordinary and Minister Plenipotentiary to the United States. He described Sackville West as "an absolute gentleman" and "very forward" as well as "manful" and "impeccably honest". By contrast, he described French President Jules Grévy as "a dumb sumbitch" in a statement which he later refused to retract, despite pressure from allies in Washington DC to do so.

In January 1890, when House Speaker Thomas Brackett Reed began the process of eliminating the disappearing quorum by calling the names of House members who refused to answer, Wheeler climbed onto one of the desks and then proceeded to leap from desk to desk in an attempt to reach the center and stop the Speaker.

== Spanish–American War ==
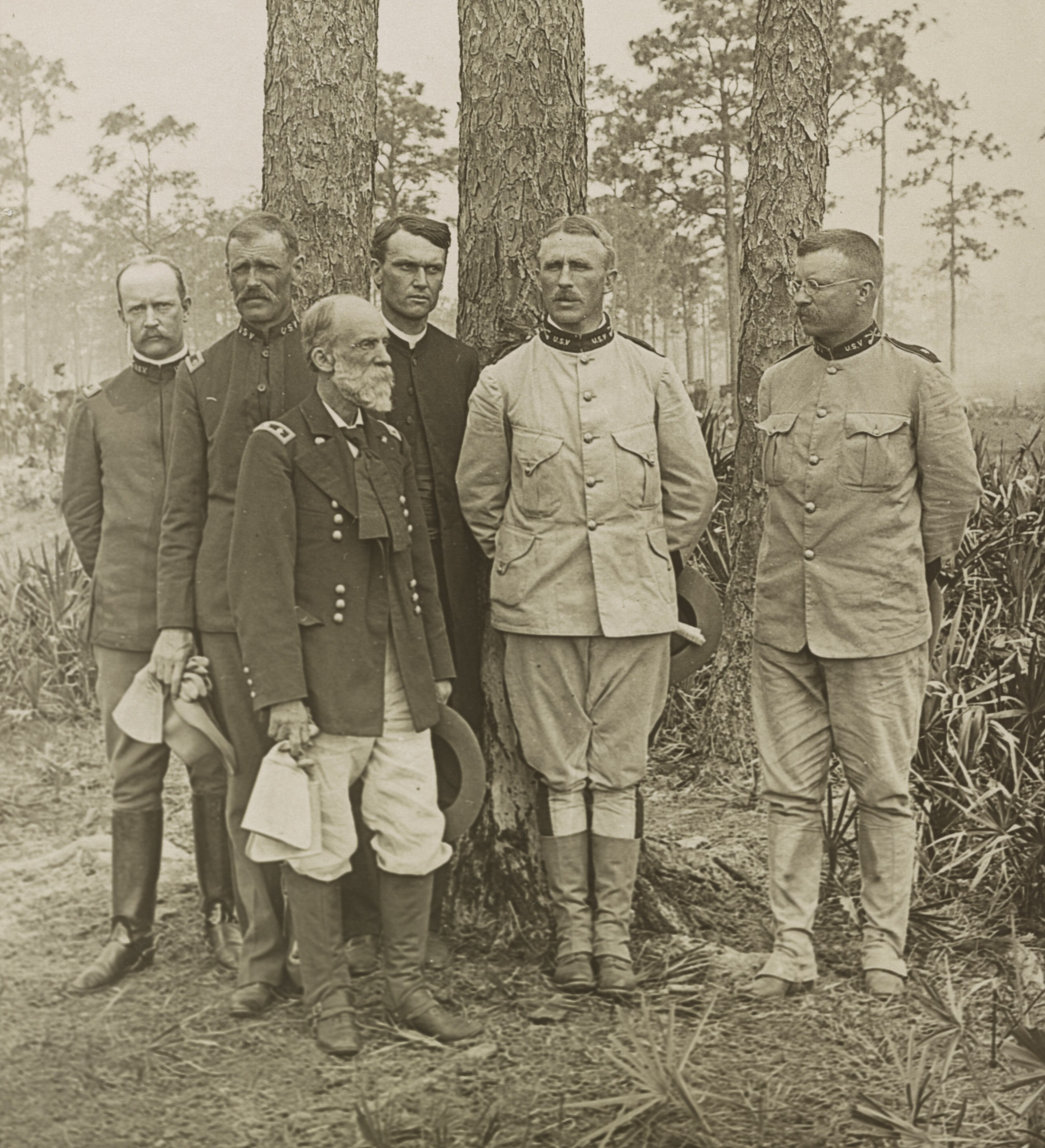
Staff of the 1st US Volunteer Regiment, the "Rough Riders" in Tampa – Lt. Col. Roosevelt is on the right, Leonard Wood is next to him and bearded former Civil War Confederate general Joseph Wheeler is standing in front. Maj. George Dunn is on the far left and Major Alexander Oswald Brodie is next to him.

In 1898, Wheeler, now aged 61, volunteered for the Spanish–American War, receiving an appointment to major general of volunteers from President William McKinley. He assumed command of the cavalry division, which included Theodore Roosevelt's Rough Riders, and was nominally second-in-command of the Fifth Army Corps. He sailed for Cuba and was charged with scouting for the U.S. advance by General William Rufus Shafter, overall commander of V Corps. He was ordered not to engage the enemy on his own until the American troop disembarkation had been completed.

Approaching Las Guasimas de Sevilla on June 24, American reports suggested the Spaniards were digging in with a field gun; however, Cuban scouts contradicted these, revealing the Spaniards were preparing to abandon their position. In fact, the Spanish troops at the position had received orders to fall back on Santiago. Wheeler requested the assistance of the attached Cuban forces in an immediate attack, but their commander, Col. Gonzales Clavel, refused. Wheeler attacked anyway, rushing his men forward with two guns to the front. Colonel Young's brigade led the advance against the Spanish columns in what came to be called the Battle of Las Guasimas, the first major engagement of the war.

During the excitement of the battle, Wheeler is said to have called out, "Let's go, boys! We've got the damn Yankees on the run again!" Wheeler's forces moved to encircle the Spaniards' first battle line, assaulting its front and right flank, but were repelled. During a pause in the fighting, both sides reinforced their positions. The Spaniards sent forward two companies of the San Fernando Battalion, along with the artillery. After midday, the U.S. attack was renewed, but Spanish Comandante Andrés Alcañiz, leading the Provisional de Puerto Rico Battalion, once again checked the American assault.

After halting the American advance, the Spanish resumed their ongoing withdrawal toward Santiago's outer defenses according to their original plans. The battle had cost U.S. forces 17 dead and 52 wounded, while Spanish forces suffered seven dead and seven wounded.

Wheeler fell seriously ill during the campaign and turned over command of the division to Brig. Gen. Samuel S. Sumner. Wheeler was still incapacitated in July when the Battle of San Juan Hill began, but once he heard the sound of guns, the "War Child" returned to the front despite his illness. Being the senior officer at the front, he first issued orders to the 1st Division, under Jacob F. Kent, before returning to his own command. Upon taking the heights, Wheeler assured General William R. Shafter that the position could be held against a counterattack. He led the division through the Siege of Santiago and was a senior member of the peace commission.

Wheeler's youngest son died shortly after his return from serving in Cuba; he drowned while swimming in the ocean. When back in the United States, Wheeler commanded the convalescent camp of the army at Montauk Point, now a state park in New York.

== Philippine–American War ==
Wheeler sailed for the Philippines to fight in the Philippine–American War, arriving in August 1899. He commanded the First Brigade in Arthur MacArthur's Second Division during the Philippine–American War until January 1900. During this period, Wheeler was mustered out of the volunteer service and commissioned a brigadier general in the regular army, reentering the organization he had resigned from over 39 years before, both on June 16, 1900. After hostilities, he commanded the Department of the Lakes until his retirement on September 10, 1900, and moved to New York City.

== Later life ==
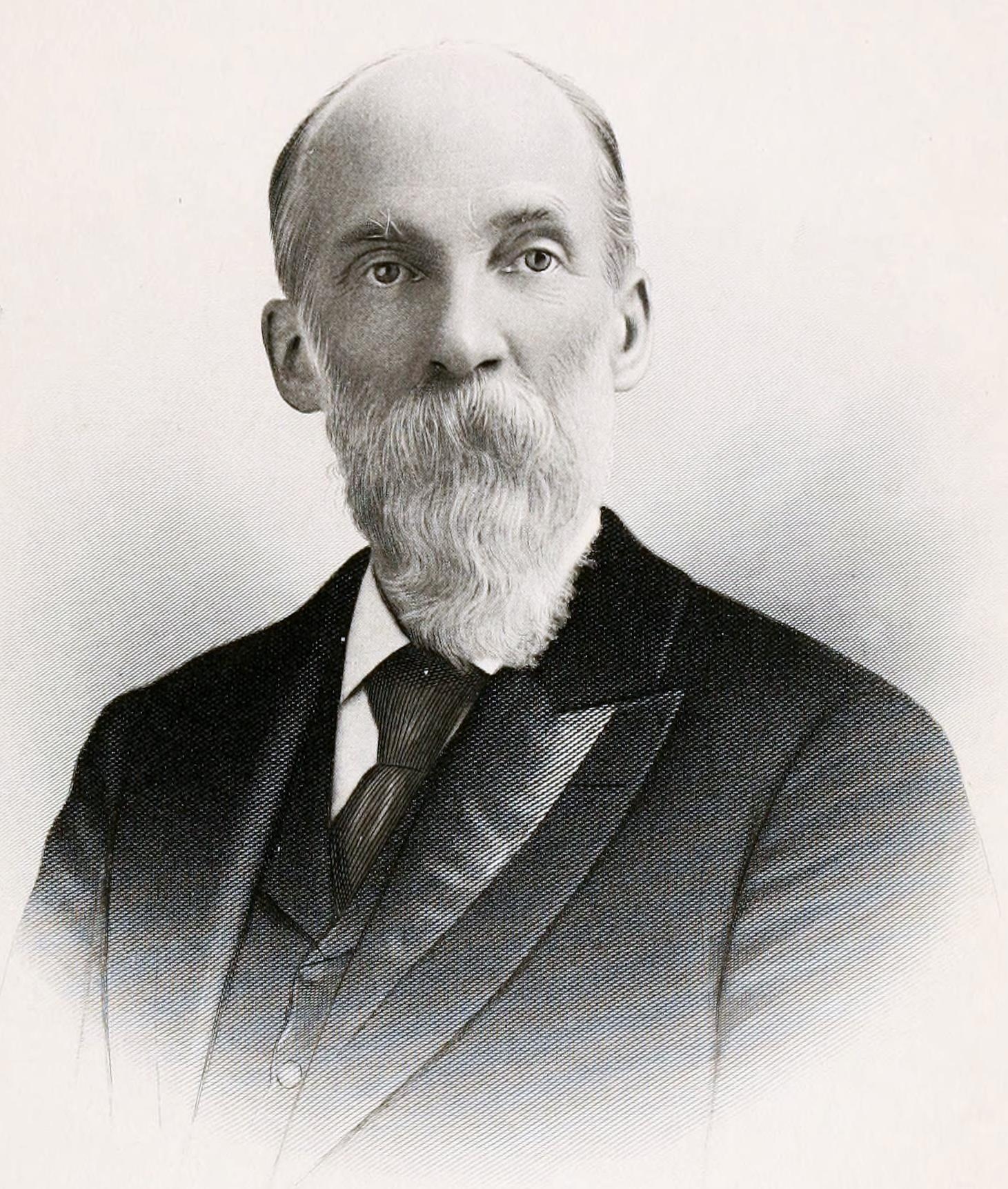
Wheeler in later life

Wheeler wrote several books on military history and strategy and civil subjects. His first was A Revised System of Cavalry Tactics, for the Use of the Cavalry and Mounted Infantry, C.S.A. in 1863, a manual that saw use by the Confederacy. His other works include: Fitz-John Porter in 1883, The Santiago Campaign in 1898, Confederate Military History: Alabama in 1899, and Report on the Island of Guam in 1900. Wheeler also co-wrote several more books throughout the rest of his life, the last of which, The New America and the Far East: A Picturesque and Historic Description of These Lands and Peoples, was published in 1907, after his death.

Wheeler also appeared in an early film called Surrender of General Toral (1898) with William Rufus Shafter.

While attending the hundredth-anniversary celebration of the U.S. Military Academy (West Point, New York) in 1902, Wheeler approached the old West Point hotel, where his Confederate comrades James Longstreet and Edward Porter Alexander were seated on the porch. At the festivities, Wheeler wore the dress uniform of his most recent rank, that of a general in the U.S. Army. Longstreet recognized him coming near and reportedly said, "Joe, I hope that Almighty God takes me before he does you, for I want to be within the gates of hell to hear Jubal Early cuss you in the blue uniform." (Longstreet did predecease Wheeler, dying in January 1904.)

General Wheeler was a member of the District of Columbia Society of the Sons of the American Revolution (joined in 1898) and the Society of Colonial Wars.

After a prolonged illness, Wheeler died in Brooklyn on January 25, 1906, at the age of 69. He is one of the few former Confederate officers buried within Arlington National Cemetery.

== Legacy ==
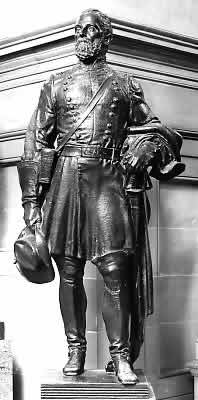
National Statuary Hall Collection statue of Wheeler

In 1925, the state of Alabama donated a bronze statue of Joseph Wheeler to the National Statuary Hall Collection at the United States Capitol. Additionally, several locations in Alabama are named after Wheeler, including Joe Wheeler State Park, Wheeler Lake and Dam, and the Wheeler National Wildlife Refuge. Also, Wheeler High School in Marietta, Georgia, and Wheeler County, Georgia are named after him. During World War II, the United States Navy named a Liberty Ship in honor of Wheeler. Wheeler Road, a main thoroughfare through west Augusta is named after him as well. Furthermore, Joe Wheeler Electric Cooperative in northwest Alabama also honors him. Also Camp Wheeler, near Macon, Georgia (which served as an army base during both World Wars), was named for Wheeler.

The City of Derby, Connecticut, where Wheeler grew up, named him as one of the first members of its Hall of Fame in 2007.

Wheeler was portrayed by Gary Busey in the 1997 TV movie Rough Riders.

== See also ==
- List of American Civil War generals (Confederate)
- Slavery and State's Rights (speech by Wheeler in 1894)

== Notes ==
U.S. House of Representatives
Preceded by William M. Lowe	Member of the U.S. House of Representatives from Alabama's 8th congressional district March 4, 1881 – June 3, 1882	Succeeded by William M. Lowe
Preceded by William M. Lowe	Member of the U.S. House of Representatives from Alabama's 8th congressional district January 15, 1883 – March 3, 1883	Succeeded by Luke Pryor
Preceded by Luke Pryor	Member of the U.S. House of Representatives from Alabama's 8th congressional district March 4, 1885 – April 20, 1900	Succeeded by William Richardson
