= Wheeler, Alabama =

Unincorporated community in Alabama, United States

- Unincorporated community
- Location within Alabama Location within the United States
- Coordinates: 34°39′9.3″N 87°14′59″W
- Country: United States
- State: Alabama
- County: Lawrence
- Elevation: 597 ft (182 m)
- Time zone: UTC-6 (Central (CST))
  - Summer (DST): UTC-5 (CDT)
- Area code: 256

Wheeler (also known as Wheeler Station) is an unincorporated community in Lawrence County, Alabama, United States. Wheeler had a post office at one time, but it no longer exists. Wheeler has two sites on the National Register of Historic Places, the Tidewater-type cottage known as Bride's Hill and the former home of Joseph Wheeler, Pond Spring.

== Demographics ==
Historical population
Census	Pop.	Note	%±
1880	114		—
U.S. Decennial Census

Wheeler Station appeared on the 1880 U.S. Census as an unincorporated community of 114 residents. This was the only time it appeared on census records.

== Geography ==
Wheeler is located in the Tennessee River valley, roughly 5 miles (8.0 km) south of Wheeler Lake. It is at 34.65259°N 87.24974°W and has an elevation of 597 feet (182 m).
