= Alabama Tribune =

The Alabama Tribune was a newspaper published in Montgomery, Alabama in the US. According to the Library of Congress' website it was established in the 1930s and ceased publication in the 1960s. Newspapers.com has archives of the paper from 1946 to 1964.

The paper had a tagline of "Clean - Constructive - Conservative", and promoted itself with the line "Covers Alabama Like the Dew".

It reported on a legal case challenging racial segregation at the University of Alabama. It reported on Montgomery bus boycott activities, the NAACP being ruled "foreign", and on Martin Luther King Jr.'s organizing. On October 31, 1958 the paper reported on Martin Luther King Jr.'s return to Montgomery. Editor Jackson wrote about wanting "first come, first served" treatment on buses.

Jackson was an organizer of what became The Committee for Equal Justice. In 1938, Earnest W. Taggart wrote to him suggesting the Montgomery NAACP branch be revived. In 1944, following the rape of Recy Taylor, Jackson worked with Eugene Gordon of the Daily Worker to organize a meeting with governor Chauncey Sparks, who committed to hold an investigation.

The Montgomery Enterprise and Montgomery-Tuskegee Times were other newspapers for African Americans in Montgomery.

== See also ==
- List of African American newspapers in Alabama
