= List of African American newspapers in Alabama =

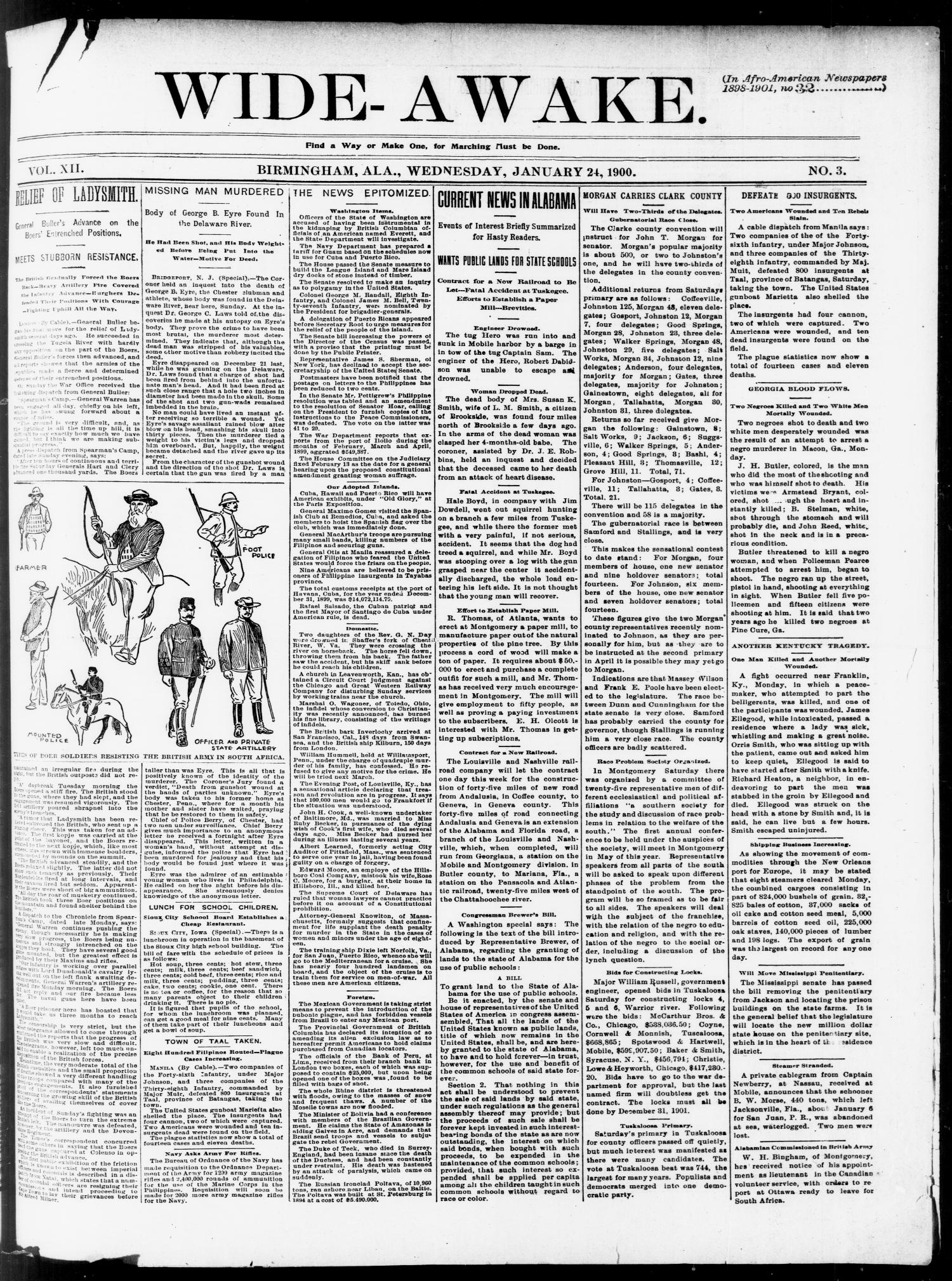
Front page of the Birmingham Wide-Awake from January 1900.

This is a list of African American newspapers that have been published in Alabama. It includes both current and historical newspapers.

The first such newspaper in Alabama was The Nationalist, published in Mobile from 1865 to 1869. Many more followed it, with some 100 newspapers established in the 1890s alone as the reading population grew and became more urbanized.

Alabama's first state organization of African American newspapers was the Alabama Colored Press Association. Founded by the editors of nine papers in 1887, the association ceased to function after two years after many of its key members were driven out of the state by racist violence. Growth of African American publications continued in the state, and the Afro-American Press Association of Alabama was established in 1894.

== Newspapers ==
City	Title	Beginning	End	Frequency	Call numbers	Remarks
Aldrich	The Alabama Time-Piece; The Alabama Timepiece	1895	1902?	Weekly	LCCN sn85044527; OCLC 11359168	Published by Aldrich Publishing Company.; Edited by B.L. Lester.
Anniston / Birmingham (1909–1911)	The Baptist Leader	1880s	1900s	Weekly	LCCN sn85044572; OCLC 12056704	Edited by Jesse C. Duke.
Anniston	The Union Leader	1901	1903?	Weekly	LCCN sn85044820; OCLC 12368721	
Bay Minette	American Banner	1895?	?	Weekly, bimonthly in 1899	LCCN sn85044611; OCLC 12085208	Published by Boykin, S.J.; Attested through at least 1902.
Belmont	News	1902	1903	Weekly		
Bethel	The Southern Star	1890s	1900s	Weekly	LCCN sn87050284; OCLC 16505917	
Birmingham / Montgomery (1877–1882)	Advance	1876	1882	Weekly		First Democratic African American newspaper in Alabama.; Edited by James A. Scott.
Birmingham	The Afro-American Labor Sentinel	1896	?	Twice monthly		Published by The Afro-American Labor and Protective Association.
Birmingham	The Birmingham American	1910s	1900s	Weekly	LCCN sn87050405; OCLC 17279686	
Birmingham	Birmingham Blade; The Birmingham Blade	1907	1909	Weekly	LCCN sn86050141; OCLC 13355701	Published and edited by L.H. Harrison.
Birmingham	Broad Axe	1891	1895			Edited by T.H. Jordan.
Birmingham	By Any Means Necessary: (BAMN)	1985?	?	Irregular	OCLC 27921519	Published by New Afrikan People’s Organization. Edited by Thandisizwe Chimurenga.; Attested through at least 1993.
Birmingham	Christian Era; Birmingham Era	1886	1887			Edited by T.W. Coffee.
Birmingham / Demopolis	The Christian Hope	1894?	?	Weekly		Edited by L.S. Steinbeck.; Attested through at least 1902.
Birmingham	Birmingham Free Speech	1901	?	Weekly	LCCN sn86050142; OCLC 13355683	Published by Francis P. McAlpin.
Birmingham	Hot Shots	1896	1900s	Irregular	LCCN sn86050334; OCLC 13944291	
Birmingham	Birmingham Mirror; The Birmingham Mirror	1939?	?	Weekly	LCCN sn89050010; OCLC 19255850	Published by J. Howard Williamson.; Attested through at least 1974.
Birmingham	Negro American; The Negro American; American Citizen (1888–)	1886	1891?	Weekly	LCCN sn87050415; OCLC 17293242	Edited by R.C.O. Benjamin from 1886 to 1887, when threats of white violence forced him to leave. Subsequent editors included J.W. White, Albert Boyd, and A.N. Jackson.; "The most outspoken black paper in Birmingham".
Birmingham	The New Era Banner	1918 or 1919	?	Weekly	LCCN sn87050161; OCLC 15725330	
Birmingham	The Pleiades	1888	?	Weekly	LCCN sn87050416; OCLC 17293270	
Birmingham	The Birmingham Reporter	1900?	?	Weekly	LCCN sn88050035; OCLC 17545418	Published by the Colored Masonic Temple.; Attested through at least 1928.; Edited by Oscar W. Adams Sr. from 1907 to 1928.
Birmingham	The Birmingham Reporter; Birmingham Eagle Reporter	1915?	1930s	Weekly	LCCN sn87050145; OCLC 12061365	"Official organ of the Masons, Eastern Stars, and Knights of Pythias of Alabama and Knights and Ladies of Honor of the World."
Birmingham	The Times Plain Dealer	1910s	1900s	Weekly	LCCN sn87050142; OCLC 15615311	Attested through at least 1921.
Birmingham	The Birmingham Times	1964	current	Weekly	LCCN sn85044582; OCLC 11125591; ISSN 1534-2794	Official site
Birmingham	The Birmingham Truth	1902	1900s	Weekly	LCCN sn85044585; OCLC 9514196	Attested through at least 1927.; Founded and until 1910 edited by Carrie A. Tuggle.
Birmingham	The Truth	1903	1900s	Weekly	LCCN sn87050092; OCLC 15376366	Attested through at least 1905.; Published by Tuggle Printing Company.
Birmingham	The Voice of the People; Weekly Voice (1916–1917)	1913?	1920s	Weekly	LCCN sn88050055; OCLC 17672113	Published by E.W. Howell.
Birmingham	The Alabama Voice	1946	?	Bimonthly newspaper		Published by H.D. Coke.
Birmingham	Weekly Pilot	1883	?	Weekly	LCCN sn88050012; OCLC 17407826	Edited by J.H. Thomason. Published by Pilot Publishing Company.
Birmingham	The Weekly Review	1934?	?	Weekly	LCCN sn85044586f; OCLC 9509110	Published and edited by Robert Durr.
Birmingham	Wide Awake Bulletin (1880s–1890s); Wide-Awake (1890s–); Birmingham Wide-Awake (1906–)	1887 or 1889?	1890s	Weekly	Wide-Awake Bulletin: LCCN sn88050018; OCLC 17408400; Wide-Awake: LCCN sn83025484, 2013254374; OCLC 850967976, 2775228, 9526349; Birmingham Wide-Awake: LCCN sn87050155; OCLC 15720225	
Birmingham	The Workmen's Chronicle; The Workmens Chronicle	1917	?	Weekly	LCCN sn88050014; OCLC 17407907	"Issued under the auspices of the Afro-American Sociological Congress."
Birmingham	Birmingham World	1930	1996	Weekly, twice weekly from 1940 to 1969	LCCN sn83045136; OCLC 18729791, 2258369, 3449376	Founded by W.A. Scott. Published by Joe N. Dickson & Associates.
Decatur	The Guardian	1910	1900s	Monthly newspaper	LCCN sn88050094; OCLC 17857604	Attested through at least 1914.
Decatur	Speakin' Out Weekly News; Speakin’ Out News	1980	current	Weekly	LCCN sn88050097, sn90099002; OCLC 21026715, 17857788	Official site; Published by William Smothers.
Dothan	Southern Star	1916	?	Weekly	LCCN sn86050439; OCLC 14866951	Published by M.S. Brown. Edited by M.J. Adams from 1918 to 1919.
Dothan	The Voice Of The Negro; Voice of the Negro	1912?	?	Weekly	LCCN sn86050440; OCLC 14867035	Attested through at least 1915.
Epes	The Sumter Enterprise	1907	?	Weekly	LCCN sn8850071; OCLC 17698936	Published and edited by A.G. Idrell.
Eufaula	Vindicator	1889	?			Edited by T.W. Coffee.
Eutaw	Greene County Democrat	?	current	Weekly	LCCN sn85044807; OCLC 9238773; ISSN 0889-518X	Official site
Eutaw	Western Guide	1905	1909	Weekly		
Fayette	Watchman	1902	1903	Weekly		
Florence	The Shoals News Leader	1979?	?	Weekly		Published by Reginald Liner.
Florence	The Watcher	1888	1800s	Weekly	LCCN sn87050259; OCLC 9191005	Suspended publication in 1889.
Fort McClellan	The Buffalo	1942	1945	Weekly	LCCN sn95060758; OCLC 35083693	Published by the 92nd Infantry Division of the United States Army.; Later published from Fort Huachuca, Arizona and Northern Italy.; Available online
Georgiana	The Temple Star	1916?	?	Twice monthly		
Girard	Eastern Sunlight	1901	1914	Weekly		
Grove Hill	Grove Hill Herald	1800s	1850s	Weekly	LCCN sn85044896; OCLC 12442012; ISSN 2574-7428	
Hayneville / Montgomery	The Republican Sentinel and Hayneville Times	1878	1878	Weekly	LCCN sn85044770; OCLC 12170385	Published by James T. Rapier. Edited by Nathan M. Alexander.
Huntsville	Huntsville Gazette	1879	1894	Weekly	LCCN 760643891, sn84020151, sn90023104; OCLC 18762026, 2710177; ISSN 2575-1271	Edited by Charles Hendley, Jr.; "[T]he most financially successful and enduring black newspaper in Alabama before 1900."
Huntsville	The Herald	1878	1884	Weekly	LCCN sn85044762; OCLC 12170269	Edited by W.H. Councill.
Huntsville	The Huntsville Journal	1895	1897	Weekly	LCCN sn86050127; OCLC 13364689	
Huntsville	The Journal	1897	1912	Weekly	LCCN sn86050128; OCLC 13364698	Edited by H.C. Binford from 1897 to 1911, and then by J.A. Binford.
Huntsville	The Huntsville Mirror	1935?	?	Weekly	LCCN sn87050016; OCLC 15116289	Edited by L.C. Jamar.
Huntsville	The Huntsville Star	1900	?	Weekly	LCCN 2012254019, sn83025483; OCLC 2747386, 773146372, 9525997	Edited by Richard C. Hancock.
Huntsville	The Weekly News	1968	1980s	Weekly or bimonthly	LCCN sn87050012; OCLC 15115941	
Huntsville	The Weekly News	1900s	1900s	Weekly	LCCN sn88050153; OCLC 18395742	Attested from at least 1931.
Kempsville	The Eagle; The Cagie	1800s	1910s	Twice monthly	LCCN sn87050157, sn87050156; OCLC 15724910, 15724980	
Lovan	The Eagle	1880s	1900s	Twice monthly	LCCN sn87050186; OCLC 15986125	
Marion	The Journal Reporter	1870s	?	Weekly	LCCN sn88050195; OCLC 18545605	Attested through at least 1881.
Mobile	Ace	1975	?	Weekly	OCLC 17270714	Edited by William Shirley and Arthur Johnson Jr.; Attested through at least 1979.
Mobile	Mobile Beacon; The Mobile Beacon & Alabama Citizen; The Mobile Beacon and Alabama Citizen	1943	current	Weekly	LCCN 760643870, 84020221, 88050211, sn84020221, sn88050212; OCLC 18659049, 2264283, 2666053	Published by Lancie M. Thomas.; Conflicting reports of closure in 2019.
Mobile	Gazette	1883	1884	Twice weekly, then weekly (1882–1884)		Final journalistic venture of Philip Joseph.
Mobile	Herald	1871	1872			"[E]stablished in August 1871 to defend the Turner-Spencer faction of the party from attacks by the Mobile Republican."
Mobile	Methodist Vindicator	1888	1889			Edited by T.W. Coffee.
Mobile	The Nationalist	1865	1869	Triweekly	LCCN sn84023844; OCLC 11037661	First African American newspaper in Alabama.; Owned and managed by African Americans. Edited in 1865 by John Silsby, and from 1866 to 1869 by Albert Griffin, "two white carpetbaggers".
Mobile	The New Times	1981	current	Weekly	LCCN sn85044906; OCLC 10487314; ISSN 0885-1662	
Mobile	The Press Forum Sun	1900s	1900s	Weekly	LCCN sn88050206; OCLC 18657644	
Mobile	The Press-Forum Weekly	1929	1941	Weekly	LCCN sn88050205; OCLC 18657633	
Mobile	The Mobile Republican	1870	1872?	Weekly; daily in 1870	LCCN 760643865, sn87062006; OCLC 2674435	Initially a daily, purchased and turned into a weekly by Philip Joseph later in 1870. James Shaw became editor and publisher in 1871.; "[P]ossibly the first in the state to be edited by an Afro-American."
Mobile	The Southern Watchman	1899	1904	Weekly	LCCN sn88050167; OCLC 18517103	Edited by Anderson N. McEwen.
Mobile	The Mobile Watchman; Watchman	1873	1874	Weekly	LCCN sn88050159, sn88050160; OCLC 9200254, 9200310	Edited by Philip Joseph and K. H. Saltiel.
Mobile	The Mobile Weekly Advocate	1911	?	Weekly	LCCN sn88050162; OCLC 18516318	Attested through at least 1958.
Mobile	The Mobile Weekly Press	1896?	1929	Weekly	LCCN sn88050185; OCLC 18530886	Edited by Andrew N. Johnson from 1894 to 1907.
Montgomery	The Advance	1877?	1880s	Weekly	LCCN sn87050046; OCLC 15220741	Published by James A. Scott.
Montgomery	The Alabama Enterprise	1885?	?	Weekly	LCCN sn85045115; OCLC 12905754	Attested from 1886.; Edited by Sam B. Davis.
Montgomery	The Alabama Guide	1884	?	Monthly newspaper		Published and edited by M.G. Thomas.
Montgomery	Alabama Republican	1880	?	Weekly	LCCN sn86050109; OCLC 13346900	Published and edited by Charles O. Harris.
Montgomery	Alabama Tribune	1951	1964?	Weekly	LCCN sn86050396; OCLC 14581814	Published by E.G. Jackson.
Montgomery	The Montgomery Argus	1890	?	Weekly	LCCN sn86050407; OCLC 14766859, 1476859	
Montgomery	The Colored Alabamian	1907	1916	Weekly	LCCN sn83045035; OCLC 9308701	
Montgomery	The Colored Citizen	1884	1884	Weekly	LCCN sn85045116; OCLC 12919260	Published by Brown Brothers.
Montgomery	The Emancipator	1917	1920s	Weekly	LCCN sn86050425; OCLC 11961865	Edited by J. Edward McCall.
Montgomery	The Montgomery Enterprise	1898	1900	Weekly	LCCN 2013254326, sn83025485; OCLC 2753672, 844394869, 9526435	
Montgomery	The Evening Appeal	1886?	?	Unknown		
Montgomery	The Evening Appeal	1880s	?	Daily	LCCN sn85045113; OCLC 12905423	Published by Allred Bros.
Montgomery	The Helping Hand	1907?	1910s	Weekly	LCCN sn86050428; OCLC 14817352	Published by Jackson A. Stokes.; Attested through at least 1912.
Montgomery	The Herald	1886	1887	Weekly	LCCN sn85045117; OCLC 12919382	Published by Jesse C. Duke, who was driven from the state by a lynch mob after writing an anti-lynching editorial in The Herald in 1887.
Montgomery	The Montgomery Mirror	1935?	?	Weekly		
Montgomery	Montgomery-Tuskegee Times: The Alternative; Montgomery-Tuskegee Times	1979	2000s	Weekly	LCCN sn85044592; OCLC 11817447	Published and edited by Rev. Al Dixon
Montgomery	The Odd Fellows Journal	1885	?	Monthly newspaper	LCCN sn93065629; OCLC 28004324	Attested through at least October 1886.
Montgomery	The Republican Sentinel	1872?	?	Weekly	LCCN sn8650433; OCLC 14866378	Owned and edited by James T. Rapier.
Montgomery	The Southern Courier	1965	1968	Weekly	LCCN sn84025852; OCLC 10462102, 7852098	Moved from Atlanta to Montgomery in September 1965.
Montgomery	The Montgomery Times	1977	1979	Weekly	LCCN sn86050432; OCLC 13460131	
Montgomery	Voice of Action	1970	?	Weekly		
Montgomery	Watchman; Negro Watchman (1874)	1873	1874			Edited by Philip Joseph, with William H. Councill and A.E. Williams as associate editors.
Montgomery	The Weekly Citizen	1884	?	Weekly	LCCN sn86050448; OCLC 14875394	Numerous editors and publishers.
Montgomery	The Weekly News	1884	?	Weekly	LCCN sn86050419; OCLC 14769112	Published by C.M. Brown, noted for his advocacy of black self-defense.
Montgomery	Montgomery Weekly Review	1936?	?	Weekly		Edited by William P. Smith.
Opelika	The People's Choice	1894	?	Weekly	LCCN sn85045044; OCLC 12739206	Edited by John P. Lawrence.; Circulation of 300.
Patton Junction	The Patton Pointer	1897 or 1898	1904	Weekly	LCCN sn87050225; OCLC 16096129	Edited by J.T. Nall.
Selma	The Baptist Pioneer	1878 or 1879?	1886	Weekly or monthly	LCCN sn85044666; OCLC 12152825	Published by the Alabama Baptist Normal and Theological School.; Edited by W.H. McAlpine.
Selma	The Selma Cyclone	1886	1890s	Weekly	LCCN sn85044523; OCLC 11198071	Edited by William J. Stevens from 1886 to 1887 and by John Mitchell Gee from 1887 to 1890.; Known for its conciliatory political stance.
Selma	Dallas Post	1884	1884			Edited by W.H. Mixon.; "[T]he first secular Negro news journal ever published in Dallas County."
Selma	The Independent; Southern Independent	1800s	?	Weekly	LCCN sn85044581; OCLC 11200309	Edited by Mansfield Bryant from 1886 to 1889.; Absorbed Selma Social Circle and Gospel Messenger in 1888.
Selma	Selma Record	1900	?	Weekly	LCCN sn86050246; OCLC 13743949	Attested through at least 1902.
Selma	Selma Sentinel	1965	?	Weekly	LCCN sn85044634, sn85044636; OCLC 12119757, 12123801	
Selma	Southern Christian Age	1898	?	Weekly		Edited by W.H. Mixon.; Attested through at least 1901.
Selma	Southern Christian Recorder	1888	1891			Newspaper of the African Methodist Episcopal Church. Edited by Mansfield Bryant.; Moved to Nashville, Tennessee in 1891 after Bryant was arrested for his outspoken writing and his life was threatened by a lynch mob.
Slocomb	Ardis Times	1909	1911	Weekly		
Talladega	Reporter and Watchtower	1873	1886?	Weekly	LCCN sn84023594; OCLC 10896961	Published by T.J. Cross and M.H. Cruikshank.
Talladega	The Southern Sentinel	1877	1881? or 1886	Monthly during school year	LCCN sn88050143; OCLC 18370187	Edited by Edward P. Lord from 1877 to 1879, and George N. Ellis from 1879 to 1881.
Tunnell Springs	Eagle	1888	1913			
Tuscaloosa	Alabama Citizen; The Alabama Citizen and the Tuscaloosa Weekly Review	1944? or 1947	1947 or 1963	Weekly	LCCN sn88050211; OCLC 18658854, 18658986	Published by James R. Greene.; Published in Mobile from October 1961 to September 1963.
Tuscaloosa	Tuscaloosa Courier	1979?	?	Monthly newspaper	OCLC 26923020	Published by Charles Steele Jr.
Tuscaloosa	Tuskaloosa Chronicle	1896	?	Weekly	LCCN sn88050106; OCLC 17869150	
Tuscumbia	The American Star	1901	1929?	Monthly	LCCN sn85045004; OCLC 12689668	"[T]he leading black paper in northwest Alabama."; Edited by G.W. Trenholm.
Tuskegee	The Alabama Headlight	1900	1902?	Semimonthly		Published by Alabama Headlight.
Tuskegee	The Tuskegee Herald	1950	1958	Monthly newspaper	LCCN sn86050103; OCLC 13291570	Published by Hal Fisher. Edited by Mrs. E.M. Washington.
Tuskegee	The Messenger	1905	1900s	Weekly	LCCN sn92063894; OCLC 26654014	
Tuskegee	The Negro Farmer	1940	?	Monthly newspaper	LCCN 2004225260; OCLC 55899359	
Tuskegee	The Tuskegee Progressive Times	1970?	1971	Weekly	LCCN sn86050100; OCLC 13290841	Published by Joseph Ervin Morse.
Tuskegee	The Tuskegee Times	1974	1976	Weekly	LCCN sn86050101; OCLC 13290880	
Tuskegee	The Tuskegee Voice	1976	1977	Weekly	LCCN sn86050099; OCLC 13290757	Published by J. Lowell Ware and edited by Rick Dunn.
Tuskegee	The Zion Church Worker: The Home Newspaper	1900	?	Monthly newspaper		
Union Springs	The Union Springs Enterprise	1895	?	Weekly	LCCN sn85044566; OCLC 12049726	Edited by B.F. Rollins, then by R.T. Timothy in September–October 1896.
Uniontown	The Negro Leader; The Uniontown News	1900	1917	Weekly	LCCN 87050364, sn87050363, sn87050364; OCLC 17003390, 17003504	Official organ of the Black Belt Farmers Conference.
Wetumpka	Observer	1910	1912	Weekly		
Yantley	Racial Endeavors	1906	1907	Weekly		

== See also ==
- List of African American newspapers and media outlets
- List of African American newspapers in Florida
- List of African American newspapers in Georgia
- List of African American newspapers in Mississippi
- List of African American newspapers in Tennessee
- List of newspapers in Alabama

== Works cited ==
- Danky, James Philip; Hady, Maureen E., eds. (1998). African-American newspapers and periodicals : a national bibliography. Harvard University Press. ISBN 9780674007888.
- Jones, Allen Woodrow (1983). "Alabama". In Suggs, Henry Lewis (ed.). The Black Press in the South, 1865–1979. ISBN 9780313222443.
- Pride, Armistead Scott; Wilson, Clint C. (1997). A History of the Black Press. Howard University Press. ISBN 9780882581927.
- Smith, Jessie Carney (2012). Black Firsts: 4,000 Ground-Breaking and Pioneering Historical Events. Visible Ink Press. ISBN 9781578593699.
