= Philip Joseph (politician) =

American politician

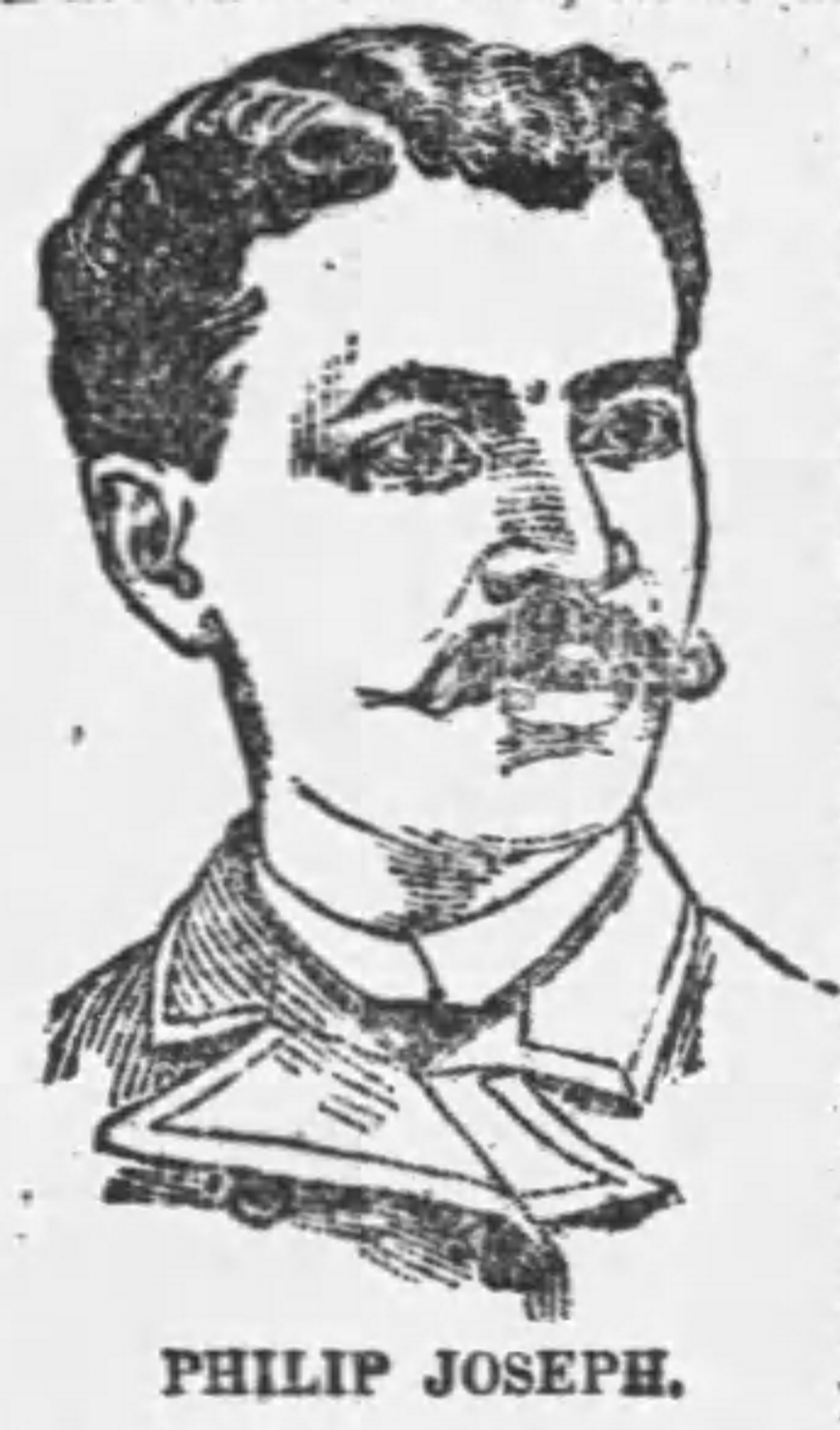
Joseph in 1888

Philip Joseph was a politician and journalist in Reconstruction and Jim Crow-era Alabama. An African American, he was a Republican.

== Early life ==
Joseph was born free in about 1846 in Florida and traced his ancestry to Spain, France, Africa, and Cuba. His mother was the daughter of a wealthy Cuban and she liberated the family's nine hundred slaves. Joseph was well educated and was fluent in three languages, French, German, and English.

== Reconstruction politics ==
During reconstruction (1865-1877), Joseph was the president of the Mobile branch of the Union League and involved in civil rights. In late 1869, Joseph boarded a whites-only car of Mobile's Washington Avenue Railroad. He was forcibly ejected and brought a case against the conductor, John Bailey, for assault. The judge in the case, Cleveland F. Moulton, noted that the right of a railroad to have segregated cars was recognized by common law in England and the US, and that Joseph was only possibly the victim of assault on the basis of how he was ejected from the car, as the rightness of his ejection was not in question. The jury found Bailey guilty, and assigned him a fine of one cent.

Joseph served as a delegate to the Republican National Convention in 1868 and 1872. In early 1872, he served as a postal clerk in Mobile and as a clerk in the Mobile custom house.

In 1870 he began his journalism career founding the Mobile Republican. He eventually founded and edited four newspapers in Mobile and Montgomery from 1870 until 1884

In 1872 he decided to oppose the reelection of Benjamin S. Turner to the United States House of Representatives. This split the Republican vote, and allowed the Liberal Republican and Democratic Party fusion candidate Frederick G. Bromberg to win the election. During the campaign, Turner accused Joseph of having been a "secret agent of the rebel government" during the Civil War.

Joseph remained involved in politics and was a clerk of the Alabama state legislature from 1872 to 1874. He also continued working as a journalist and founded the Montgomery Watchman in February 1873, and edited the weekly for the following year. He frequently wrote in favor of the proposed Civil Rights Act, which became law in 1875. In 1874 he ran unsuccessfully for a seat in the Alabama legislature and was a leading figure at the black convention in Montgomery. In 1875 he testified before the US Congress about efforts to break up black Republican political meetings in Alabama. Later that year he was sued for libel and ordered to pay the plaintiff $10,000 in damages. After this he left Mobile and moved to Delta, Louisiana in Madison Parish where he was appointed supervisor of registration and began editing the Madison Journal.

== Post-Reconstruction politics ==
By 1880 he had returned to Mobile and was editing the Mobile Gazette. By that time the Republican Party had diminished greatly in Alabama, and the Gazette was called the only Republican paper in the state. In lieu of the absent Republican tickets, Joseph and the paper endorsed the Greenback Party ticket.

In March 1880, Joseph spoke before Congress at the Exodus Investigation, testifying that blacks in Alabama were kept from the polls and were violently prevented from leaving the state. He was aggressively cross-examined by Zebulon Baird Vance, who questioned why blacks should be allowed to vote if they were intimidated away from the polls in spite of outnumbering whites in some areas by a count of eight to one. In 1881, he was appointed postmaster of Mobile by president James A. Garfield just before Garfield was shot by an assassin on July 2. Garfield survived in intensive care for 11 weeks, and on account of the political turmoil, Joseph's commission was never confirmed.

When African-American Republican politician, Jack Turner (politician), was lynched in 1882 in Choctaw County, Alabama, Joseph was outspoken in his outrage, frequently writing about the case in the Gazette.

In 1883, Congressman Thomas H. Herndon died and Joseph was nominated by the Republican Party to replace him. James Taylor Jones was nominated by the Democrats and Jones won by a landslide in the July election, with Joseph receiving no votes in two of the counties which were part of the district.

In late September, 1884, he was appointed collector of internal revenue of the Mobile District, to replace A. L. Morgan. However, the appointment was revoked before the month was out.

Also in 1884 he was in charge of the Alabama African-American exhibit at the New Orleans World's Cotton Centennial Exposition, a world's fair. In 1888 he was director general of the National Colored Exposition at Atlanta.

In 1903 Joseph was convicted for assault and attempted murder when he shot a woman. He was pardoned by Governor William D. Jelks, reportedly because when committing the crime Joseph was under the influence of morphine and did not know what he was doing.
