= John Carraway =

American politician

John Carraway (c. 1834 - 1871) was a tailor, seaman, civil rights activist, and politician in the United States. In Alabama during the Reconstruction era, he served as a delegate to the 1867 Alabama Constitutional Convention. He also served on Mobile, Alabama's city council, and in the Alabama House of Representatives.

Carraway was born around 1834 the son of a plantation owner in North Carolina and one of his slaves. He was emancipated in his father's will. He left Mobile for Brooklyn, New York in the 1850s. While in Brooklyn, he campaigned in New York for voting rights for African Americans.

He served in the Union Army as part of the 54th Massachusetts Infantry Regiment under Robert Gould Shaw during the American Civil War. In the Alabama House he was a political ally but personal rival of Creole legislator Ovid Gregory.

Carraway represented Mobile at the state's 1867 Constitutional Convention, served in the Alabama House of Representatives from 1868 to 1870, and served on the Mobile City Council in 1869 and 1870. At the convention he spoke in opposition to segregation and opposed a ban on marriages between blacks and whites. He also proposed life imprisonment for any white men cohabiting with black women.

He was a rival of Lawrence S. Berry. Jeremiah Haralson accused him of taking a bribe from railroad interests.

== See also ==
- Mobile Nationalist
- African American officeholders from the end of the Civil War until before 1900
