= Ovide =

Ovide may refer to:

- Ovide, a brand name for the insecticide malathion
- Ovide, a character in the animated television show Ovide and the Gang
- Ovide Plouffe, a character in The Crime of Ovide Plouffe
- Ovide River, Quebec, Canada

== People ==
- François Ovide, French guitarist
- Simone Ovide, birth name of Simone Duvalier, wife of Haitian president François Duvalier
- Ovide Alakannuark, Canadian politician
- Ovide Charlebois, Canadian Roman Catholic bishop
- Ovide Decroly, Belgian teacher and psychologist
- Ovide Doiron, Canadian racing driver
- Ovide Gregory, American politician
- Ovide Laflamme, Canadian politician
- Ovide Lamontagne, American lawyer and politician
- Ovide Le Blanc, Canadian politician
- Ovide Mercredi, Canadian politician
- Ovide de Montigny, French-Canadian fur trapper
- Ovide Musin, Belgian violinist and composer
- Ovide F. Pomerleau, American psychologist
- Charles-Ovide Perrault, Lower Canadian lawyer and politician
- François-Xavier-Ovide Méthot, Quebec farmer and politician
- Joseph-Ovide Turgeon, Canadian politician
- Louis-Ovide Brunet, French-Canadian botanist and Roman Catholic priest

== See also ==
- Ovid
