= Richard Waring =

American actor

- Born: Richard Waring Stephens; 27 May 1911; Chalfont St Peter, Buckinghamshire, England
- Died: 18 January 1993 (aged 81); City Island, Bronx, New York, U.S.
- Resting place: Crownhill Crematorium & Cemetery
- Occupation: Actor
- Years active: 1930–1968
- Spouse: Florida Friebus (m. 1934; div. 1952)
- Children: 1

Richard Waring (born Richard Waring Stephens; 27 May 1911 – 18 January 1993) was an American actor. He is perhaps best remembered for his role in the film Mr. Skeffington (1944).

== Biography ==
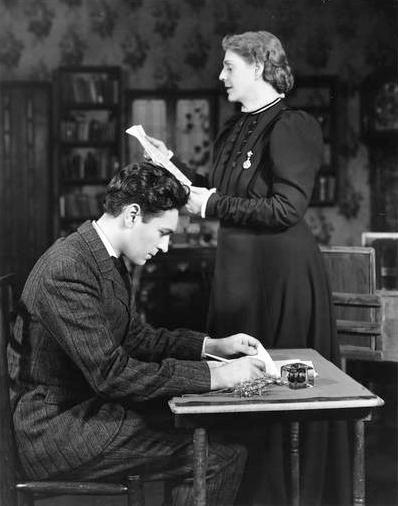
Richard Waring and Ethel Barrymore in the Broadway production of The Corn Is Green (1940)

Richard Waring was born Richard Stephens in Chalfont St Peter, Buckinghamshire in 1911, the son of Thomas E. Stephens, a painter, whose portrait of U.S. President Dwight D. Eisenhower hangs in the Smithsonian Gallery of Presidents. He later adopted Waring, his mother's (Evelyn M. Stephens) maiden name, as his stage name. Waring was the brother of Peter John Stephens, a playwright and author.

Waring began his career in 1931 with Eva Le Gallienne's Civic Repertory Theater in New York City in Romeo and Juliet,

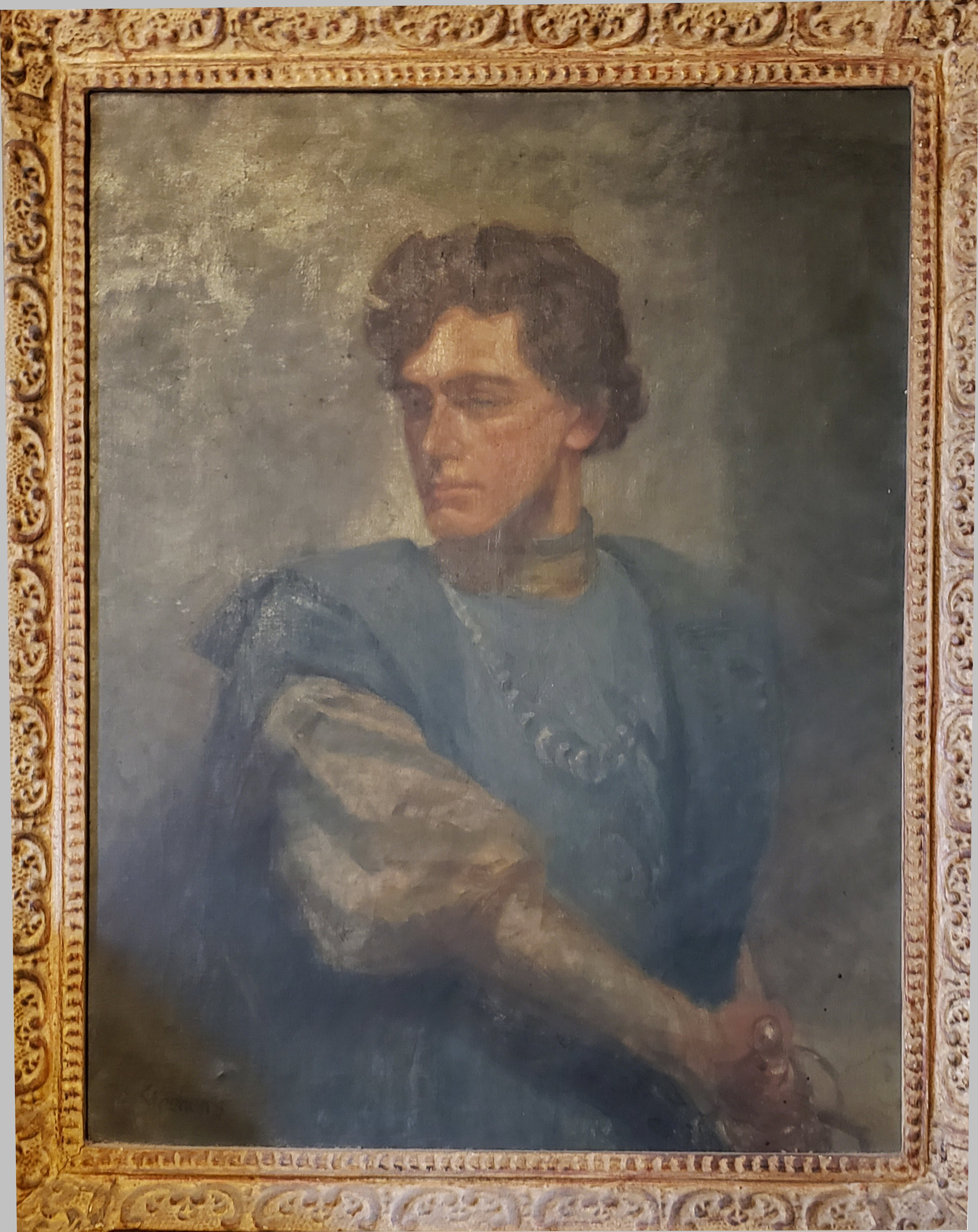
Richard Waring in his early role as Romeo painted by his father Thomas E. Stephens

Camille, and Cradle Song. In 1940, he played opposite Ethel Barrymore in The Corn Is Green and later with Le Gallienne and was signed to play the role in Hollywood opposite Bette Davis, but entered the army during World War II. Before that, he was filmed in his best-known screen role in Mr. Skeffington (1944) as Fanny Trellis' brother Trippy.

After his war service he appeared on Broadway as the Duke of Buckingham in Henry VIII, John Shand in J.M. Barrie's What Every Woman Knows and as the Captain in George Bernard Shaw's Androcles and the Lion. He also appeared in many performances of the American Shakespeare Festival directed by John Houseman and at the Phoenix Theatre in New York City, playing both bit roles and major parts in many of Shakespeare's plays. He acted with Katharine Hepburn in The Merchant of Venice, Much Ado About Nothing, and one performance in A Midsummer Night's Dream as Oberon before she had to leave the production.

== Personal life ==
Waring became a naturalized United States citizen in 1937, adopting the legal name, Richard Waring.

== Death ==
Waring died of a heart attack on 18 January 1993 in City Island, Bronx, New York.

== Broadway theatre credits ==
- Dear Jane (1932)
- L'Aiglon (1934)
- The Women Have Their Way (1935)
- Camille (1935)
- The Corn Is Green (1940)
- At the Stroke of Eight (1940)
- The Man Who Killed Lincoln (1940; revived the character of John Wilkes Booth in Edwin Booth in 1958)
- Alice in Wonderland (1947)
- A Pound on Demand (1947)
- Androcles and the Lion (1947)
- What Every Woman Knows (1947)
- King Henry VIII (1947)
- Gramercy Ghost (1951)
- Portrait of a Queen (1968)

== Radio credits ==
- Elizabeth the Queen (1952)
- Second Husband (in the role of Grant Cummings)
- Brothers in Law (1970) (in the role of Henry Blagrove)

== Television credits ==
- Studio One
- Wuthering Heights (1948)
- Hallmark Hall of Fame: MacDuff in Macbeth (1954) with Maurice Evans and Judith Anderson
- Kiss Me Again, Stranger (1953)
- Alfred Hitchcock Presents (1958) (Season 3 Episode 31: "Festive Season") as Charlie Boerum
- Hallmark Hall of Fame: Bertrand in Eagle in a Cage with Trevor Howard as Napoleon (1965)

== Hollywood credits ==
Year	Title	Role	Notes
1935	The Perfect Gentleman	John Chatteris	
1944	Mr. Skeffington	Trippy Trellis	

== Records ==
- Scenes from Romeo and Juliet with Eva Le Gallienne (Atlantic Records, 1951; two-record set)
- Poems of Rupert Brooke (Folkways Records, Smithsonian Collection)
