= Rape of Betty Jean Owens =

American rape survivor

Betty Jean Owens
- Born: Betty Jean Owens; 1940 (age 85–86)

Betty Jean Owens (born 1940) is an African American woman who was gang raped by three white men and a 16-year-old white boy in Tallahassee, Florida in 1959. Her trial was significant in Florida, and the South as a whole, since the white men responsible were all found guilty and each received life sentences for their crimes. The Owens' case drew attention to sexual violence in the South by white men against black women and girls, crimes that often went with minimal or no punishment. For example, in the case of Recy Taylor, who was gang-raped by six white men in Alabama in 1944, the men were never found guilty of any charges and released from jail with minimal fines.

== Attack ==
On May 2, 1959, three white men, William Collinsworth, Patrick Scarborough, and David Beagles, along with Ollie Stoutamire, a 16-year-old white boy, set out together to find a woman to sexually assault. They approached a car at Jake Gaither Park armed with shotguns and switchblades. Patrick Scarborough pressed his shotgun against the African American driver's nose and ordered the occupants out of the car. Four African Americans stepped out of the car, two men and two women. All four people in the car were students at Florida A&M University (FAMU). Scarborough forced the two black men to kneel on the ground, and David Beagles held the two black women at knifepoint. Scarborough ordered the black men, Richard Brown and Thomas Butterfield, to leave and they slowly drove away.

The two black women left at the hands of the four white men were Edna Richardson and Betty Jean Owens. Edna Richardson broke free of the men and ran into a nearby park, leaving Betty Jean Owens alone with her attackers. Beagles promised to release her only if she did what they wanted her to do. They drove her to the edge of town and subsequently raped her seven times. Edna Richardson and the other two male students were able to make it back to their car and went to the local police station to report what had happened to them. The officer on duty that night was Joseph D. Cooke Jr., a 19-year-old intern. To the surprise of many people, he called for back up and searched for Owens. The officer spotted the car of the assailants and a chase ensued. Eventually, the group pulled their car over and the muffled screams of Owens could be heard from the car. She was bound and gagged on the backseat floorboard.

The four attackers were then arrested and taken to jail. They did not take their arrest seriously and joked with each other on the way to jail. All of them made written confessions to having abducted Owens at gunpoint and raping her. The youngest rapist Ollie Stoutamire was the nephew of the Tallahassee chief of police Frank Stoutamire, but Frank Stoutamire nonetheless decided to take the case.

Owens was impregnated by the rape. Officials helped make arrangements for her to get an abortion in New York.

== Reactions to the rape ==
After FAMU students learned of the attack on Owens, a small group planned an armed march to city hall. This armed march would symbolize their protection of black womanhood with guns as the whites protected white womanhood. Other student leaders argued against an armed march and instead planned a “Unity” demonstration. Fifteen hundred students entered the Lee Auditorium to demand justice for Owens, and the student leaders announced that they would petition the governor for a "speedy and impartial trial". The following day, over a thousand students gathered with signs and prayers that were broadcast over news media. Many of these students connected the events to other issues in the struggle for black freedom, such as the desegregation issues in Little Rock, Arkansas. These students held up posters with scenes from Little Rock that read, "My God How Much More of This Can We Take". Even the BBC broadcast segments of the FAMU student demonstrations. As a result of prominent media coverage, student protests, and a threat to boycott classes, Judge W. May Walker called together a grand jury into special session on May 6, 1959.

== Trial ==
More than 200 black spectators entered the courtroom that day to watch the trial. A nurse accompanied Owens because she was still undergoing treatment for injuries as well as depression. All four defendants pleaded not guilty, to the shock of the spectators in the courtroom. The four defendants were remanded to custody to await trial without bail.

Attitudes about the trial varied among black leaders. Ella Baker, the director the Southern Christian Leadership Conference, felt that the evidence in the case was so strong that the jury could not fail to convict. Elijah Muhammad, leader of the Nation of Islam, said that the four rapists destroyed the "virginity of our daughters". Furthermore, he explained that "Appeals for justice will avail us nothing... We know there is no justice under the American flag." The Pittsburgh Courier wrote that the trial would most likely end in acquittal, although the case was "as open and shut as a case can be." Following the indictment of the four attackers, Martin Luther King Jr., expressed praise for the FAMU student protesters. King explained that they gave "hope to all of us who struggle for human dignity and equal justice."

On June 12, 1959, Betty Jean Owens testified on her own behalf in front of 400 witnesses. She retold the events of the attack to the jury in detail. She told the jury, "I was so scared, but there was nothing I could do with four men, a knife, and a gun ... I couldn’t do anything but what they said.” The defense attorneys worked diligently to prove that Owens had consented to the attack and argued that if a rape did occur that she would have sustained more serious injuries. The doctors that treated Owens told the jury that her injuries resulted in a five-day hospital stay and that she was in a terrible condition. Owens testified that she was unable to use one leg and one arm for several days in the hospital. When the prosecution rested its case, the defense attorneys claimed that the state had failed to do anything but prove sexual intercourse had occurred and called for a judgment of acquittal. Judge Walker denied the motion and the defense was set to return the next day to present their case.

The defense claimed that the defendants were drunk and that their taped confessions were inadmissible. However, under cross-examination, David Beagles admitted that his confession was voluntary. The defense tried to present the men as reputable and incapable of committing such a heinous crime, and characterized Owens as a Jezebel, who therefore could not have been raped. When their attempts to discredit Owens failed, the defense then discussed the troubled backgrounds of the defendants. Scarborough's mother had been murdered when he was seven and his father had committed suicide the same year. Stoutamire, whose mother had died during childbirth, was mildly intellectually disabled, and the defense argued that he had an "evident mental incapacity and is therefore incapable of serious thought." Collingsworth was also intellectually disabled and illiterate.

In his final summation, State Attorney William D. Hopkins left the question of sentencing up to jury, but asked them to consider what would happen to four black men who kidnapped a white woman at gunpoint and raped her seven times. He said Owens was only alive since she had submitted to the demands of the defendants.

The jury read the verdict out loud: "guilty with a recommendation for mercy." Had the jury not recommended mercy, the defendants would've faced mandatory death sentences. Instead, they faced any term of years and a maximum of life in prison. Jury foreman A. H. King, a wealthy planter, said he and the other jurors did not believe the defendants were equally culpable and that there was a "great difference" between Scarborough and Stoutamire. As for why they had recommended mercy for all four defendants anyway, he said there was "no brutality involved" and claimed that the decision would have been the same "if the defendants had been four Negroes." The outcome sparked anger, with many local black people believing that at least two of the adult defendants should've been sentenced to death.

Judge Walker deferred sentencing for 15 days and sent the four defendants to the Florida State Prison, now the Union Correctional Institution. On June 15, 1959, Judge Walker sentenced all four of them to life in prison. He told the defendants that they had committed "an offense that is horrible and under horrible circumstances," and that they were "fortunate that the jury recommended mercy." Under Florida law, the defendants would become eligible for parole in six months, albeit the average time served was 10 years. After sentencing, Owens told reporters that she had initially been scared that the judge would be extremely lenient: "After the jury recommended mercy, I thought that one or two of them might have been turned loose and that the others would get short terms," she said. "And that was why I was afraid ... I felt they would come back and do something to me."

"I feel better now for the first time since it happened. For the first time, I feel safe."

== Later years ==
All of Owens's attackers were eventually paroled. Three of them would return to prison after committing additional crimes.

Ollie Stoutamire was paroled in 1965. According to a February 2011 newspaper article, he was still alive at the time and lived in Grand Ridge, Florida. A December 2012 obituary for a man named Roy Stoutamire who had been born in Tallahassee stated that Roy had a brother named Ollie who was still alive in December 2012. Ollie Stoutamire, who went on to work as a youth counselor in Marianna, Florida, is the only one of the four rapists to not commit any further crimes. After being paroled in 1967, Patrick Scarborough was in and out of prison until 1993, when he was arrested for attempted murder. In 1994, Scarborough was convicted of attempted second degree murder. He was sentenced to 12 years in prison and had his parole revoked. He died in prison on April 21, 2017, at the age of 78.

William Collinsworth was paroled in 1967. In 1975, he was re-arrested for violating his parole. He was released again the following year and never had any further legal troubles.

David Beagles was paroled in 1965. In 1969, he allegedly tracked down a black woman whom he thought was Owens, choked her, beat her with an electric insulator, shot her twice in the head with a .25 caliber pistol, and buried her in a shallow grave near an intersection. However, the victim was 30-year-old Betty Jean Robinson Houston, a different woman and the mother of two boys, ages 8 and 9. Beagles's red Mustang was found abandoned at the scene and the victim's fingerprints were found inside in his car. Beagles fled the county and was arrested in Marianna.

Beagles was charged with first degree murder. No fingerprints could be found on the weapon and no blood was found on Beagles or his car. It was confirmed that his wife owned a .25 caliber pistol, but the weapon was never found. However, Beagles's red Mustang was found abandoned at the scene and the victim's fingerprints were found inside in his car. At the trial, Ollie Stoutamire testified that while they were in prison together, Beagles had boasted to him that he planned to kill a black woman as revenge for his 1959 conviction and to show that he could kill a black person and get away with it. Beagles testified that he had accidentally hit Houston with his car at the intersection. Houston had jumped into his car, but fled the scene on foot after hearing police sirens, who were answering a call about a drunken Houston running in front of cars at the intersection. He fled to the home of Stoutamire's father George and persuaded him drive him to Marianna. In September 1969, Beagles was convicted of first degree murder and sentenced to life in prison after the jury recommended mercy. However, in 1974, his conviction was overturned on the grounds that the jurors were prejudiced after seeing photos of the crime scene. At his second trial in January 1974, Beagles was acquitted after a witness testified that he saw a blue car and a man other than Beagles at the scene of the murder. According to the prosecutor, he overheard that of the jurors thought Beagles had spent enough time in prison.

After his acquittal, Beagles had his parole revoked since he had admitted to fleeing from the scene, thus making him guilty of hit and run. However, he was paroled that June with the urging of Governor Reubin Askew after his wife appeared to seek executive clemency. Askew concluded that Beagles would be a "good candidate for parole since he had a wife who had "stuck by him." In January 1975, Beagles was arrested for kidnapping and raping a woman at knifepoint. He was acquitted later that year, but returned to prison after the Florida Parole Commission concluded that he had again violated the terms of his release.

In November 1976, an appellate court unanimously rejected an argument by Beagles that the parole commission had failed to give him due notice before revoking his parole. Beagles spent another 14 years in prison and was paroled in 1990. He died in 2016, at the age of 74.

In a 2011 interview, Owens said she never regretted testifying against the men and sending them to prison:

"It was never an option not to testify. It was my turn to speak up, and if I didn't, what would have happened?"

== See also ==
- 1995 Okinawa rape incident
- Fannie Lou Hamer
- Joan Little
- List of kidnappings (1950–1959)
- Recy Taylor
- Rape in the United States
- Viola Liuzzo
