= Frederick G. Bromberg =

American politician (1837–1930)

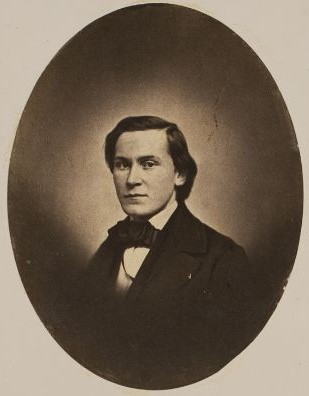

Member of the U.S. House of Representatives from Alabama's 1st district
- In office March 4, 1873 – March 3, 1875
- Preceded by: Benjamin S. Turner
- Succeeded by: Jeremiah Haralson

Member of the Alabama Senate
- In office 1868-1872

Personal details
- Born: Frederick George Bromberg; June 19, 1837 New York City, New York
- Died: September 4, 1930 (aged 93) Mobile, Alabama
- Resting place: Magnolia Cemetery
- Party: Liberal Republican; Democratic

Frederick George Bromberg (June 19, 1837 – September 4, 1930) was an American educator, lawyer, and politician who served one term as a U.S. representative from Alabama from 1873 to 1875.

== Biography ==
Born in New York City, Bromberg moved with his parents to Mobile, Alabama, in February 1838. He attended the public schools and graduated from Harvard University in 1858. He then studied chemistry at Harvard from 1861 to 1863, and was a tutor of mathematics there from 1863 to 1865.

=== Political career ===
He was appointed treasurer of the city of Mobile in July 1867 by Maj. Gen. John Pope, who commanded the department, and served until January 19, 1869. He served as a member of the Alabama State Senate 1868–1872. He was appointed postmaster of Mobile in July 1869 but was removed in June 1871. He served as chairman of the Alabama delegation to the Liberal Republican Convention at Cincinnati in 1872 (the party's only national convention).

==== Congress ====
Bromberg was elected as a Liberal Republican and Democratic Party fusion candidate to the Forty-third Congress (March 4, 1873 – March 3, 1875), largely due to a split in the main Republican vote, defeating Philip Joseph due to the main Republican Party splitting into various factions. Bromberg received 43.59% of the vote in the election.

He unsuccessfully ran against Jeremiah Haralson in 1874. In this race, he actually got 46% of the vote, but without a three-way race, he lost. He contested the results of the election before Congress but they accepted the results as valid.

=== Later career ===
He studied law, was admitted to the bar in 1877 and commenced practice in Mobile, Alabama. He served as president of the State bar association in 1906.

Bromberg served as the Alabama commissioner of the World's Columbian Exposition at Chicago in 1893.

=== Death and burial ===
He died in Mobile, Alabama, on September 4, 1930, and was interred in Magnolia Cemetery.

== See also ==
- 1872 United States presidential election

== Notes ==
U.S. House of Representatives
| Preceded by Benjamin S. Turner | Member of the U.S. House of Representatives from Alabama's 1st congressional district 1873 – 1875 | Succeeded by Jeremiah Haralson |
