= Huntsville Gazette =

African-American Newspaper (1879-1984)

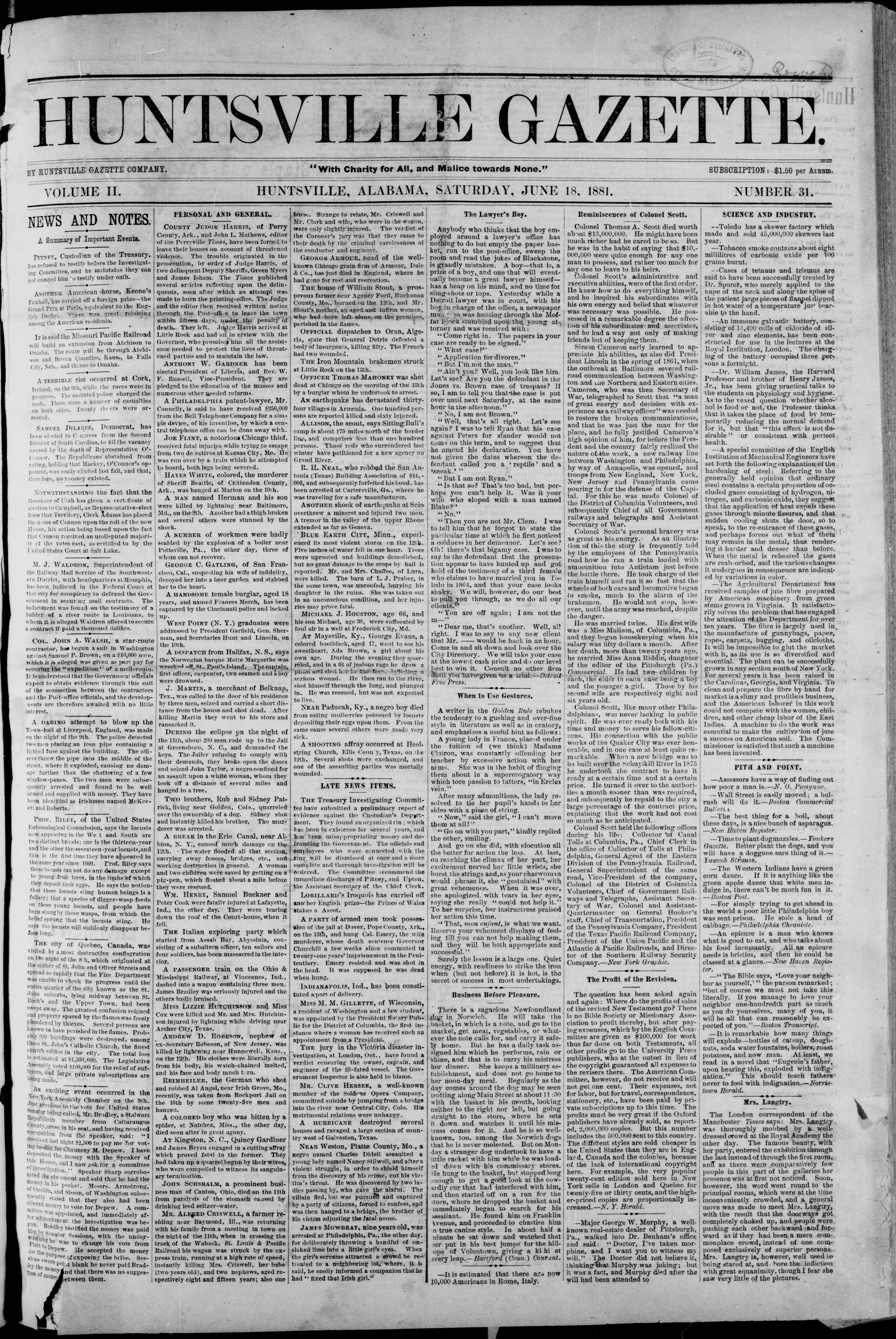
Huntsville Gazette from June 18, 1881

The Huntsville Gazette, also known as the Weekly Gazette, was a newspaper for African Americans in Huntsville, Alabama that ran from 1879 or 1881-1894. The Library of Congress has numerous editions in its collection. Charles Hendley Jr. served as its editor. He is buried at the Glenwood Cemetery in Huntsville.

The paper was Republican Party aligned at a time when Democrats dominated Alabama and Southern politics in the post-Reconstruction era period of its publication. The paper folded in December 1894.

Hendley was born in December 1855. A profile of him is included in Irvine Garland Penn's 1894 book on the African American press, although little is known of his upbringing. Henry C. Binford edited The Journal in Huntsville.

== See also ==
- List of African-American newspapers in Alabama
