= Henrietta Buckmaster =

American journalist

- Born: Henrietta Delancey Henkle; March 10, 1909; Cleveland, Ohio, U.S.
- Died: April 26, 1983 (aged 74); Chestnut Hill, Massachusetts, U.S.
- Other names: Henrietta Henkle Stephens
- Occupation: Writer
- Notable work: Let My People Go; Deep River
- Spouse: Peter John Stephens

Henrietta Delancey Henkle (March 10, 1909 – April 26, 1983), better known by her pen name Henrietta Buckmaster, was an activist, journalist, and author best known for writing historical studies and novels. She was also active in the civil rights movement.

== Biography ==
Buckmaster was born in Cleveland, Ohio in 1909 to editor Rae D. Henkle and Pearl (Wintermute) Henkle and grew up in New York City. She attended Friends Seminary and the Brearley School.

Buckmaster became a journalist and author focusing on historical books and novels, as well as being a book reviewer for some time. A major theme of her books was human freedom, and her subjects were often American slaves and women. In 1944 she was awarded a Guggenheim Fellowship, for which she received a sponsorship from W.E.B. Du Bois. Her most well known book, Let My People Go, focused on the Underground Railroad and the Abolition movement. Her writing was praised for "without departing from fact" being "as dramatic as it is informative." She combined scholarship with the "concern of the civil libertarian."

Buckmaster was also involved in the civil-rights movement, as well as fighting for the rights of American Indians and prisoners. She played a role as one of the leaders of The Committee for Equal Justice.

== Personal life ==
She was briefly married to Peter John Stephens, and wrote under the name Henrietta Henkle Stephens. She died in 1983 after a short illness at 74.

== Partial list of published works ==
- Tomorrow Is Another Day (1934)
- His End Was His Beginning (1936)
- Let My People Go (1941)
- Deep River (1944)
- Fire in the Heart (1948)
- Bread from Heaven (1952)
- And Walk in Love (1956)
- Lucy and Loki (1958)
- Flight to Freedom (1958)
- All the Living (1962)
- Walter Raleigh: Man of Two Worlds (1964)
- Paul: A Man Who Changed the World (1965)
- Freedom Bound (1965)
- The Seminole Wars (1966)
- Women Who Shaped History (1966)
- The Lion in the Stone (1968)
- The Fighting Congressmen: Thaddeus Stevens, Hiram Revels, James Rapier, Blanche K. Bruce (1971)
- The Walking Trip (1972)
- Wait Until Evening (1974)
