= The Corn Is Green =

Play by Emlyn Williams

- U.S. first edition 1941
- Original language: English
- Written by: Emlyn Williams
- Chorus: Chorus of Miners, Towns People, Children
- Characters: Morgan Evans, Miss Moffat, Old Tom, Jones, Ms. Ronberry, The Squire, Bessie Watty, Ms. Watty.
- Genre: Drama
- Setting: Glansarno, a small village in Wales, over the space of three years in the late 19th century.

Premiere
- Date: 20 September 1938
- Place: Duchess Theatre, London

The Corn Is Green is a 1938 semi-autobiographical play by Welsh dramatist and actor Emlyn Williams. The play premiered in London at the Duchess Theatre in September 1938; with Sybil Thorndike as Miss Moffat and Williams himself portraying Morgan Evans, the West End production ran in all for 600 performances. The original Broadway production starred Ethel Barrymore and premiered at the National Theatre in November 1940, running for 477 performances.

== Plot ==
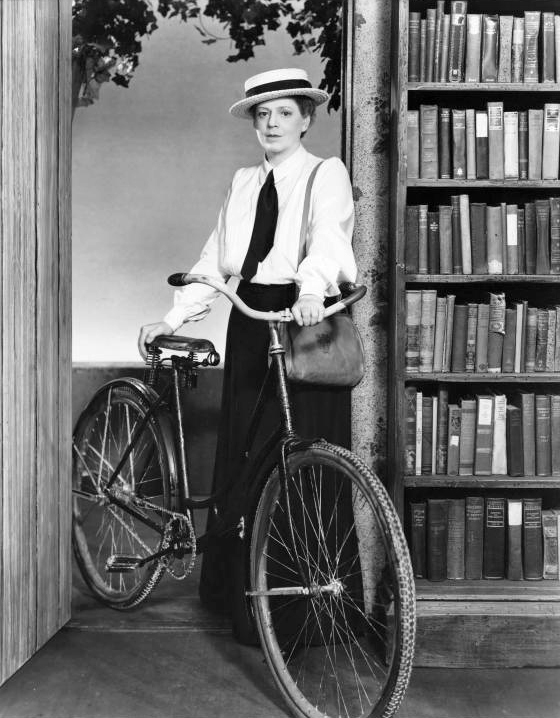
Ethel Barrymore in the original Broadway production of The Corn Is Green (1940)

L.C. Moffat is a strong-willed English school teacher working in a poverty-stricken coal mining village in late 19th century Wales. She struggles to win the local Welsh miners over to her English ways. She takes in Morgan Evans, an illiterate but promising teenager, to prepare him for higher schooling, but finds she must help him deal with the long-term consequences of an impulsive choice he had made earlier.

== Background ==
Born in 1905, Emlyn Williams grew up in the impoverished coal-mining town of Mostyn in Flintshire, Wales, and spoke only Welsh until the age of eight. He was barely literate, and later said he would probably have begun working in the mines at age 12 if he had not caught the attention of a London social worker named Sarah Grace Cooke. She established a school in Mostyn in 1915, and recognized Williams' aptitude for languages. Over the next seven years she worked with him on his English and helped him prepare to be a teacher. She obtained a scholarship for him in Switzerland, to study French, and when he was 17 she helped him win a scholarship at Christ Church, Oxford. During his studies there Williams had a nervous breakdown, but Cooke encouraged him to write as a way to recover. His first play, Full Moon, was produced while he was still at Oxford. His first success, A Murder Has Been Arranged, was staged in 1930, followed by the hit thriller, Night Must Fall (1935). The Corn Is Green is considered Williams' most enduring literary credit.

== Production ==
=== London production ===
The Corn Is Green, directed by the author, premiered on 20 September 1938 at the Duchess Theatre in London, following a five-week tour that began on 15 August. The outbreak of war forced the closure of the Duchess run on 2 September 1939, after 395 performances. The same production then toured for 11 weeks prior to returning to the West End, at the Piccadilly Theatre, on 19 December 1939 and running till 15 June 1940. The combined West End run totalled 600 performances.

==== Cast ====
- John Glyn-Jones as John Goronwy Jones
- Christine Silver as Miss Ronberry
- William John Davies as Idwal Morris
- Dorothy Langley as Sarah Pugh
- Albert Biddiscombe as Groom
- Frederick Lloyd as Squire
- Betty Jardine as Bessie Watty
- Kathleen Harrison as Mrs. Watty
- Sybil Thorndike as Miss Moffat
- Kenneth Evans as Robbart Robbatch
- Wynford Morse as Glyn Thomas
- Jack Glyn as Will Hughes
- Glan Williams as John Owen
- Emlyn Williams as Morgan Evans
- Frank Dunlop as Old Tom

=== Broadway production ===
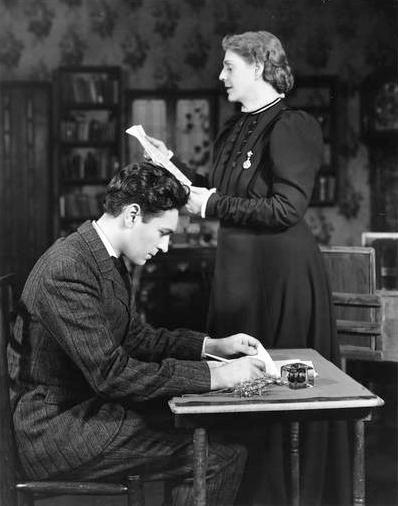
Richard Waring and Ethel Barrymore in the Broadway production of The Corn Is Green (1940)

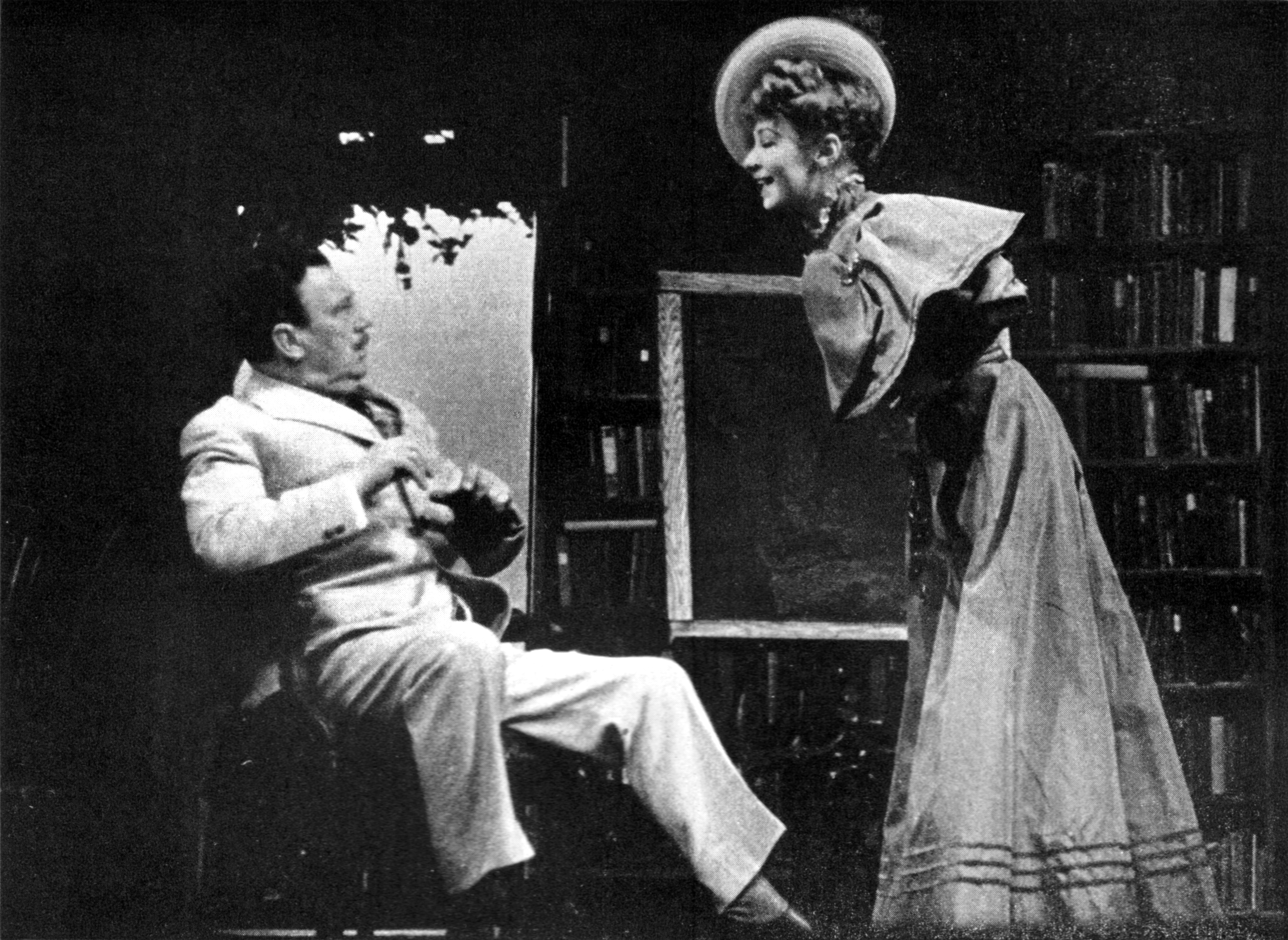
Edmund Breon and Thelma Schnee in the Broadway production of The Corn Is Green (1940)

Produced and directed by Herman Shumlin, the Broadway production of The Corn Is Green opened 26 November 1940 at the National Theatre. The setting was designed by Howard Bay; costumes were designed by Ernest Schrapps. The production transferred to the Royale Theatre on 9 September 1941, and closed 17 January 1942, after a total of 477 performances.

==== Cast ====
- Rhys Williams as John Goronwy Jones
- Mildred Dunnock Miss Ronberry
- Charles S. Pursell as Idwal Morris
- Gwyneth Hughes as Sarah Pugh
- George Bleasdale as Groom
- Edmund Breon as Squire
- Rosalind Ivan as Mrs. Watty
- Thelma Schnee as Bessie Watty
- Ethel Barrymore as Miss Moffat
- Thomas Lyons as Robbart Robbatch
- Richard Waring as Morgan Evans
- Kenneth Clarke as Glyn Thomas
- Merritt O'Duel as John Owen
- Terence Morgan as Will Hughes
- Sayre Crawley as Old Tom

Boys, girls and parents were played by Julia Knox, Amelia Romano, Betty Conibear, Rosalind Carter, Harda Normann, Joseph McInerney, Marcel Dill, Gwilym Williams and Tommy Dix.

=== Broadway production (return engagement) ===
Barrymore and Waring reprised their roles in a return engagement—again produced and directed by Herman Shumlin—that ran 3 May – 19 June 1943 at the Martin Beck Theatre.

==== Cast ====
- Ethel Barrymore as Miss Moffat
- Kenneth Clarke as Idwal Morris
- Peter Harris as John Owen
- Gwyneth Hughes as Sarah Pugh
- Bert Kalmar as Will Hughes
- Eva Leonard-Boyne as Mrs. Watty
- Esther Mitchell as Miss Ronberry
- Patrick O'Connor as Robbart Robbatch
- Gene Ross as Glyn Thomas
- Lewis L. Russell as The Squire
- Richard Waring as Morgan Evans
- Tom E. Williams as John Goronwy Jones
- J.P. Wilson as Old Tom
- Perry Wilson as Bessie Watty
- George Bleasdale A Groom

== Reception ==
The play won the New York Drama Critics' Circle Award for Best Foreign Play in 1941.

== Revivals ==
- Saturday Night Theatre, BBC Radio's long-running drama strand, broadcast a production on 27 January 1945, adapted for radio by T. Rowland Hughes.
- Olney Theater in Maryland presented The Corn Is Green in 1949, and it was in this production that Disney and Hawaii-Five-O star James MacArthur (adopted son of actor Helen Hayes) first appeared on stage. It was James' sister Mary who got young James his part, pleading with their parents for James to accompany her to Maryland for the summer.
- The New York City Theatre Company presented The Corn Is Green January 11–22, 1950, at New York City Center in a production starring Eva Le Gallienne and Richard Waring.
- In 1981, the play was produced at the Royal Exchange, Manchester directed by James Maxwell with Avril Elgar as Miss Moffatt and Alan Parnaby as Morgan Evans
- After 21 previews, a Broadway revival directed by Vivian Matalon and produced by Elizabeth Taylor and Zev Buffman opened on 22 August 1983, at the Lunt-Fontanne Theatre. Cicely Tyson portrayed Miss Moffat, with Peter Gallagher as Morgan Evans, Marge Redmond as Mrs. Watty, and Mia Dillon as Bessie Watty. The show closed on 18 September 1983, after 32 performances.
- In 1985, the play enjoyed a successful revival at the Old Vic Theatre in London, starring Deborah Kerr.
- In 2009, Boston's Huntington Theatre Company presented a revival of The Corn Is Green starring Kate Burton and her son Morgan Ritchie.
- In 2022, the National Theatre in London staged a new production starring Nicola Walker as Miss Moffat and Gareth David-Lloyd, directed by Dominic Cooke

== Adaptations ==
In 1945, a film adaptation was made with Bette Davis (herself of Welsh descent) as Moffat.

The BBC adapted the play for television in 1968 as a Play of the Month.

In 1974, Davis returned to the role in a musical stage adaptation that proved to be a disaster. The setting was changed to the American South, with the young man transformed into an African-American field worker (portrayed by Dorian Harewood). When the pre-Broadway run opened in Philadelphia, critics were unimpressed. Plans for revisions were cut short when Davis fell ill, and the show closed abruptly after eight performances. The musical later was staged for a short run in Indianapolis with Ginger Rogers as Miss Moffat.

A 1979 made-for-television movie, directed by George Cukor and starring Katharine Hepburn, was filmed on location in Wales.
