= William H. Blevins =

Alabama state legislator

William H. Blevins (1842-?) was a barber, farmer, and state legislator in Alabama.

He was born in Alabama. He was elected from Dallas County, Alabama to the Alabama House of Representatives in 1874. He and other African Americans who served in the Alabama legislature from 1870-1879 are commemorated on a historical marker.

He was a fireman with the Central City Fire Company in Selma, Alabama (Benjamin S. Turner was foreman). He was also a landowner.

== See also ==
- African American officeholders from the end of the Civil War until before 1900
