= The Committee for Equal Justice =

The Committee for Equal Justice (also known as the Committee for Equal Justice for the Rights of Mrs. Recy Taylor) was an organization founded with the goal of assisting black women reclaim their bodies against sexual violence and interracial rape. Recy Taylor and Rosa Parks founded the committee in 1944 after six white men kidnapped and raped Taylor, an African-American woman, as she left her Abbeville, Alabama, church. Taylor's case garnered heavy media coverage. With this attention came national support, which led to what the Chicago Defender called the "strongest campaign for equal justice to be seen in a decade". Committee members formed eighteen chapters across the United States, and included such figures as W. E. B. Du Bois, Mary Church Terrell, Oscar Hammerstein II, John Sengstacke and Langston Hughes, among others.

== Beginnings ==
Close to midnight on September 3, 1944, six white male assailants stopped Recy Taylor, Fannie Daniels, and West Daniels as they returned home from church in Abbeville, Alabama. The assailants claimed that they recognized Taylor, and that she was wanted for a crime. Taylor had been with the Daniels all day and thus could not have been involved in the crime as they claimed. At gun and knifepoint, they kidnapped Taylor, drove her to a secluded area and raped her. Following the assault, they left Taylor to stumble home blindfolded. Taylor's father and a deputy sheriff found her; she then described the car to the deputy. The Sheriff's Department identified Hugo Wilson as the driver and took him into custody. Wilson named the other men involved in the assault, and the department released him. Taylor and her husband filed charges, but the all-white grand jury dismissed the case on October 4, 1944.

In 1944, Rosa Parks traveled to Abbeville, Alabama after hearing about Taylor's assault. The threat of police intervention prompted Parks to meet Recy Taylor, her husband, and her daughter in a secluded cabin. After Deputy Sheriff Lewey Corbitt ended their secret meeting, Parks recorded Taylor's notes of the assault and brought them to African-American activists in Montgomery. Drawing on years of activism in which she defended the Scottsboro Boys, fought against the Ku Klux Klan, and joined the NAACP, Rosa Parks allied with the Southern Negro Youth Congress to publicize Taylor's case.

Rosa Parks gathered the support of E. D. Nixon (the Head of the Alabama Brotherhood of Sleeping Car Porters), Rufus A. Lewis (funeral home director and Alabama State football coach), and E. G. Jackson (editor of Alabama Tribune) and formed the Alabama Committee for Equal Justice for the Rights of Mrs. Recy Taylor. By 1945, the case had gained national attention, and the committee established branches established in New York, and expanded to Denver, Chicago and Detroit.

== History ==
=== Leadership ===
In her role as secretary of the Montgomery chapter of the NAACP, Rosa Parks traveled throughout Alabama collecting testimonies and documenting racially motivated crimes, such as police brutality, unsolved murders, voter intimidation, and rape. Upon coming across Taylor's story, Parks and other prominent activists, supported by national labor unions, African-American organizations and women's groups launched a defense team, initially called the Alabama Committee for Equal Justice for Mrs. Recy Taylor. Many well-known activists at the time signed on to the committee, including E.D. Nixon, E. G. Jackson, W.E.B. DuBois, Mary Church Terrell, Charlotte Hawkins Brown, Ira De A. Reid, John Sengstacke, Countee Cullen, Langston Hughes, Lillian Smith, Oscar Hammerstein II, and Henrietta Buckmaster.

=== Actions ===
The Committee for Equal Justice spearheaded the campaign for securing justice for Recy Taylor. The Committee sent delegates to Abbeville, Alabama to investigate the crime. The Committee led a publicity campaign to illuminate the prevalence of white attacks on black women. This campaign targeted Alabama Governor Chauncey Sparks, who previously supported laws that hindered Blacks’ from registering to vote. Letters and petitions poured into Sparks’ office demanding that he take action against Taylor's assailants. Newspapers across the country covered the story of Recy Taylor's assault. After a considerable amount of public pressure, Governor Sparks reluctantly agreed to launch a special grand jury investigation. The grand jury refused to indict any of the assailants.

=== Pushback/backlash ===
J.B. Matthews, a staffer for the House Un-American Activities Committee vilified The Committee for Equal Justice. Matthews claimed that communists led the committee, who were using the campaign to exploit the rape of Taylor. While some members of the committee were communists, the committee was a platform for civil rights and included many non-communists too. Additionally, some local whites claimed that Taylor was a prostitute whose true intent was to start a race war. Consequently, she received death threats and her house was firebombed.

=== Impact ===
Although there were no indictments in Recy Taylor's case, the Committee for Equal Justice's nonviolent activism created a foundation for the formal civil rights movement. Sikivu Hutchinson, author of “White Nights, Black Paradise” assessed the significance of the Committee for Equal Justice and Recy Taylor by saying, “Her case became a major catalyst for black women’s civil rights resistance and the intersectional connection between sexual violence and state violence.” Feminist scholars assert that this case illuminates the important roles African American women played during the civil rights movement, which is often eclipsed in history books by the contributions of male figures such as Rev. Dr. Martin Luther King Jr.

== Legacy ==
The Committee for Equal Justice successfully brought national attention to sexual assault of black women that was widespread in the South. The Committee for Equal Justice empowered women to report acts of sexual violence directly to the NAACP, in addition to writing letters to the Justice Department.

Leaders of the Committee for Equal Justice like Rosa Parks and E. D. Nixon later went on to form the Montgomery Improvement Association. The activists who comprised the committee were responsible for the Montgomery Bus Boycotts. During the Montgomery Bus Boycott, Rosa Parks described her activism in Montgomery as being inspired by her work with the Committee for Equal Justice.

In 2011, Alabama governor Robert Bentley signed a resolution passed by the Alabama state legislature apologizing to Taylor.
