= Benjamin S. Turner =

American politician (1825–1894)

Benjamin Sterling Turner
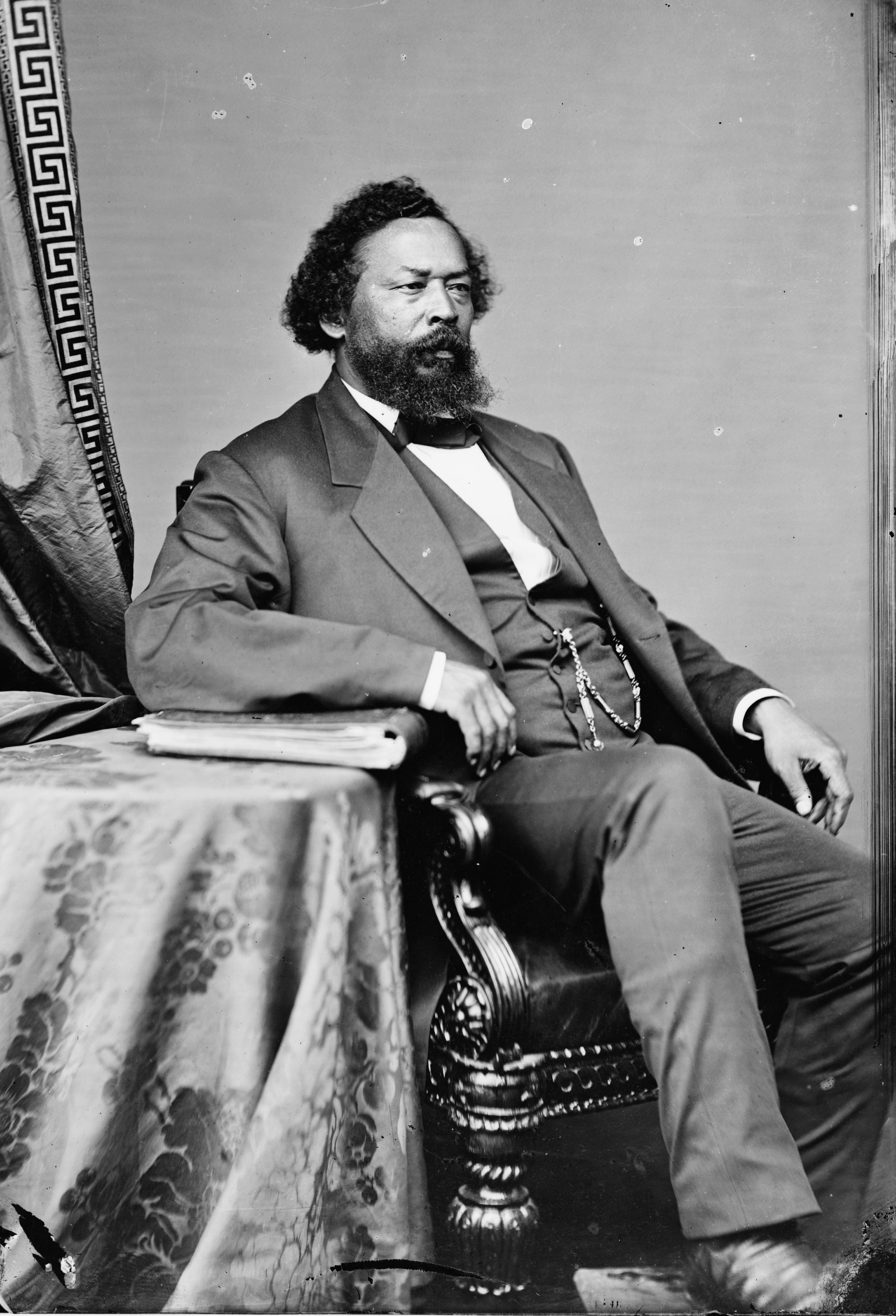

Member of the U.S. House of Representatives from Alabama's 1st district
- In office March 4, 1871 - March 3, 1873
- Preceded by: Alfred Buck
- Succeeded by: Frederick Bromberg

Personal details
- Born: March 17, 1825 Weldon, North Carolina, U.S.
- Died: March 21, 1894 (aged 69) Selma, Alabama, U.S.
- Party: Republican

Benjamin Sterling Turner (March 17, 1825 – March 21, 1894) was an American businessman and politician who served in the United States House of Representatives representing Alabama's 1st congressional district in the 42nd United States Congress. He was a Republican, but ran as an independent for re-election after losing the party's nomination. He received more votes than the Republican, but by splitting support among Republican factions they lost to the Democrat.

== Early life and slavery ==
Turner was born into slavery in Halifax County, North Carolina near the town of Weldon. His parents were slaves. He was taken by his owner, Elizabeth Turner, with his mother to Alabama at age five, as part of the forced migration of the internal slave trade. Turner obtained an education, most likely sitting in as a playmate on lessons for the family’s white children. He appears to have been enslaved until the end of the Civil War.

He was sold at age 20 to Major W. H. Gee, the husband of his owner's stepdaughter. Gee owned a hotel and a livery stable and permitted Turner to manage the businesses and keep part of the profits. Major Gee’s brother, James, inherited Turner upon his brother’s death, and Turner managed James Gee’s hotel. Turner married a beautiful Native American woman, named Independence, but a white man took her away as his wife. Turner never remarried, they had a boy together. The 1870 Census indicates he cared for a nine–year–old boy named Osceola.

== Personal life and early career ==
By the time the Civil War broke out, Turner had enough money to purchase some property. He also looked after his owner’s land and businesses when Gee left to serve in the Confederate Army.

Selma became a hub for weapons manufacturing and was overrun by the Union cavalry in the spring of 1865. The troops burned two–thirds of the city and, along with his white neighbors, Turner suffered great financial loss. He later sought $8,000 in damages from the Southern Claims Commission, but it is unclear if he received it. Turner continued to work as a merchant and a farmer after the war, replenishing much of his capital. Eager to provide freedmen with the opportunities an education had provided him, he founded a school in Selma in 1865.

== Political career ==
He joined the Republican Party after the Civil War. In 1867, he attended the Republican state convention and attracted the attention of local GOP officials. That same year he was appointed Dallas County's tax collector.

In 1869, Turner was elected a Selma councilman, but he resigned in protest after being offered compensation because he believed public officials should not be paid when economic conditions were poor.

Turner engaged in mercantile pursuits and set up a livery stable in Selma, Alabama. In the 1870 Census, he reported an estate worth $10,000 (~$224,313 in 2025). He was also elected foreman of the Central City Fire Company in Selma in 1870. William H. Blevins was first assistant foreman.

Freedmen were granted voting rights after the Civil War. Turner was unanimously nominated to be the Republican candidate from Alabama's 1st Congressional District, which at that point encompassed Southwest Alabama. He was elected as a Republican to the Forty-second Congress (March 4, 1871 - March 3, 1873). He complained that northern Republicans living in his district had not supported him enough in his run for office. In Congress he worked to restore political and legal rights to Confederates who had fought against the United States in the American Civil War. He also fought for the repeal of the tax on cotton, on the grounds that it hurt poor African Americans.

In 1872 Turner was nominated again by the Republican Party in the first district. But Turner's popularity had eroded in his Selma district. Turner’s relative conservatism, his refusal to make patronage appointments on a partisan basis, and his failure to pass economic revitalization bills roiled voters. Turner’s decline also reflected class tensions among local blacks. Prominent African–American leaders noted condescendingly that during his industrious but modest past Turner had been a “barroom owner, livery stable keeper, and a man destitute of education.” The black elite—fearing Turner would embarrass them because, they claimed, he lacked the social graces, manners, and experience of the upper class—backed Philip Joseph, a freeborn newspaper editor.

Joseph ran as an Independent, splitting the black vote. White candidate Frederick G. Bromberg, running on the Democratic and Liberal Republican ticket, benefited from the split African–American vote, winning the general election with a 44 percent plurality. Turner took 37 percent, and Joseph garnered 19 percent.

After his congressional career, Turner curtailed his political activities, emerging in 1880 to attend the Alabama Labor Union Convention and to serve as a delegate to the Republican National Convention in Chicago. He then returned to his livery stable in Selma. Turner eventually lost his business during a national economic downturn at the end of the 1870s. Resorting to making his living as a farmer, Benjamin Turner died at 69 nearly penniless in Selma on March 21, 1894. He was interred in Old Live Oak Cemetery.

== See also ==
- List of African-American United States representatives

U.S. House of Representatives
Preceded by Alfred Buck	Member of the U.S. House of Representatives from Alabama's 1st congressional district 1871 – 1873	Succeeded by Frederick Bromberg
