= Mr. Skeffington =

1944 film by Vincent Sherman

- Original poster
- Directed by: Vincent Sherman
- Written by: Julius J. Epstein; Philip G. Epstein
- Based on: Mr. Skeffington; 1940 novel by ”Elizabeth”
- Produced by: Julius J. Epstein; Philip G. Epstein; Jack L. Warner
- Starring: Bette Davis; Claude Rains
- Cinematography: Ernest Haller
- Edited by: Ralph Dawson
- Music by: Franz Waxman; Paul Dessau
- Distributed by: Warner Bros. Pictures
- Release date: May 25, 1944
- Running time: 145 min.
- Country: United States
- Language: English
- Budget: $1,521,000
- Box office: $3,871,000 ($70.8 million in 2025 dollars)

Mr. Skeffington is a 1944 American drama film directed by Vincent Sherman, based on the 1940 novel of the same name by Elizabeth von Arnim.

The film stars Bette Davis as a beautiful but self-centered woman who has many suitors but marries Job Skeffington, played by Claude Rains, solely to save her brother from going to prison. It also makes a point about Skeffington's status as a Jew in 1914 high society and later in relation to Nazi Germany. Supporting actors include Walter Abel, George Coulouris and Richard Waring.

== Plot ==
In 1914, spoiled Fanny Trellis is a renowned beauty with many suitors. She loves her brother Trippy and would do anything to help him. Fanny learns that Trippy has embezzled money from his employer Job Skeffington. To save her brother from prosecution, Fanny pursues and marries the lovestruck Skeffington. Disgusted by the arrangement, in part because of his prejudice against Skeffington being Jewish, Trippy leaves home to fight in the Lafayette Escadrille in World War I.

Job loves Fanny, but she is merely fond of him and largely ignores him. She becomes pregnant with his child, but when Trippy dies in France, she states she is "stuck" with Job, and the marriage then becomes wholly loveless, continuing only for the child's sake. Job and George Trellis, Fanny's cousin, also enlist but are stationed near home.

Fanny enjoys playing the wealthy socialite, stringing along a persistent quartet of suitors who are unfazed by her marriage, as well as much younger lovers. Lonely, Job finds solace with his secretaries. When Fanny finds out, she divorces him, conveniently ignoring her own behavior.

Fanny neglects her young daughter (also named Fanny), who understandably prefers her loving father and begs him to take her with him to Europe. Although Job fears for his child and tries unsuccessfully to explain to her the nature of prejudice she will encounter as a Jew abroad, he finally, tearfully and joyfully, says yes. Fanny is relieved to be free of the encumbrance of a child. Fanny has a series of affairs, living well on the extremely generous settlement Job has left her – half his fortune – and hardly giving a thought to her daughter, whom she does not see for many years.

She retains her beauty as she grows older (much to the envy of her women acquaintances), but when she catches diphtheria, it ravages her appearance. In denial, she invites her old lovers (and their wives) to a party. The men are shocked (and the women relieved) by how much Fanny has changed, leaving her distraught. Her latest young suitor, Johnny Mitchell, falls in love with her daughter, who has returned from Europe because of the rise of the Nazis. They marry after only a few months and leave for Seattle. Fanny's daughter explains that, while she wishes her mother well, she feels no real love for her, and pities her for discarding the one man who truly loves her. Shortly before her daughter's departure, Fanny suffers the ultimate humiliation when one of her old beaux makes what she at first believes to be a sincere marriage proposal, only to withdraw it when he begins to suspect, incorrectly, that she is no longer wealthy. Fanny is left alone with her maid, Manby.

Fanny's cousin George brings Job back to Fanny's home unannounced. The Nazis have left Job penniless and worse, George tells Fanny, and he asks her to be generous. Fanny's vanity nearly prevents her from venturing down her home's grand staircase to see Job.

When she does finally enter the parlor, Job moves to her, stumbles and falls: He is blind (due to torture in a Nazi concentration camp). Fanny rushes to cradle him in her arms. As she takes his arm and guides him up the staircase, she tells the maid that "Mr. Skeffington has come home." Job had once, long ago, told Fanny that, "A woman is beautiful only when she is loved." George tells Fanny that, at that moment, she has "never been more beautiful." At long last, she realizes the truth of it.

== Cast ==
- Bette Davis as Frances Beatrice 'Fanny' Trellis Skeffington
- Claude Rains as Job Skeffington
- Walter Abel as George Trellis, Fanny's cousin
- Richard Waring as Trippy Trellis, Fanny's brother
- Marjorie Riordan as Fanny Rachel Trellis, Fanny and Job's daughter, as an adult
- Robert Shayne as MacMahon, a local gangster
- John Alexander as Jim Conderley, one of Fanny's four persistent suitors
- Jerome Cowan as Edward Morrison, one of Fanny's four persistent suitors
- Peter Whitney as Chester Forbish, one of Fanny's four persistent suitors
- Bill Kennedy as Bill Thatcher, one of Fanny's four persistent suitors
- Johnny Mitchell as Johnny Mitchell, a younger suitor of Fanny's who later marries her daughter. Born Douglas Lamy, this actor changed his name to that of his character.
- George Coulouris as Doctor Byles
- Dorothy Peterson as Manby, Fanny's housekeeper
- Sylvia Arslan as Fanny Rachel Trellis, Fanny and Job's daughter, at age 10 (uncredited)
- Creighton Hale as Casey (uncredited)
- Halliwell Hobbes as Soames (uncredited)
- Ethan Laidlaw as Cop (uncredited)
- Jack Mower as Man (uncredited)
- Will Stanton as Sid Lapham (uncredited)
- Dolores Gray as Nightclub Singer (uncredited)

== Production ==
Julius Epstein said "They had four or five scripts that had never been made, including one by Edmund Goulding and one by John Huston. We took a look at Mr. Skeffington and said, ‘First of all, it shouldn’t be English; it should be made with an American family. Secondly, the trick of the book was that its title was Mr. Skeffington, and he never appeared in the book. He should be a character in the movie.’ And it was made."

Paul Henreid says he was offered the male lead but turned it down as he felt he would not be convincing as a man who looked on passively while his wife had affairs.

According to the 1989 book Bette & Joan: The Divine Feud by Shaun Considine, Davis was going through intense personal torments at this time, which was reflected in her treatment of co-stars on this film, and several others at the time, culminating in a vicious personal attack. Apparently, while Davis was away from her dressing room, the eyewash she always used after filming the day's scenes had been poisoned, causing Davis to scream out in pain. Director Vincent Sherman, with whom Davis had once been romantically involved, admitted to the detectives investigating the incident, "If you asked everyone on the set who would have committed such a thing, everyone would raise their hand!" Even Bette Davis is quoted as saying "Only a mother could have loved me at this point in my life."

== Box office ==
According to the Warner Bros. records, the film earned $2,456,000 in the U.S. and $1,365,000 in other markets.

== Reception ==
In The Nation in 1944, film critic and author James Agee wrote, " ... essentially Mr. Skeffington is just a super soap opera, or an endless woman's-page meditation on What to Do When Beauty Fades." Leslie Halliwell gave it three of four stars: "Long, patchily made, but thoroughly enjoyable star melodrama." On Rotten Tomatoes, 57% of seven critics' reviews of the film are positive, with an average rating of 5.9/10.

== Awards ==
Bette Davis was nominated for the Oscar for Best Actress, and Claude Rains was nominated for Best Supporting Actor.
