= Tuskegee News =

The Tuskegee News
- Type: Weekly newspaper
- Format: Broadsheet
- Owner: Macon County Economic Development Authority
- Founder: A. F. Henderson
- Editor: Guys Rhodes
- Founded: 1865
- Headquarters: Tuskegee, Alabama, United States
- Circulation: 3,800
- Website: tuskegeemedia.com

The Tuskegee News is a weekly newspaper based in Tuskegee, Alabama with a circulation of about 3,800. The paper was established in 1865 by A. F. Henderson & Co.

== History ==
=== The early years ===
The Tuskegee News was started after the Southwestern Baptist, a Baptist paper in central and south Alabama, was ordered to be burned by men associated with Wilson's Raid. The Union Army believed that the Baptist, along with a number of other religious papers, had exerted a radicalizing influence by combining religious, millennialist language with denunciations of Northern tyranny. The owners of the Baptist, Rev. Samuel Henderson and H. E. Taliaferro, were promised their production plant would be spared if no religious paper were to be published in Tuskegee. It was with the Baptist's plant that Fuller Henderson, Samuel Henderson's son, started the Tuskegee News.

The News went through many editors in the early years, the most prominent of them being C. W. Hare. Hare was an established attorney and political figure in Macon County when he became editor of the News in 1895. In 1913, he became the president of the Screws Monument Association after publishing a suggestion that Alabama editors should honor the late William Wallace Screws, a confederate soldier, Secretary of State for Alabama, and editor for the Montgomery Advertiser.

=== 1960 to current ===
Over 100 years after its establishment, J. J. Johnson became the first black editor of the Tuskegee News.

In 2004, the original building housing the Tuskegee News burned down. In 2025, Paul and Gayle Davis sold the paper to the Macon County Economic Development Authority.

== See also ==
- Montgomery-Tuskegee Times
