= Peter John Stephens =

British writer (1912–2002)

Peter John Stephens (31 July 1912 in Chalfont St Peter, Buckinghamshire – 11 June 2002) was a writer of historical fiction books for teens and three children's books. He was also a poet, a lyricist for operas and musicals, and a playwright.

His play, A Power of Dreams, was produced off-Broadway with Anne Meara of Stiller and Meara starred.

He died of prostate cancer in Streatham, London.

== Works ==
=== Plays ===
- Hugh of the Glen and his clogs are all one The Best One-Act Plays (1951–1952)
- A Power of Dreams Off-Broadway Production

=== Children’s books ===
- The Story of Fire Fighting, Harvey House, 1966
- Lillapig, Ernest Benn Limited, 1972
- Faster Than Anything, Ernest Benn Limited, 1974

=== Teen historical fiction books ===
- The Outlaw King, Atheneum, 1964
- Perrely Plight, Atheneum, 1965
- Towappu, Atheneum, 1966
- Battle for Destiny, Atheneum, 1967
- Claim to the Wilderness, W. W. Norton & Company, 1967
- The Crime of Jairus Posey, Andre Deutsch, 1969
- The Thief-Takers, W. W. Norton & Company, 1970
- The Shadow over Welesmere Gap, Andre Deutsch, 1971
- The Rogue, George G. Harrap & Co, 1973
- A Shot from a Sling, Andre Deutsch, 1975

Opera Librettos (Composer Jan Meyerowitz)

- Simoon, 2 Aug 1949 Tanglewood/Mass (from a Strindberg play)
- Godfather Death, 1 June 1961 New York; Conducted by Peter Paul Fuchs 1962

== Family ==
His paternal great-great-grandfather, Matthew Stephens, was a successful Welsh smuggler near Aberthaw in the Vale of Glamorgan.

He was the brother of Richard Waring, the US-based actor, and son of Thomas E. Stephens, whose portrait of Dwight D. Eisenhower hangs in the Smithsonian Gallery of Presidents and Evelyn Mary Waring. Retaining his British citizenship, Peter John wrote articles for the British Information Service, Rockefeller Center, New York City.

He was briefly married to the novelist, Henrietta Buckmaster, before Marcia Nichols Holden, a foster daughter of Harry Sidney Nichols, was a poet and editor. Her son from a previous marriage was Anton Holden, Emmy winning sound editor and the author of Prince Valium, Stein and Day, 1982 and Dolly Vardon, Boustrophedon Press, 2013. They had two children Dylan Stephens and Gillian Stephens, both musicians. Divorced in 1968 and moving to England, he married Eliane Falconi, an opera singer. Her children from a previous marriage were Guy Cremnitz, Monique Cremnitz, Christiane Sasportas, Noelle Sasportas, John Sasportas, Louis Sasportas, Marie Therese Sasportas.They had one child, Dilys Stephens, an artist.
