= Thomas E. Stephens (artist) =

American painter

Thomas E. Stephens taken in 1960

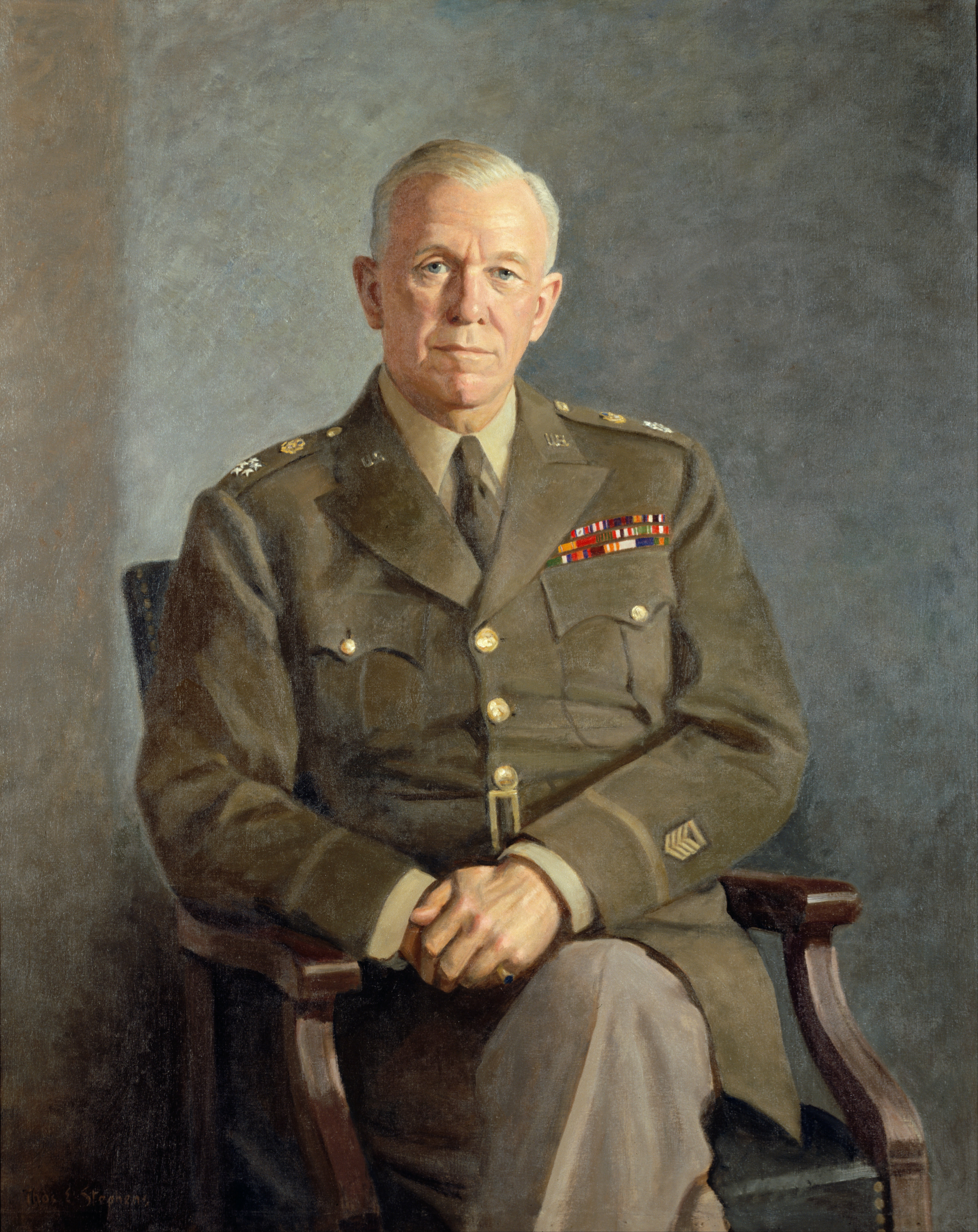
Stephens's portrait of George C. Marshall. (c. 1949)

Thomas Edgar Stephens (November 18, 1886 – January 4, 1966) was a Welsh-American artist and portrait painter.

== Biography ==
Born in Cardiff, Wales in 1886, he studied at the Art School of Cardiff University, then at the Heatherly School in London, and then at the Académie Julian in Paris. One of the first portraits Stephens painted upon his arrival in the United States in 1929 was that of Abraham Lincoln. His portrait of Eisenhower hangs in the Smithsonian Institution's Gallery of Presidents in Washington, D.C. and his portrait of Dwight and Mamie Eisenhower at Gettysburg Battlefield home. His portrait of Eisenhower appeared on the front page of Time on April 4, 1969, the issue that carries Eisenhower's obituary.

Stephens also painted portraits of George C. Marshall and Douglas MacArthur and many more of the Army's foremost generals of World War II on commission from the United States Military Academy. That of MacArthur appeared on a Life magazine cover on August 28, 1950. He also painted many judges such as Fred M. Vinson and Charles Davenport Lockwood. He painted Harry Truman and the entire Eisenhower cabinet such as George M. Humphrey, Secretary of the Treasury. He also painted the Duke of Windsor.

Winston Churchill allowed him to paint his portrait at Eisenhower's request. Stephens' works can be found, among other places, in the White House, the National Gallery of Art, the U.S. Supreme Court, the Pentagon, Walter Reed Hospital, the U.S. Military Academy at West Point, the U. S. Naval Academy, the Eisenhower Museum in Abilene, Kansas, the Legion of Honor Gallery in Paris; the American Embassy in London, IBM corporate headquarters, Cornell University, Columbia University, Harvard University, the Harry Truman Library and others.

== Family ==
Stephens and his wife, Evelyn (née Waring) had two sons, Richard Waring, an actor, and Peter John Stephens, a playwright and author.

== Death ==
Thomas Stephens died in 1966 of cancer in New York, aged 79.

== Portrait locations and ==
- George C. Marshall – National Portrait Gallery, Washington, D.C.
- Bobby Jones (golfer) – Bobby Jones Collection, United States Golf Association Museum and Library, Liberty Corner, N.J.
- two portraits of Eisenhower's mother – Eisenhower Museum in Abilene, Kansas
- Dwight and Mamie Eisenhower – Gettysburg War Museum
- ? – West Point Museum
- Dwight Eisenhower, Mamie Eisenhower and Elvira Carlson Doud (Mamie's mother) – Eisenhower National Historic Site, Gettysburg, P.A.
- Sec. George M. Humphrey – U.S. Treasury
- ? Winston Churchill painting was at Walter Reed hospital, now location unknown
- Portraits of Cora Scovil, a renowned mannequin sculptor and artist, and her husband Louis Johnston now in Excelsior Minnesota within private Berghoff Art Collection
