= Jeremiah Haralson =

American politician (1846–??)

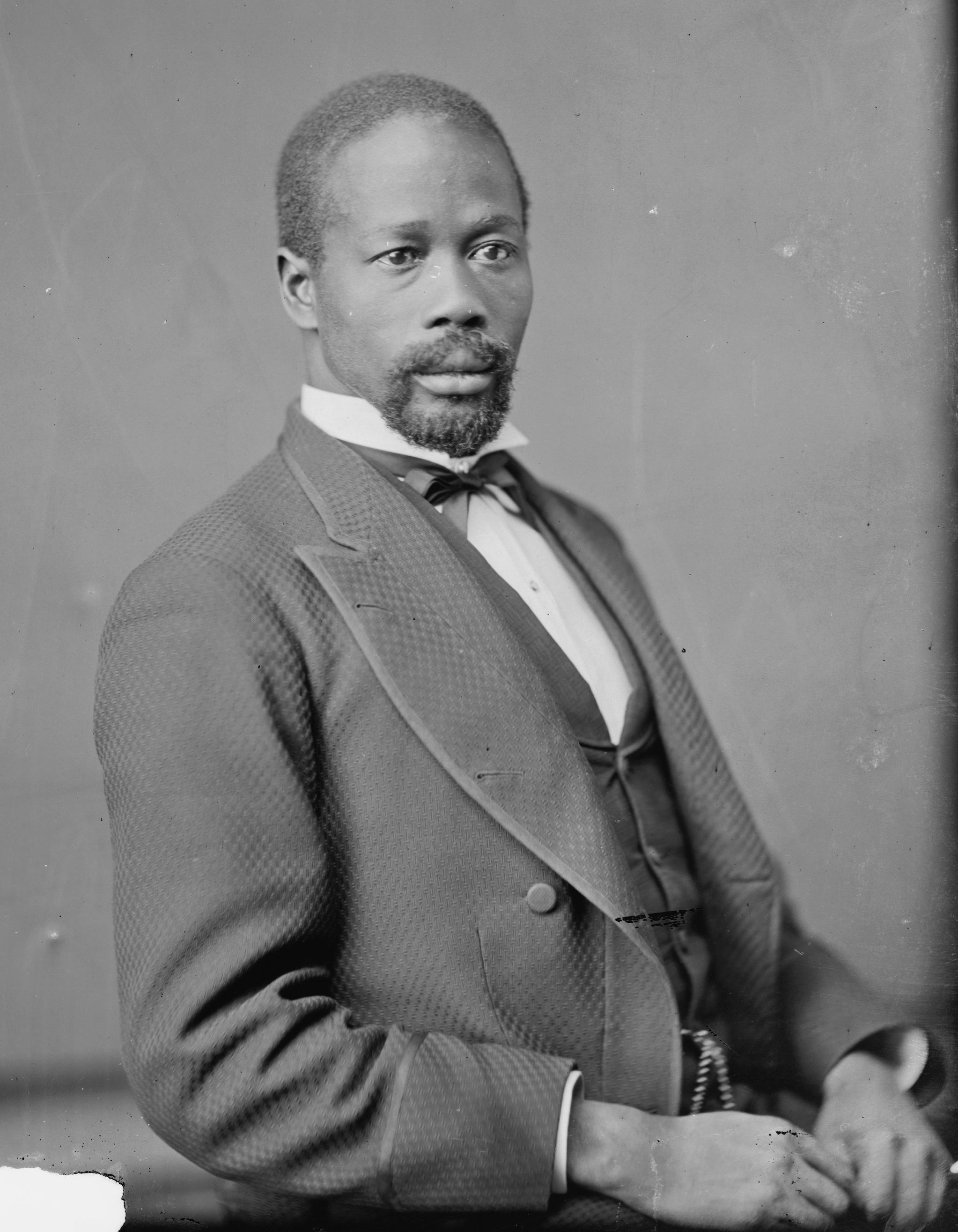
- Haralson c. 1875

Member of the U.S. House of Representatives from Alabama's 1st district
- In office March 4, 1875 – March 3, 1877
- Preceded by: Frederick Bromberg
- Succeeded by: James Jones

Member of the Alabama Senate from the 21st district
- In office 1872–1875

Member of the Alabama House of Representatives from Dallas County
- In office 1870–1872

Personal details
- Born: April 1, 1846 Georgia, United States
- Party: Republican
- Children: 1 son
- Disappeared: 25 May 1895 (aged 49); Albany, New York, United States

Jeremiah Haralson (April 1, 1846 – disappeared 25 March 1895) was a politician from Alabama who served as a state legislator and was among the first ten African-American United States congressmen. Born into slavery in Columbus, Georgia, Haralson became self-educated while enslaved in Selma, Alabama. He was a leader among freedmen after the American Civil War.

He became active in politics, being elected as a Republican to the State House and the State Senate from Dallas County, Alabama. He was elected in 1874 and served in the United States House of Representatives, representing Alabama's 1st congressional district in the 44th United States Congress.

The conservative Democrats gained control of the state legislature and gerrymandered several districts. In 1876 Haralson was forced to run from the changed Alabama's 4th congressional district, the only one still having a majority-black population. Running as an independent against the Republican candidate, James T. Rapier, Haralson essentially split the Republican vote. Dallas County Sheriff Charles M. Shelley, a Democrat, won the seat with 38% of the vote.

Although not successful in gaining elective office again, Haralson was appointed to Republican patronage positions in the Customs Service, Department of Interior, and the Pension Bureau in Washington, DC.

After 1884, he returned to the South. He was convicted of pension fraud in 1894. He appeared to vanish from the historical record upon imprisonment in New York.

== Early life and education ==
Born into slavery on the plantation of John Walker near Columbus, Georgia, Haralson was self-educated. He was sold at auction in Columbus to J.W. Thompson. (Note: According to the testimony of former slave Rias Body, the Columbus slave mart was at 1225 Broad Street.)

When Thompson died, Jeremiah was sold to Judge Jonathan Haralson who later was a president of the Southern Baptist Convention, of Selma, Alabama. This was the county seat of Dallas County, which had a majority-black population both before and after the Civil War. Jeremiah was enslaved until 1865. While a slave, he became a preacher.

== Political career ==
After emancipation, Haralson taught himself to read and write and worked for a time as a farmer. He became involved in politics. In 1868 he campaigned for Democrat Horatio Seymour to defeat Republican Ulysses S. Grant for president. Some ex-Confederates questioned his sincerity, as most freedmen were supporting the Republican Party of Abraham Lincoln, who had gained their emancipation.

Some sources say that Haralson was a candidate for U.S. Congress in 1868. But the official results do not list him as a candidate. He would have been running from the Alabama First District, which reported 100% of votes for one candidate, so they may have conducted a primary in which he was defeated.

In 1870 Haralson allied with the Republican Party, but he maintained a network with some Democratic leaders. Republicans were suspicious of Haralson because of his friendships with Democrats such as Jefferson Davis, former president of the Confederacy; Rep. Lucius Q. C. Lamar of Mississippi, and Georgia Senator John B. Gordon, who was later elected as governor of that state.

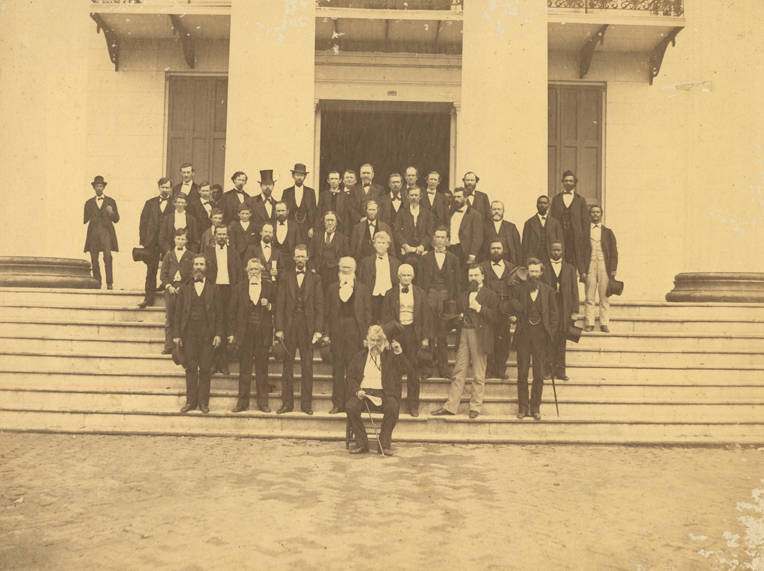
Alabama Senate members in 1872 on the state capitol steps

In 1870 Haralson was elected as a Republican and the first black member of the Alabama House of Representatives. In 1872, he was elected to the State Senate from the Twenty-First District. He helped get a civil rights bill through the Senate during his term and was considered politically powerful.

He backed Republican Ulysses S. Grant for president in 1872. His pro-Grant stance brought him into disputes with Louisiana governor P. B. S. Pinchback, who served for 30 days following the suspension of Henry Warmoth during impeachment proceedings because of the disputed gubernatorial election in that state in 1872.

In 1874, Haralson was elected as a Republican from Alabama's 1st congressional district, which then included both Selma and Mobile, to the Forty-fourth U.S. Congress (March 4, 1875 - March 3, 1877). His election was contested by Liberal Republican Frederick G. Bromberg. Haralson asked Judge Jonathan Haralson, his former master, to advocate his cause. The judge agreed and contacted his friends (former Confederates and current Democrats) serving in Congress. With the judge's advocacy, Haralson was accepted into the House of Representatives in March 1875. As a member of Congress, Haralson sought a general amnesty for former Confederates (who had been temporarily barred from office) in order to help create harmony between blacks and whites.

Haralson's oratorical abilities drew the commendation of Frederick Douglass, an established civil rights leader in the North. Douglass described Haralson as speaking “with humor enough in him to supply a half dozen circus clowns.”

In 1876 Haralson ran for reelection. Due to redistricting by the state legislature to accomplish gerrymandering, he was running for Alabama's 4th congressional district, which then had a black majority. Election campaigns in the 1870s had been violent as Democrats sought to regain political control of the state, using fraud, intimidation and physical violence to suppress the black vote, because of the black-majority or near-majority population in many counties, who were voting for Republican candidates.

Former congressman James T. Rapier, who was also African American, had bought a plantation in this district. This was the only remaining Alabama district in which the black population still comprised a majority population. Rapier won the Republican primary and thus the nomination, but Haralson ran as an independent. Their competition split the black Republican vote: Haralson received 33.93% of the vote, more than Rapier's 28%. But the Democratic candidate Charles M. Shelley, former Dallas County Sheriff, won the seat with 38% of the vote.

Haralson ran against Shelley again in 1878. He received 42.57% of the vote, or 6,545 votes, and was defeated again. This was considerably lower than the 8,675 he had received two years before, showing the effects of Democratic suppression of the black Republican vote.

In 1879, Haralson was appointed by President Rutherford B. Hayes to a Federal patronage position in the US customhouse in Baltimore, Maryland. He was later employed as a clerk at the Department of the Interior. Appointed on August 12, 1882, to the Pension Bureau in Washington, D.C.; he served until August 21, 1884.

Haralson moved to Louisiana, where he engaged in agricultural pursuits. He moved to Arkansas in 1891, where he served as pension agent. He was indicted and convicted on charges of pension fraud in 1894. Haralson vanishes from the historical record upon entering the Albany County Penitentiary in Albany, New York, on March 25, 1895 at age 49.

== Personal life ==
In 1870, Jeremiah Haralson married Ellen Norwood; they had a son, Henry, born in 1871. In 1885, Booker T. Washington proudly announced that Henry was a student at Tuskegee Institute, where Washington was president.

== Later life and death ==
Anecdotal evidence compiled in the Biographical Directory of the United States Congress reported that he moved to Texas, then Oklahoma and Colorado, worked as a coal miner and was killed by wild animals while hunting near Denver, Colorado c. 1916. However, no corroborating evidence has been found for either his Western travels or his unusual death, leaving his fate an unsolved mystery.

== See also ==
- List of African-American United States representatives
- List of people who disappeared mysteriously (pre-1910)

== Notes ==
U.S. House of Representatives
Preceded by Frederick Bromberg	Member of the U.S. House of Representatives from Alabama's 1st congressional district March 4, 1875 – March 3, 1877	Succeeded by James T. Jones
