= The Nationalist (Mobile, Alabama) =

Reconstruction era newspaper from Alabama

The Nationalist was a newspaper published in Mobile, Alabama for African Americans after the American Civil War (Reconstruction era). It was established by missionaries and allied with the Republican Party. The Library of Congress has issues in its collection. It was published from late 1865 until about 1869. It was one of the most influential "Radical" newspapers in the South.

John Silsby (its early editor), Albert Griffin, Lawrence S. Berry, and John Carraway were leaders of the paper. There were internal disputes.over distribution and marketing strategies.

== See also ==
- Advertiser and Register
- List of African-American newspapers and media outlets
