= James T. Jones =

American politician (1832–1895)

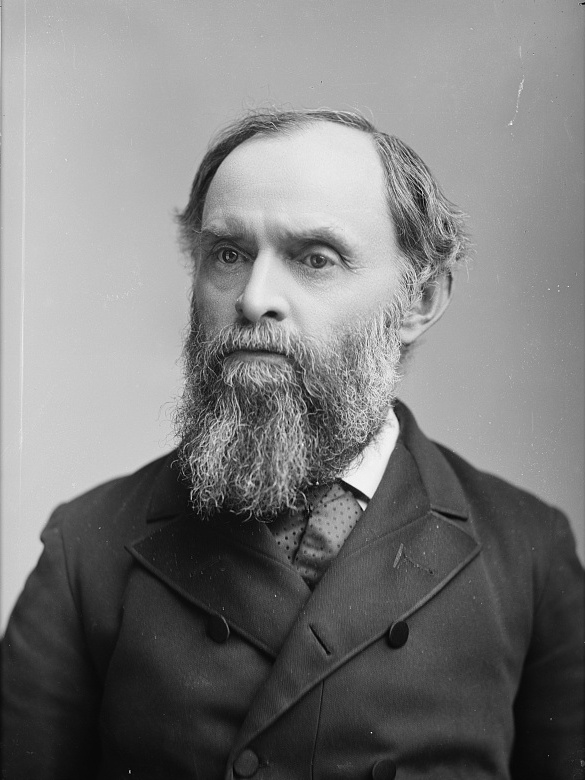

Member of the U.S. House of Representatives from Alabama's 1st district
- In office March 4, 1877 – March 3, 1879
- Preceded by: Jeremiah Haralson
- Succeeded by: Thomas H. Herndon
- In office December 3, 1883 – March 3, 1889
- Preceded by: Thomas H. Herndon
- Succeeded by: Richard H. Clarke

Chairman of the Democratic Congressional Campaign Committee
- In office 1888
- Preceded by: John E. Kenna
- Succeeded by: Roswell P. Flower

Member of the Alabama Senate
- In office 1872-1873

Personal details
- Born: James Taylor Jones; July 20, 1832 Richmond, Virginia
- Died: January 15, 1895 (aged 62) Demopolis, Alabama
- Party: Democratic

James Taylor Jones (July 20, 1832 – February 15, 1895) was a U.S. representative from Alabama.

== Biography ==
Born in Richmond, Virginia, Jones moved with his family to Marengo County, Alabama, in 1834. He pursued classical studies and graduated from Princeton College in 1852 and from the law school of the University of Virginia at Charlottesville in 1855. He was admitted to the bar in 1856 and commenced his law practice in Demopolis, Alabama. During the Civil War, Jones enlisted in the Confederate States Army as a private in the Fourth Alabama Regiment.

Jones was elected captain of Company D in this regiment in 1862. He was appointed judge advocate general in the Confederate War Department in 1864 and served until the close of the war.

He was wounded during the Seven Days Battle near Richmond, Virginia. A minie ball struck a ten dollar gold piece in his pocket. Jones nearly died after gangrene formed around the injury. The event was mentioned on page 48 in R.T.Coles’s “From Huntsville to Appomattox: History of 4th Regiment, Alabama Volunteer Infantry, C.S.A., Army of Northern Virginia”

He served as a delegate to the State constitutional convention in 1865. He ran for the State Senate in 1872, but lost in a contested election. He was an unsuccessful candidate for election in 1874 to the Forty-fourth Congress when he ran against Republican Charles Hays.

However, Jones was elected as a Democrat to the Forty-fifth Congress (March 4, 1877 – March 3, 1879). He was an unsuccessful candidate for reelection in 1878 to the Forty-sixth Congress.

Jones was elected to the Forty-eighth Congress to fill the vacancy caused by the death of Thomas H. Herndon. He was reelected to the Forty-ninth and Fiftieth Congresses and served from December 3, 1883, to March 3, 1889. He was not a candidate for renomination in 1888.

While he a candidate himself in 1888, he still played a role in the House elections. In April 1888, he was selected to head the Democratic Congressional Campaign Committee for the election cycle.

He resumed the practice of law in Demopolis, Alabama. Jones was elected Circuit judge of the first judicial circuit of Alabama from 1890 until his death in Demopolis, Alabama, January 15, 1895. He was interred in Lyon Cemetery.

U.S. House of Representatives
| Preceded by Jeremiah Haralson | Member of the U.S. House of Representatives from Alabama's 1st congressional district March 4, 1877 – March 3, 1879 | Succeeded by Thomas H. Herndon |
| Preceded by Thomas H. Herndon | Member of the U.S. House of Representatives from Alabama's 1st congressional district December 3, 1883 – March 3, 1889 | Succeeded by Richard H. Clarke |
