= Montgomery-Tuskegee Times =

Newspaper published in Alabama, US (1979–c. 2001)

- Founder: Rev. Al Dixon
- Founded: 1979
- Ceased publication: c. 2001
- Headquarters: Montgomery, Alabama, U.S.
- OCLC number: 11817447

The Montgomery-Tuskegee Times was an American weekly newspaper for the Black community, founded in 1979 and published in Montgomery, Alabama. It ceased publication around 2001. It is also known as the Montgomery Tuskegee Times, and the Montgomery-Tuskegee Times: The Alternative.

== History ==
The 1979 merger of The Montgomery Times (1977–1979) and the Tuskegee Times (1974–1976) formed the Montgomery-Tuskegee Times. Both of the precursor publications were Black newspapers founded by Joseph Ervin Morse, who had also founded The Tuskegee Progressive Times (1970–1971).

Rev. Alvin "Al" Dixon (nicknamed "Ugly Al Dixon", "Soul Mouth of the South", and "Dizzy Dixon"), founded and edited the Montgomery-Tuskegee Times paper, he also worked as a minister and disc jockey. As a DJ, Dixon booked musical acts along the Chitlin' Circuit. In the 1970s, he wrote a column on soul music, and the importance of Black broadcasters.

In 1974, Black Muslim revolutionaries took Dixon, and another WAPX employee hostage in Montgomery, after they had slashed one man and killed another. They broadcast calls for revolution. Dixon and the other worker escaped and the revolutionaries were captured.

The Montgomery-Tuskegee Times newspaper sponsored the annual Montgomery-Tuskegee Times Black History Awards starting in 1987.

== See also ==
- List of African American newspapers in Alabama
- Tuskegee News
