= Tunnel Springs, Alabama =

- Unincorporated community
- Location within Alabama Location within the United States
- Coordinates: 31°38′33″N 87°14′23″W
- Country: United States
- State: Alabama
- County: Monroe
- Elevation: 325 ft (99 m)
- Time zone: UTC-6 (Central (CST))
  - Summer (DST): UTC-5 (CDT)
- Area code: 251

Tunnel Springs is an unincorporated community in Monroe County, Alabama, United States. It has one site listed on the Alabama Register of Landmarks and Heritage, the Old Scotland Presbyterian Church.

== History ==
A post office called Tunnel Springs was established in 1902, and remained in operation until it was discontinued in 1973. An old railroad tunnel accounts for the name.

== Geography ==
Tunnel Springs is located at 31.64265°N 87.23998°W and has an elevation of 325 feet (99 m).
