= Thomas H. Herndon =

American politician (1828–1883)

Thomas Hord Herndon
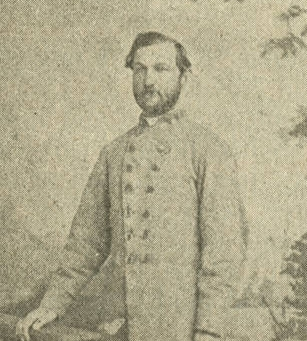

Member of the U.S. House of Representatives from Alabama's 1st district
- In office March 4, 1879 – March 28, 1883
- Preceded by: James T. Jones
- Succeeded by: James T. Jones

Personal details
- Born: July 1, 1828 Erie, Greene County (present day Hale County), Alabama, U.S.
- Died: March 28, 1883 (aged 54) Mobile, Alabama, U.S.
- Resting place: Magnolia Cemetery
- Party: Democratic
- Education: Harvard University

Thomas Hord Herndon (July 1, 1828 – March 28, 1883) was a U.S. representative from Alabama who also served as an officer in the Confederate States Army during the American Civil War.

== Biography ==
Born in Erie, Greene (now Hale) County, Alabama, the son of Thomas Hord Herndon, Sr., and Sarah Emma Toulmin Herndon. His mother was the daughter of federal Judge Harry Toulmin. Herndon attended a private school, graduated from the University of Alabama at Tuscaloosa in 1847 and attended the law school of Harvard University in 1848. He was admitted to the bar of Alabama in 1849 and commenced practice in Eutaw, Alabama. He also was the editor of the Eutaw Democrat in 1850.

Herndon moved to Mobile, Alabama in 1853 and resumed the practice of law. In 1857 and 1858 he served as member of the State house of representatives and became a trustee of the University of Alabama in 1858. He returned to Greene County in 1859 and served as member of the State secession convention in 1861. During the Civil War he volunteered for the Confederate States Army and joined the 36th Regiment Alabama Infantry as a Major. He ended the war as the regiment's Colonel and was wounded twice in battle.

After the war he moved to Mobile and once again resumed the practice of his profession. He was an unsuccessful Democratic candidate for Governor of Alabama in 1872, though he was elected as member of the State constitutional convention, which met September 6, 1875, and served as member of the State house of representatives in 1876 and 1877. Herndon was elected as a Democrat to the Forty-sixth, Forty-seventh, and Forty-eighth Congresses and served from March 4, 1879, until his death in Mobile, Alabama, March 28, 1883, before the convening of the Forty-eighth Congress.

He was interred in Magnolia Cemetery.

== See also ==
- List of members of the United States Congress who died in office (1790–1899)

U.S. House of Representatives
Preceded by James T. Jones	Member of the U.S. House of Representatives from Alabama's 1st congressional district 1879-1883	Succeeded by James T. Jones
