= Ovide Gregory =

American politician

Ovide Gregory, sometimes written as Ovid Gregory, (d. September 2, 1869) was a politician in Alabama during the Reconstruction era. A Creole, he was multilingual and freeborn. He served in the Alabama House of Representatives.

There was open racial hostility towards Gregory and the other black member of the legislator, with some questioning the legislator and constitution, with racism openly expressed on the front pages of papers.

He supported legislation to outlaw African Americans "going" with Creoles. He was a rival of John Carraway. He advocated for more schools.

He died September 2, 1869, in Pascagoula, Mississippi, after an illness that had persisted for six months.
