= Recy Taylor =

American civil rights activist (1919–2017)

- Taylor in 1944
- Born: Recy Corbitt; December 31, 1919; Abbeville, Alabama, U.S.
- Died: December 28, 2017 (aged 97); Abbeville, Alabama, U.S.
- Occupation: Sharecropper

Recy Taylor (née Corbitt; December 31, 1919 – December 28, 2017) was an African-American woman from Abbeville in Henry County, Alabama. She was born and raised in a sharecropping family in the Jim Crow era Southern United States. In the 1940s, Taylor's bravery in speaking out about her rape by a group of white men and teenage boys led to organizing in the African-American community for justice and civil rights.

On September 3, 1944, Taylor was kidnapped while leaving church and gang-raped by six white men and teenage boys. Despite the confessions of the attackers to authorities, two grand juries subsequently declined to indict the attackers. No charges were ever brought against her assailants.

In 2011, the Alabama Legislature officially apologized on behalf of the state "for its failure to prosecute her attackers." Taylor's rape, refusal to remain silent, and the subsequent court cases were among the early instances of nationwide protest and activism among the African-American community and ended up providing an organizational spark in the civil rights movement.

At the 2018 Golden Globe Awards, while accepting the Cecil B. DeMille Award, Oprah Winfrey discussed and brought awareness to Taylor's story, a few weeks after her death and in light of the MeToo movement. The Congressional Black Caucus led Democratic Caucus members in wearing red "Recy" pins while attending the 2018 State of the Union, where Taylor's granddaughter, Mary Joyce Owens, was a guest.

== Early life ==
Recy Corbitt was born on December 31, 1919, in rural Alabama, to a family of sharecropping farmworkers. At 17, her mother died and she cared for her six siblings. She continued to work in sharecropping and by 1944, she had married Willie Guy Taylor and they had a young daughter, Joyce Lee.

== Assault ==
Recy Taylor was a 24-year-old mother, and walking home from church on September 3, 1944, with her friend Fannie Daniel and Daniel's teenage son West, when a car pulled up behind them on the road. In the car were US Army Private Herbert Lovett and six other men, all armed. Herbert Lovett accused Taylor of cutting Tommy Clarson "that white boy in Clopton this evening." This accusation was false, as Taylor had been with Daniel all day. The seven men forced Taylor into the car at gunpoint and proceeded to drive her to a patch of trees on the side of the road. They forced her to remove her clothes saying "Get them rags off, or I'll kill you and leave you down here in the woods." After she was forcibly undressed, Taylor begged to return home to her family, including her husband and an infant child. The assailants ignored her requests, all removed their clothes, and watched as Lovett ordered Taylor to lie down and for her to "act just like you do with your husband or I'll cut your damn throat." She was raped by six of the men, including Lovett.

== Reactions to the assault ==
Taylor's kidnapping was reported immediately to the police by Daniel. Daniel identified the car as belonging to Hugo Wilson, who admitted to picking up Taylor and, as he put it, "carrying her to the spot" and pinned the rape on six men and teenage boys, Dillard York, Billy Howerton, Herbert Lovett, Luther Lee, Joe Culpepper, and Robert Gamble. Even though three eyewitnesses identified Wilson as the driver of the car, the police did not call in any of those Wilson named as assailants, and Wilson was fined $250 (equivalent to $4,570 in 2025). The black community of Abbeville was outraged at the actions taken by the police, and the event was reported to the National Association for the Advancement of Colored People (NAACP) chapter in Montgomery, Alabama. The NAACP sent down their best investigator and activist against sexual assaults on black women, Rosa Parks. In early October, the Chicago Defender, which had a national African-American audience, ran a front-page article titled "Victim of White Alabama Rapists", which profiled Taylor and the case.

== First grand jury ==
Parks took the case back to Montgomery where she started to form support for Taylor with the assistance of E.D. Nixon, Rufas A. Lewis, and E.G. Jackson, all influential men in the Montgomery community. Parks and her allies formed the Alabama Committee for Equal Justice for Taylor, "with support from national labor unions, African-American organizations, and women's groups." The group recruited supporters across the entire country and by the spring of 1945 they had organized what the Chicago Defender called the "strongest campaign for equal justice to be seen in a decade."

The grand jury hearing took place on October 3–4, 1944, with an all-white, all-male jury. However, none of the assailants had been arrested, which meant that the only witnesses were Taylor's black friends and family. Taylor's family could not identify the names of the assailants, and since Sheriff Gamble "never arranged a police line-up, Taylor could not identify her attackers in court". Also, the $250 bond Gamble placed Wilson and his accomplices under "were issued late in the afternoon, the day after Taylor's hearing". After five minutes of deliberation, the jury dismissed the case. The only way it could be re-opened would be through an indictment from a second grand jury.

== Violent intimidation ==
In the months following the trial, Taylor received multiple death threats, and her home was firebombed. Taylor, along with her husband and child, moved into the family home, where her father and siblings would help protect Taylor from other death threats. Her entire family was afraid to go out after dark, and Taylor would not leave even during the day. She not only feared the threats from the angry vigilantes of the town, but also the threats from her attackers the night of the assault. Her family member, Benny Corbitt, took guard in a tree every night with a gun guarding Taylor and the family until daybreak. Taylor and her family assumed they would live the rest of their lives in fear. However, talk of "the brutal rape and phony hearing" resonated through NAACP chapters throughout the south and within black communities. These organizations and others came together to defend Taylor and demand punishment for her attackers as well as Taylor's safety.

== Activism for justice ==
The activists convened at the Negro Masonic Temple in Birmingham, Alabama, where members of the Montgomery and Birmingham NAACP, editors and reporters from the Alabama Tribune and Birmingham World, and members of the Southern Negro Youth Congress, or SNYC, amongst others coordinated efforts to bring justice for Recy Taylor. SNYC members, together with Rosa Parks and other primarily female activists helped spread Recy Taylor's story all the way up the coast to Harlem, New York. Stories of Taylor's assault were printed in the Pittsburgh Courier making the "rape of Recy Taylor a southern injustice" which "immediately sparked nation-wide interest." This led to a publication in the New York Daily News titled "Alabama Authorities Ignore White Gang's Rape of Negro Mother" and attacked the long lasting segregation and defense of white womanhood as well as the "manipulation of interracial rape to justify violence against black men." After various other newspaper publications and widespread knowledge of the attack, black activists started writing to the Governor of Alabama, Chauncey Sparks. Sparks had promised during his election campaign to, "keep the federal government's nose out of Alabama business", so after numerous attacks, including comparisons of the Henry County's police to the Nazis, "Governor Sparks reluctantly agreed to launch an investigation."

Rosa Parks, in her instrumental work to bring justice for Taylor, spearheaded the creation of the "Committee for Equal Justice for Mrs. Recy Taylor" (CEJRT). It quickly gathered national support, with local chapters springing up across the United States. The group had an illustrious membership; "luminaries included W.E.B. Du Bois; Mary Church Terrell, a suffragist and founder of the National Association of Colored Women; Charlotte Hawkins Brown, a popular clubwoman and respected educator; Ira De A. Reid, a sociologist and assistant director of the newly formed Southern Regional Council; John Sengstacke, the publisher of the Chicago Defender; Countee Cullen and Langston Hughes of Harlem Renaissance fame; Lillian Smith, author of the controversial interracial love story Strange Fruit; and Broadway impresario Oscar Hammerstein II." The "illustrious" group drew the attention of the FBI, as the House Un-American Activities Committee argued that the group was simply a cover for the Communist Party.

== Investigation ==
After Governor Sparks launched an investigation, Sheriff Gamble was interviewed again about the measures he took to ensure justice on the behalf of Taylor. Gamble falsely claimed that he started an investigation of his own immediately after the attack. He also claimed that he had arrested all of those involved in the rape two days after the assault, and that he had placed Hugo Wilson, the man identified as being the owner of the car, under a $500 bond. He also accused Taylor of being "nothing but a whore around Abbeville" and that she had been "treated for some time by the Health Officer of Henry County for venereal disease." Later, other white men from Abbeville identified Taylor as an "upstanding, respectable woman who abided by the town's racial and sexual mores". Investigators interviewed the rapists, and four of the seven attackers "admitted to having intercourse with Taylor, but argued that she was essentially a prostitute and willing participant." Others, including Herbert Lovett, denied knowing anything about the attack. However, one of the assailants, Joe Culpepper, admitted that he and the other rapists were out looking for a woman the night of the attack, that Lovett got out of the car with a gun and spoke to Taylor, that Taylor was forced into the car and later forced out of the car and made to undress at gunpoint, was raped and later blindfolded and left on the side of the road. Culpepper's retelling of the story was directly in line with Taylor's original account. However, even with this information including several of the alleged assailants testimonies, the attorney general "failed to convince the jurors of Henry County that there was enough evidence to indict the seven suspects when he presented Taylor's case on February 14, 1945." The second all-white male jury refused to issue any indictments.

== Aftermath ==
The black community was shocked at the second dismissal of Taylor's case. The news coverage of the second hearing was more hostile towards Taylor based on the false claims of her being a prostitute. The assistant attorney general stated that: "This case has been presented to two grand juries in Henry County and both grand juries have not seen fit to find an indictment", claiming that "no facts or circumstances connected with this case have been suppressed." Despite the outcome, the case was considered a major victory for the formation of the civil rights movement because of the successful mobilization of activists across the nation: "The Recy Taylor case brought the building blocks of the Montgomery bus boycott together a decade [before the boycott]."

Taylor lived in Abbeville with her family for two decades after the attack. She said that during those years she lived "in fear, and many white people in the town continued to treat her badly, even after her attackers left." She eventually moved to Florida where she worked picking oranges. She later separated from her husband. Their only child died in an automobile accident in 1967. Taylor lived for many years in Winter Haven, Florida, until her family brought her back to Abbeville, due to failing health.

The publication of Danielle L. McGuire's book At the Dark End of the Street: Black Women, Rape, and Resistance—a New History of the Civil Rights Movement from Rosa Parks to the Rise of Black Power in 2011 led to formal apologies from the Alabama Legislature to Taylor on behalf of the state "for its failure to prosecute her attackers." A joint resolution was adopted by the Alabama legislature on April 21, 2011, stating:

BE IT RESOLVED BY THE LEGISLATURE OF ALABAMA, BOTH HOUSES THEREOF CONCURRING, That we acknowledge the lack of prosecution for crimes committed against Recy Taylor by the government of the State of Alabama, that we declare such failure to act was, and is, morally abhorrent and repugnant, and that we do hereby express profound regret for the role played by the government of the State of Alabama in failing to prosecute the crimes.

BE IT FURTHER RESOLVED, That we express our deepest sympathies and solemn regrets to Recy Taylor and her family and friends.

State Representative Dexter Grimsley, along with Abbeville Mayor Ryan Blalock and Henry County Probate Judge JoAnn Smith, also apologized to Taylor for her treatment. Taylor received the apologies on Mother's Day in 2011, when she visited Rock Hill Holiness Church in Abbeville, the very church where she worshipped the night of the crime. "I felt good," she said. "That was a good day to present it to me. I wasn't expecting that."

In 2011, Taylor visited the White House and attended a forum on Rosa Parks at the National Press Club. A 2017 documentary by Nancy Buirski, The Rape of Recy Taylor, premiered at the Venice Biennale and the New York Film Festival, and was screened across the U.S. in 2018. The film, which won the Venice Biennale's Human Rights Night Award, focused on Taylor and her family recounting their struggle for justice, and sought to expose a context of systemic racism that fostered the crime and coverup, and persists today.

In 2018, Oprah Winfrey, spoke of Taylor saying, "They threatened to kill her if she ever told anyone ... Recy Taylor died 10 days ago ... for too long, women have not been heard or believed if they dared speak their truth to the power of those men ... And I just hope — I just hope that Recy Taylor died knowing that her truth ... goes marching on." In discussing the historical context, Danielle McGuire noted, "Decades before the women's movement, decades before there were speak-outs or anyone saying 'me too,' Recy Taylor testified about her assault to people who could very easily have killed her — who tried to kill her." In describing Taylor later in life, McGuire said, "She was funny, witty. She was a churchgoer. She loved going to church, she loved to sing. She was very welcoming ..."

At the 2018 State of the Union, members of the Congressional Black Caucus invited Taylor's family to attend the speech and wore red "Recy" pins in honor of Taylor.

In 2019, Time created 89 new covers to celebrate women of the year starting from 1920; it chose Taylor for 1944.

== Death ==
Taylor died in her sleep at a nursing home at the age of 97 in Abbeville, Alabama, on December 28, 2017. She was buried next to her daughter's grave at New Mount Zion Freewill Baptist Church.

== See also ==
- Committee for Equal Justice for the Rights of Mrs. Recy Taylor
- Betty Jean Owens
- Racism in the United States
- Rape in the United States
- Timeline of the civil rights movement
